= Transitional armour =

14th century European armour

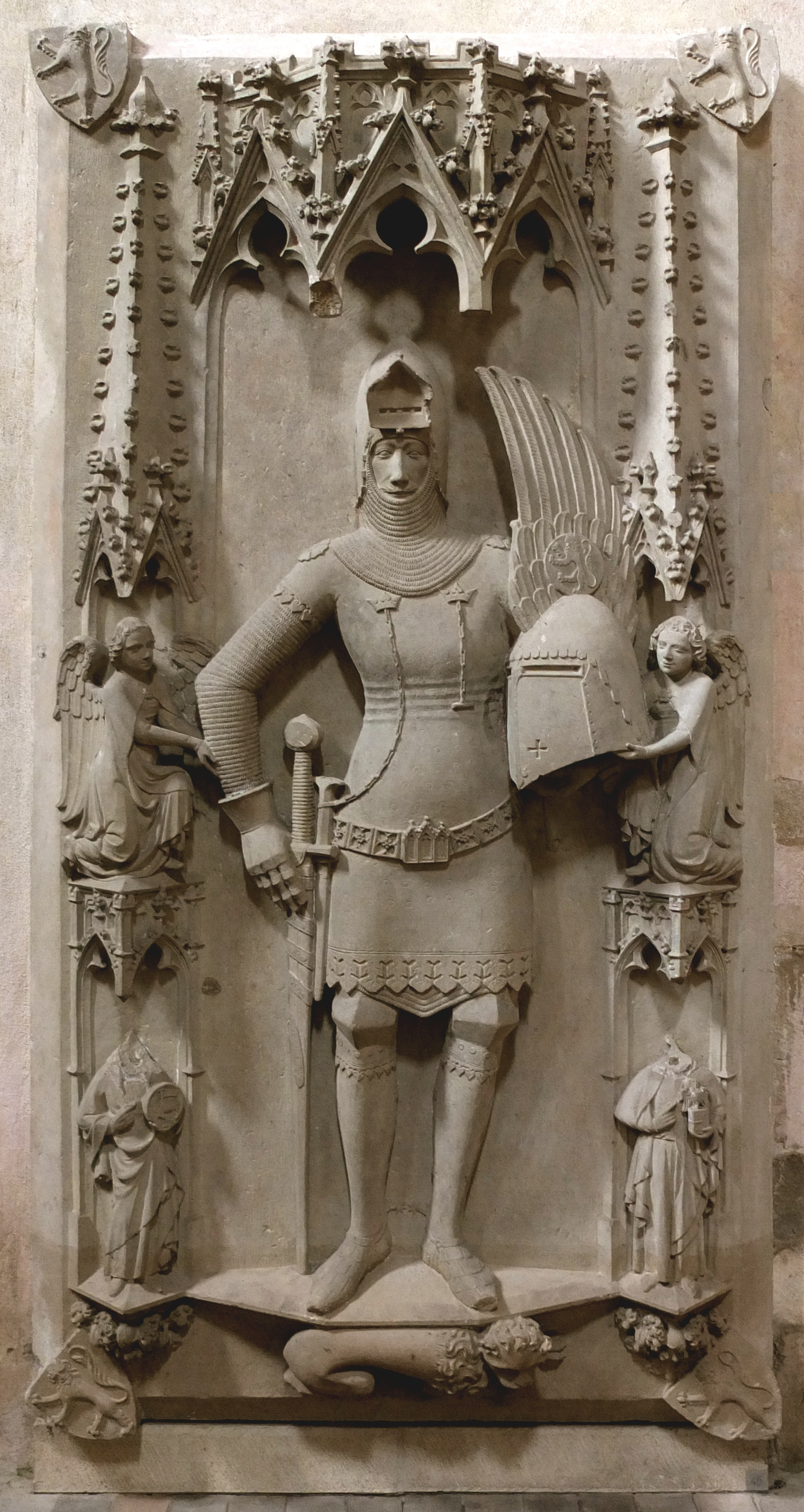
Tombstone for Graf Johann II von Katzenelnbogen († 1357), circa 1357-1370

Transitional armour describes the armour used in Europe around the 13th and 14th centuries, as body armour moved from simple mail hauberks to full plate armour.

The couter was added to the hauberk to better protect the elbows, and splinted armour provided increased protection for other areas. The coat of plates (plus variants such as the jack of plate and brigandine) emerged as a supplement or replacement for mail and is the most commonly-cited example of transitional armour. It consisted of a segmented jacket of overlapping metal plates riveted inside a cloth or leather garment, covering the entire torso; mail was often retained to protect the extremities. The number of plates varied by time, place, and individual, but there were always more than there would be in a proper suit of plate armour.

Armourers in general began experimenting with various forms of rigid defense. They worked in a variety of materials, including wrought iron, latten, leather, cloth and even bone to substitute rigid materials for mail as the knight's harness progressed. Toward the end of the century and into the following one, updates to armour took place at an accelerated rate.

The use of multiple materials is the key stylistic element of the period. For instance, a set of transitional style arm defenses could employ steel pauldrons, leather rerebraces, steel elbow cops and leather vambraces. These items would be strapped with leather and might have brass or bronze fittings and buckles. This use of varied materials gave the armour different coloring, textures and a more elegant appearance.

== Gallery ==
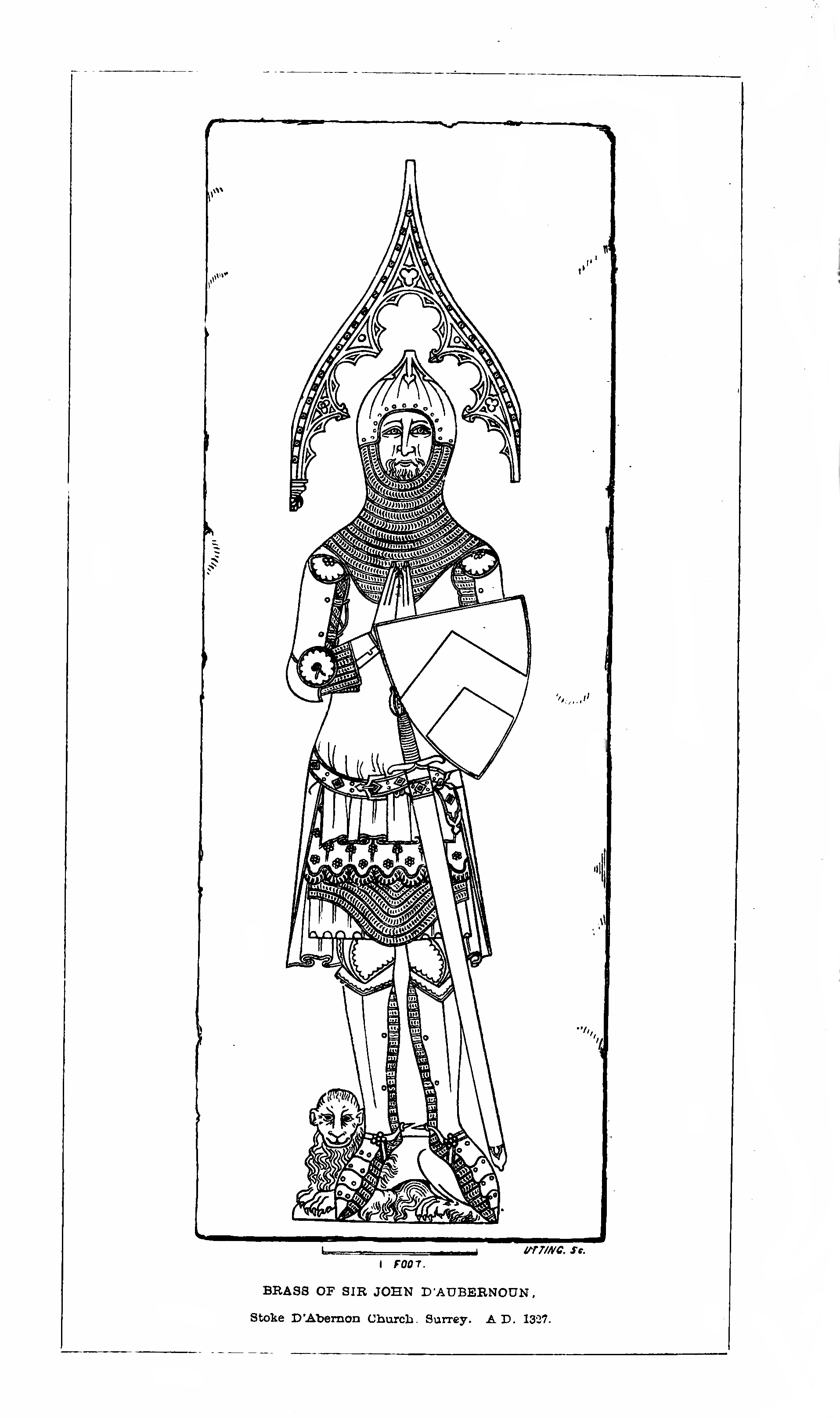
Brass of Sir John D'Aubernoun, 1327

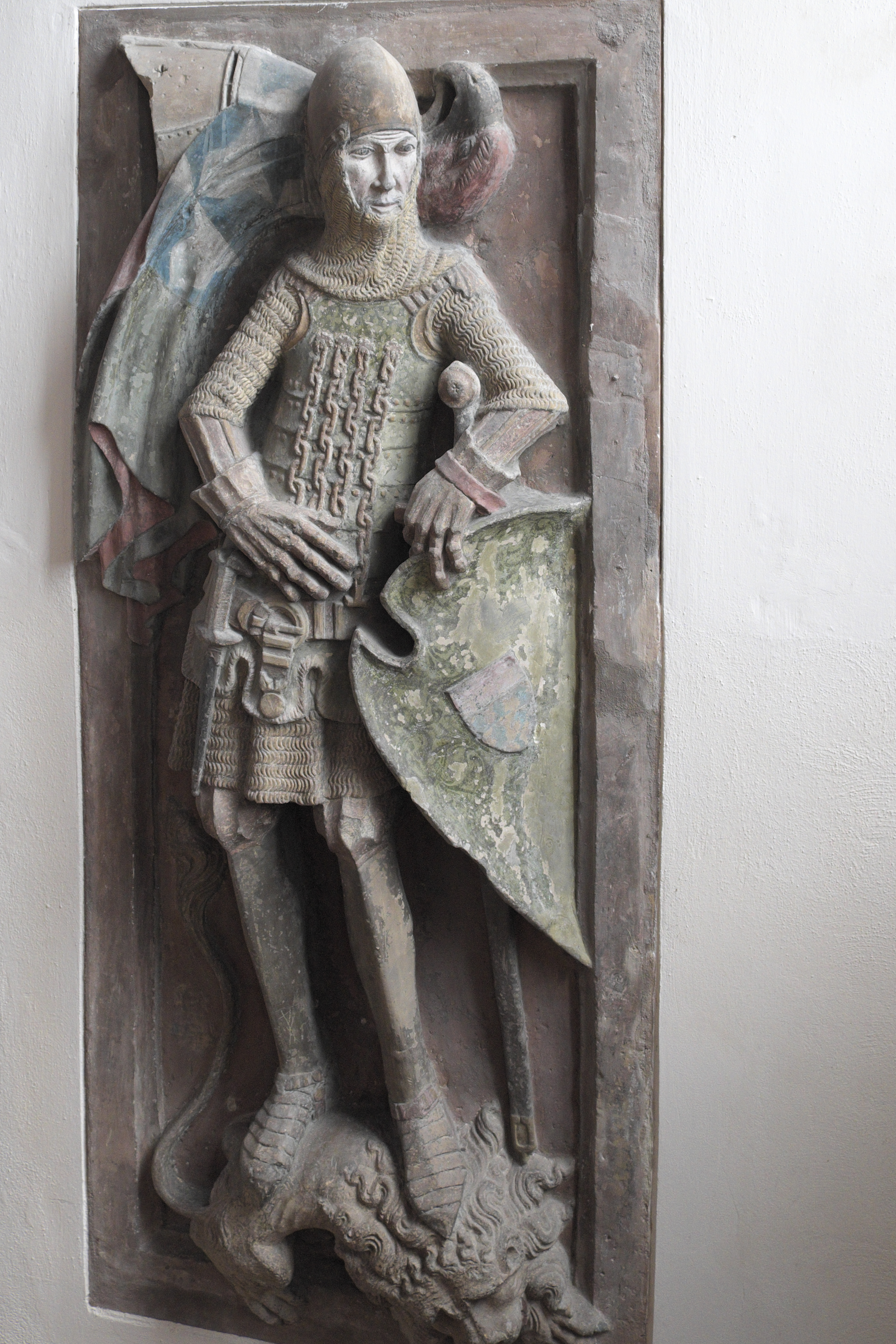
Tombstone of Walter von Bopfingen († 1336)

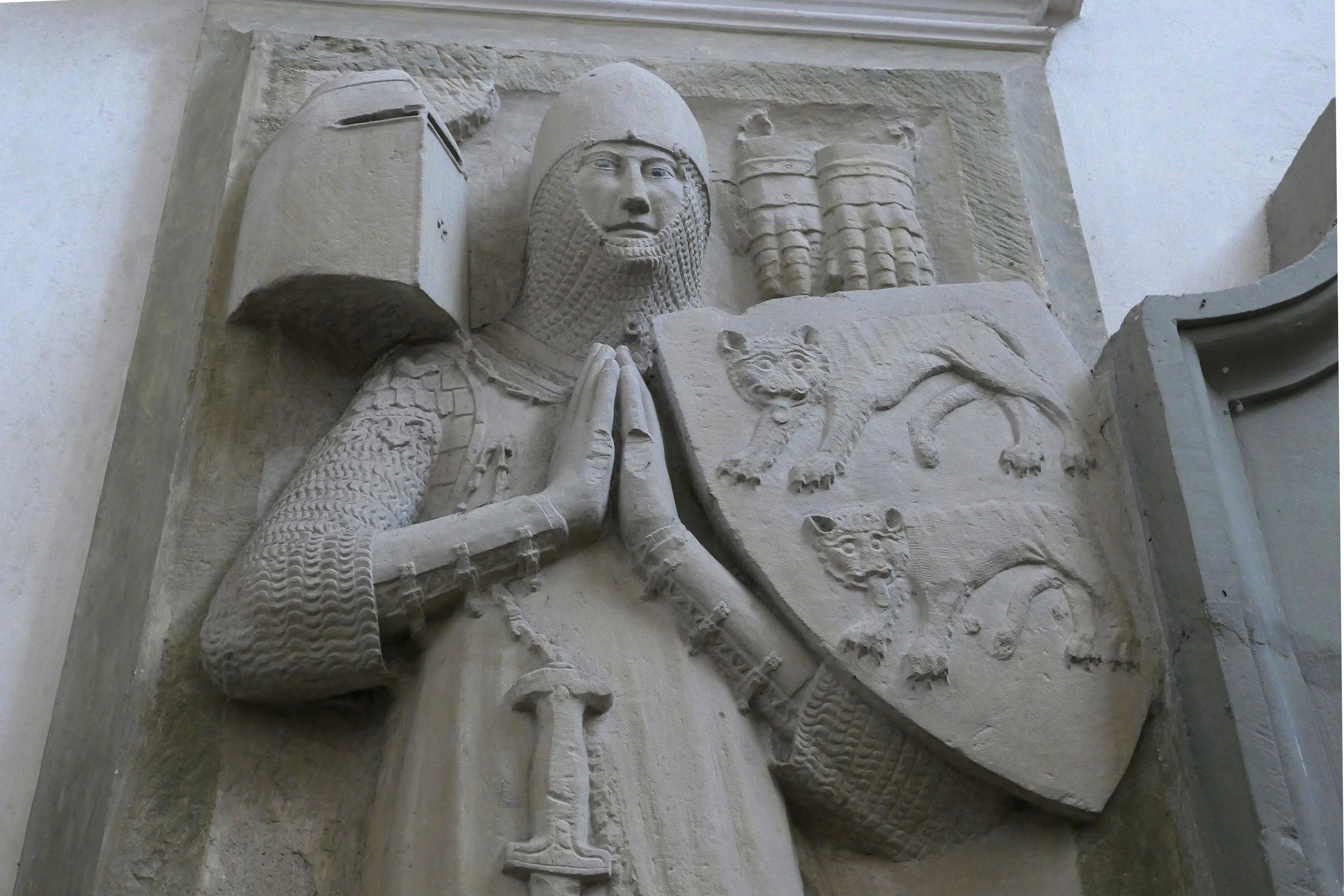
Tombstone of Albrecht von Hohenlohe-Möckmühl († 1338)

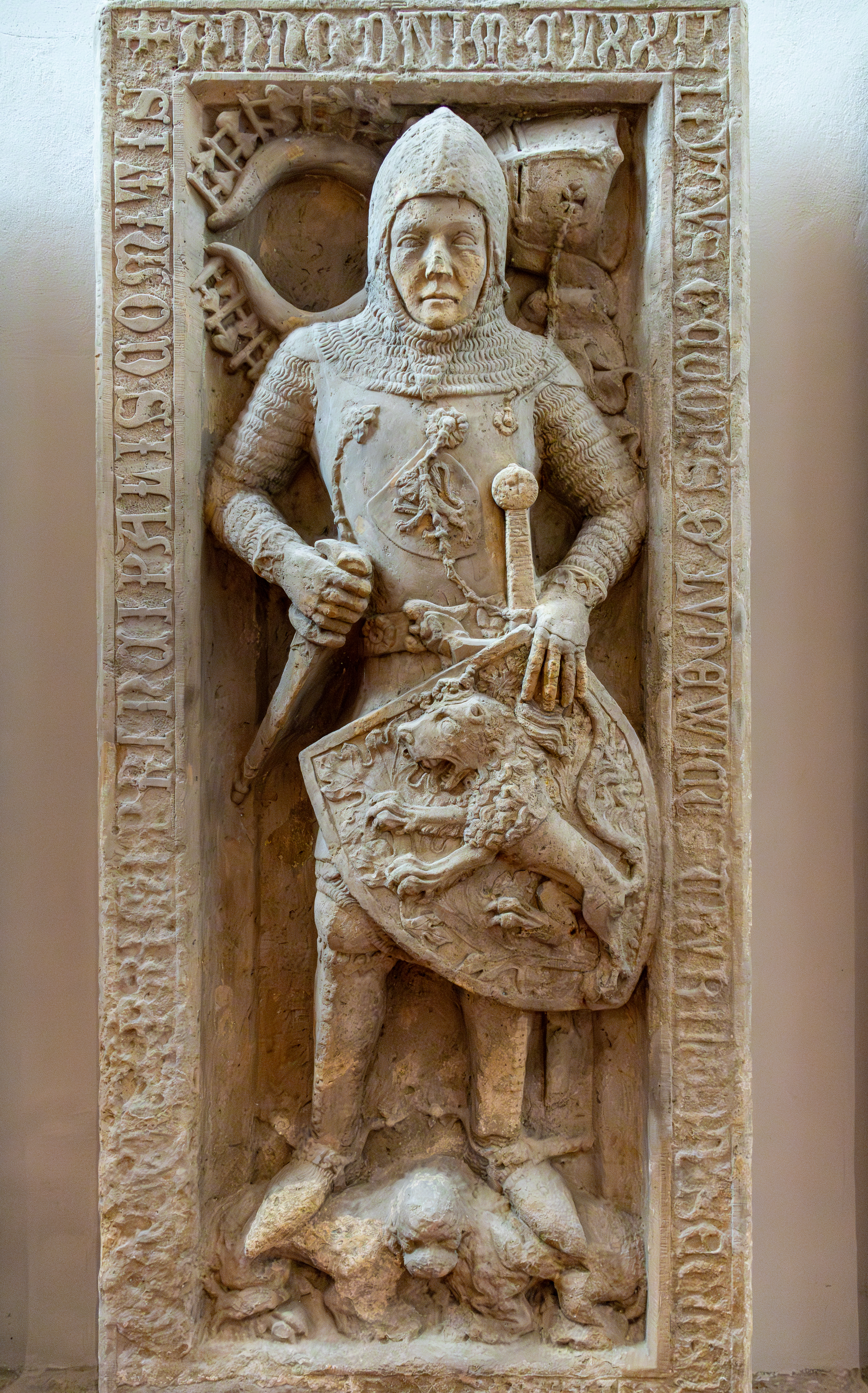
Tombstone of Ludwig II, Landgrave of Thuringia, circa 1340

Tombstone of the Knight Hans Ulrich vom Hus (died prior to 1342)

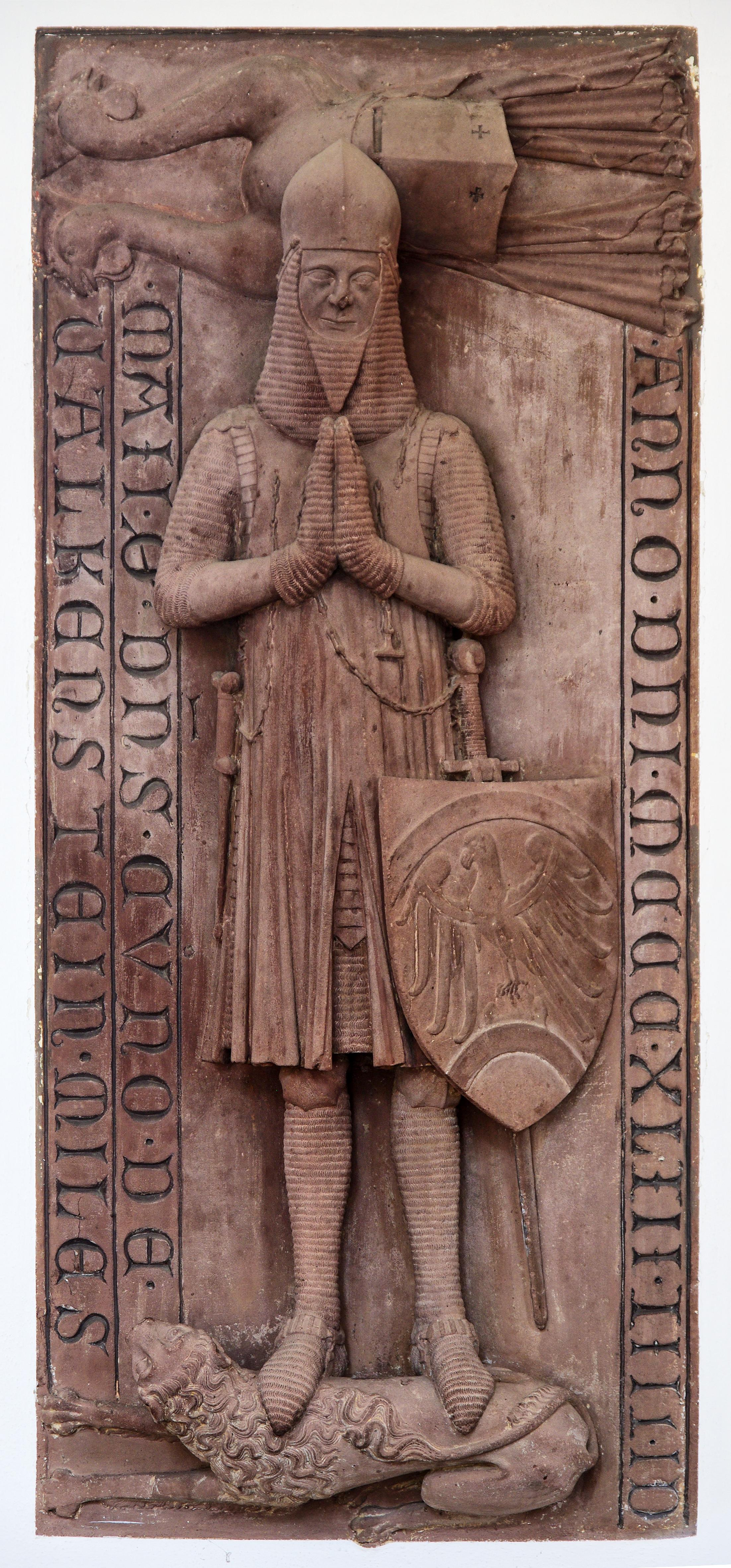
Tombstone of Kuno von Falkenstein († 1343)

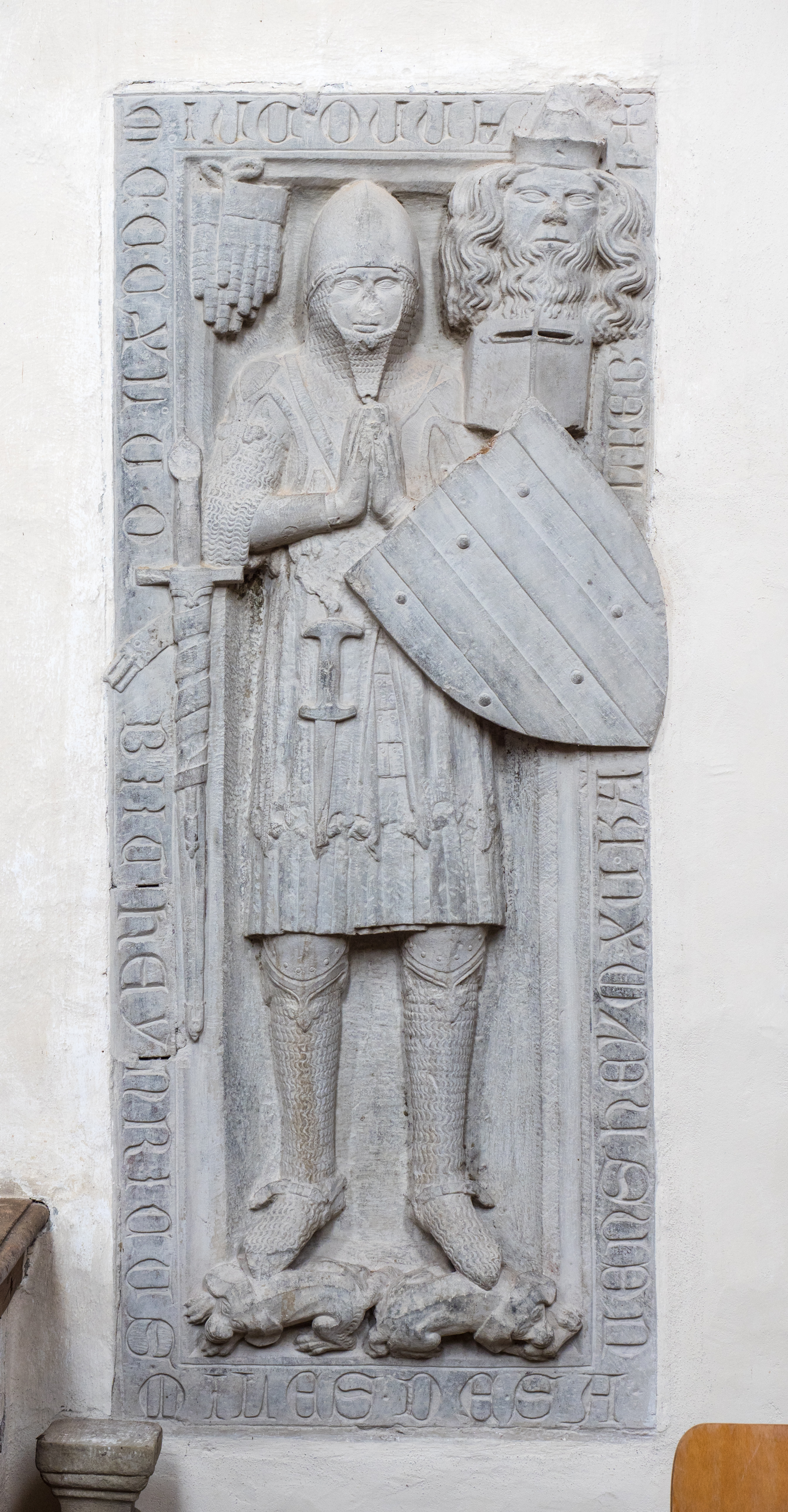
Tombstone of Heinrich von Seinsheim, († 1345)

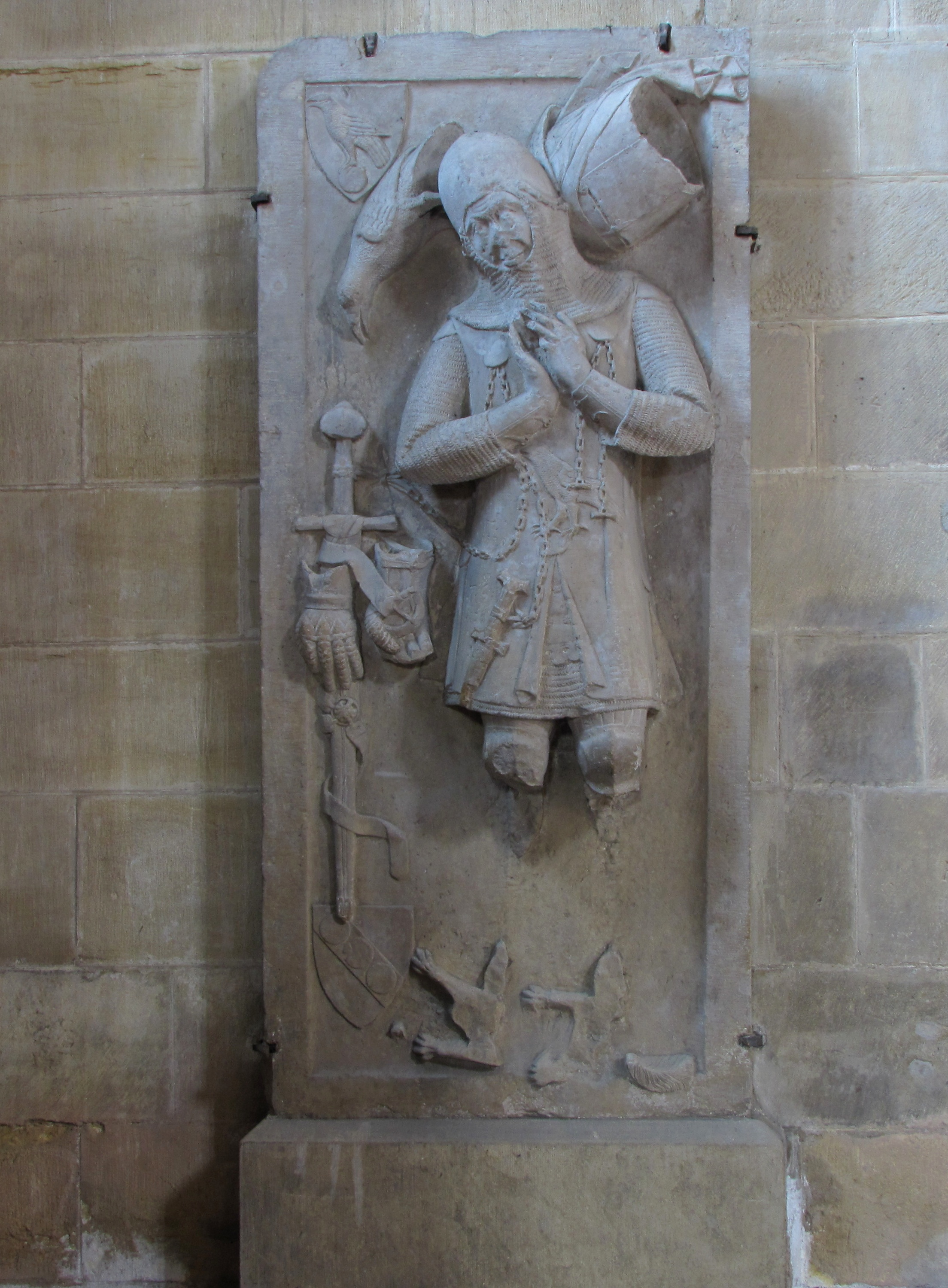
Knight, probably Werner Falcke von Munsweiler (died after 1333), circa 1345-1350

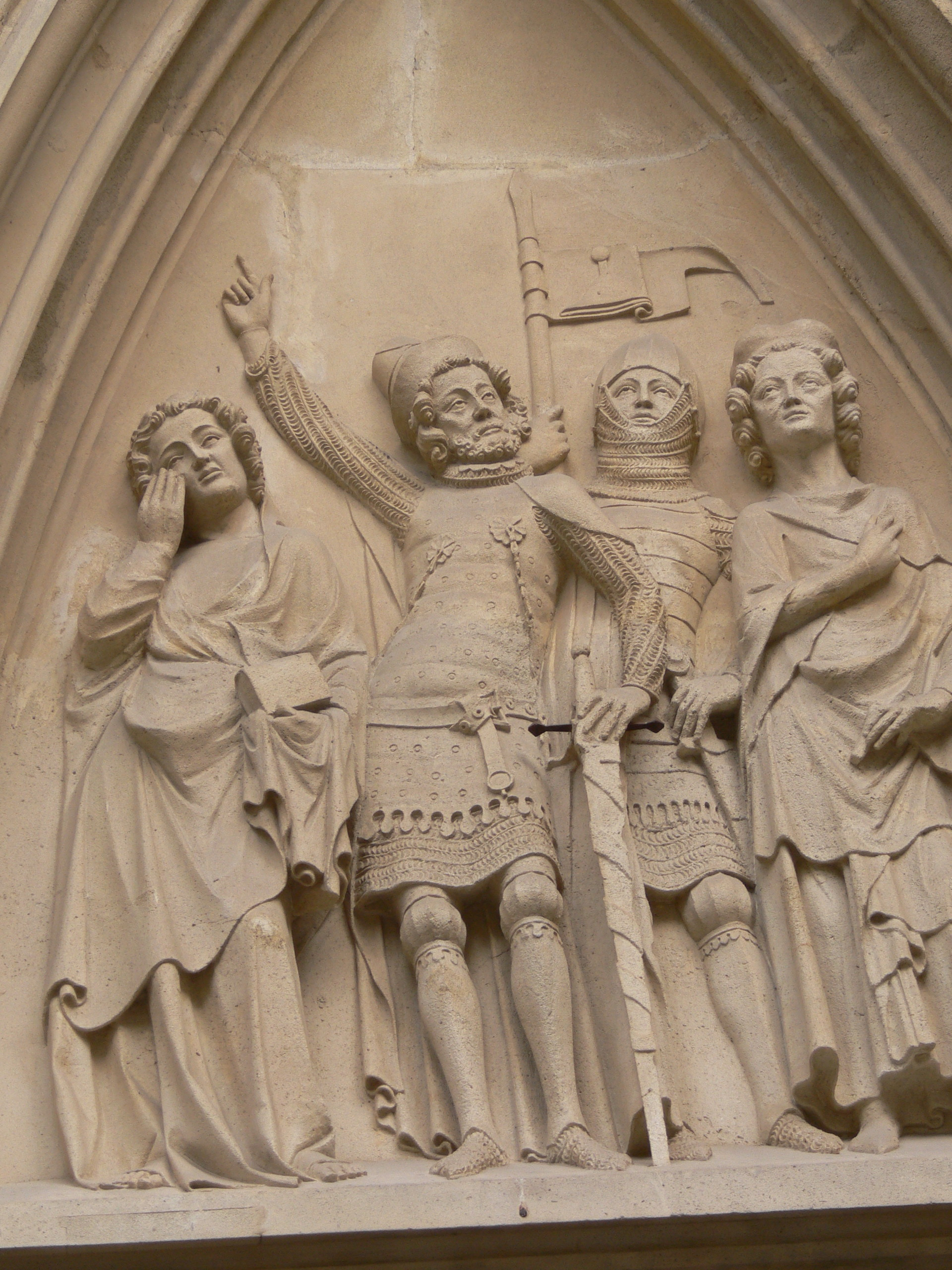
Crucifixion group, 1350

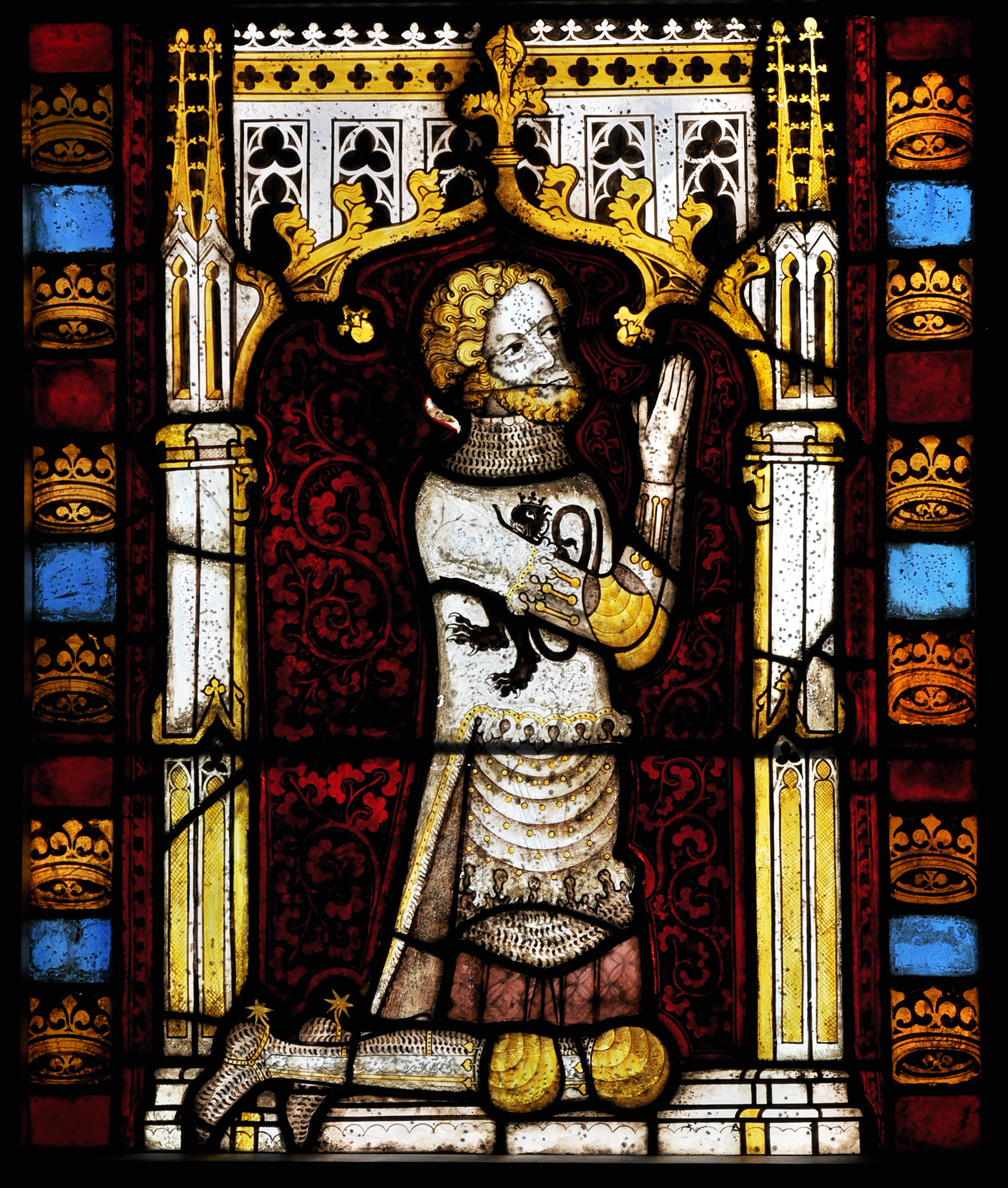
Unknown donor knigh, circa 1350

Tombstone of Pierre de Chantemelle, Lord of Flavacourt († 1352)

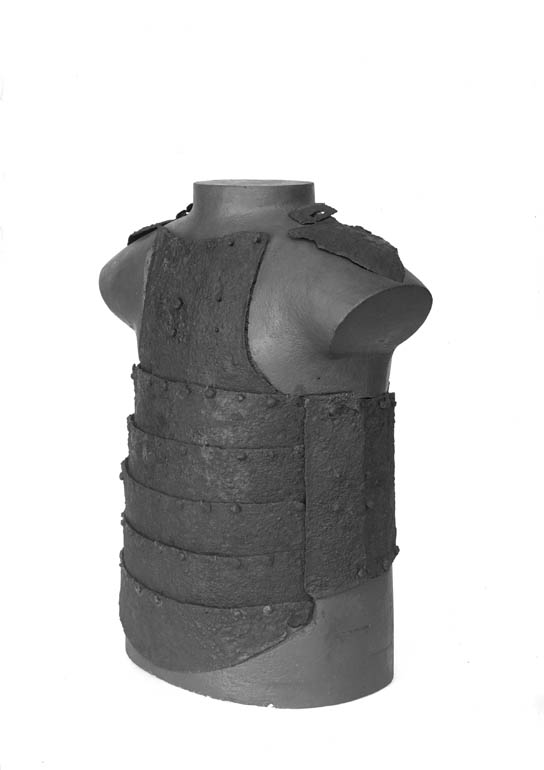
Coat of plates, before 1361

Coat of plates, before 1361

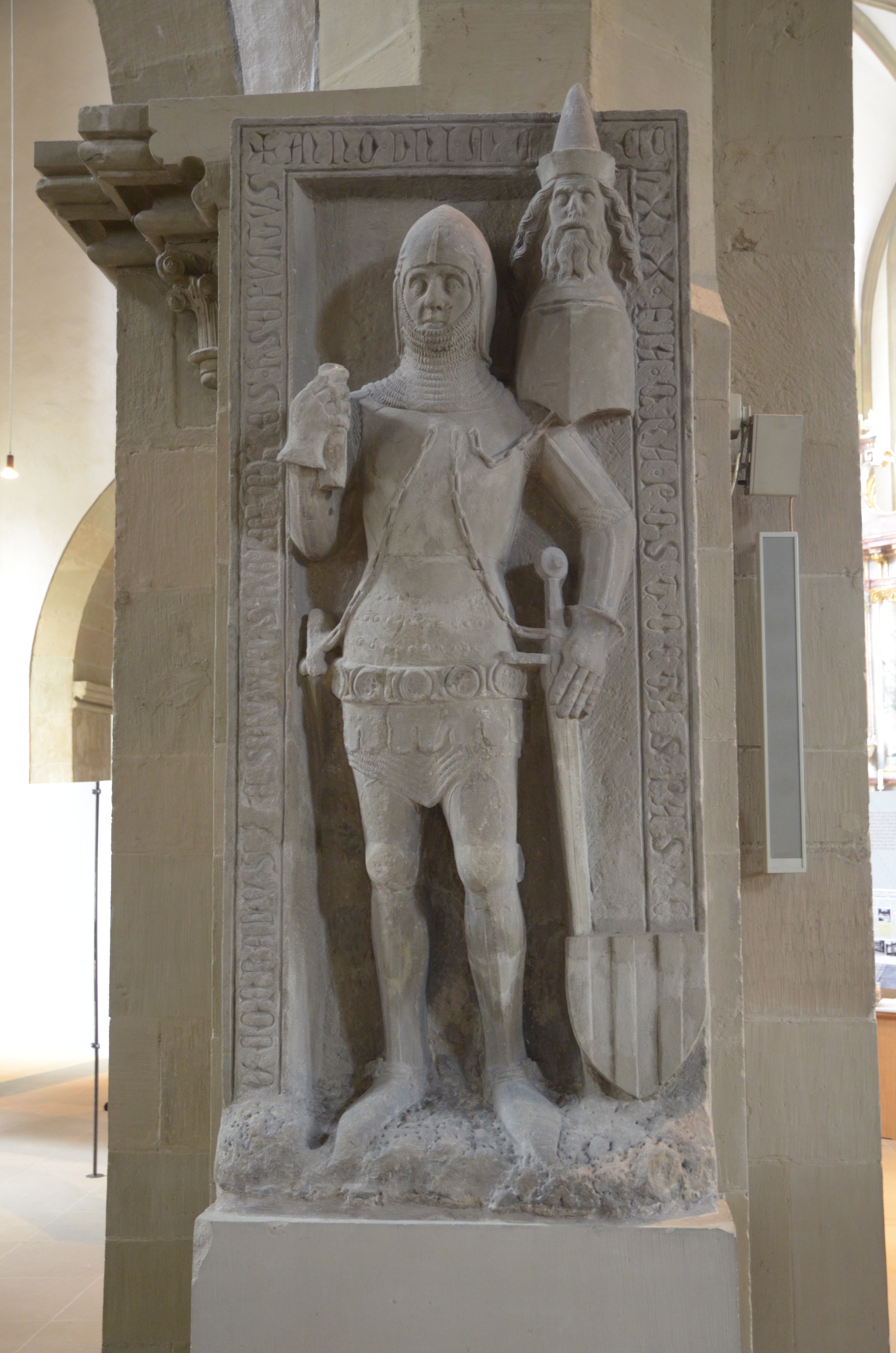
Tombstone of Konrad von Seinsheim († 1369)

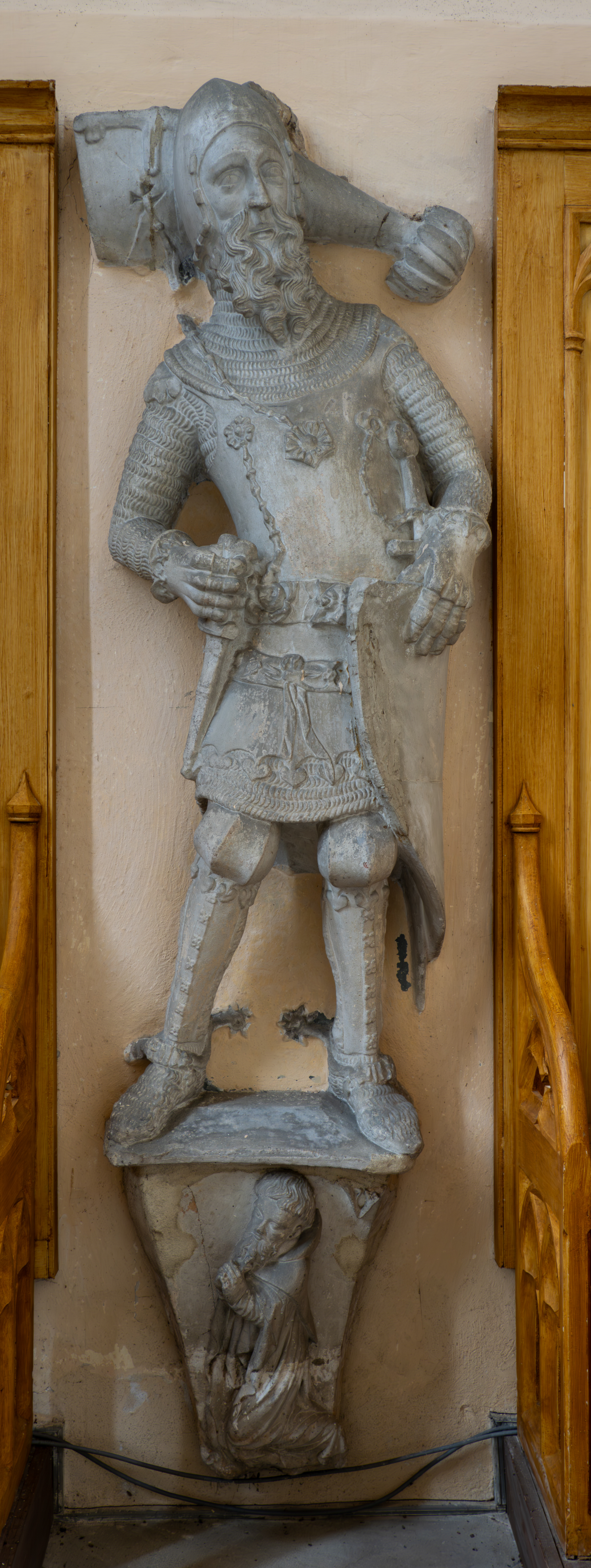
Reclining figure of Henry II of Sonneberg, circa 1370-80

Tombstone of Burkhard von Steinberg († 1376)

Tombstone of Eberhard von Wolfskeel († 1379), circa 1380

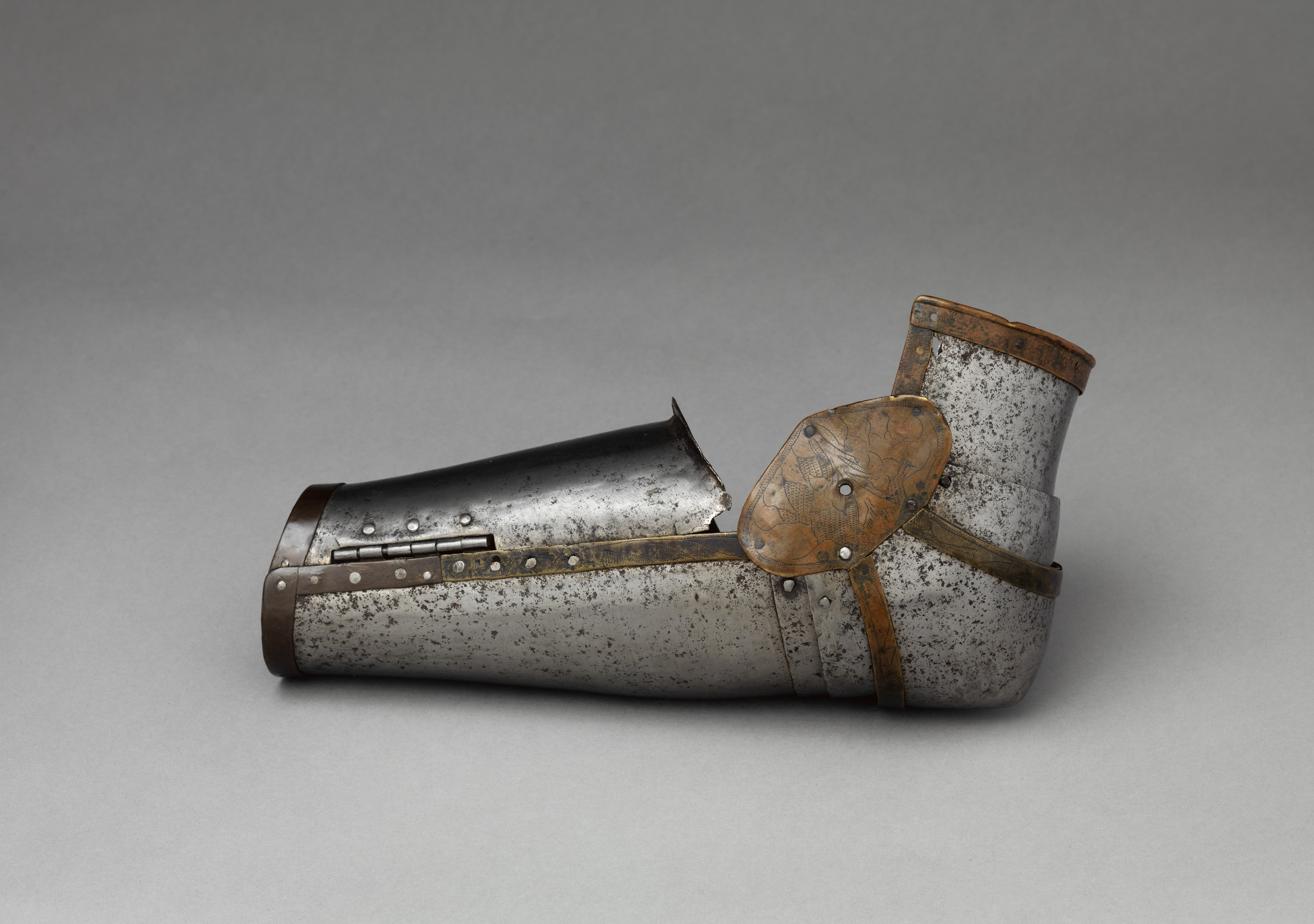
Left Arm Defense (Vambrace), circa 1380–1400
