= Faulds (armour) =

Pieces of plate armour

Faulds

Faulds are pieces of plate armour worn below a breastplate to protect the waist and hips, which began to appear in Western Europe from about 1370. They consist of overlapping horizontal lames of metal, articulated for flexibility, that form an apron-like skirt in front. When worn with a cuirass, faulds are often paired with a similar defense for the rump called a culet, so that the faulds and culet form a skirt that surrounds the hips in front and back; the culet is often made of fewer lames than the fauld, especially on armor for a horseman. The faulds can either be riveted to the lower edge of the breastplate or made as a separate piece that the breastplate snugly overlaps. Although faulds varied in length, most faulds for field use ended above the knees.

A pair of tassets to protect the upper thighs was often suspended from the bottom edge of the fauld by straps and buckles. From the 16th century onward, some armors integrated the fauld and tassets almost seamlessly; the fauld lames were those which were continuous from side to side, and the tassets began where they separated at the groin. A much larger skirt that was usually confined to foot tournaments was called a tonlet. By the 17th century, many cuirasses either omitted both faulds and tassets altogether, or had large tassets suspended directly from the lower edge of the breastplate without any fauld lames in between.

== Gallery ==
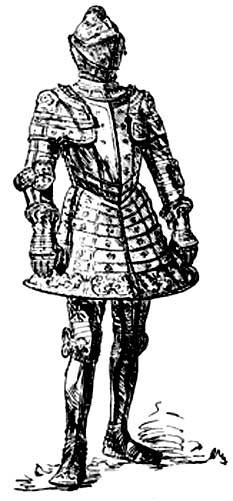
Archduke Ferdinand II wearing a tonlet, from an illustration by Wendelin Boeheim (1547).
