= Rerebrace =

Armour piece protecting the upper arm

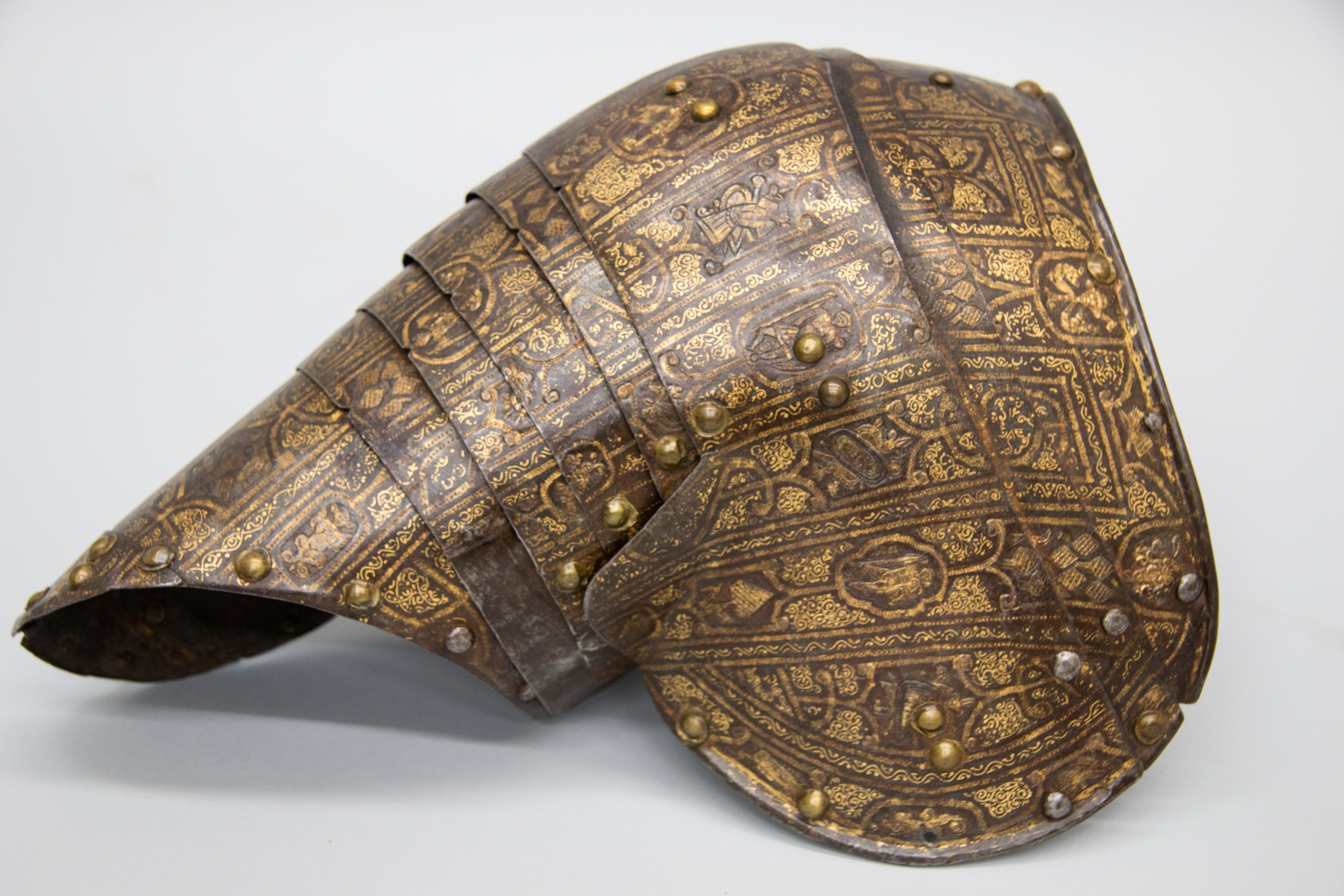
A rerebrace connected to a pauldron (which would cover the shoulder)

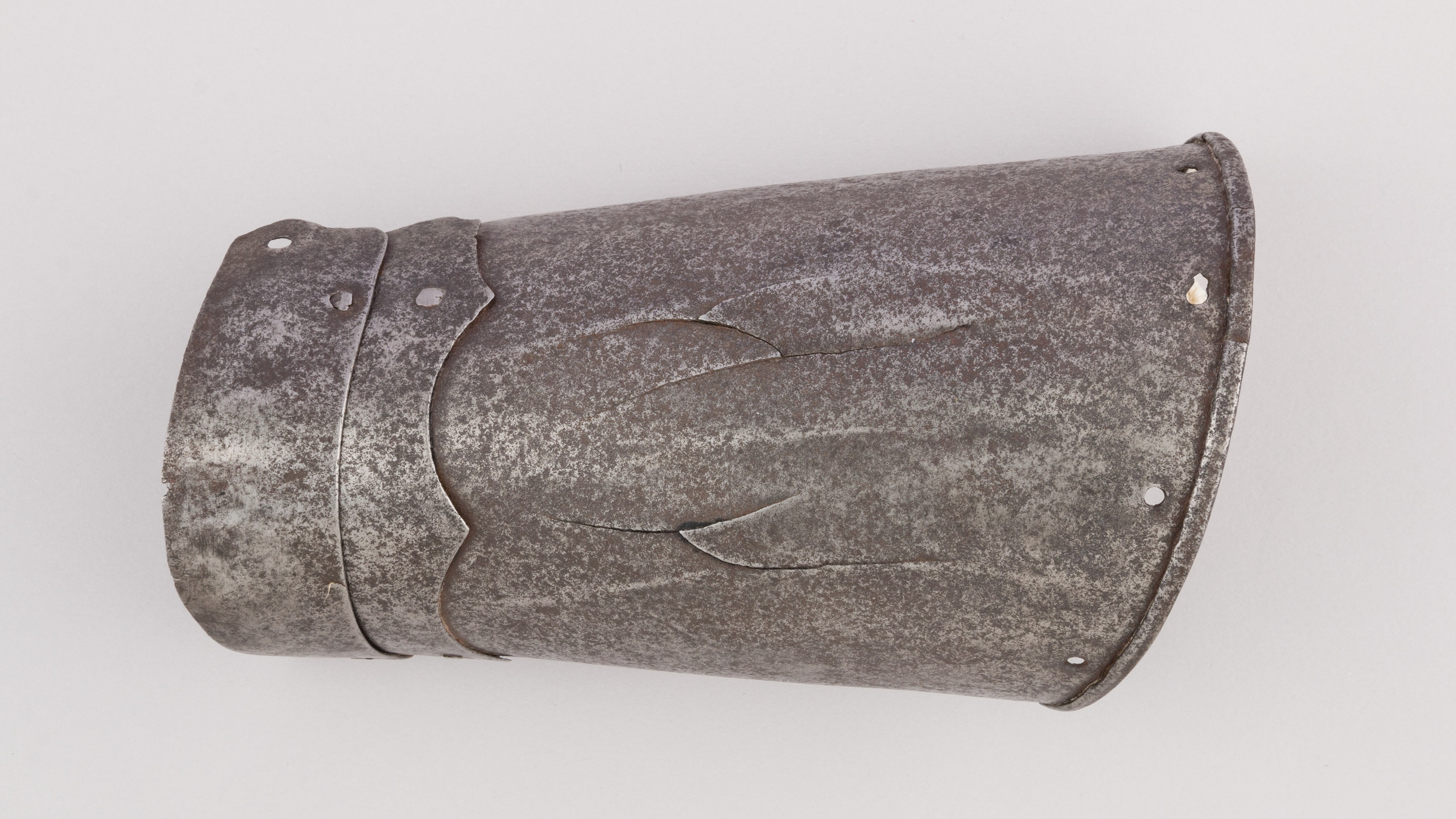
Italian rerebrace, ~1440

A rerebrace (/ˈrɪərbreɪs/), sometimes called an upper cannon, is a piece of armour designed to protect the upper arms (above the elbow). Splint rerebraces were a feature of Byzantine armour in the early medieval period. The rerebrace seems to have re-emerged in England, in the early 14th century. As part of the full plate armour of the Late Middle Ages and Renaissance the rerebrace was a tubular piece of armour between the shoulder defences (spaulder or pauldron) and the elbow protection (couter).
