= Plate armour =

Personal body armour made from metal plates

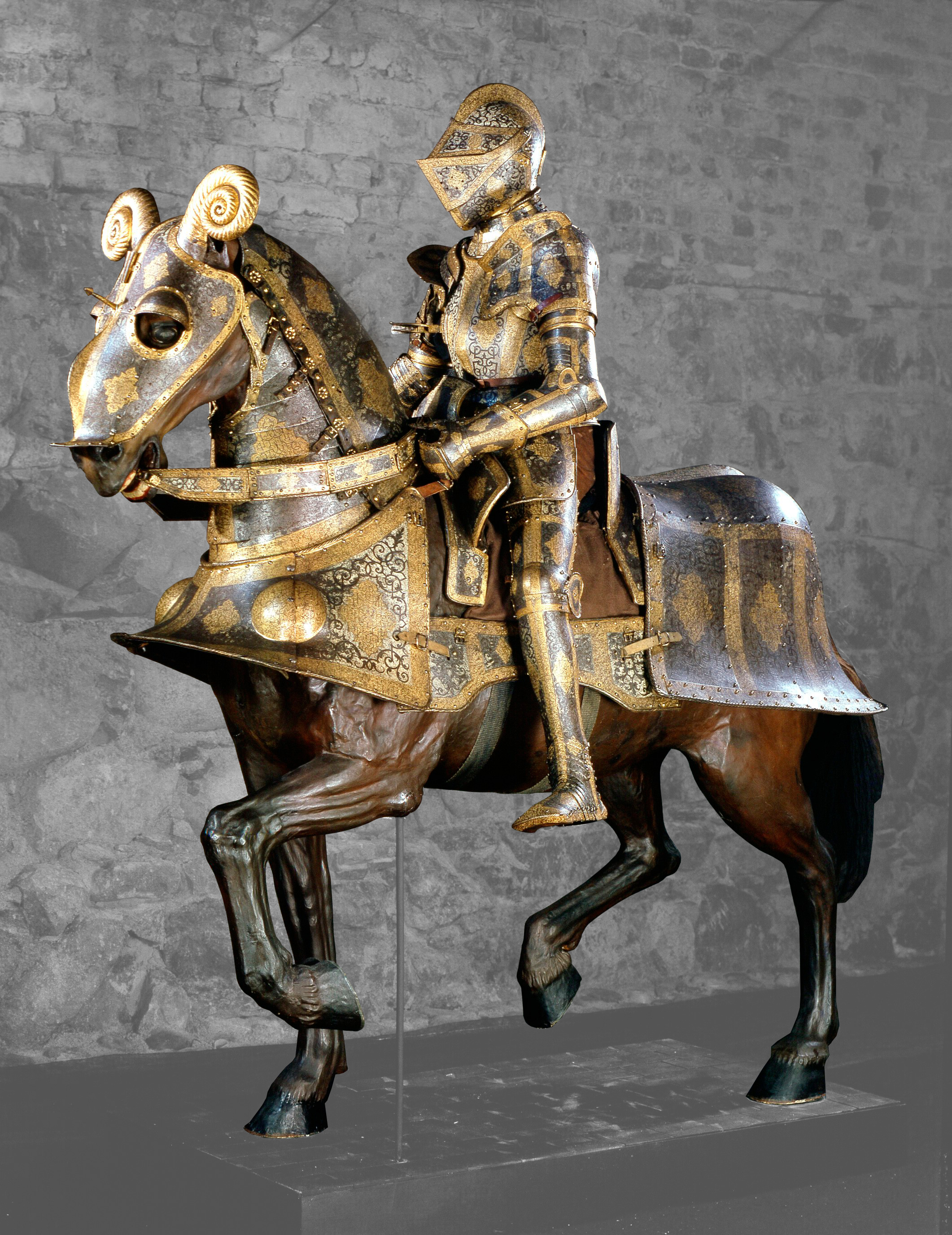
Full plate armour for man and horse commissioned by Sigismund II Augustus of Poland, held at the Livrustkammaren in Stockholm, Sweden (1550s)

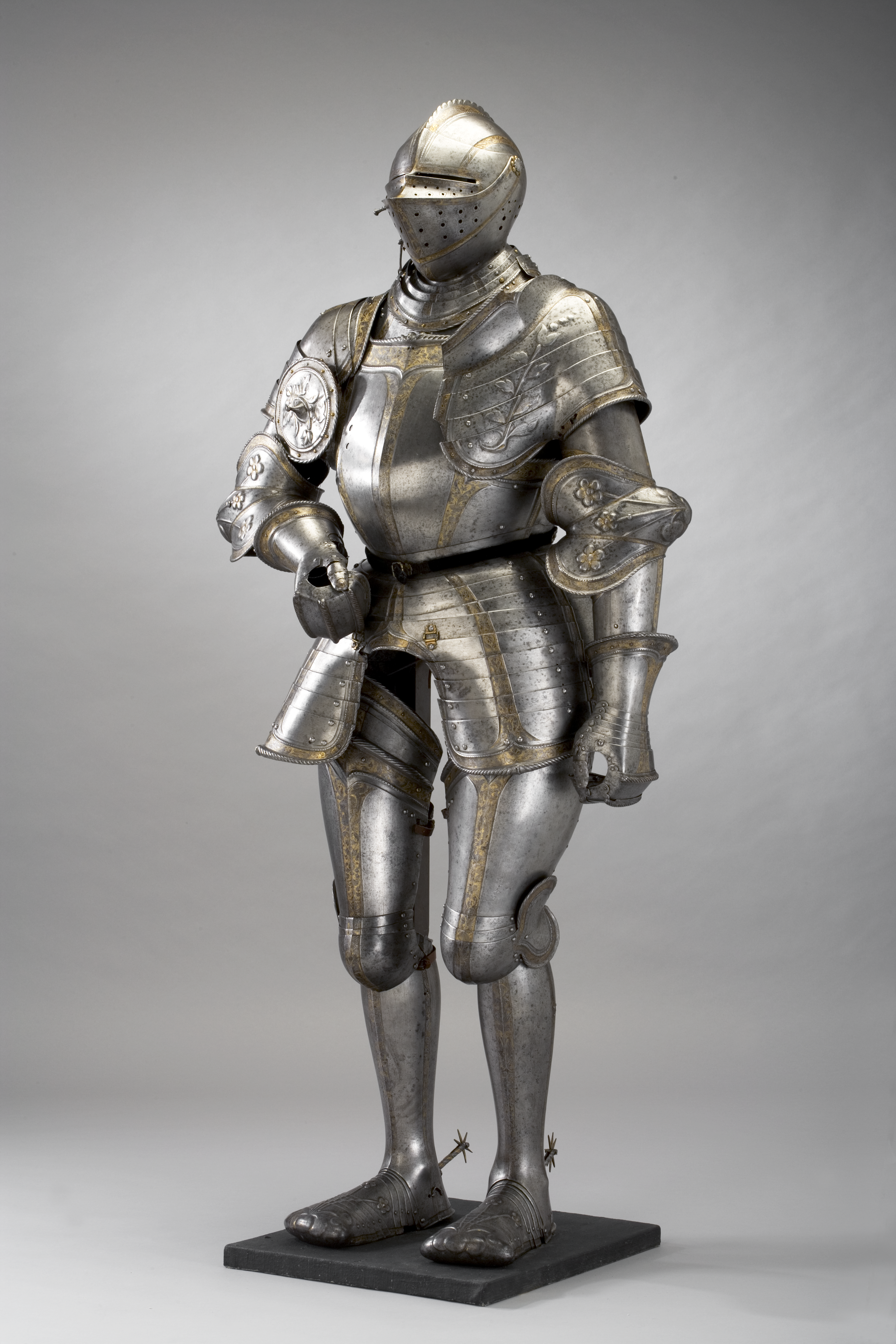
Armour for Gustav I of Sweden by Kunz Lochner, c. 1540 (Livrustkammaren).

Plate armour is a historical type of personal body armour made from bronze, iron, or steel plates, culminating in suits of armour which entirely or mostly encased the wearer. Full plate steel armour developed in Europe during the Late Middle Ages, especially in the context of the Hundred Years' War, from the coat of plates (popular in late 13th and early 14th century) worn over mail suits during the 14th century, a century famous for transitional armour.

In Europe, full plate armour reached its peak in the 15th and 16th centuries. The full suit of armour, also referred to as a panoply, is thus a feature of the very end of the Middle Ages and the Renaissance period. Its popular association with the "medieval knight" is due to the specialised jousting armour which developed in the 16th century.

Full suits of Gothic and Milanese plate armour were worn on the battlefields of the Burgundian Wars, the Wars of the Roses, the Polish–Teutonic Wars, the Eighty Years' War, the French Wars of Religion, the Italian Wars, the Hungarian–Ottoman Wars, the Ottoman–Habsburg wars, the Polish–Ottoman Wars, a significant part of the Hundred Years' War, and even the Thirty Years' War. The most heavily armoured troops of the period were heavy cavalry, such as gendarmes and early cuirassiers, but the infantry troops of the Swiss mercenaries and the Landsknechts also took to wearing lighter suits of "three quarters" munition armour, leaving the lower legs unprotected.

The use of plate armour began to decline in the early 17th century, but it remained common both among the nobility (e.g., the Emperor Ferdinand II, Louis XIII, Philip IV of Spain, Maurice of Orange and Gustavus Adolphus) and cuirassiers throughout the European wars of religion. After the mid-17th century, plate armour was mostly reduced to the simple breastplate or cuirass worn by cuirassiers, with the exception of the Polish Hussars that still used considerable amounts of plate. This was due to concerns over the weight of plate armour interfering with mobility coupled with views that the musket could penetrate common armour at range. For infantry, the breastplate gained renewed importance with the development of shrapnel in the late Napoleonic Wars. The use of steel plates sewn into flak jackets dates to World War II, and was replaced by more modern materials such as fibre-reinforced plastic, since the mid-20th century.

Mail armour is a layer of protective clothing worn most commonly from the 9th to the 14th centuries, though it would continue to be worn under plate armour until the 15th century. Mail was made from hundreds of small interlinking iron or steel rings sometimes held together by rivets. It was made this way so that it would be able to follow the contour of the wearer's body, maximizing comfort and minimizing unnecessary weight. Mail armour was designed mainly to defend against thrusting and cutting weapons, rather than bludgeons. Typical clothing articles made of mail at the time would be coifs, gloves, and chausses. From the 10th to the 13th century, mail armour was so popular in Europe that it was known as the age of mail.

== Early history ==
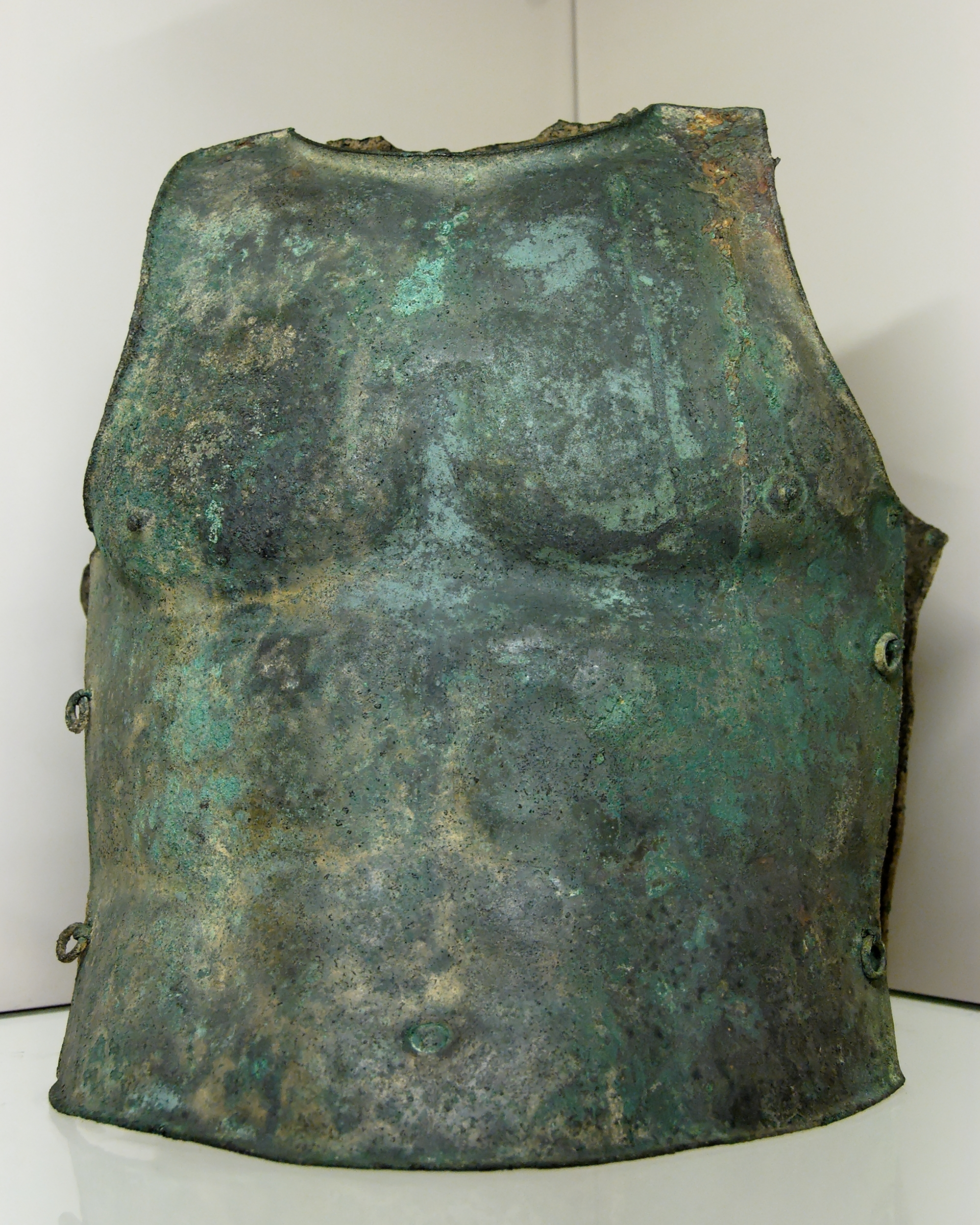
Bronze muscle cuirass, Italy, c. 350–300 BC

Partial plate armour, made out of bronze, which protected the chest and the lower limbs, was used by the ancient Greeks, as early as the late Bronze Age. The Dendra panoply protected the entire torso on both sides and included shoulder and neck protections. Less restrictive and heavy armour would become more widespread in the form of the muscle cuirass during classical antiquity before being superseded by other types of armour. Parthian and Sassanian heavy cavalry known to the Romans as clibanarii used cuirasses made out of scales or mail and small, overlapping plates in the manner of the manica for the protection of arms and legs. Plate armour in the form of the lorica segmentata was used by the Roman empire between the 1st century BC and 4th century AD.

Single plates of metal armour were again used from the late 13th century on, to protect joints and shins, and these were worn over a mail hauberk. Gradually the number of plate components of medieval armour increased, protecting further areas of the body, and in barding those of a cavalryman's horse. Armourers developed skills in articulating the lames or individual plates for parts of the body that needed to be flexible, and in fitting armour to the individual wearer like a tailor. The cost of a full suit of high quality fitted armour, as opposed to the cheaper munition armour (equivalent of ready-to-wear) was enormous, and inevitably restricted to the wealthy who were seriously committed to either soldiering or jousting. The rest of an army wore inconsistent mixtures of pieces, with mail still playing an important part.

== Japan ==
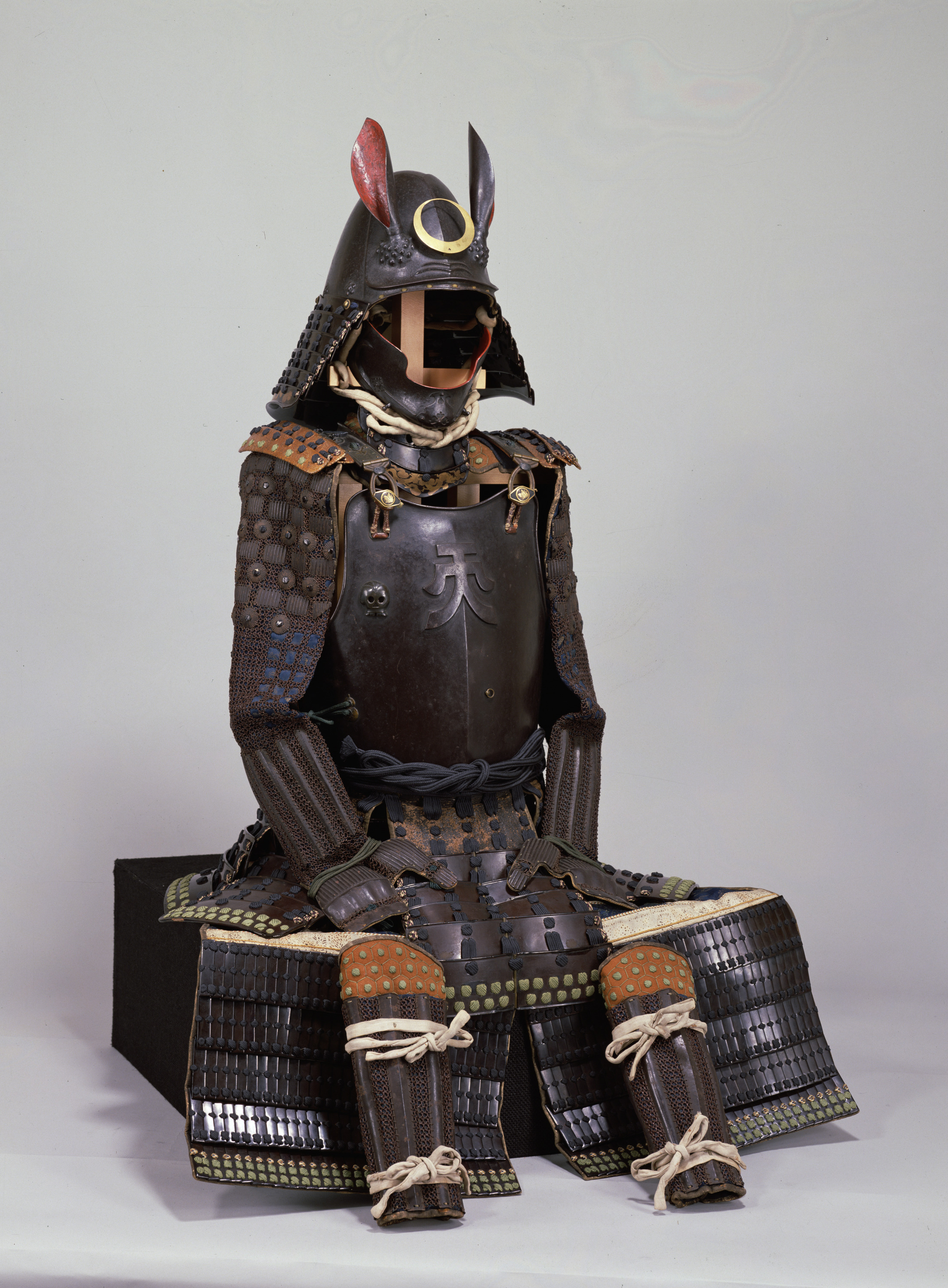
A Japanese 16th–17th century suit of plate armour with a western-style cuirass (nanban dō gusoku)

In the Kofun period (250–538), iron plate cuirasses (tankō) and helmets were being made. Plate armour was used in Japan during the Nara period (646–793); both plate and lamellar armours have been found in burial mounds, and haniwa (ancient clay figures) have been found depicting warriors wearing full armour.

In Japan, the warfare of the Sengoku period (1467–1615) required large quantities of armour to be produced for the ever-growing armies of foot soldiers (ashigaru). Simple munition-quality chest armours (dō) and helmets (kabuto) were mass-produced.

In 1543, the Portuguese brought matchlock firearms (tanegashima) to Japan. As Japanese swordsmiths began mass-producing matchlock firearms and firearms became used in war, the use of Lamellar armour (ō-yoroi and dō-maru), previously used as samurai armour, gradually decreased. Japanese armour makers started to make new types of armour made of larger iron plate and plated leather. This new suit of armour is called tōsei gusoku (gusoku), which means modern armour. The type of gusoku, which covered the front and back of the body with a single iron plate with a raised center and a V-shaped bottom like plate armour, was specifically called nanban dou gusoku ("Western style gusoku") and was used by some samurai. Japanese armour makers designed bulletproof plate armour called tameshi gusoku ("bullet tested"), which allowed soldiers to continue wearing armour despite the heavy use of firearms in the late 16th century.

In the 17th century, warfare in Japan came to an end, but the samurai continued to use plate armour until the end of the samurai era in the 1860s, with the known last use of samurai armour occurring in 1877, during the Satsuma rebellion.

== Late Middle Ages ==
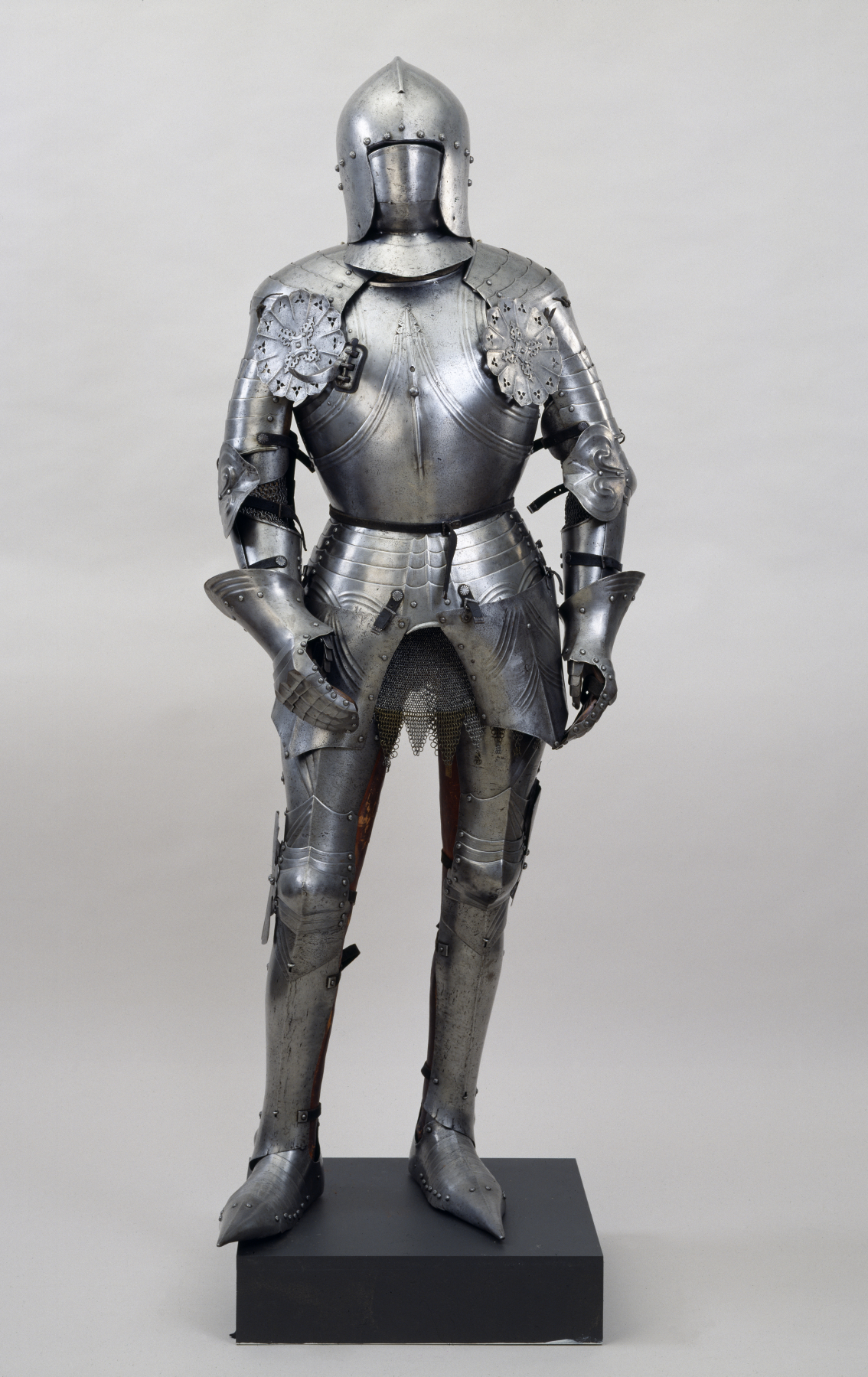
Italian suit of armour with sallet, c. 1450, by Antonio Missaglia from Canzo.

By about 1420, complete suits of plate armour had been developed in Europe. A full suit of plate armour would have consisted of a helmet, a gorget (or bevor), spaulders, pauldrons with gardbraces to cover the armpits as was seen in French armour, or besagews (also known as rondels) which were mostly used in Gothic Armour, rerebraces, couters, vambraces, gauntlets, a cuirass (breastplate and backplate) with a fauld, tassets and a culet, a mail skirt, cuisses, poleyns, greaves, and sabatons. The very fullest sets, known as garnitures, more often made for jousting than war, included pieces of exchange, alternate pieces suiting different purposes, so that the suit could be configured for a range of different uses, for example fighting on foot or on horse. By the Late Middle Ages even infantry could afford to wear several pieces of plate armour. Armour production was a profitable and pervasive industry during the Middle Ages and the Renaissance.

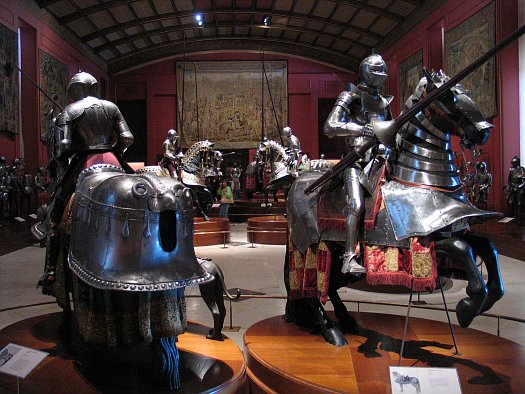
Royal Armoury of Madrid, Spain

A complete suit of plate armour made from well-tempered steel would weigh around 15–25 kg (33–55 lb). The wearer remained highly agile and could jump, run and otherwise move freely as the weight of the armour was spread evenly throughout the body. The armour was articulated and covered a man's entire body completely from neck to toe. In the 15th and 16th centuries, plate-armoured soldiers were the nucleus of every army. Large bodies of men-at-arms numbering thousands, or even more than ten thousand men (approximately 60% to 70% of French armies were men-at-arms and the percentage was also high in other countries), were fighting on foot, wearing full plate next to archers and crossbowmen. This was commonly seen in the Western European armies, especially during the Hundred Years War, the Wars of the Roses or the Italian Wars.

European leaders in armouring techniques were Northern Italians, especially from Milan, and Southern Germans, who had somewhat different styles. But styles were diffused around Europe, often by the movement of armourers; the Renaissance Greenwich armour was made by a royal workshop near London that had imported Italian, Flemish and (mostly) German craftsmen, though it soon developed its own unique style. Ottoman Turkey also made wide use of plate armour, but incorporated large amounts of mail into their armour, which was widely used by shock troops such as the Janissary Corps.

=== Effect on weapon development ===
15th-century depiction of a melee. A breast plate is pierced by a sword

Plate armour gave the wearer very good protection against sword cuts, as well against spear thrusts, and provided decent defense against blunt weapons.

The evolution of plate armour also triggered developments in the design of offensive weapons. While this armour was effective against cuts or strikes, their weak points could be exploited by thrusting weapons, such as estocs, poleaxes, and halberds. The effect of arrows and bolts is still a point of contention with regard to plate armour. The evolution of the 14th-century plate armour also triggered the development of various polearms. They were designed to deliver a strong impact and concentrate energy on a small area and cause damage through the plate. Maces, war hammers, and pollaxes (poleaxes) were used to inflict blunt force trauma through armour. Strong blows to the head could result in concussion, even if the armour was not penetrated.

Fluted plate was not only decorative, but also reinforced the plate against bending under striking or blunt impact. This offsets against the tendency for flutes to catch piercing blows. In armoured techniques taught in the German school of swordsmanship, the attacker concentrates on these "weak spots", resulting in a fighting style very different from unarmoured sword-fighting. Because of this weakness, most warriors wore a mail shirt (haubergeon or hauberk) beneath their plate armour (or coat of plates). Later, full mail shirts were replaced with mail patches, called gussets, which were sewn onto a gambeson or arming jacket. Further protection for plate armour was the use of small round plates called besagews, that covered the armpit area and the addition of couters and poleyns with "wings" to protect the inside of the joint.

== Renaissance ==
German so-called Maximilian armour of the early 16th century is a style using heavy fluting and some decorative etching, as opposed to the plainer finish on 15th-century white armour. The shapes include influence from Italian styles. This era also saw the use of closed helms, as opposed to the 15th-century-style sallets and barbutes. During the early 16th century, the helmet and neckguard design was reformed to produce the so-called Nürnberg armour, many of them masterpieces of workmanship and design.

As firearms became better and more common on the battlefield, the utility of full armour gradually declined, and full suits became restricted to those made for jousting which continued to develop. The decoration of fine armour greatly increased in the period, using a range of techniques, and further greatly increasing the cost. Elaborately decorated plate armour for royalty and the very wealthy was being produced. Highly decorated armour is often called parade armour, a somewhat misleading term as such armour might well be worn on active military service. Steel plate armour for Henry II of France, made in 1555, is covered with meticulous embossing, which has been subjected to blueing, silvering and gilding.

Such work required armourers to either collaborate with artists or have artistic skill of their own; another alternative was to take designs from ornament prints and other prints, as was often done. Daniel Hopfer was an etcher of armour by training, who developed etching as a form of printmaking. Other artists such as Hans Holbein the Younger produced designs for armour. The Milanese armourer Filippo Negroli, from a leading dynasty of armourers, was the most famous modeller of figurative relief decoration on armour.

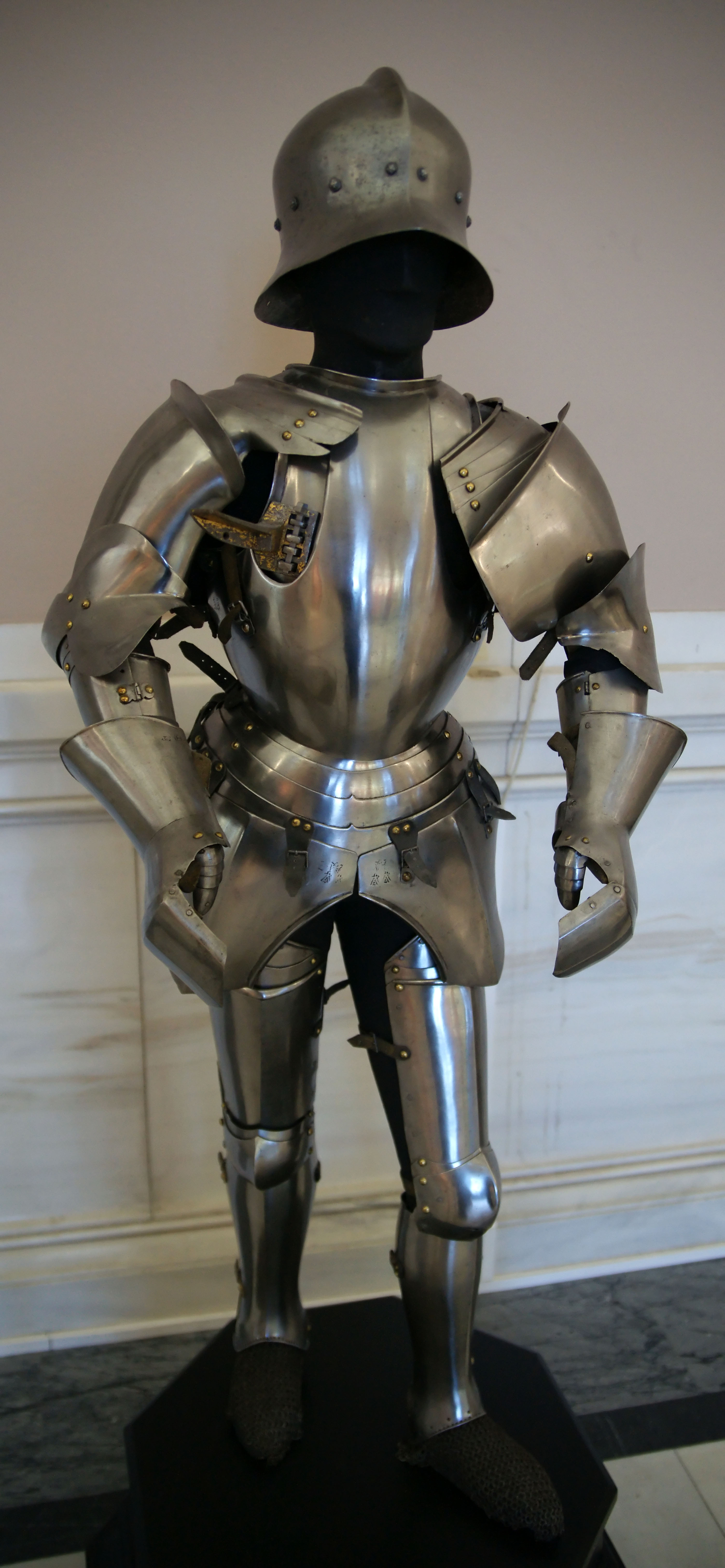
Suit of armour of the Italian condottiero Roberto Sanseverino d'Aragona

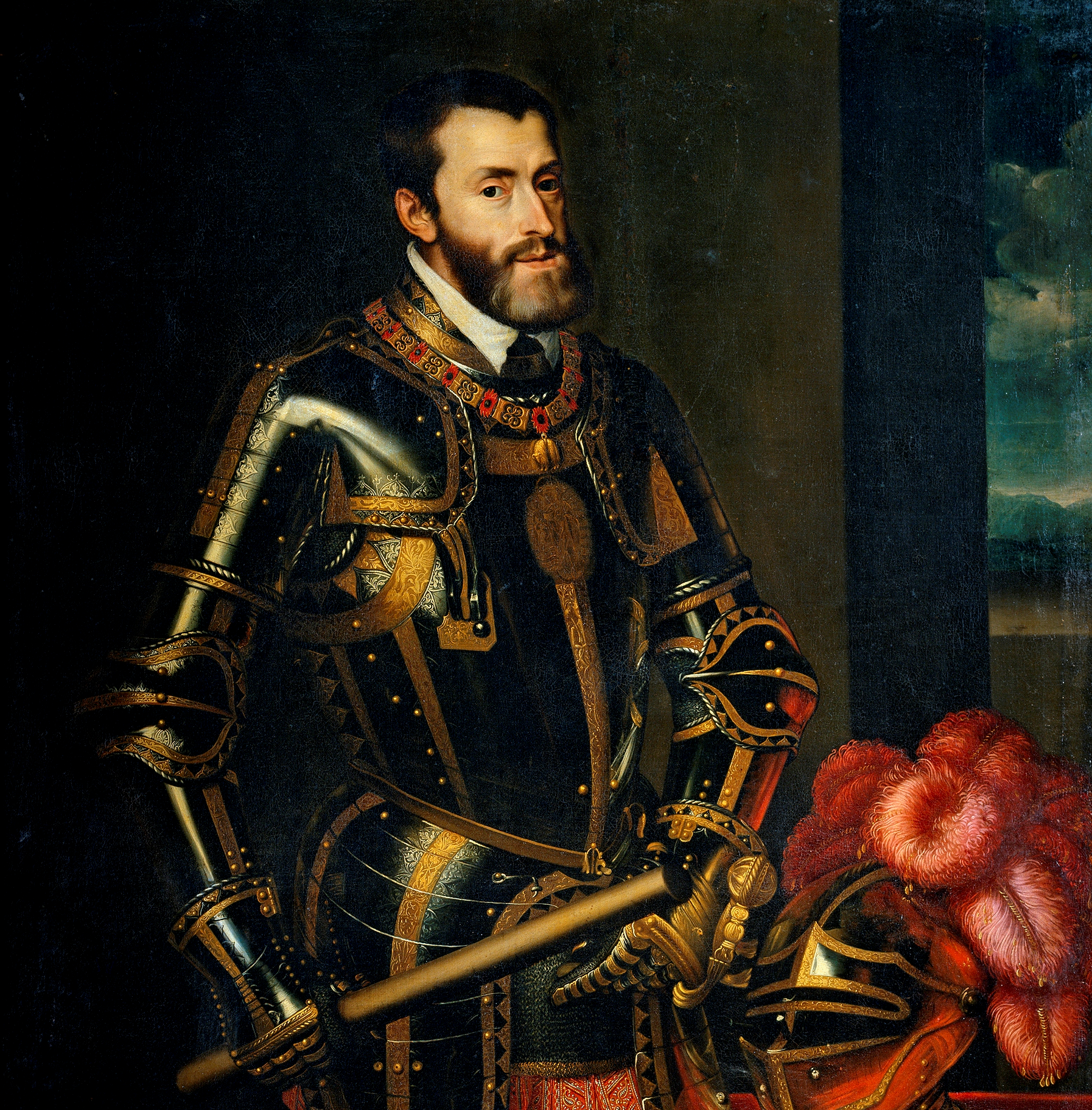
Painting of Charles V, Holy Roman Emperor by Juan Pantoja de la Cruz (c. 1605), after an original by Titian, depicting an elaborate Renaissance-era suit of armour.

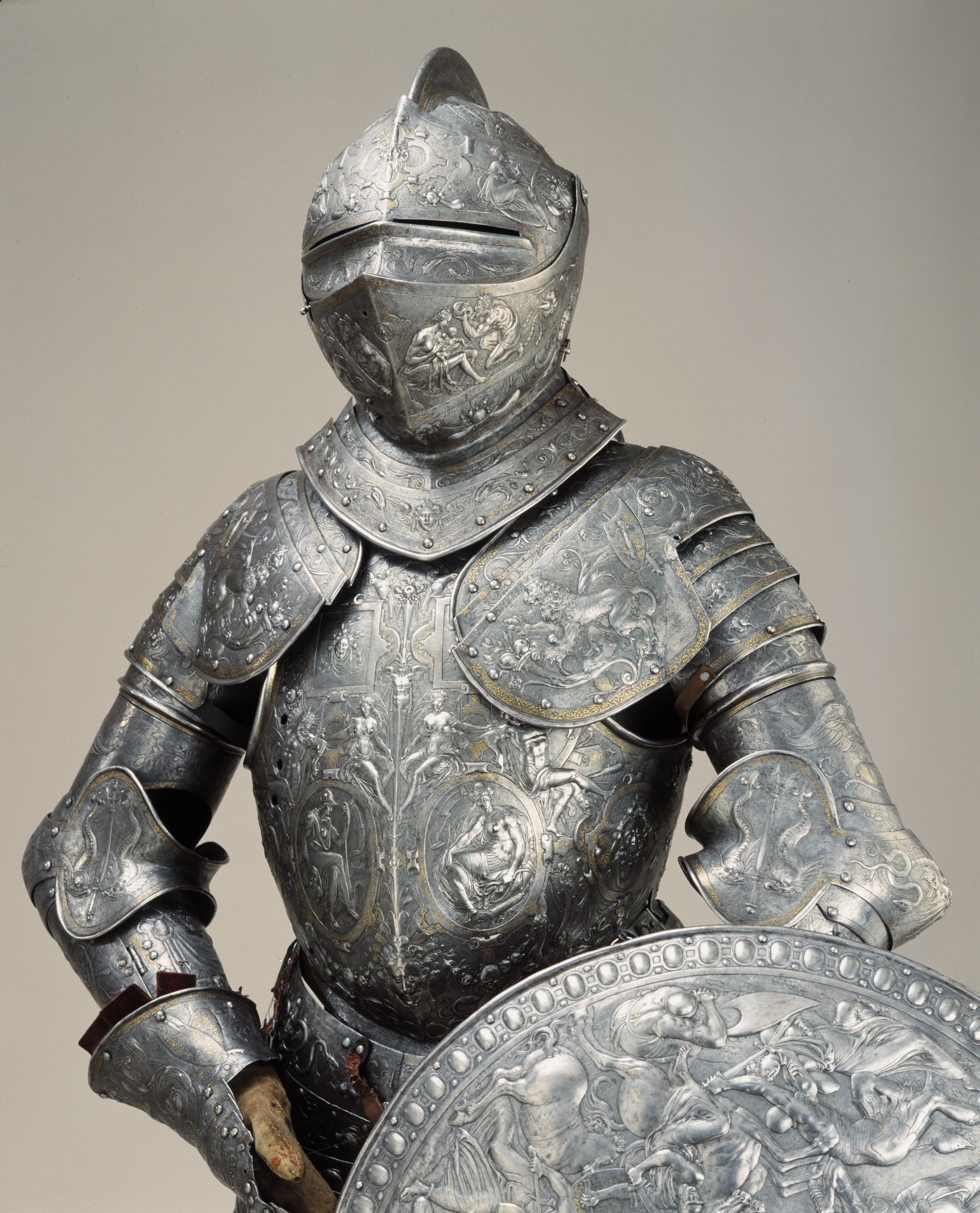
Parade armour from 1562, belonged to Erik XIV of Sweden. Made by Eliseus Libaerts and Etienne Delaune.

=== Infantry ===
Reduced plate armour, typically consisting of a breastplate, a burgonet, morion or cabasset and gauntlets, however, also became popular among 16th-century mercenaries, and there are many references to so-called munition armour being ordered for infantrymen at a fraction of the cost of full plate armour. This mass-produced armour was often heavier and made of lower quality metal than fine armour for commanders.

=== Jousting ===
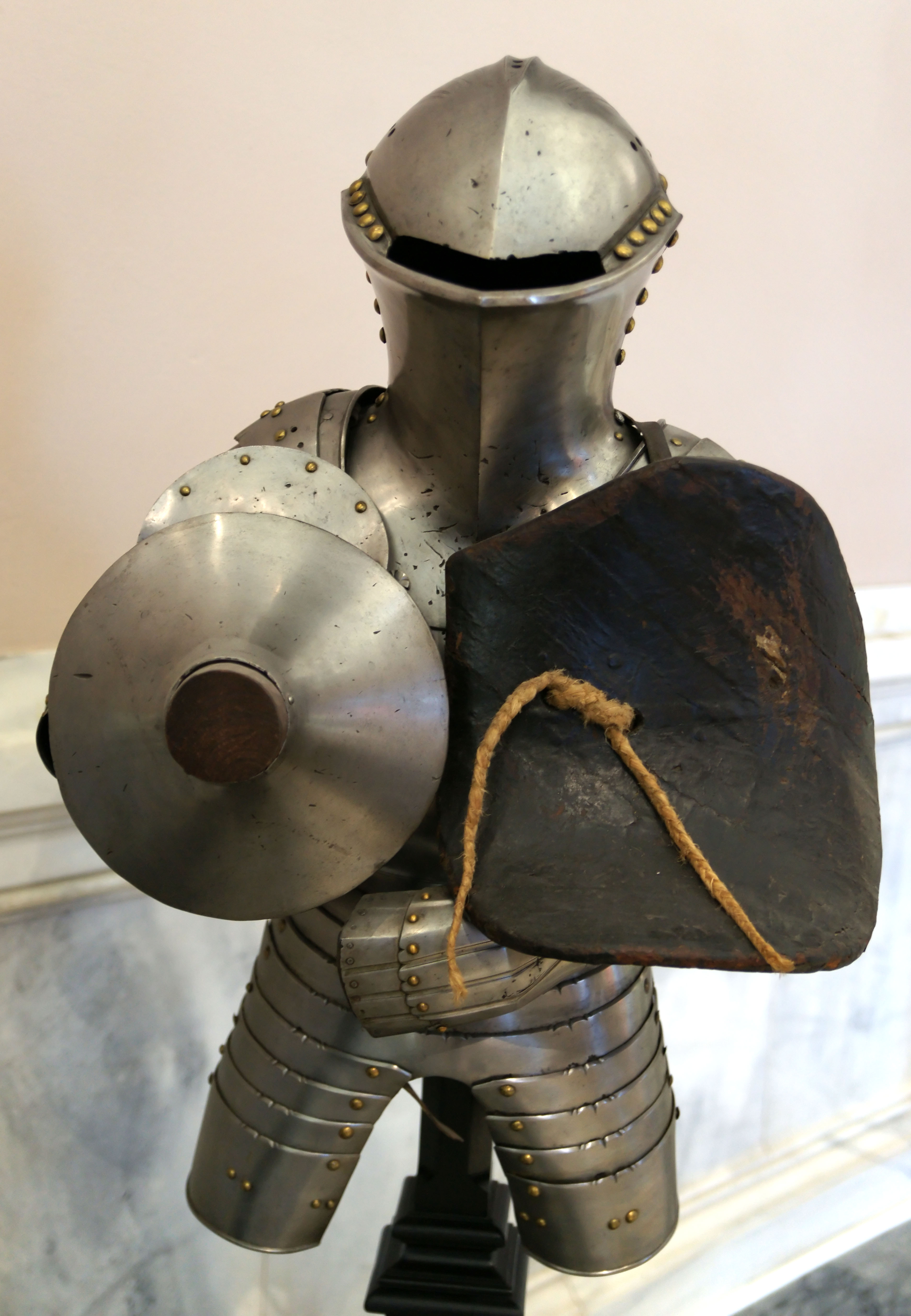
The Stechzeug of John the Constant (c. 1500)

Specialised jousting armour produced in the late 15th to 16th century was heavier, and could weigh as much as 50 kg (110 lb), as it was not intended for free combat, it did not need to permit free movement, the only limiting factor being the maximum weight that could be carried by a warhorse of the period.

The medieval joust has its origins in the military tactics of heavy cavalry during the High Middle Ages. Since the 15th century, jousting had become a sport (hastilude) with less direct relevance to warfare, for example using separate specialized armour and equipment.

During the 1490s, emperor Maximilian I invested a great deal of effort in perfecting the sport, for which he received his nickname of "The Last Knight". Rennen and Stechen were two sportive forms of the joust developed during the 15th century and practiced throughout the 16th century. The armours used for these two respective styles of the joust were known as Rennzeug and Stechzeug, respectively. The Stechzeug in particular developed into extremely heavy armour which completely inhibited the movement of the rider, in its latest forms resembling an armour-shaped cabin integrated into the horse armour more than a functional suit of armour. Such forms of sportive equipment during the final phase of the joust in 16th-century Germany gave rise to modern misconceptions about the heaviness or clumsiness of "medieval armour", as notably popularised by Mark Twain's A Connecticut Yankee in King Arthur's Court.

The extremely heavy helmets of the Stechzeug are explained by the fact that the aim was to detach the crest of the opponent's helmet, resulting in frequent full impact of the lance to the helmet.

By contrast, the Rennen was a type of joust with lighter contact. Here, the aim was to hit the opponent's shield. The specialised Rennzeug was developed on the request of Maximilian, who desired a return to a more agile form of joust compared to the heavily armoured "full contact" Stechen. In the Rennzeug, the shield was attached to the armour with a mechanism of springs and would detach itself upon contact.

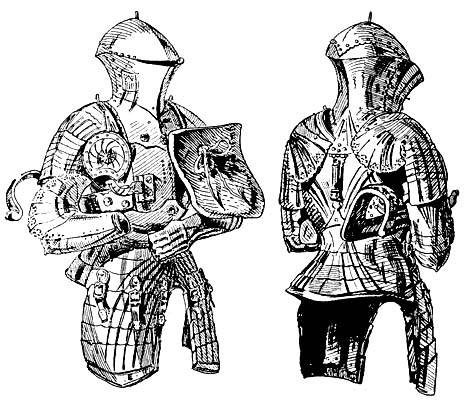
Stechzeug; note that the parts protecting the lower body and the legs were incorporated as part of the horse armour (not shown).

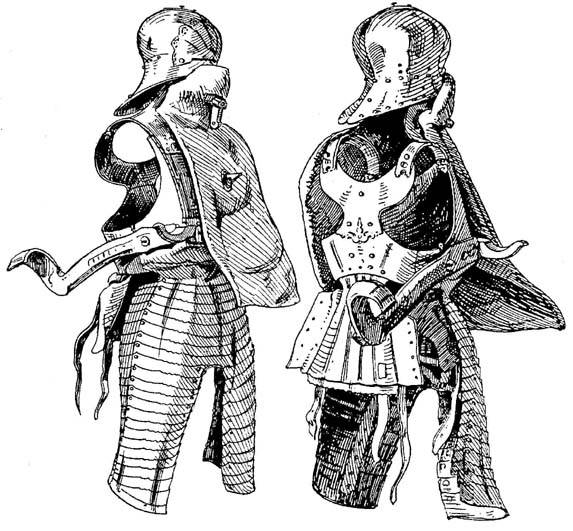
Rennzeug

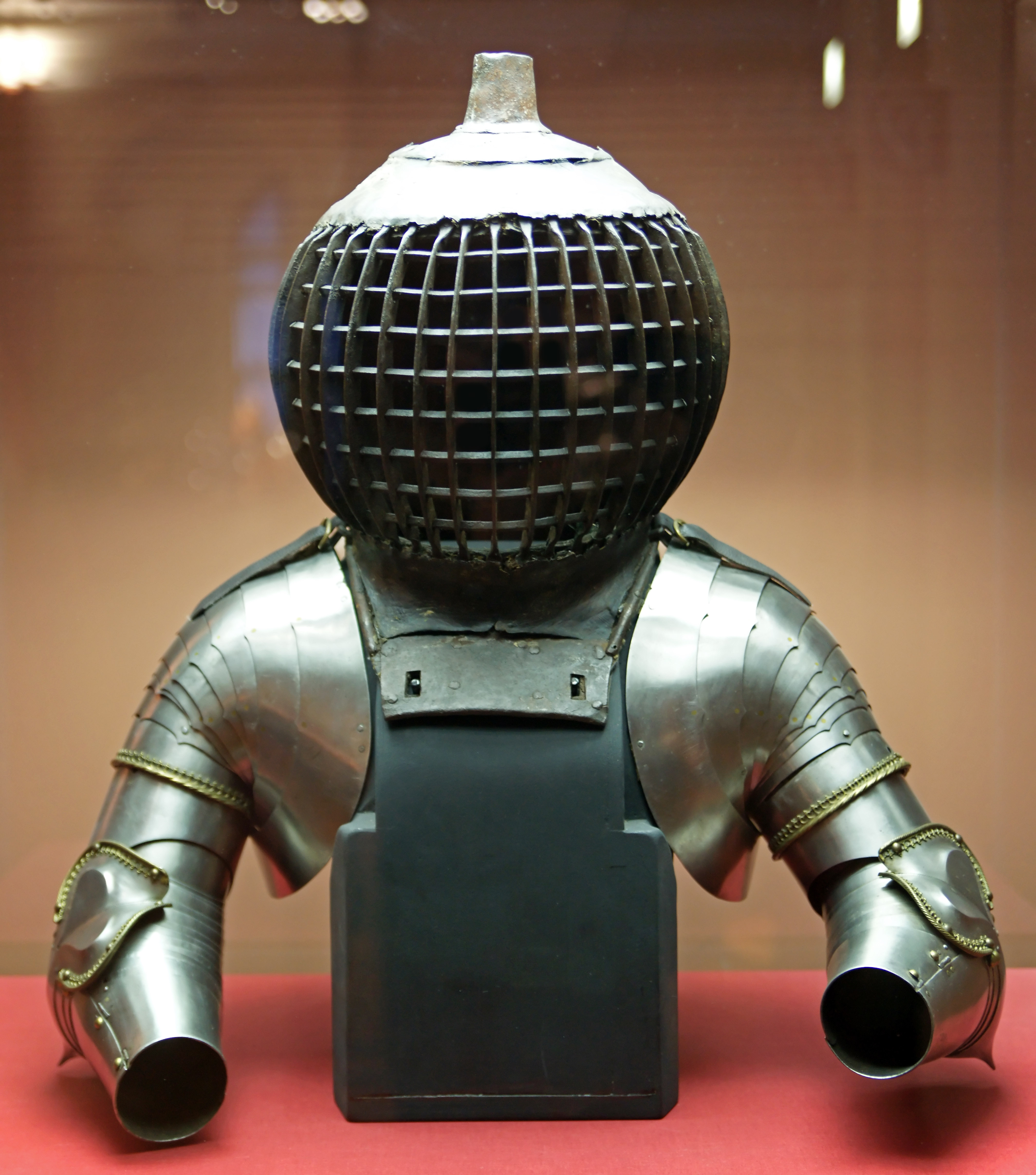
Armour designed for the Kolbenturnier, dated to the 1480s. The Kolbenturnier was a late form of the tournament, unlike the joust played with two teams using wooden clubs (Kolben) to hit opponents' helmet crests.

== Early modern period ==
Plate armour was widely used by most armies until the end of the 17th century for both foot and mounted troops such as the cuirassiers, London lobsters, dragoons, demi-lancers and Polish hussars. The infantry armour of the 16th century developed into the Savoyard type of three-quarters armour by 1600.

Full plate armour was expensive to produce and remained therefore restricted to the upper strata of society; lavishly decorated suits of armour remained the fashion with 18th-century nobles and generals long after they had ceased to be militarily useful on the battlefield due to the advent of inexpensive muskets.

The development of powerful firearms made all but the finest and heaviest armour obsolete. The increasing power and availability of firearms and the nature of large, state-supported infantry led to more portions of plate armour being cast off in favour of cheaper, more mobile troops. Leg protection was the first part to go, replaced by tall leather boots. By the beginning of the 18th century, only field marshals, commanders and royalty remained in full armour on the battlefield, more as a sign of rank than for practical considerations. It remained fashionable for monarchs to be portrayed in armour during the first half of the 18th century (late Baroque period), but even this tradition became obsolete. Thus, a portrait of Frederick the Great in 1739 still shows him in armour, while a later painting showing him as a commander in the Seven Years' War (c. 1760) depicts him without armour.

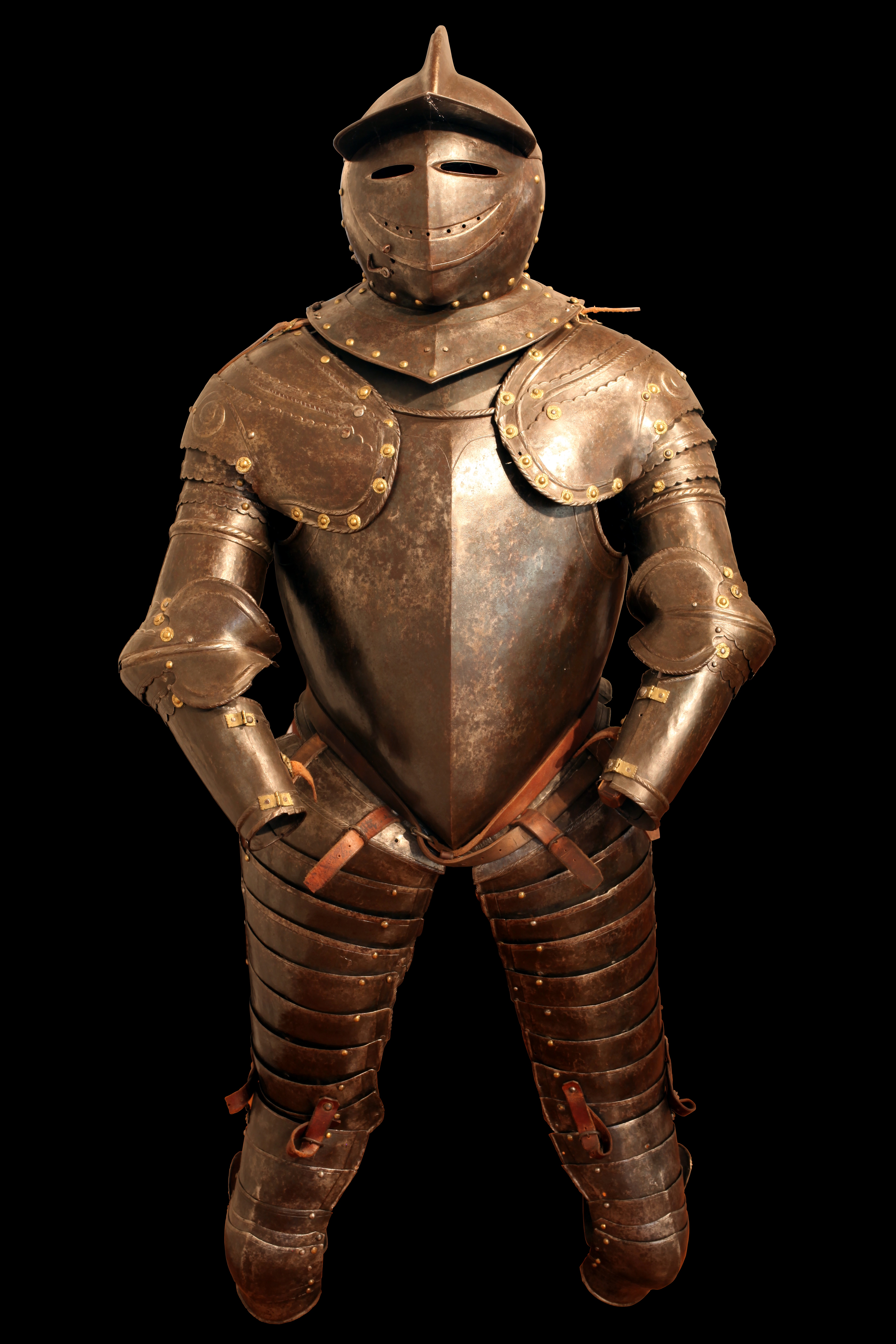
Savoyard munition armour, c. 1600

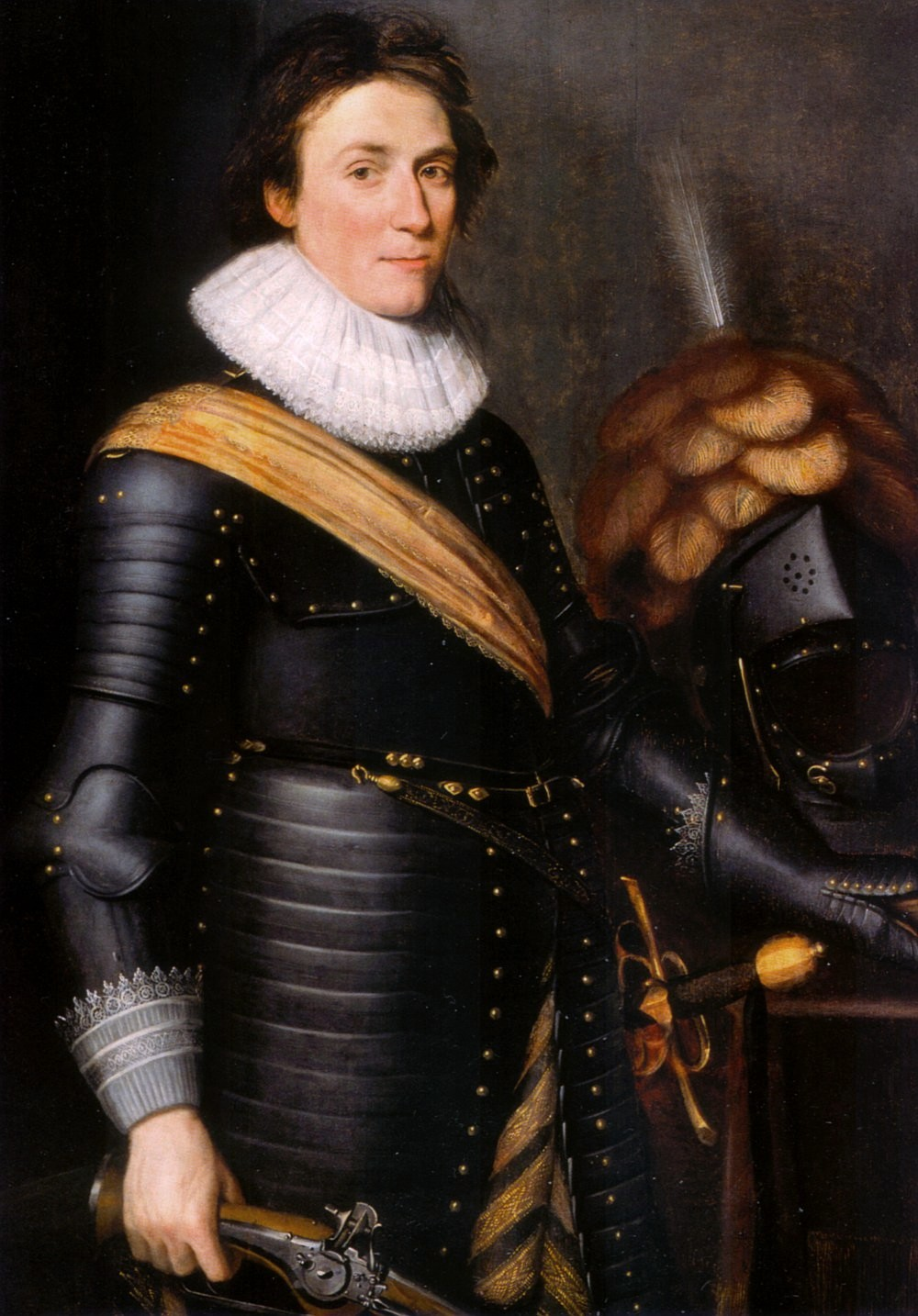
Christian the Younger of Brunswick wearing cuirassier armour (1620)

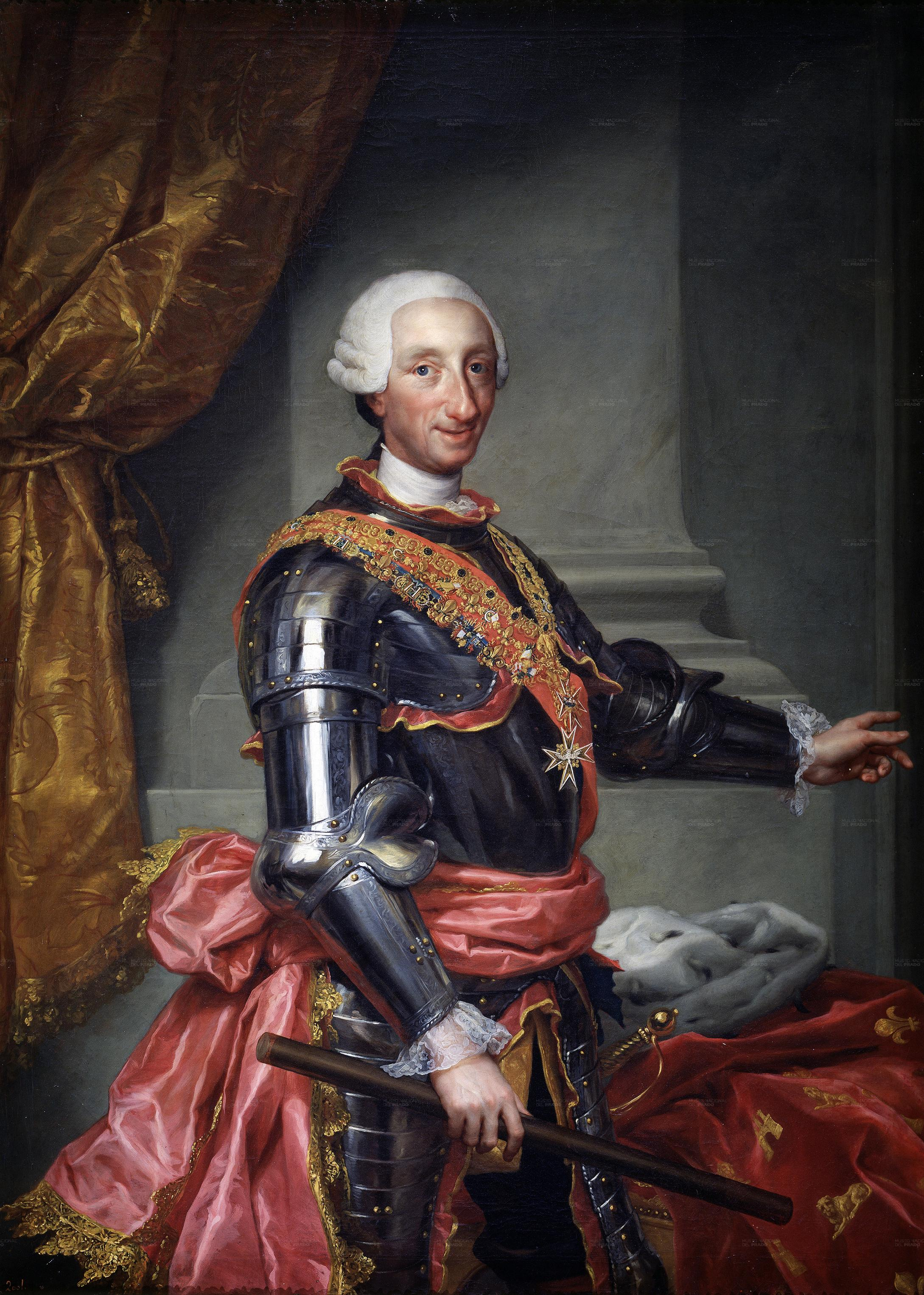
Portrait of Charles III of Spain in a suit of armour (1761).

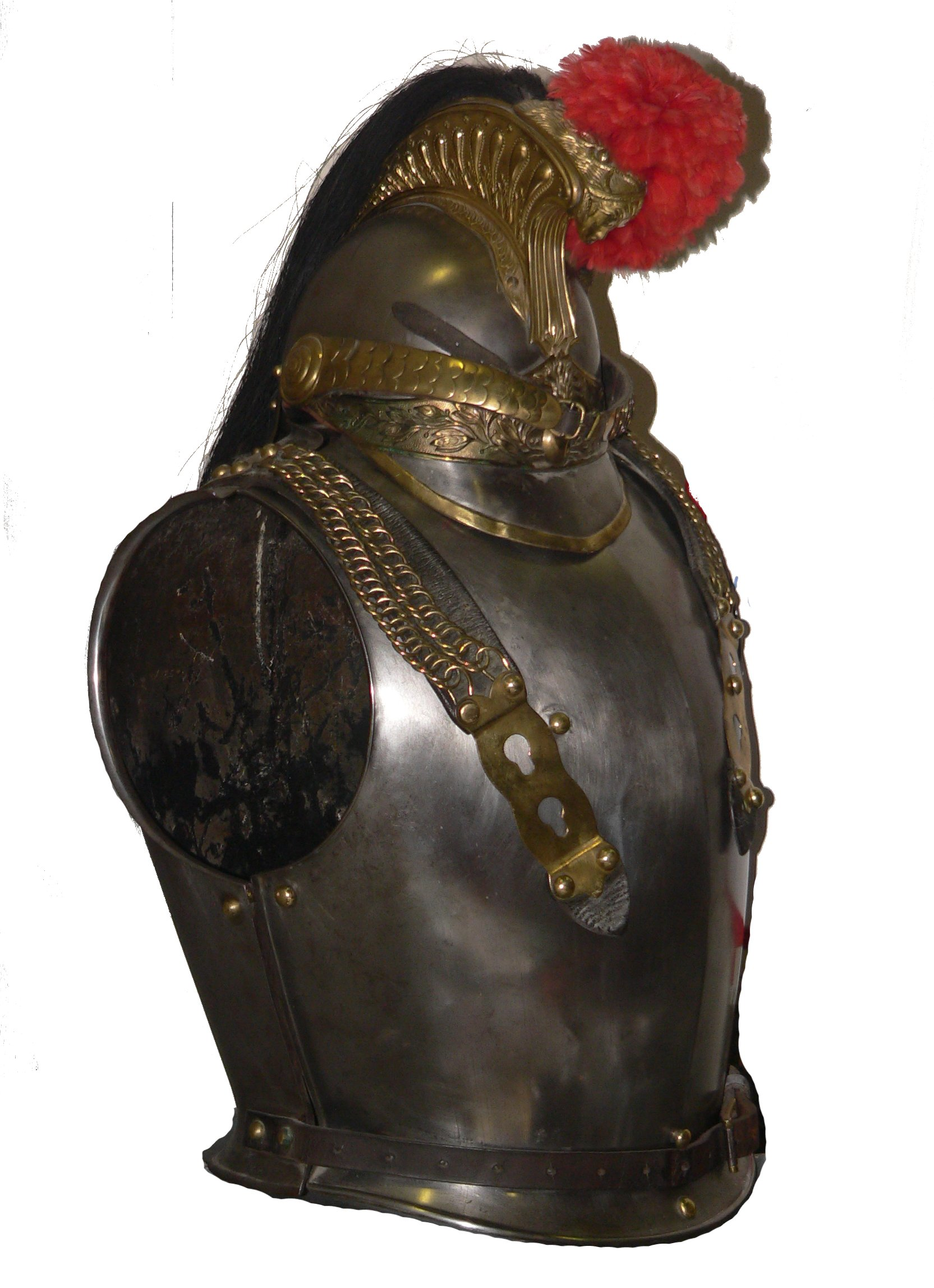
French cuirassier armour (1854).

== Modern body armour ==
Body armour made a brief reappearance in the American Civil War with mixed success.

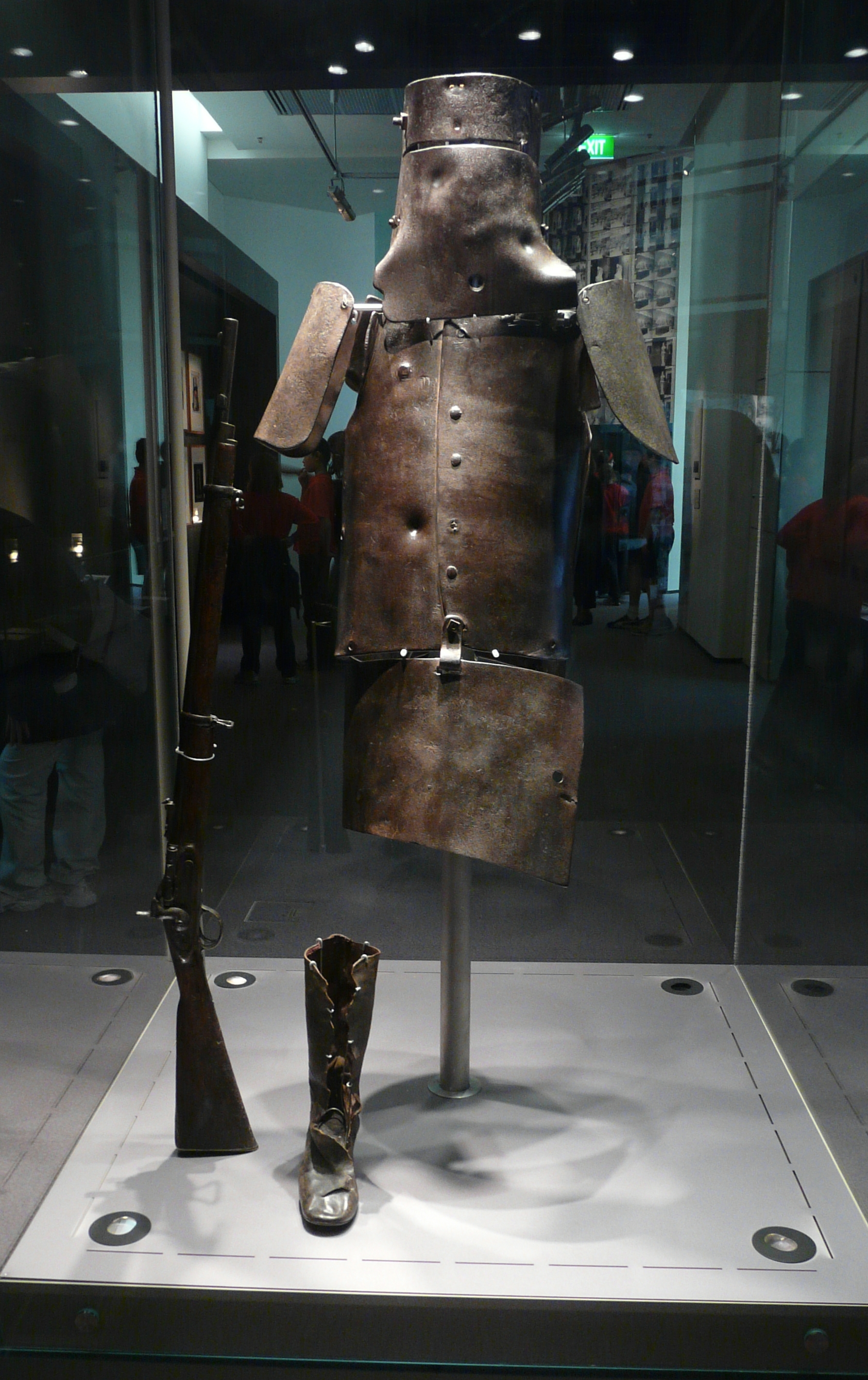
Australian bushranger and outlaw Ned Kelly's armour (1880) on display in the State Library of Victoria

Plate armour was famously used in Australia by the Kelly gang, a group of four outlawed bushrangers led by Ned Kelly, who had constructed four suits of improvised armour from plough mouldboards and whose crime spree culminated with a shootout with police at the town of Glenrowan in 1880. The armour was reasonably effective against bullets and made Kelly seem invincible to the policemen, who likened him to an evil spirit or bunyip. However it left the limbs exposed; during the infamous "Glenrowan Affair", gang member Joe Byrne was killed by a bullet to the femoral artery, Kelly was captured after a 15-minute last stand against police (having sustained a total of 28 bullet wounds over his body), and the remaining two members are thought to have committed suicide shortly after. Although the recovered suits were almost immediately mismatched, they have since been reorganized and restored, and have attained iconic status within Australian culture.

During World War I, both sides experimented with shrapnel armour, and some soldiers used their own dedicated ballistic armour such as the American Brewster Body Shield, although none were widely produced. The heavy cavalry armour (cuirass) used by the German, British, and French empires during the Napoleonic Wars, were actively used until the first few months of World War I, when French cuirassiers went to meet the enemy dressed in armour outside of Paris. The cuirass represents the final stage of the tradition of plate armour descended from the Late Middle Ages. Meanwhile, makeshift steel armour for protection against shrapnel and early forms of ballistic vests began development from the mid-19th century to the present day. In 1916, General Adrian of the French army provided an abdominal shield that was lightweight (approx. 1 kilogram) and easy to wear. A number of British officers recognised that many casualties could be avoided if effective armour were available.

The first usage of the term "flak jacket" refers to the armour originally developed by the Wilkinson Sword company during World War II to help protect Royal Air Force (RAF) air personnel from flying debris and shrapnel. The Red Army also made use of ballistic steel body armour, such as the Stalnoi Nagrudnik model of breastplate, for combat engineers and assault infantry.

After World War II, steel plates were soon replaced by vests made from synthetic fibre, in the 1950s, made of either boron carbide, silicon carbide, or aluminium oxide. They were issued to the crew of low-flying aircraft, such as the UH-1 and UC-123, during the Vietnam War. The synthetic fibre Kevlar was introduced in 1971, and most ballistic vests since the 1970s are based on kevlar, optionally with the addition of trauma plates to reduce the risk of blunt trauma injury. Such plates may be made of ceramic, metal (steel or titanium) or synthetic materials.

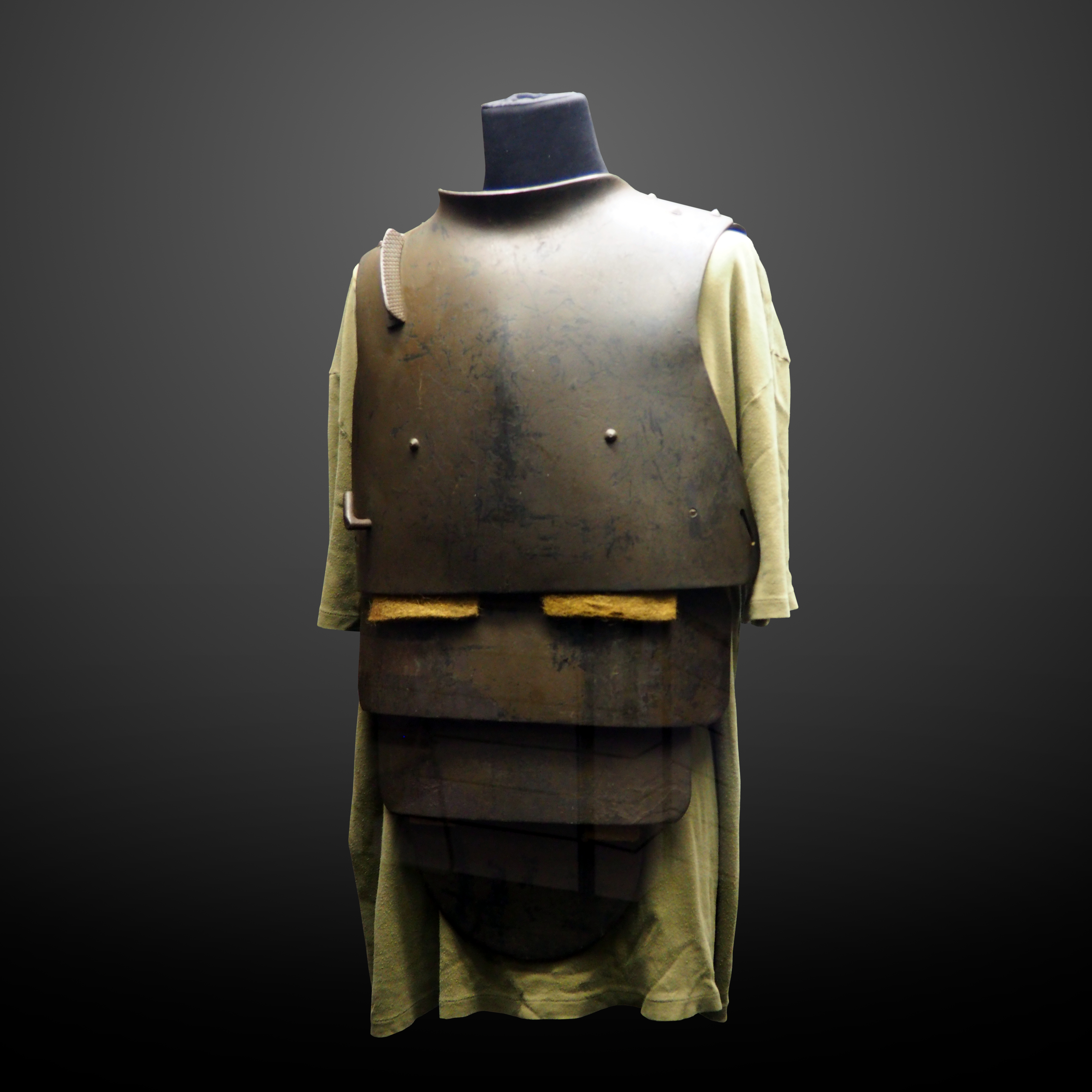
German body armour (Sappenpanzer; 1918)

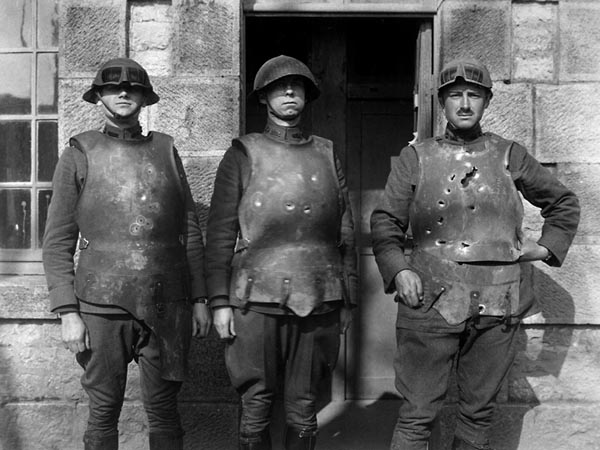
American cuirass of WWI after fire testing

== See also ==
- Armored combat (sport)
- Ballistic vest
- Components of medieval armour
- Harnischfechten
- Mirror armour
- Plated mail
- Proofing of armour
