= Proofing (armour) =

Testing of body armour against weapons

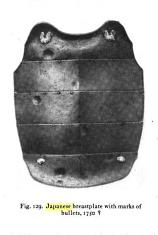
Japanese cuirass with bullet marks from being tested for resistance to firearms.

The proofing of armour is testing armour for its defensive ability, most commonly the historical testing of plate armour and mail (armour). In the early Middle Ages, armour would be classified by the blows it could withstand, being certified as proof against swords, axes, and arrows. As firearms emerged as battlefield weapons, armour would be tested against them, as well, from which came the modern term "bulletproof".

In Japan the testing of armor by arrow or a musket ball is called tameshi with the tested armor being called tameshi gusoku. Helmet and chest armors were tested and many examples of these armors showing the bullet test marks still exist. In the 14th century, Japanese individual scale armor pieces were said to have been tested by arrows before being assembled into an armor.
