= Culet (armour) =

Piece of plate armour protecting the buttocks

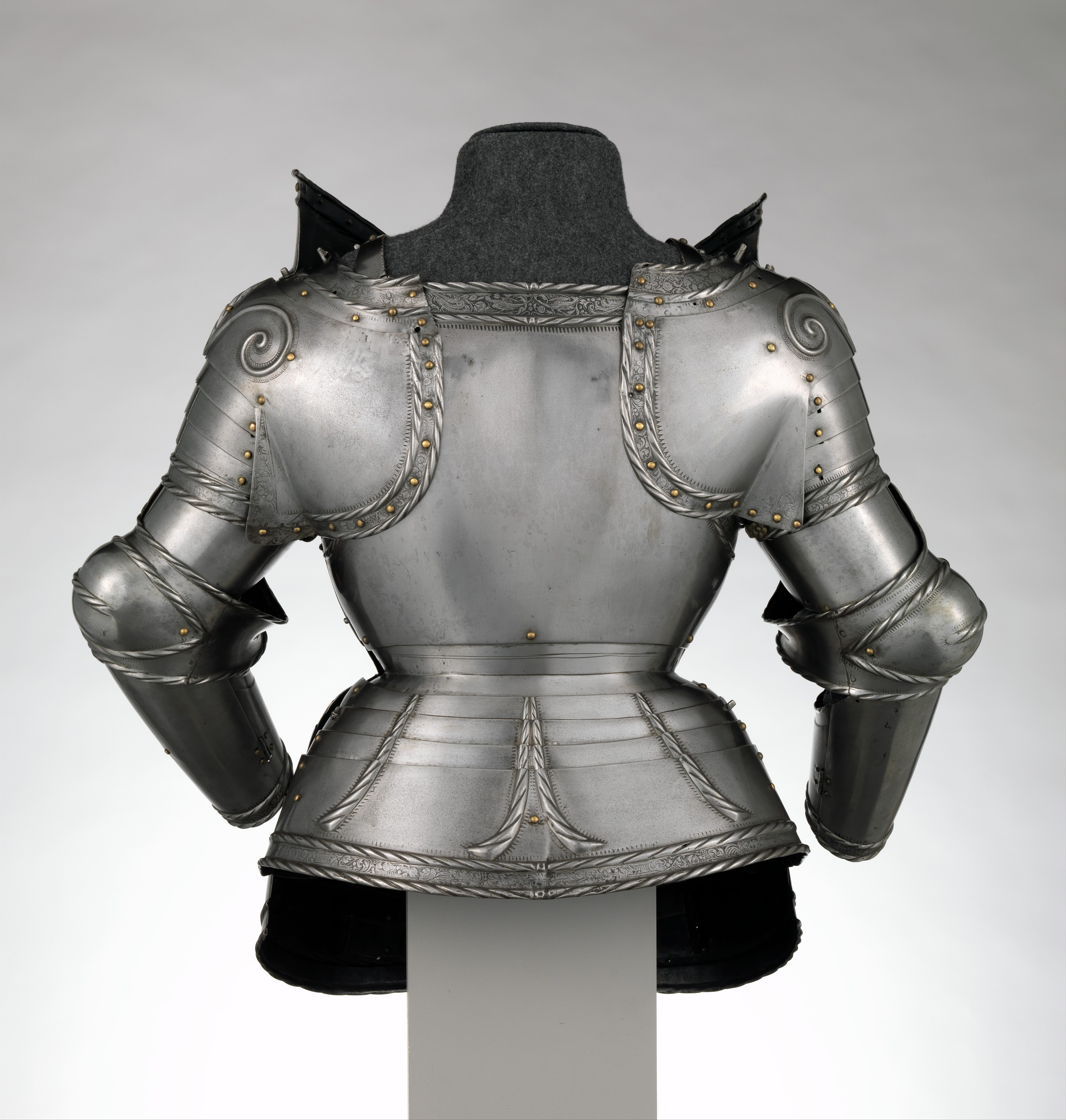
The lower section of this armour is the culet.

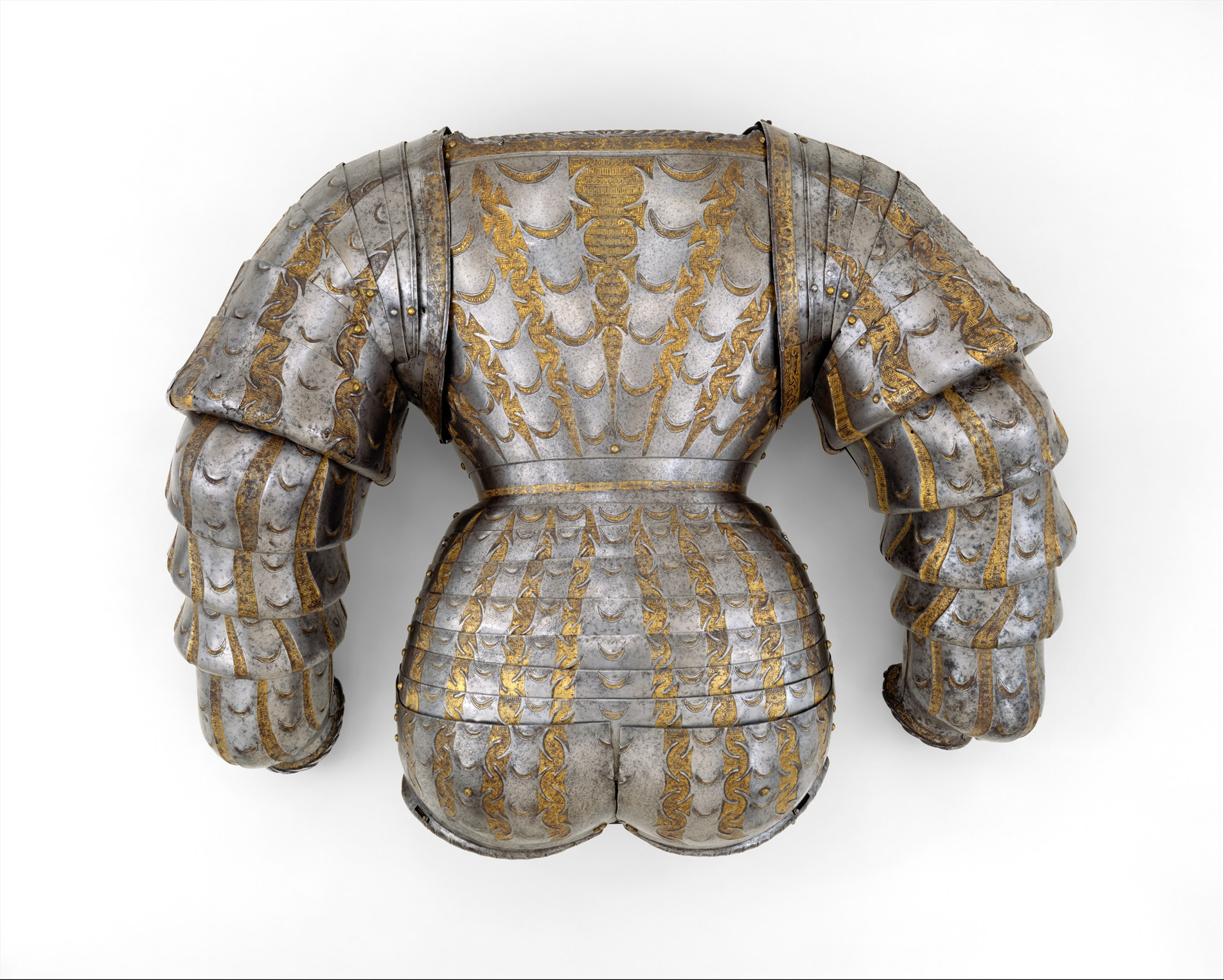
The lower section of this armour is the hoguine.

A culet (also spelled culette) is a piece of plate armour consisting of small, horizontal lames that protect the small of the back or the buttocks. Usually a skirt of chain mail or a mail brayette was worn underneath.

This armour was also referred to as a garde de rein or garde rein, or hoguine.
