= Couter =

Elbow armour

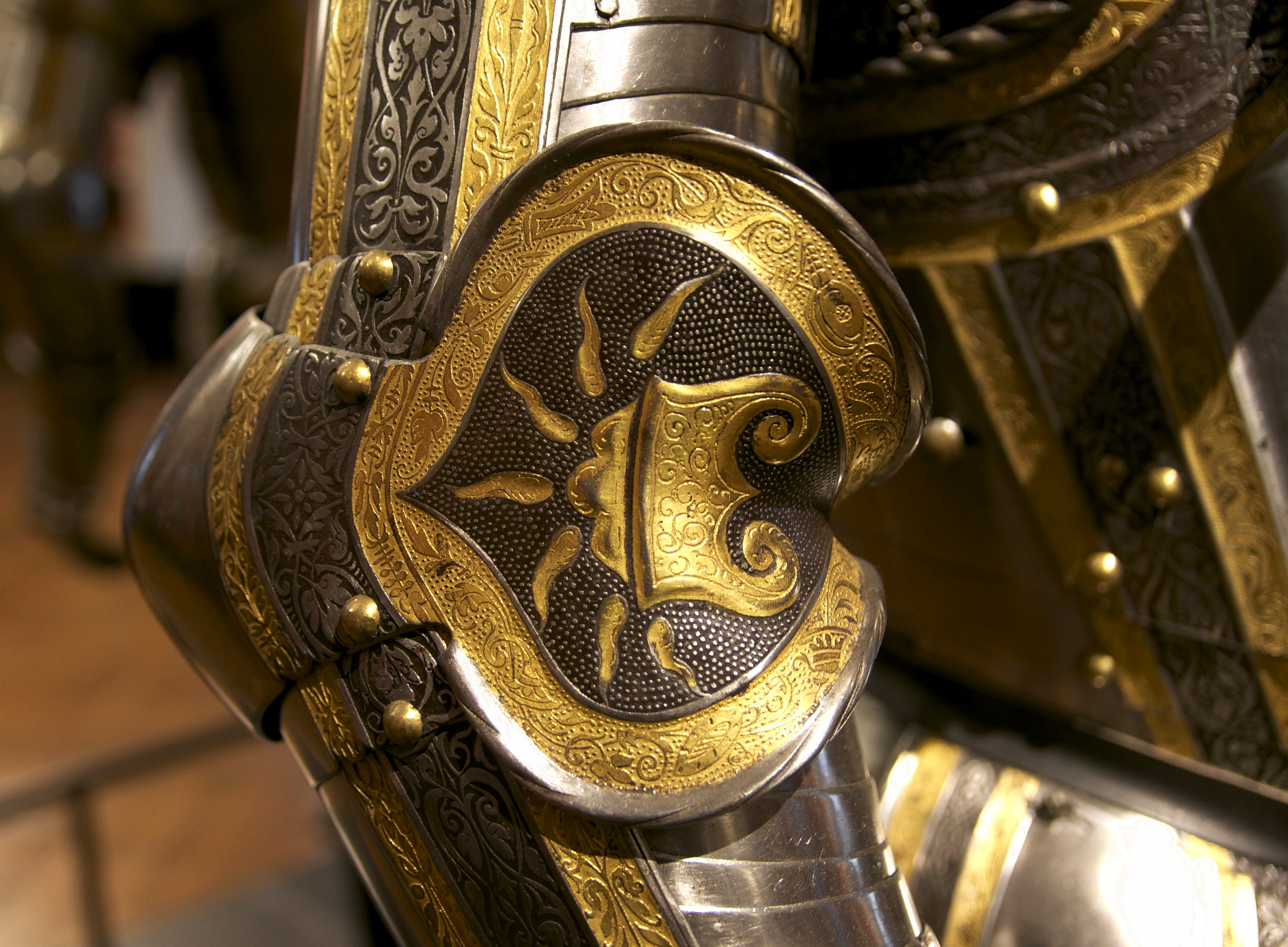
A couter of an Austrian imperial armour, Kunsthistorisches Museum, Vienna, Austria

The couter (also spelled "cowter") is the defense for the elbow in a piece of plate armour. Initially just a curved piece of metal, as plate armor progressed the couter became an articulated joint. Couters were popular by the 1320s.

In fighting reenactment groups such as the Society for Creative Anachronism, a couter/cowter is often called an elbow cop.

== See also ==
- Poleyn
