= List of medieval armour components =

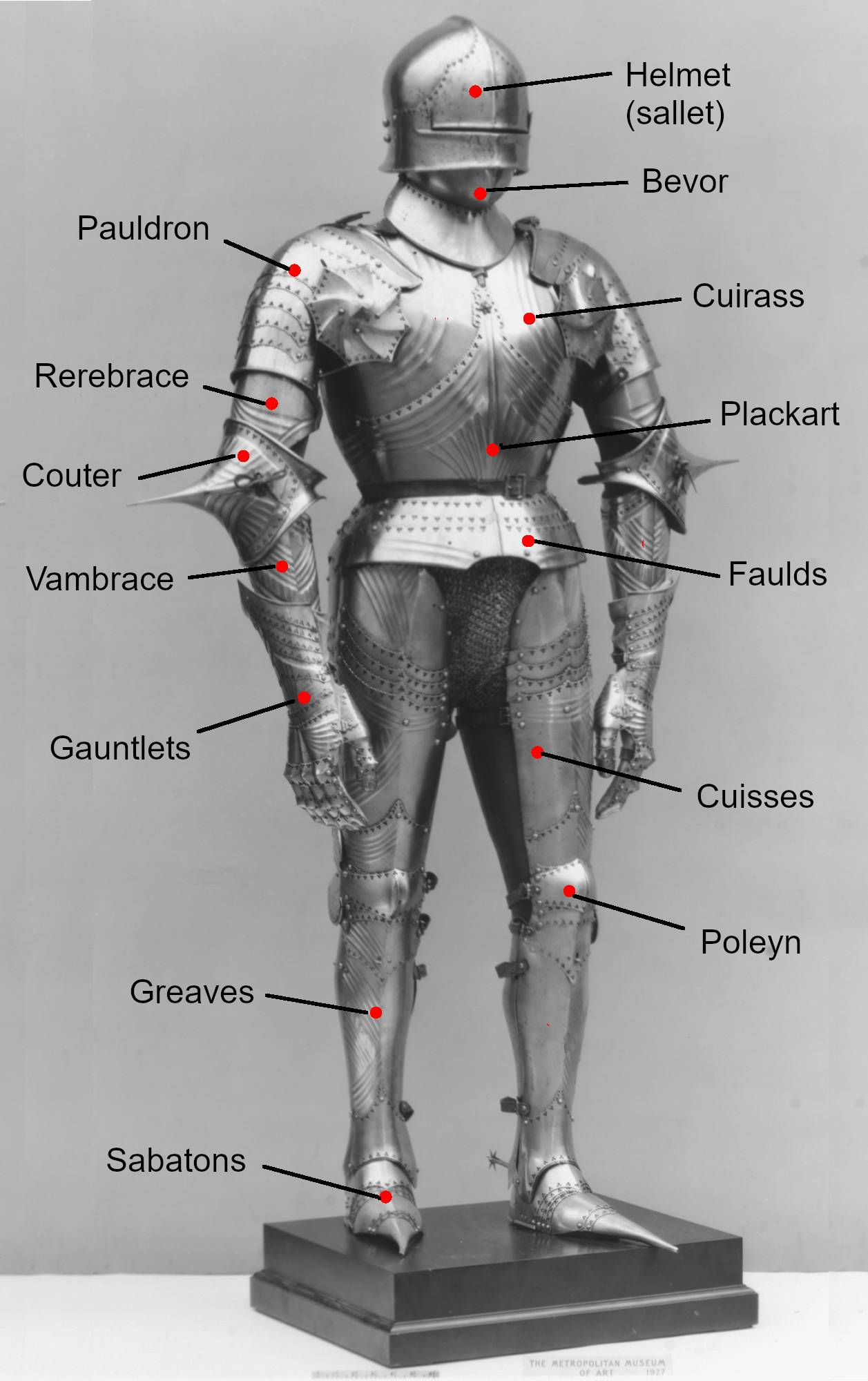
Late medieval gothic plate armour with list of elements. The slot in the helmet is called an occularium.

This list identifies various pieces of body armour worn both by men and horses from the medieval to early modern period in the Western world, mostly plate but some mail armour, arranged by the part of body that is protected and roughly by date. It does not identify fastening components or various appendages such as lance rests or plumeholders, or clothing such as tabards or surcoats, which were often worn over a joey.

There are a variety of alternative names and spellings (such as cowter or couter; bassinet, bascinet or basinet; and besagew or besague) which often reflect a word introduced from French. Generally, the English spelling has been preferred (including mail instead of the lately used maille or the inauthentic term chainmail). The part of armour on the hand is called the gauntlet, which is based on a French word.

== List ==
Summary comparison of components of medieval European harness
Name	Example	Period (century)	Description
Head
Mail coif		400BC? to 15th	Mail hood, often worn with a hauberk. Sometimes made integrally with the hauberk, sometimes a separate piece.
Spangenhelm		4th to 11th	Made from three pieces: two skulls riveted to the helmet. The helmet features a metal browband consisting of four to six—or even more—metal strips (German: Spangen) that converge at a conical curve at the tip of the helmet or a helmet spike.
Nasal helmet		Late 9th to 13th	The nasal helmet most prominently used by the Normans developed from the Viking conical helmet. These helmets were either forged from a single piece of iron or constructed from a number of iron plates. They could be riveted together or attached to a metal band framework. The nose guard was riveted onto the metal band around the bottom rim. The nasal helmet was used until the second half of the 13th century.
Enclosed helmet		Mid 12th to early 13th	Introduced by the mid-12th century, the enclosed or flat-topped helmet first covered the face and gave somewhat deeper coverage for the sides and back of the head. By the end of the century the helm had developed into the great helm.
Great helm		Late 12th to 14th	The great helm, or heaume, evolved from the flat-topped helmet or enclosed helmet at the beginning of the 13th century. This flat-topped helmet was given a face guard featuring two slits for the eyes, known as sights, ventilation holes called breaths, and a neck guard that extended around to join the face guard. The great helm often featured a cruciform metal bracing at the front. It was not until the 1260s that the crown of the helmet was given a tapered shape to better deflect a sword cut. From the end of the 12th century onward, the great helm was adorned with a crest. This was intended to demonstrate the wearer’s martial prowess; it also served to identify him in battle.
Cervelliere		Late 12th	Steel skull cap worn as a helm or underneath a great helm. Sometimes worn under rather than over the coif.
Bascinet		Early 14th to early or mid 15th	In its early form worn underneath a great helm. Originally it had no visor but did develop nasals to protect the nose. By the mid-14th century it replaced the great helm and was fully visored, often "dog-faced" (the conical hounskull visor), but often worn without the visor for improved visibility and ventilation. Worn with an aventail, then later with a gorget. With a conical skull that extended to cover the cheeks and the nape of the neck at the rear and sides, the basinet was of medium height. Towards the end of the 14th century, it was lengthened to cover the base of the neck and cheekbones, while the apex of the skull was gradually positioned further back to form an almost vertical rear face.
Kettle hat		12th to 16th century	The kettle-hat, introduced at the end of the 12th century, was the head protection for the common soldier. It was a dome-shaped metal hat with a wide brim riveted along the lower edge. By the 16th century it had been developed into the morion.
Sallet		Mid-15th	The sallet evolved from various forms of the fourteenth-century basinet. Originating in Italy around 1407 as the celata, it was introduced in France and Burgundy by 1420 and reached England and Western Europe in the 1430s. Early Italian celatas typically had no visors, while those later adopted in Western Europe featured short tails and deep, rounded bowls. At first, the visor barely covered the nose, with the tail extending to the shoulders. By 1450, the design was refined: the bowl's depth matched that of the visor, shaped to fit the head and neck, with a medium-length tail and a prominent keel-shaped ridge. It could either have a half visor with a cusped brow reinforce or a full visor for skull coverage. The German variant of the sallet, rarely used before 1460, was larger and deeper, with a downward-sloping tail. It fell into two groups: one included a small half visor for visibility, while the other was a single piece featuring slits for the eyes.
Barbute		15th	Also called barbuta, a style of sallet with a characteristic Y- or T-shaped slit for vision and breathing, reminiscent of ancient Greek helmets. Used predominantly in Italy.
Armet		15th	Developed in Italy in the first half of the 13th century, derived from the basinet; consisted of a one-piece hemispherical skull. Truncated at the level of the tops of the ears except at the rear, where there was a narrow tail of steel shaped to the head extending as far as the hairline. The armet can be divided into two types: the Italian and the English. The main difference lies in the construction of the headpiece. The Italian armet features cheek plates that open outward, while the English variant has a more pronounced headpiece that protects the neck and ears. The English variant does not have the weak points found in the Italian model at the junction between the cheek and neck guards, and generally lacks the rondel, a disc that provides additional protection in the Italian model.
Close helmet or close helm		15th to 16th century	The direct successor to the armet. The round opening at the back of the armet was replaced by a plate guard. The back of the closed helmet featured a hollow rim, which was usually adorned with straps and fitted over a corresponding solid rim at the top of the neck collar, allowing the head to be turned from side to side. In early helmets, the visor and the bavière were one-piece and very often designed in a bellows pattern; later examples, however, show them as two separate parts, with the actual visor able to be folded down into the bavière.
Burgonet		Early 16th century	Developed in response to the increasing use of firearms. The goal was to create a lighter form of head protection that would guarantee soldiers maximum mobility and an unrestricted view of the battlefield compared to older, heavier helmet types. The burgonet evolved from the schaller and the kettle hat. Its shape was influenced by ancient Greek and Roman models, which had regained popularity during the Renaissance. The burgonet was first introduced in Italy between 1510 and 1530. The helmet remained in active use throughout the 16th century and did not disappear until the general abandonment of armour at the end of the 17th century. The burgonet was an open helmet. It was closely fitted to the shape of the head and featured a pronounced crest, neck protection, and movable cheek flaps. It could also be supplemented with a nose guard or a detachable face guard (buffe).
Neck
Aventail or camail			A fan-shaped curtain of mail extending from the base of the basinet to the tip of the shoulder, protecting the neck and throat but leaving the face exposed. Initially riveted directly to the basinet, it was later fastened using staples known as vervelles that went through a leather band at the upper edge of the mail. A rope was then inserted through the staples above the leather. Taking advantage of being removable the aventail could easily repaired and cleaned.
Bevor		13th to 15th	The bevor protecting the chin and throat first appeared at the end of the 13th century. Originally and still until well into the 15th century it was worn in combination with the kettle hat. Until the appearance of the sallet, it was also worn over the aventail. Their most prominent use was in combination with the sallet, especially in northwest Europe. These plates, especially in Germany, were invariably pointed and extended over the top of the breastplate. Bevors could also fitted with a pivoted lame which could be raised or lowered to uncover or cover the lower face. The bevor was secured by a strap which passed round the back of the wearer's neck, and fastened either at centre back or at either side of the bevor.
Gorget			The gorget, protecting the neck, first appeared in the first half of the 14th century in the form of scales. Later, it was made of plate.Originally, it was worn under a camail, but by the end of the century the camail had fallen out of use, and from then on the gorget was worn on its own.
Standard, pixane, or bishop's mantle		15th century	The mail standard or haussecol protecting the neck emerged in the second half of the 15th century. It mostly was worn like a small tippet with a reinforced stiff collar around the neck, that was edged with brass links riveted with iron. The fullness in the mail that extends over the shoulder was obtained by gusseting, the lower edge of the mail being made into four escallops like one half of a hexagon with concave sides. The ends of the collar were either strapped together at the back or fastened by a hinge with a movable pin. By the end of the century a special mail standard was developed in Austria–Hungary and Venice called bishop's mantles, which reached well over the shoulders.
Falling buffe		16th century	Evolved from the bevor and was composed of several lames, retained in place by spring catches, which could be lowered for better ventilation and vision. It was often attached to the otherwise open-faced helmet, the burgonet.
Torso
Brigandine		late 12th to 16th century	Dating back to the 15th century, the brigandine was made from silk covered with riveting rectangular overlapping iron lames or scales. These rivets formed decorative patterns and were arranged either in horizontal lines or, more commonly, in groups of three. There were several types of brigandines depending of purpose varying from the standard of small-plates and larger chest-plates to half-suit brigandines. Most variants had distinct sleeves covered in crimson, blue satin, or cloth of gold.
Hauberk, byrnie, or haubergeon		? to 15th (mostly died out during the 14th and 15th centuries)	The main type of body armour from the 11th century up to the 1320s was the knee-length mail shirt, known as a birnie or hauberk. Early hauberks were made exclusively of riveted rings and likely weighed about 14 kg. Hauberks were pulled over the head and were slit at the front and back to allow the wearer to ride. The sleeves typically reached the mid-forearm, with the wrists covered by an underlying fabric or leather cuff. To protect the vulnerable throat, many 11th-century hauberks featured a reinforced, rectangular chest panel trimmed with colored bands. Alternatively, the collar was extended into an integral coif. While the chin-slit could simply be laced shut, it was more common to draw a padded mail flap the ventail across the lower face, securing it at the temple with either laces, straps, or hooks. Beneath this mail, knights wore a quilted cap tied under the chin. Although separate coifs emerged around 1275, integral coifs remained the predominant variant for the remainder of the century.
Cuirass		14th to 17th	The cuirass, derived from the French word for leather (cuir), evolved from the earliest plate armour of the 12th century. Initially, the plastron (the breastplate) was worn under the mail, but later it was worn over the mail and under the surcoat. By the early 13th century, this basic chest piece had been replaced by the cuirie, a breastplate made of cuirbouilli. The armour was soon expanded to include a back plate, with the two sections joined together at the shoulders and waist. The back and breast plates were attached either by hinges or by straps and buckles.
Plackart		15th century	The plackart an extra layer of plate armour was emerged around 1420. Initially only covering the belly and attached at the breastplate with a single strap and buckle, by the end of the century it covered the whole breastplate.
Grand guard			Additional plate, worn in jousting to protect the chest and shoulders.
Faulds		14th century to 17th century	The fauld or tonlet, first emerging in 1370, were horizontal overlapping lames of metal attached to the breastplates. These lames riveted to a leather skirt protected the abdomen and the buttocks of the wearer. Around 1425 the lowest lame was formed into an arch, which by 1430 were cut in half forming some kind of tassets. These were attached to the verge of the fauld with straps and buckles.
Culet		1430 to ?	Small, horizontal lames that protect the small of the back or the buttocks, attached to a backplate or cuirass. First appeared in 1430 in Italy.
Arm
Couter or cowter		14th	Plate that guards the elbow.
Spaulder			Bands of plate that cover the shoulder and part of upper arm but not the armpit.
Pauldron		15th	Covers the shoulder (with a dome-shaped piece called a shoulder cop), armpit and sometimes the back and chest. The shoulder cop and the elbow cop can also be enlarged so as to overlap other plates and protect joints.
Gardbrace		15th	A reinforcing plate covering the lower part of the pauldron's front. It was attached to the pauldron by a staple and pin.
Rerebrace or brassart or upper cannon (of vambrace)			Plate that covers the section of upper arm from elbow to the area covered by shoulder armour. Eveloped analogously to the vambrace; disappeared around 1450.
Besagew			Circular plate that covers the armpit.
Vambrace or lower cannon (of vambrace)		14th	Plate armour for the lower arm did not emerge until 1330. From then on the vambrace covering the lower arm from the wrist to the elbow was introduced. From the 15th century onwards there were different forms of vambrace constructed. While Italian-style armourers made larger upper vambrace cannons, in Germany the lower portion was enlarged. German vambraces were also fluted and more decorative than those from Italy. 'Vambrace' may also sometimes refer to parts of armour that together cover the lower and upper arms.
Gauntlet			By the 12th century the sleeves of the hauberk grew longer until, towards its end, they extended to form a covering for the hand. This covering, which may be considered the first form of hand defence, included the whole hand and fingers in a single pouch, with a separate compartment for the thumb, to facilitate the grasping of a weapon. In the 13th century in France the gagnepain, a leather glove covered with small iron plates, appeared. In the early 14th century, the gauntlet began to evolve ahead of body armour, maintaining a relatively consistent design for the following century. This design featured a distinctive construction where the cuff and metacarpal guard flared from the wrist, resembling an hourglass shape, with a broad metal plate protecting the hand from wrist to knuckles. By the mid-15th century, the mitten gauntlet appeared, characterized by a single-piece main plate that conformed to the thumb's base and had a slight bend along the knuckles, sometimes including articulation. As time progressed, left and right gauntlets took on differing forms. At the beginning of the 16th century, a special jousting gauntlet was introduced; its cuff could be locked to prevent the lance or sword from slipping out of the hand.
Guard of vambrace			An additional layer of armour that goes over cowter, in which case it is proper to speak of the lower cannon of the vambrace which is the forearm guard, and the upper cannon of vambrace which is the rerebrace.
Leg
Chausses		12th to mid 14th	Chausses or mail hosen were leggings for protection of the legs. Although there are some early examples in the 11th century, they were in common use by the middle of the twelfth century. They were either laced up at the back of the calf or gartered at the knee, and often with spurs attached to the heel by straps. Chausses were used well in to the 14th century.
Poleyn		13th	The poleyn first appeared about 1225, fastened above and below the knee over the mail hose. By 1250–1260, a triangular extension was added to protect the outside of the knee joint, alongside a narrow plate extending down the front of the shin. These defences were secured with straps at the knee and mid-calf. During the period 1300–1330, the outer extension of the poleyn was enlarged into a fan shape, and the knee-defence was riveted directly to the greave, with a deep plate below the poleyn overlapping the top of the shin protection.
Schynbald		13th to 15th	Schynbalds or jamber were small plate shin armour worn over the chausses.
Greave			Greaves were plate defences for the lower leg from knee to ankle. Initially covering only the front, from 1310 onwards it protected the whole lower leg.
Cuisses			Introduced in the early 13th century, they were at first made of quilted and padded tubes of cloth. By 1370 they were constructed of a single metal plate.
Sabaton or solleret			Sabatons first appeared between 1310 and 1320. They were made of overlapping plates. They were either fixed to the bottom of the greaves or made as a separate shoe. Later on they covered all but the heel and could also fitted with spurs.
Tasset or tuille			Covering the space between the fauld and the leg harness, the tassets were introduced around 1420. They were hung onto the fauld with straps and buckles and over time developed rectangular and then triangular forms. When by 1450 the tassets were overlapping the top of the cuisses, additional smaller tassets were added to them.
Various
Gousset		14th	Mail that protects areas not covered by plate, such as armpits.
Ailette		1275 to 1350	Aillettes, first appearing in the 1275s, were small plates made from boiled leather or metal attached to the top of the shoulder plates at a 90° angle. Most often these were rectangular, although other shapes are also known, and all were decorated with heraldic symbols. After 1350 they disappeared.
Rondel			Any circular plate. Rondels protecting various areas may have particular names, such as a besagew protecting the shoulder joint.
Codpiece			The codpiece was a flap or pouch to protect the groin. In the 16th century it was often of exaggerated size, in line with the fashion of the time.
Horse
Shaffron		12th century	The shaffron or chanfron, protecting the horse's head, was introduced around 1250. Initially made out of leather, by the end of the century it could be made of iron or steel. By the mid-14th century it often had a sharp spike at the forehead or a prominent medial rip. It could either enclose the whole head or just cover the forehead with the nose and the cheeks. Both forms were equipped with eye holes with the larger type protected by flanges or pierced bosses. By 1350 they also had ear protection.
Crinet		14th	A series of articulated metal plates (lames) that guarded the upper part of the horse's neck and mane.
Peytral			An iron or cuir bouilli breastplate that protected the chest of the horse.
Flanchard		mid 15th	Long, horizontal side plates that protected the horse's flanks between the peytral and the croupier.
Croupier			Armour covering the hindquarters (buttocks and thighs) of the horse, consisting of large, oblong plates riveted together.
Mail trapper		13th century	A mail trapper was a trapper, or caparison, of mail, used in a similar manner to a hauberk, to protect the torso of the horse. It was introduced in the 13th century, often with a cloth caparison over it to hide the armour.

== See also ==
- Armored combat (sport)
- SCA armoured combat

== Bibliography ==
- Ashdown, Charles Henry (1988). An illustrated History of Arms & Armour. Hertfordshire: Wordsworth Editions. ISBN 1-85326-914-X.
- Blair, Claude (1958). European Armor circa 1066 to circa 1700. London: B.T. Batsford.
- Wise, Terence (1976). Medieval Warfare. New York: Hastings House.
- Morrison, Sean (1963). Armor. New York: Thomas Y. Crowell Company. ISBN 0-690-09970-3.
- Hewitt, John (1855). The Fourteenth Century. Ancient Armour and Weapons in Europe: from the Iron Period of the Northern Nations to the End of the Thirteenth Century. Vol. II. Oxford: John Henry & James Parker.
- Edge, David (1996). Arms and Armour of the Medieval Knight: an illustrated History of Weaponry in the Middle Ages. London: Saturn Books. ISBN 1-86222-001-8.
- Boeheim, Wendelin (1890). Handbuch der Waffenkunde: das Waffenwesen in seiner historischen Entwickelung vom Beginn des Mittelalters bis zum Ende des 18. Jahrhunderts. Leipzig: E.A. Seemann.
- Gravett, Christopher (2002). English Medieval Knight 1200-1300. Oxford: Osprey. ISBN 1-84176-144-3.
- Laking, Francis Guy (1920a). A Record of European Armour and Arms through Seven Centuries. Vol. I. London: Bell and Sons.
- Laking, Francis Guy (1920b). A Record of European Armour and Arms through Seven Centuries. Vol. II. London: Bell and Sons.
- Laking, Francis Guy (1921). A Record of European Armour and Arms through Seven Centuries. Vol. IV. London: Bell and Sons.
- DeVries, Kelly (1992). Medieval Military Technology. Peterborough, Ont.: Broadview Press.
- Oakeshott, R. Ewart (1962). A knight and his Armour. Philadelphia: Dufour Editions. OCLC 1035937741.
- Pyhrr, Stuart W.; LaRocca, Donald J.; Breiding, Dirk H. (2005). Metropolitan Museum of Art (ed.). The Armored Horse in Europe, 1480-1620. New Heaven: Yale University Press. ISBN 0-300-10764-1.
- Stone, George Cameron (13 March 2013). A Glossary of the Construction, Decoration and Use of Arms and Armor: in All Countries and in All Times. Courier Corporation. ISBN 978-0-486-13129-0.
- Lowe, Eric (30 November 2020). The Use of Medieval Weaponry. Aeon Books. ISBN 978-1-913504-25-0.
- Absolon, Trevor (30 November 2017). Samurai Armour: Volume I: The Japanese Cuirass. Bloomsbury Publishing. ISBN 978-1-4728-2224-6.
- Wilkinson, Frederic (1970). Battle Dress: a Gallery of Military Style and Ornament. Garden City: Doubleday & Company.
