= Cheekpiece =

Cheekpiece, cheek-piece, or cheek piece may refer to

- A raised area on a rifle stock to support the cheek
- A part of a bit for horses, e.g. the bit shank
- A part of body armor such as the armet
