= Burgonet =

Type of light open helmet

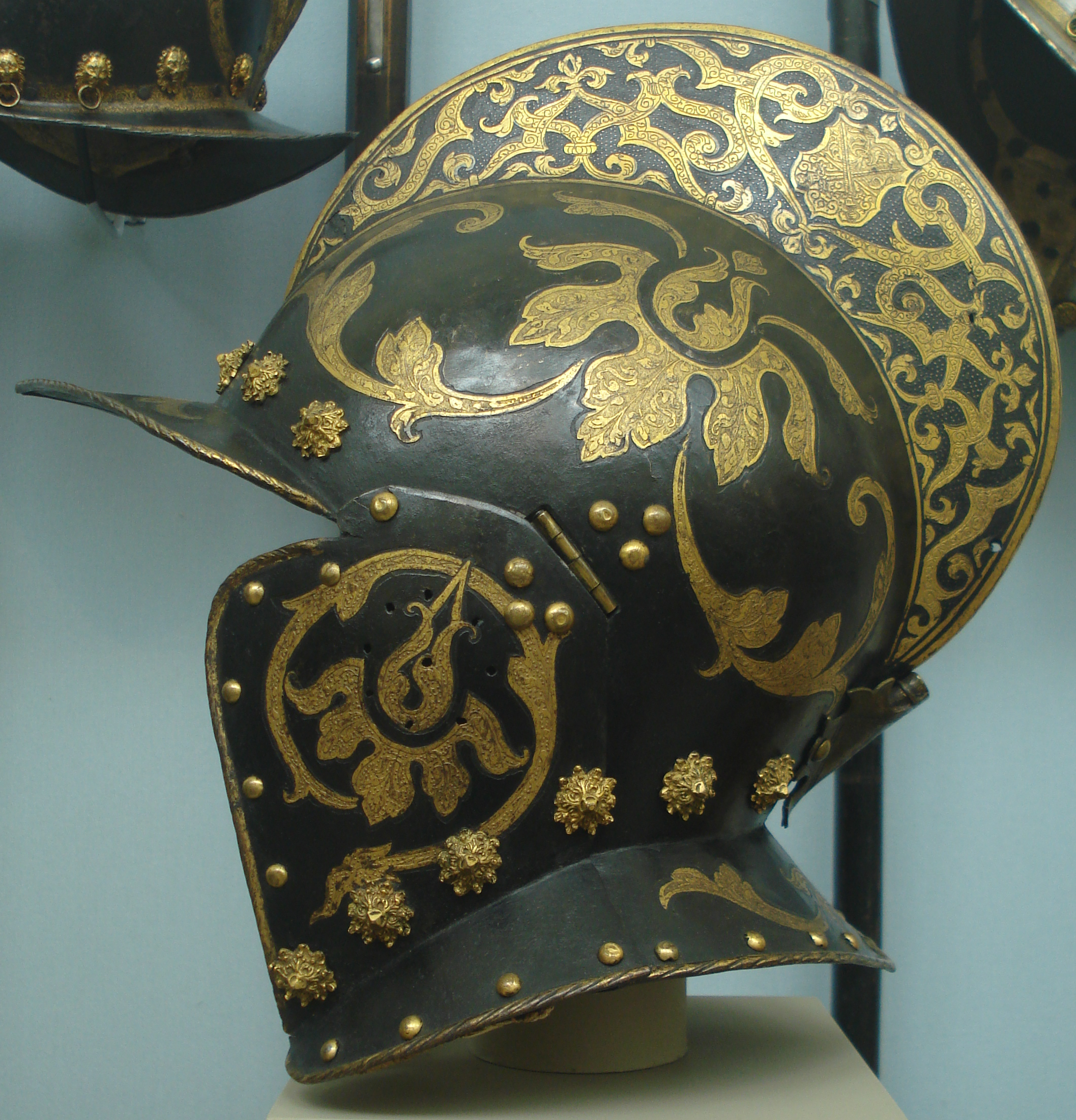
German burgonet of classic form, 16th century

The burgonet helmet (sometimes called a burgundian sallet) was a Renaissance-era and early modern combat helmet. It was the successor of the sallet.

== Characteristics ==
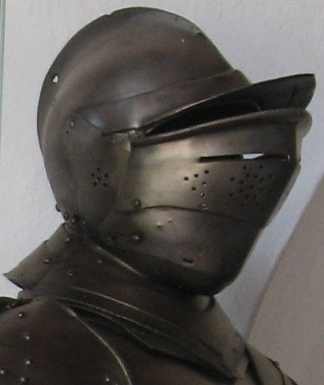
Intermediate helmet ("close burgonet") with the peak, crest and falling buffe of the burgonet, combined with the hinged bevor of a close helmet.

The burgonet helmet is characterised by a skull with a large fixed or hinged peak projecting above the face-opening, and usually an integral, keel-like, crest or comb running from front to rear. Attached to the skull are substantial hinged cheekpieces which usually do not meet at the chin or throat. A flange projects from the lower parts of the skull and cheekpieces to protect the back and sides of the neck. Though typically a relatively light helmet and open faced, a falling buffe, a sort of visor that was closed by being drawn up rather than down, was sometimes used. Some helmets, often termed "close burgonets", were made which took elements, such as the peak, crest and falling buffe, of the burgonet and combined them with the hinged bevor of the close helmet.

== Use ==
Commonplace throughout Europe, it first came into use early in the 16th century and had attained its classic form by c. 1550. Accompanied by plate armour, burgonets were mostly worn by cavalry, such as demi-lancers and cuirassiers.

The Border Reivers, of the English-Scottish borderlands, were very fond of burgonets and the morion in Elizabethan times, and as a result reivers were often called steil (steel) bonnets.

Burgonets were also a popular helmet type among the Polish winged hussars, where they merged with types of lobster-tailed pot helmets (Zischägge), often featuring a nasal bar or facial guard.

The burgonet was common among the mercenary Swiss infantry who were pikemen who could defend themselves against cavalry (perhaps taking helmets of this form as trophies). Following the appearance of the Stahlhelm, Adrian, and Brodie helmets during the First World War, the Swiss experimented with a "streamlined" form of the burgonet for their own national helmet, but both designs were rejected.

The factors of utility of the burgonet over older helmets include:

- Cost—The main factor in the decision to wear one; burgonets were significantly cheaper than closed-face helmets due to having fewer hinges and locking mechanisms required to keep typical close helms closed.
- Encumbrance—Close helmets were slightly heavier, and while mobility was roughly similar, it could be hard for the wearer to see, and breathe freely during combat while wearing one. The burgonet, however, was light and had an open face that gave an advantage in close quarters combat.
- Protection—The burgonet was not as protective as heavier helms, but still protected most of the head. Having an open face could be remedied with a falling buffe.
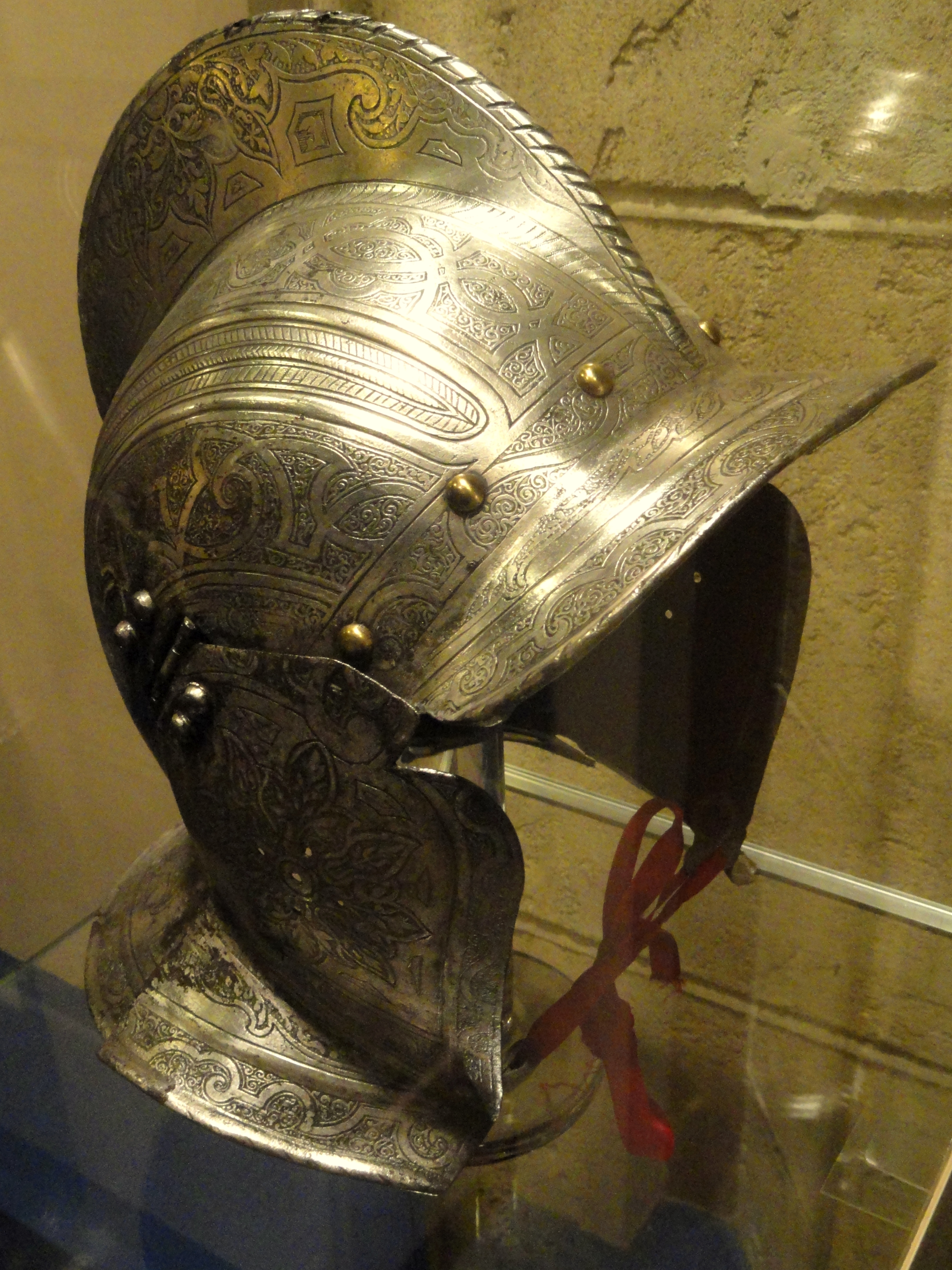
German burgonet, c. 1560, showing the open face of the helmet.

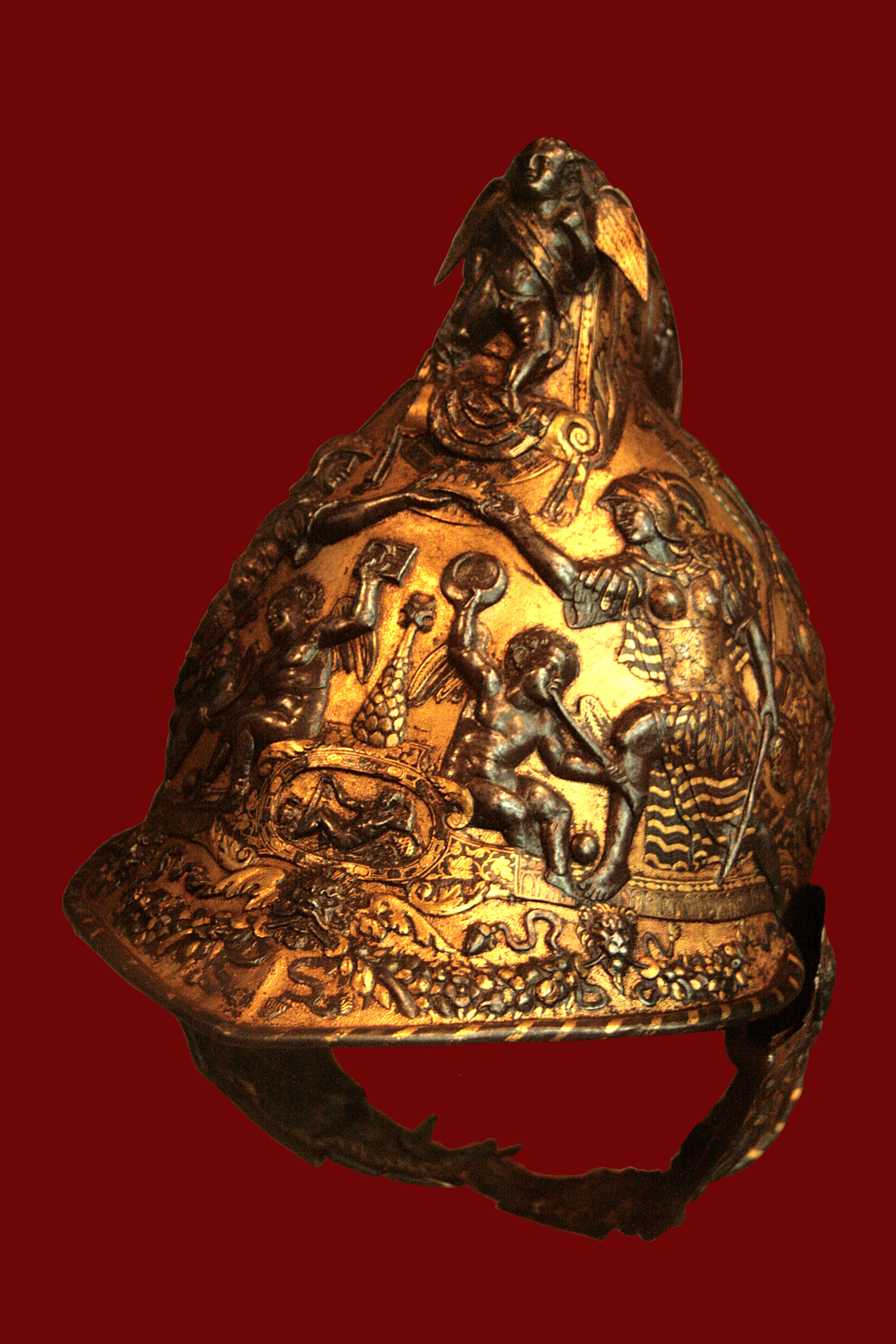
Parade burgonet of Henry II of France, 16th century, Army Museum (Paris).

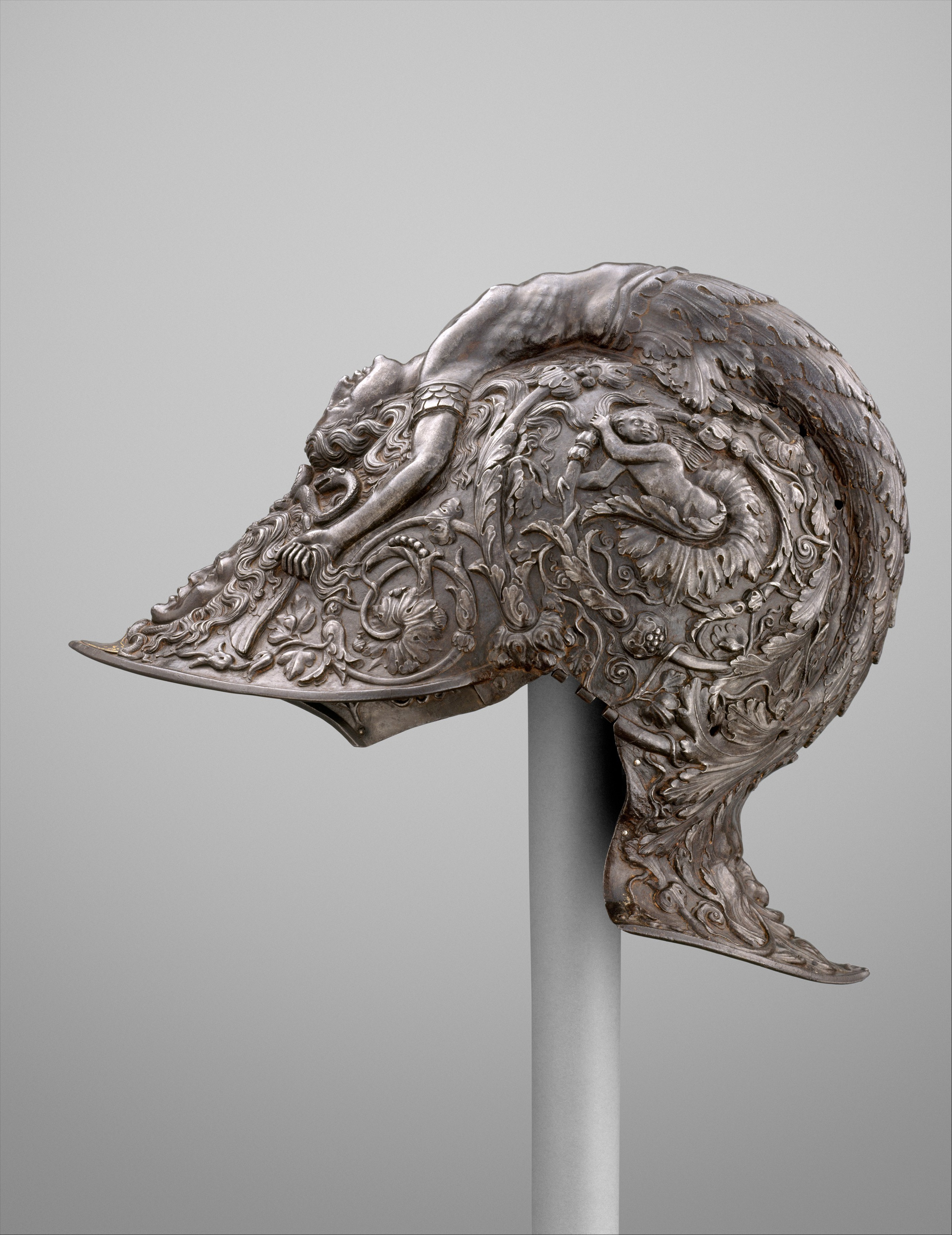
An ornate parade burgonet, workshop of Filippo Negroli, 1543, Metropolitan Museum of Art

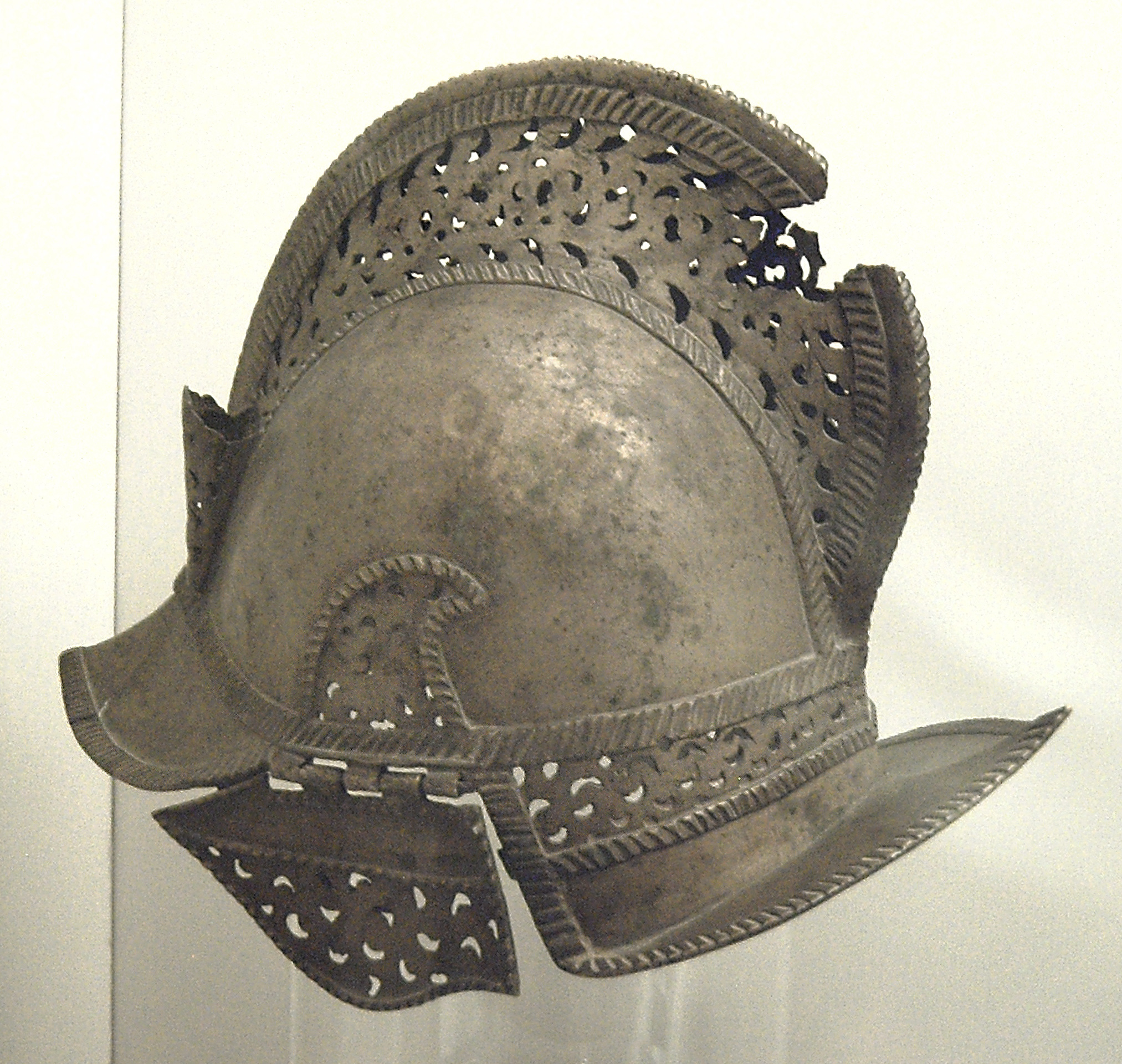
An ornate burgonet with cheek-guards from the Philippine Moros (c. 18th/19th century), Museo de América.

== Bibliography ==
- Blair, Claude (1958), European armour circa 1066 to circa 1700. B.T. Batsford, London.
- Gravett, Christopher (2006) Tudor Kight. Osprey Publishing, London.
- Oakeshott, Ewart (1980) European Weapons and Armour: From the Renaissance to the Industrial Revolution. Lutterworth Press.
