= Demi-lancer =

16th-17th century heavy cavalrymen in Western Europe

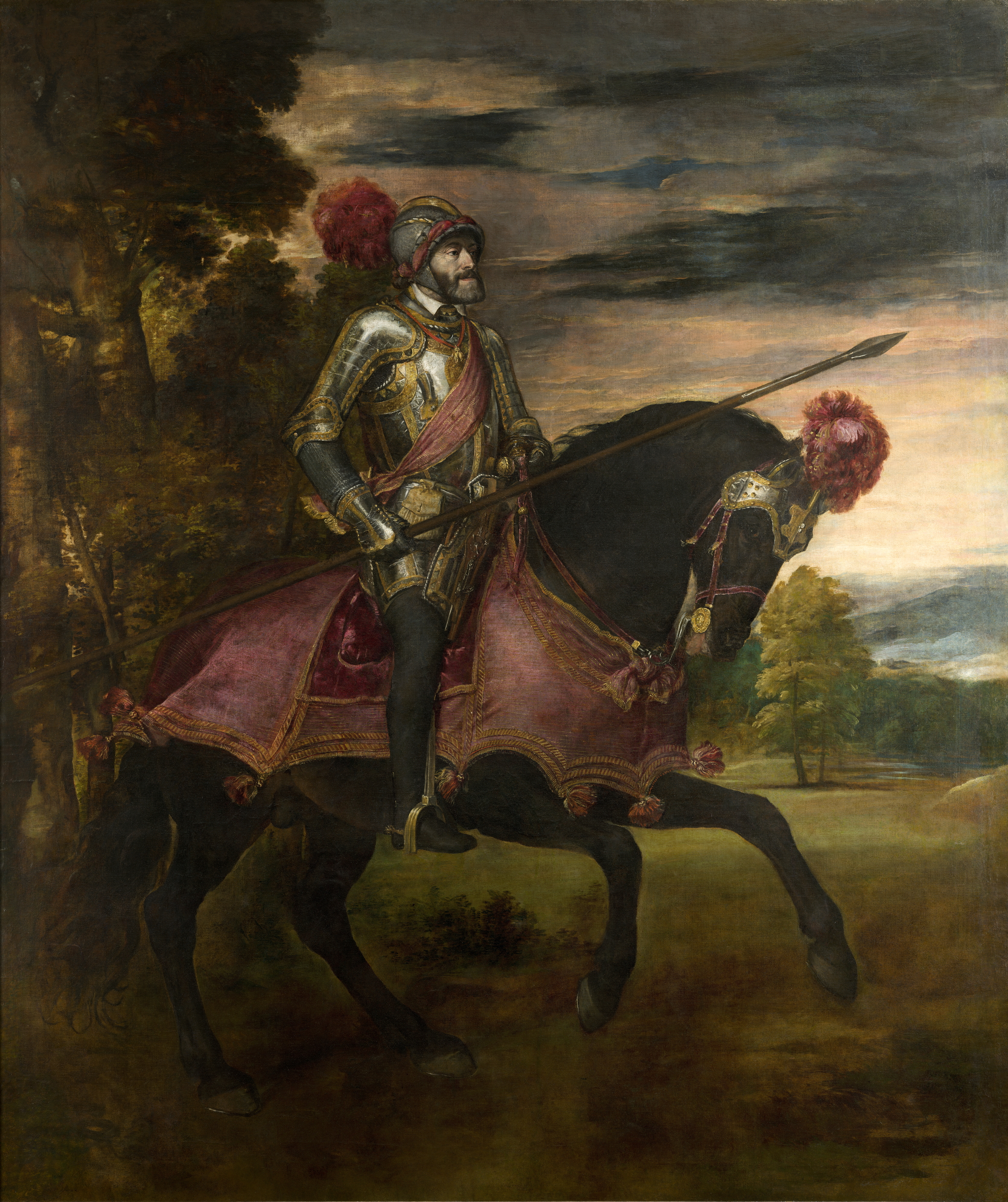
1548 portrait of Emperor Charles V as a demi-lancer by Titian; his lance is of a lighter type than was typical.

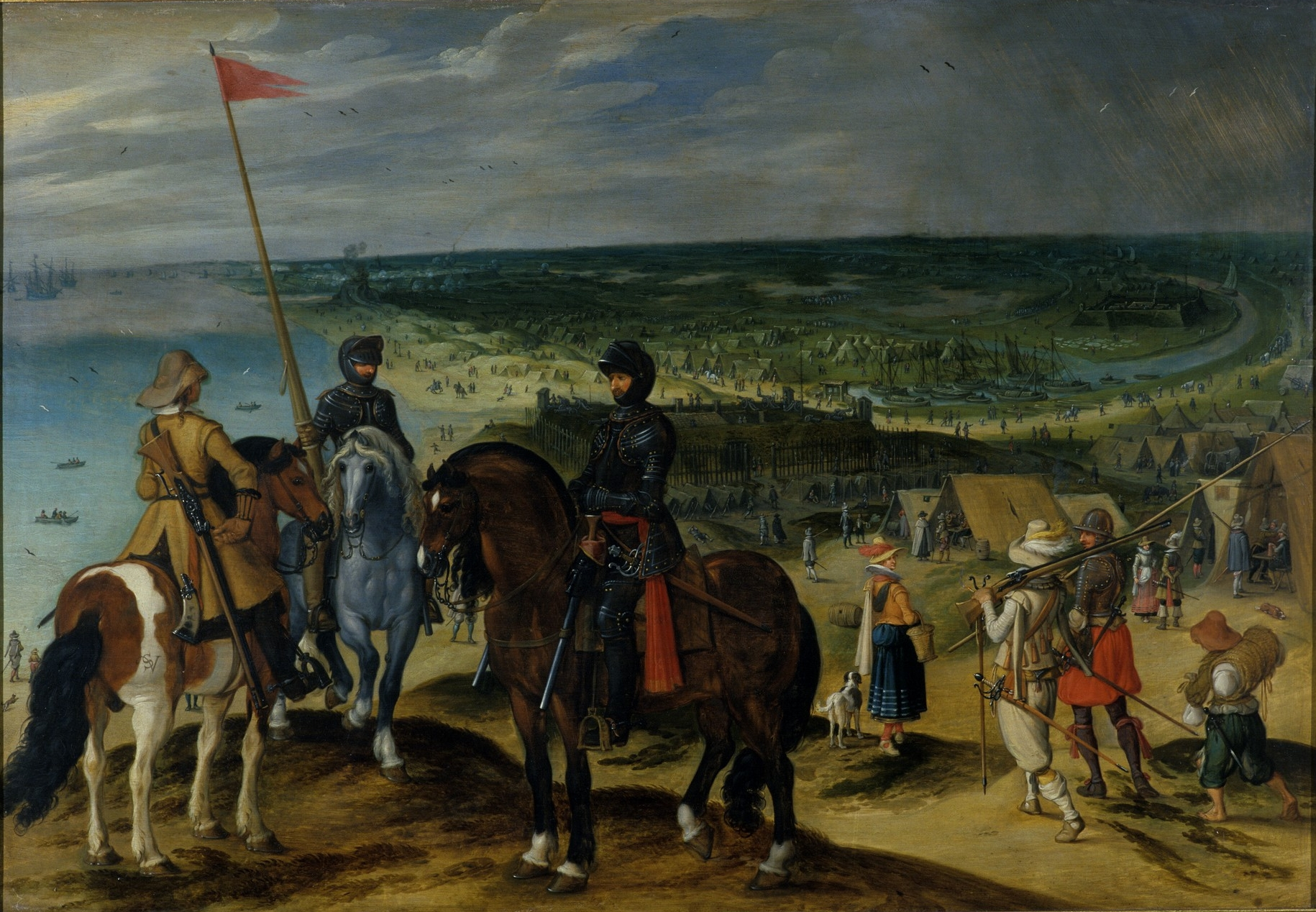
c. 1600–1615 painting of a dragoon, demi-lancer and cuirassier by Sebastiaan Vrancx

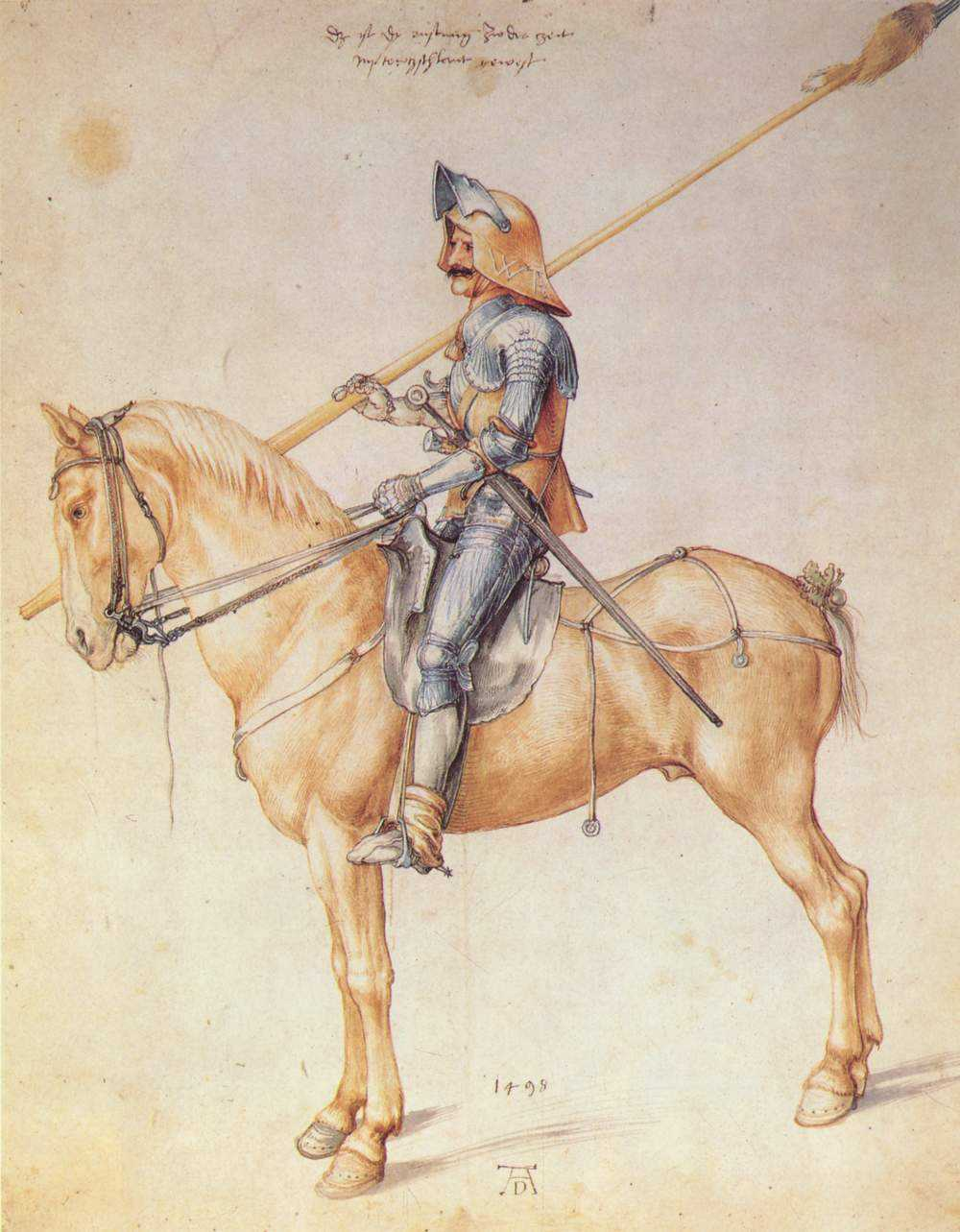
1498 illustration of a German demi-lancer by Albrecht Dürer

The demi-lancer or demilancer was a type of heavy cavalryman in Western Europe during the 16th and early 17th centuries.

== Characteristics ==
"Demi-lancer" was a term used in 16th-century military parlance, especially in England, to designate cavalrymen mounted on unarmoured horses, armed with a slightly lighter version of the heavy lance of a man-at-arms and wearing three-quarter or half-armour, in contrast to the full plate armour of the man-at-arms or gendarme, who rode barded mounts. The cuirass (torso armour) and pauldrons (shoulder protection) of the demi-lancer were intended to be at least pistol proof. An open-faced helmet, such as the burgonet, was often worn in place of the fully-enclosed close helmet. Armour for the leg and foot was replaced by long cuff-topped riding boots. In addition to the lance, the demi-lancer would have been armed with one or two wheellock or snaphance pistols carried in saddle holsters, and a sword (including Walloon swords and rapiers.)

Demi-lancers were representative of the early modern trend of reducing the coverage of armour, while increasing its thickness to provide protection for the vital areas against the projectiles of gunpowder-based firearms of the time, such as the arquebus and, later, the musket. This abbreviated armour was also meant to increase the mobility of the men and horses, as well as reducing the expense of equipping and maintaining them throughout a long campaign. In common with other 16th-century cavalrymen, demi-lancers were frequently used to strike the enemy's flank and to pursue routing troops.

== Recruitment ==
Demi-lancers were prominent in the English troops who fought in the Dutch War of Independence, and were mobilised as part of the defences of England against the invasion threat posed by the Spanish Armada. In all 2,711 demi-lancers were raised in England in 1588, the year of the Armada. The English demi-lancers were raised using the "Trained Band" system, and from the feudal levy on nobles and ecclesiastics.

== Demise ==
The demi-lancer was gradually replaced by similarly armoured cavalry whose primary armament were pistols; these cavalrymen were variously called pistoleers, cuirassiers, or Reiters. In addition, harquebusiers - cavalry with lighter armour using longer firearms, such as doglock carbines - began to appear on the battlefield. The trend towards the loss of the lance began in Germany in the mid-16th century; France had largely abandoned the lance by 1580, and England by 1600. The use of the heavy lance was still mentioned in military treatises up to the mid-17th century, but its actual use had died out well before that time.

The Battle of Coutras (20 October 1587) between the forces of Henry of Navarre and the Royalist force commanded by the Duc de Joyeuse during the French Wars of Religion illustrated the demise of the heavy lancer. Navarre's cavalry comprised 1,300 armoured pistoleers whilst the Royalists deployed 2,000 gendarmes. Within a few minutes of combat the Royalist lancers were routed, many being captured and held for ransom. Only the Polish hussars continued to use a heavier type lance up to the late 18th century. The use of the lance required great skill and constant practice, whereas the use of pistols in battle was far less demanding. This is probably one factor behind the disappearance of the armoured lancer in Western Europe, another being the widespread adoption of the infantry pike. Lighter lances continued in use, especially in Poland, Russia and the Balkans, until their renaissance in the Napoleonic period.

== See also ==
- Lancer
