= Falling buffe =

Armour for the throat and lower face

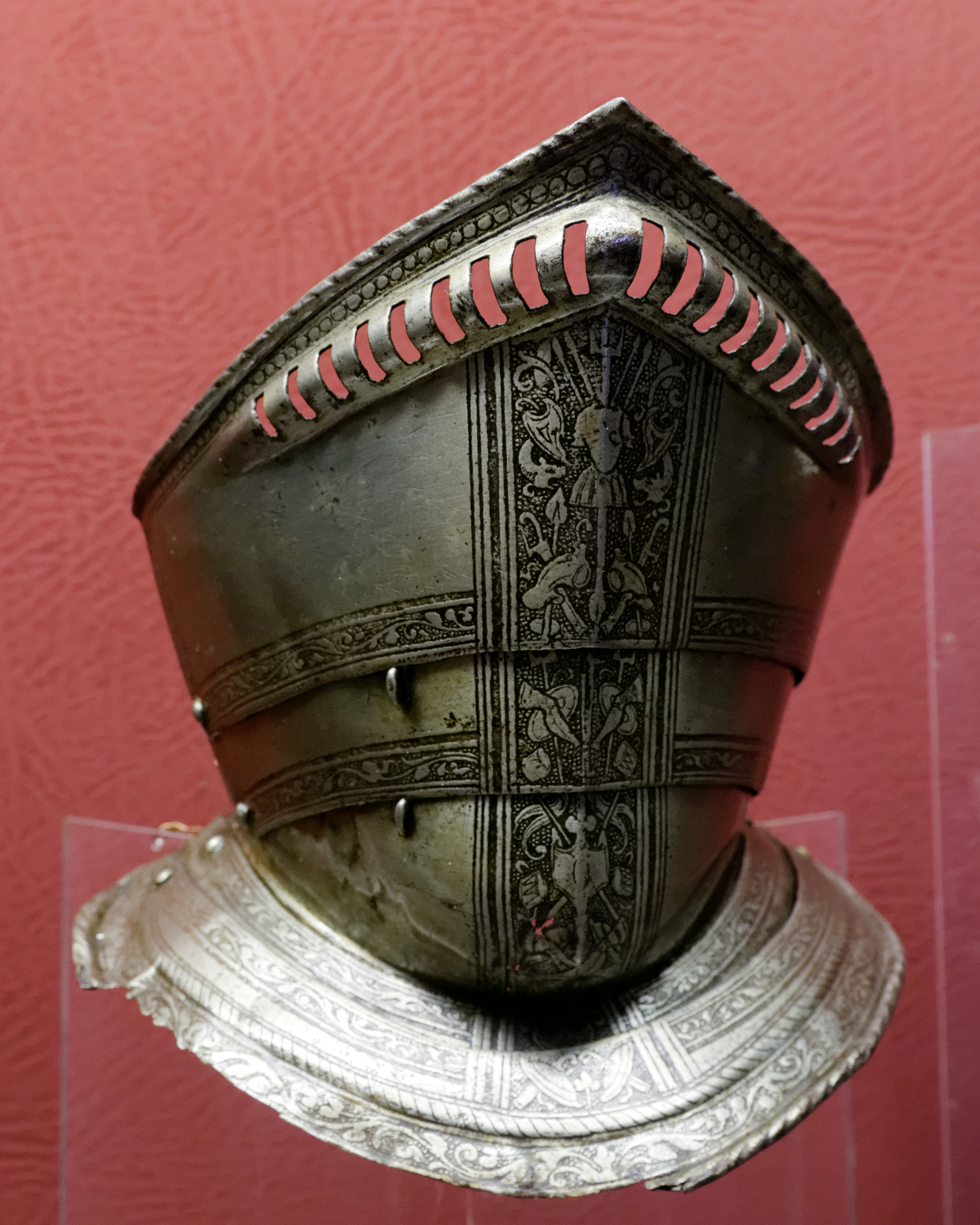
Falling buffe

The falling buffe is 16th century armour for the throat and lower face. It evolved from the bevor and was composed of several lames, retained in place by spring catches, which could be lowered for better ventilation and vision. It was often attached to the otherwise open-faced helmet, the burgonet.
