= Bevor =

Plate armour for the neck and chin

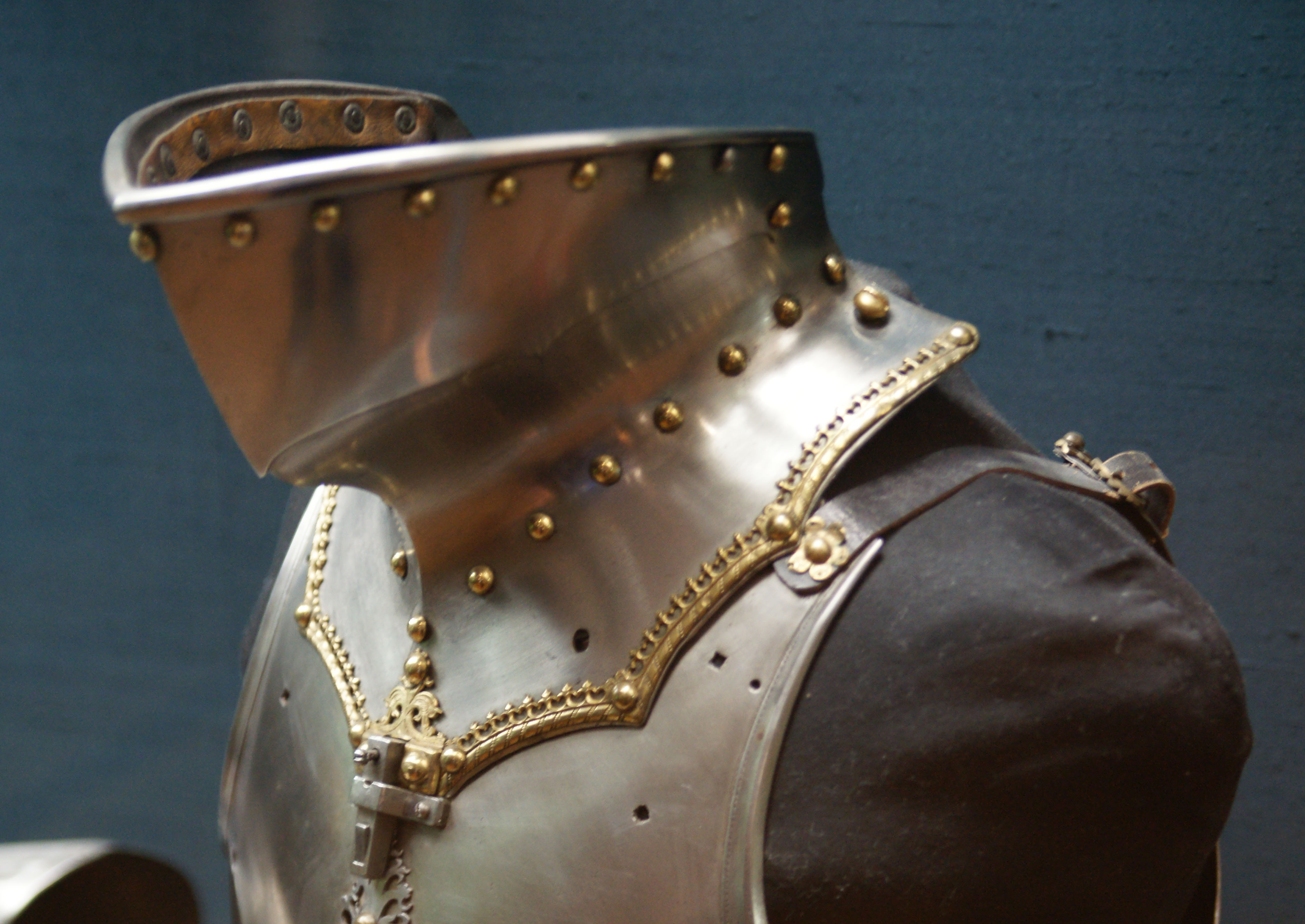
Armour of Maximilian I with bevor (c. 1485)

A bevor (/ˈbiːvər/ BEE-vər) or beaver is a piece of plate armour designed to protect the neck, much like a gorget.

== Etymology ==
The word “bevor” or “beaver” is derived from Old French baver, meaning ‘to dribble’. This is a reference to the effect on the wearer of the armour during battle.

== Description ==
The bevor was a component of a medieval suit of armour. It was usually a single piece of plate armour protecting the chin and throat and filling the gap between the helmet and breastplate. The bevor could also extend over the knight’s left shoulder doubling the thickness of the armour.

The bevor was originally worn in conjunction with a type of helmet known as a sallet. With the close helm and burgonet, developments of the sallet in the late medieval and Renaissance period, the bevor became a hinged plate protecting the lower face and throat. In the 16th century, the bevor developed into the falling buffe. This was a composite piece made up of several lames protecting the lower face and throat, but which could be raised or lowered as the lames were articulated.
