= Sallet =

Combat helmet in widespread use c.1450–1530

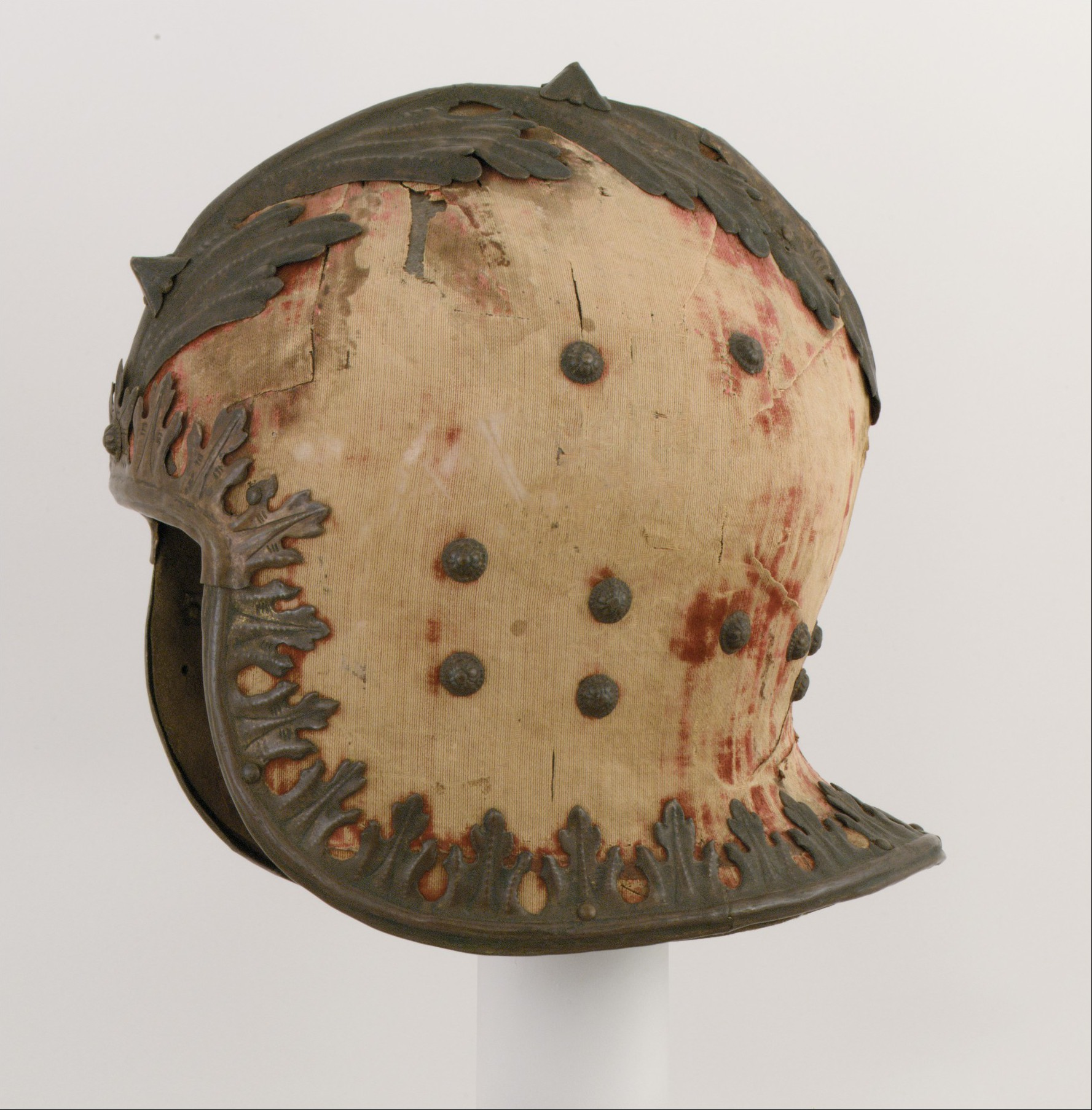
Light Italian celata (sallet) c. 1460, covered with velvet and decorated with repoussé gilt copper edging and crest

The sallet (also called celata, salade and schaller) was a combat helmet that replaced the bascinet in Italy, western and northern Europe and Hungary during the mid-15th century. In Italy, France and England the armet helmet was also popular, but in Germany the sallet became almost universal.

== Origins ==
The origin of the sallet appears to have been in Italy, where the term celata is first recorded in an inventory of the arms and armour of the Gonzaga family dated to 1407. In essence, the earliest sallets were a variant of the bascinet, intended to be worn without an aventail or visor. To protect the face and neck, left exposed by abandonment of the visor and aventail, the rear was curved out into a flange to protect the neck, and the sides of the helmet were drawn forward below the level of the eyes to protect the cheeks. The latter development was most pronounced in the barbute or barbuta, a variation of the sallet that adopted elements of Classical Corinthian helmets.

== Later developments and regional variations ==
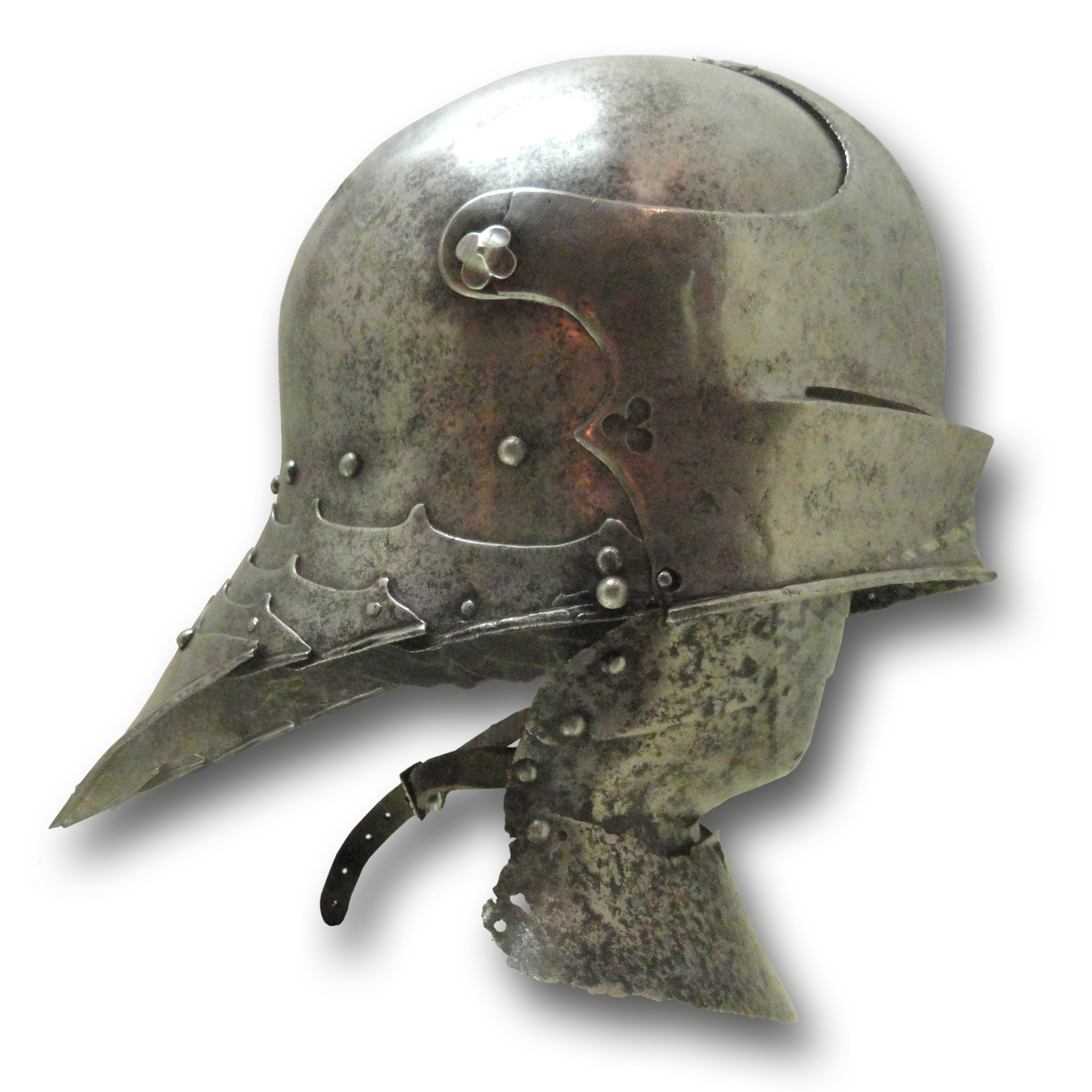
A German sallet with bevor, c. 1480–1490

The sallet became popular in France, England and the Netherlands through contact with Italy and eventually was adopted in Germany. Regional styles developed, which were catered for by the great armour manufacturing centres of northern Italy (especially Milan) and southern Germany (Augsburg and Nuremberg). However, though a sallet, or complete armour, might be German in style, it could have been of Italian manufacture, or vice versa. The German sallet may have been the product of the melding of influences from the Italian sallet and the deep-skulled "German war-hat", a type of brimmed chapel de fer (lit. 'iron hat').

Later Italian sallets (by c. 1460) lost their integral face protection and became open-faced helmets with gracefully curved surfaces. In this simple state they were favoured by more lightly armed troops, especially archers and crossbowmen, whose uninterrupted vision was at a premium. For more heavily armoured troops, a greater level of protection could be afforded by the attachment of a plate reinforcer for the brow of the helmet and a deep visor, usually of the 'bellows' form which incorporated many ventilation slits. Such helmets would have been worn with a stiffened mail collar, termed a "standard", which protected the throat and neck. Some Italian-style sallets were provided with a covering of rich cloth, usually velvet, which was edged in silver-gilt, gilded brass or copper; ornamental decoration in the same metals could be added to the surface of the helmet, allowing areas of cloth to show through.

In the period 1450–1460, a distinctive German style of sallet appeared. It was round-skulled but was less smoothly curving than the Italian sallet; its most obvious feature was that the rear of the helmet was drawn out into a long tail, sometimes consisting of a number of lames. One characteristic that distinguishes early German sallets from later German sallets up to c.1495, is the length of the helmet tail, which became more pronounced over time. The front of these helmets sometimes extended down to cover the upper face, with eye-slits provided for vision. Other versions retained the same outline, but the upper face was protected by a movable half-visor. German sallets were often worn with a separate scoop-shaped plate gorget, called a bevor, that extended from the upper chest to just below the nose and protected the wearer's lower face and throat. Most needed no added ventilation holes, as there was a natural gap where the visor or front of the helmet overlapped the bevor near the wearer's mouth.

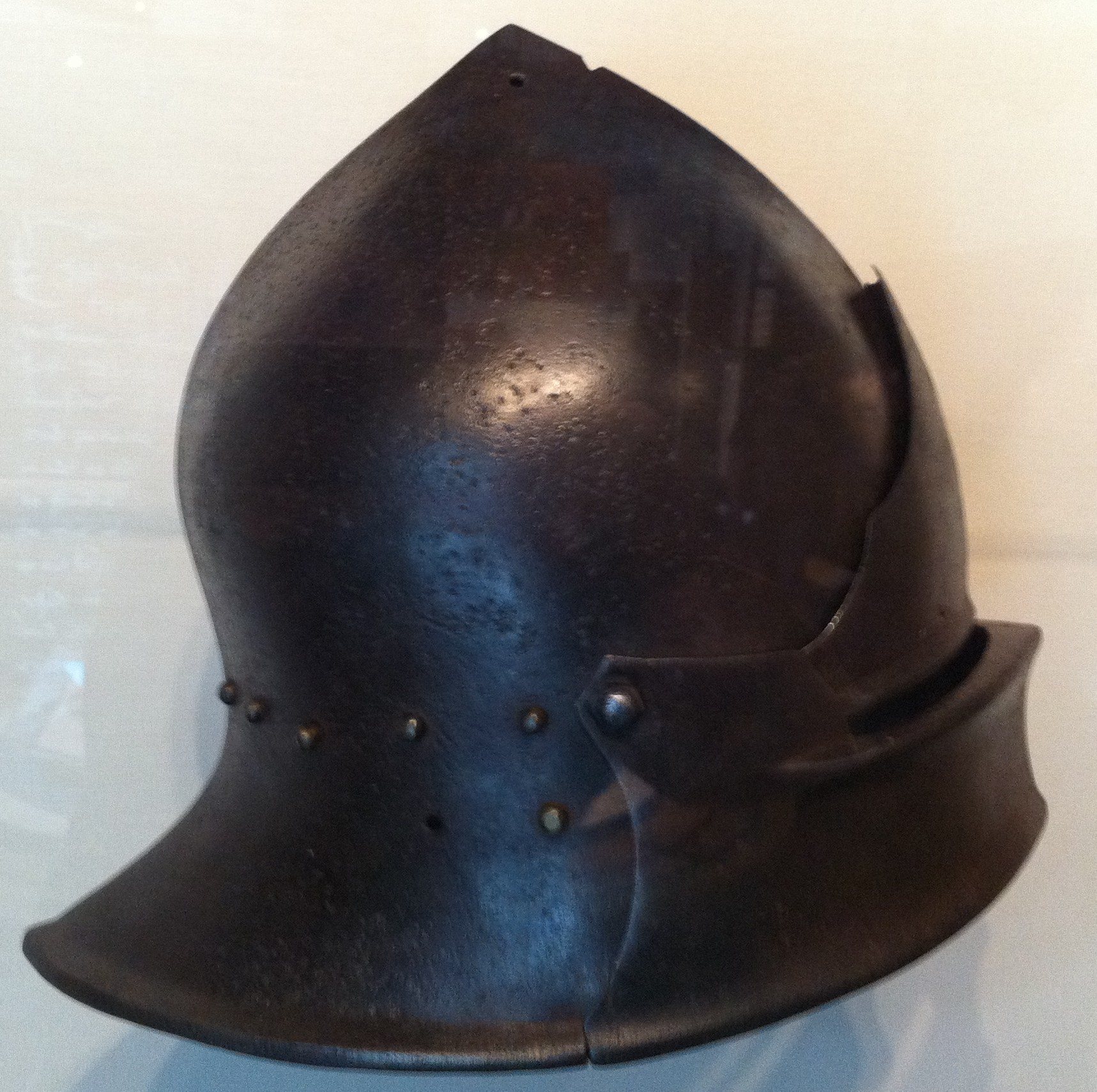
Sallet from c. 1460 in the "English-Burgundian" style, in many ways intermediate between the Italian and German forms

By the mid 15th century, a regional variety of sallet had evolved in England and the Netherlands, termed the 'English-Burgundian style' (the Netherlands were at that time ruled by the Duke of Burgundy). It was usually worn with a bevor by more completely armoured soldiers and had very similar facial protection to, and frontal appearance as, the German sallet. It was, however, more curvilinear, and possessed a less extreme projection to the rear. In many ways, it was intermediate between the German and Italian forms. French sallets were very similar to the English-Burgundian type and all have been classed as "short-tailed sallets".

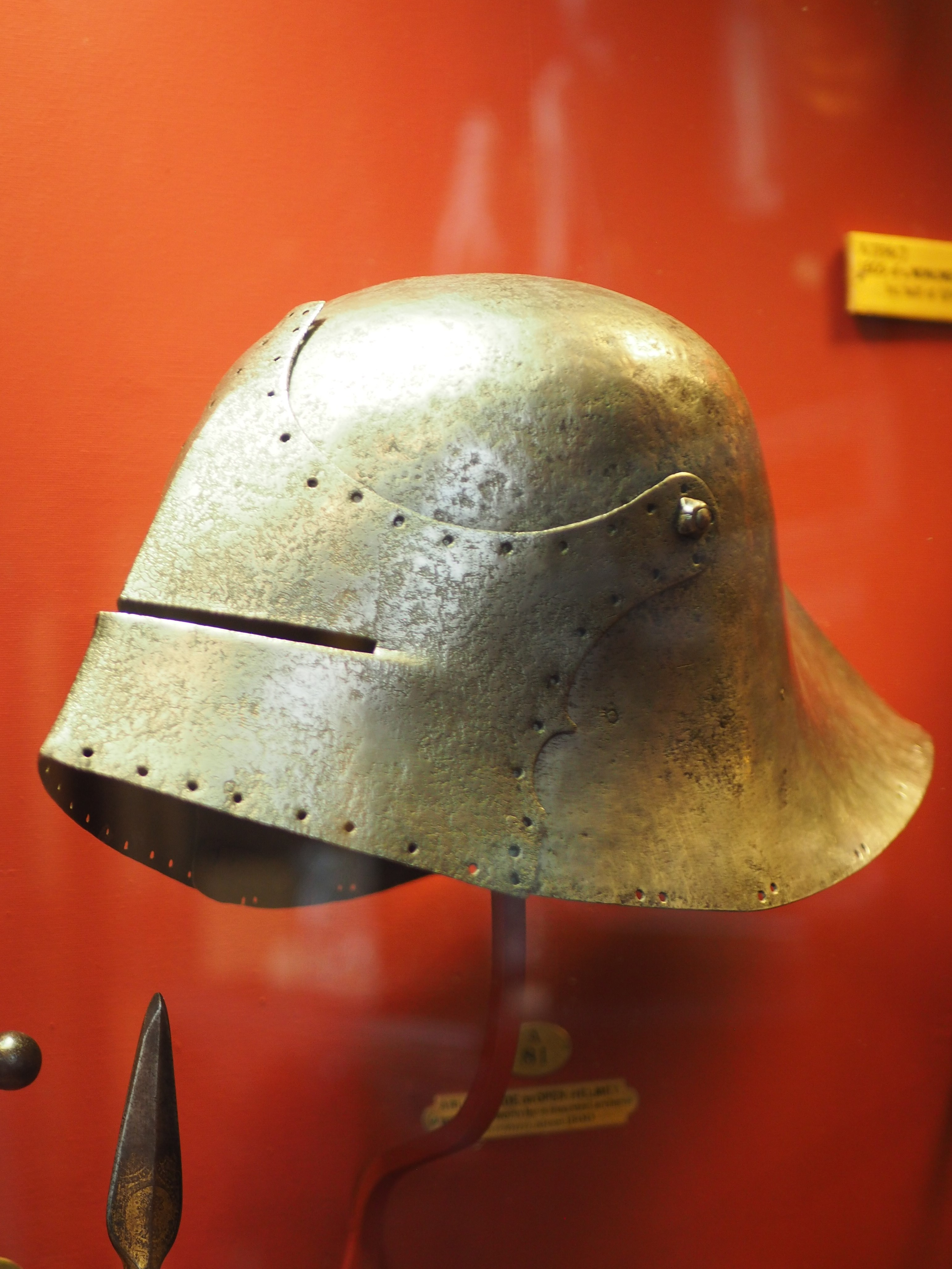
Wallace Collection A81, A black sallet from C. 1490 Germany depicting the rougher and less polished look of the style.

In the later 15th century munition-grade sallets were produced. These lower quality helmets were collectively known as "Black Sallets," due to their rough finish and lack of refinement. The larger armies of the period increased the demand for mass-produced, lower quality armour.

== Demise ==
In the last generations of German sallets, the bevor was articulated from the same pivot as the visor. Initially the bevor was attached inside the skull. When the long tail at the rear of the helmet was eventually shortened, from c. 1495, these later sallets became virtually indistinguishable from close helmets, and the articulation of the bevor moved to the outside of the skull. The sallet was gradually abandoned for field use in the first quarter of the 16th century, being largely replaced by the close helm and burgonet; however, it was retained into the mid century, in a heavily reinforced form, for some types of jousting.

The German-style sallet was the model for the World War I German Stahlhelm, whereas the kettle hat inspired most contemporary British and French helmets. An Anglo-Belgian helmet with a ballistic visor based on the sallet was designed at the request of Queen Elizabeth of Belgium.

== Gallery ==
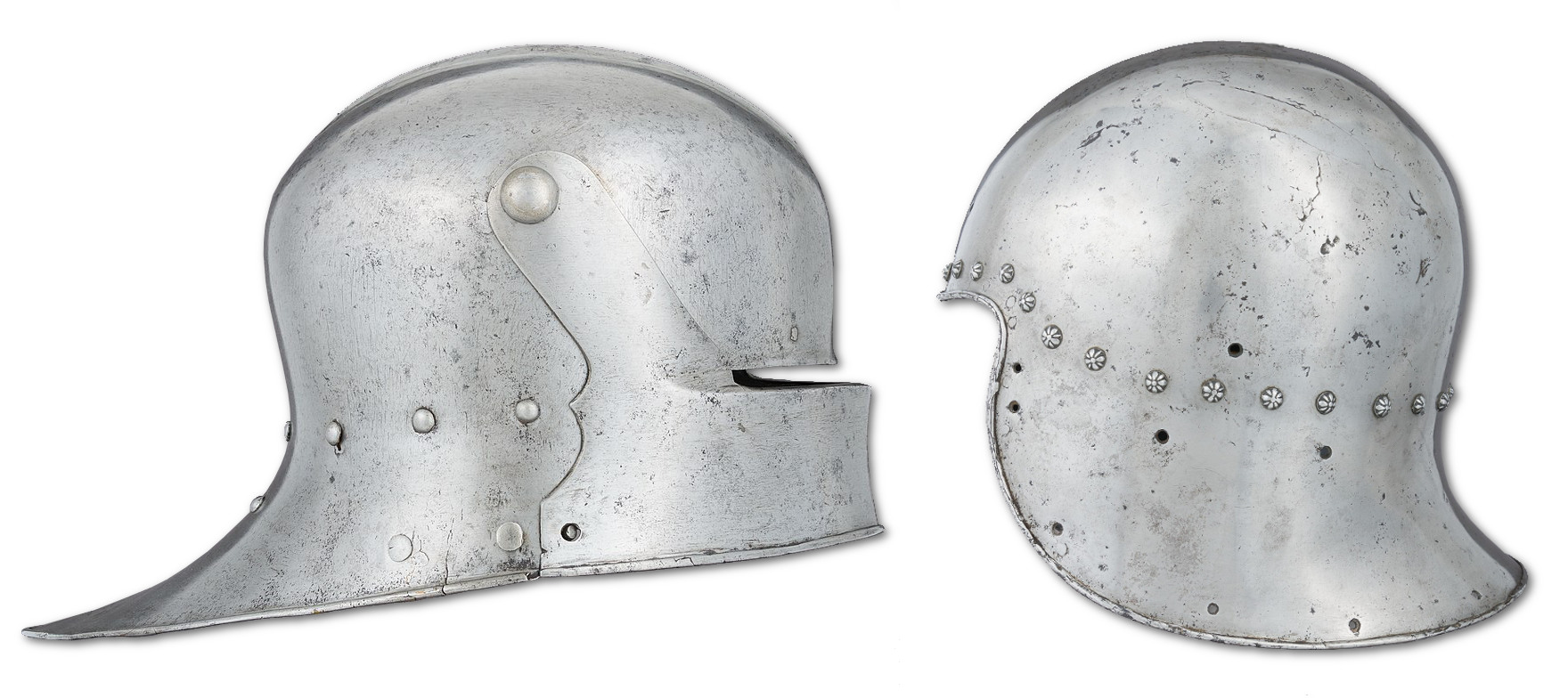
Main types of sallets: German (left), Italian (right)]

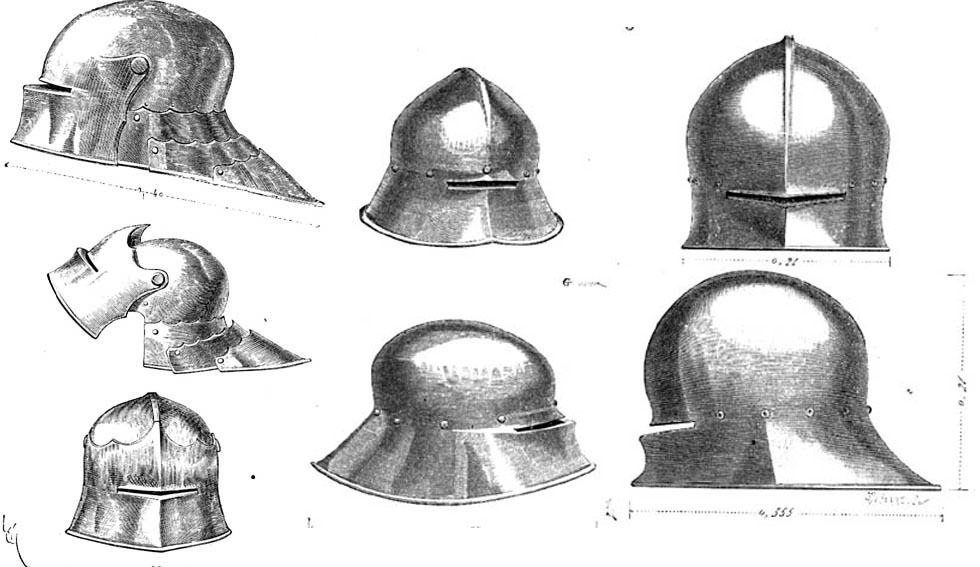
German sallets

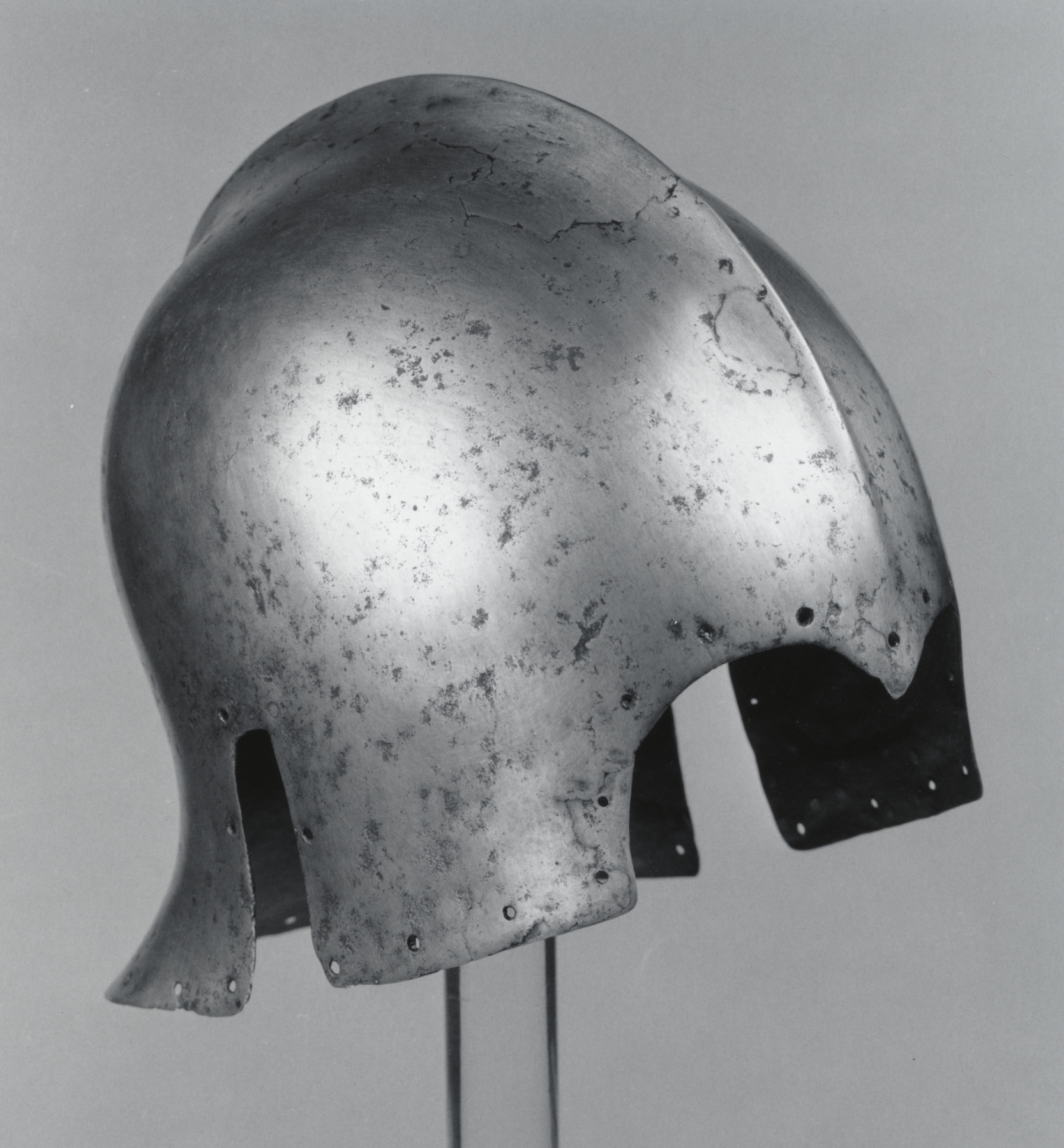
Italian sallet for an archer, c. 1450–1470

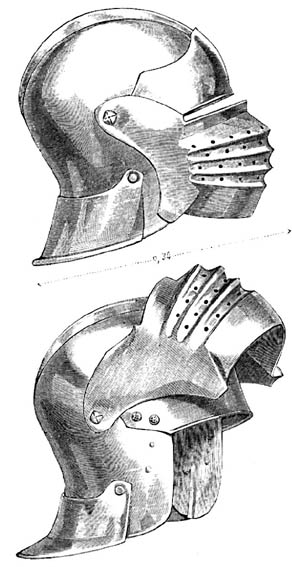
Italian bellows visored sallet (transitional from sallet to close helm)

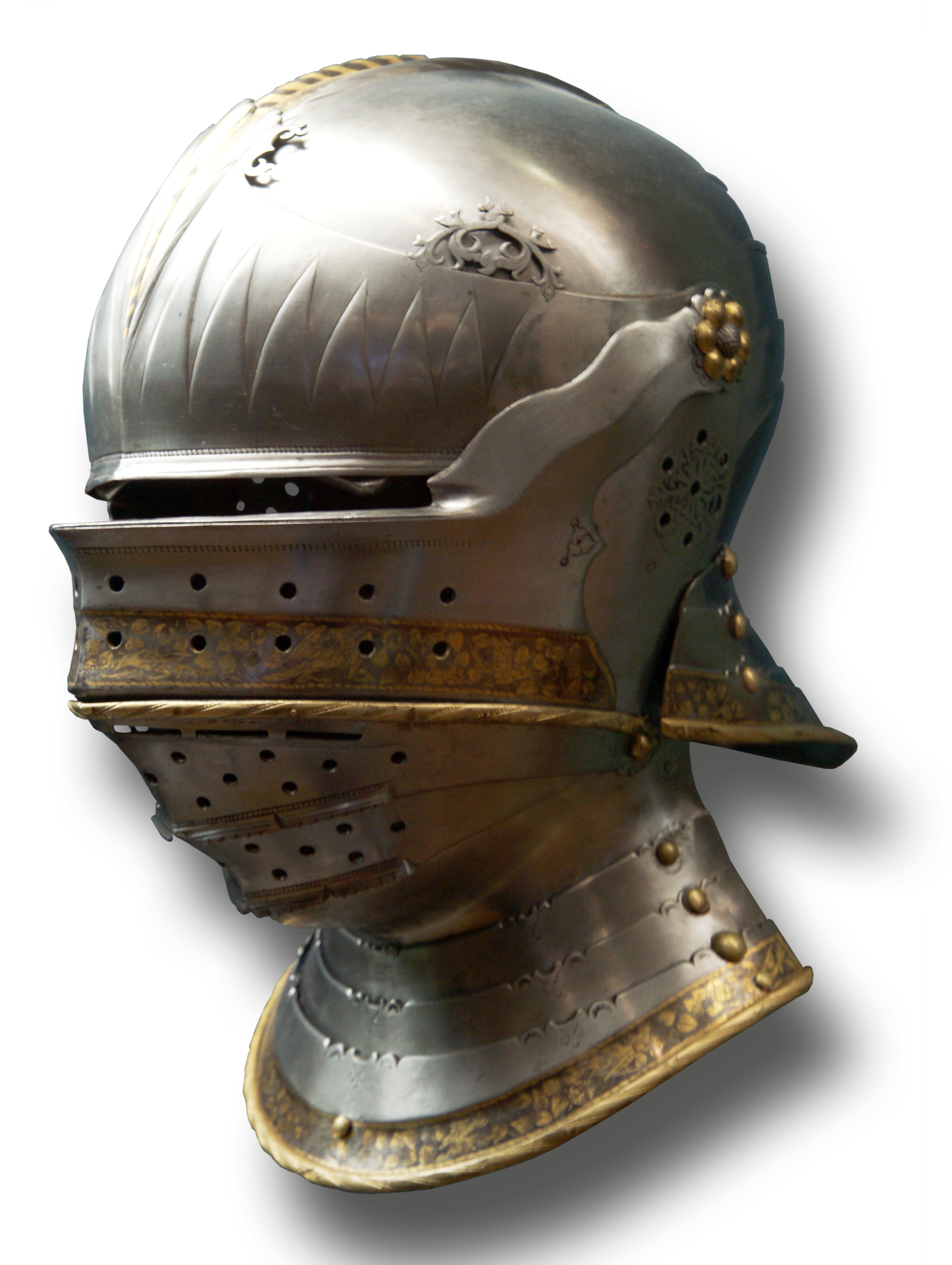
Late example of a German visored sallet (transitional to the close helm), c. 1495. The bevor and the brow-reinforce attach to the same pivot as the upper visor, and the tail at the rear of the helmet is much shorter than in earlier forms.

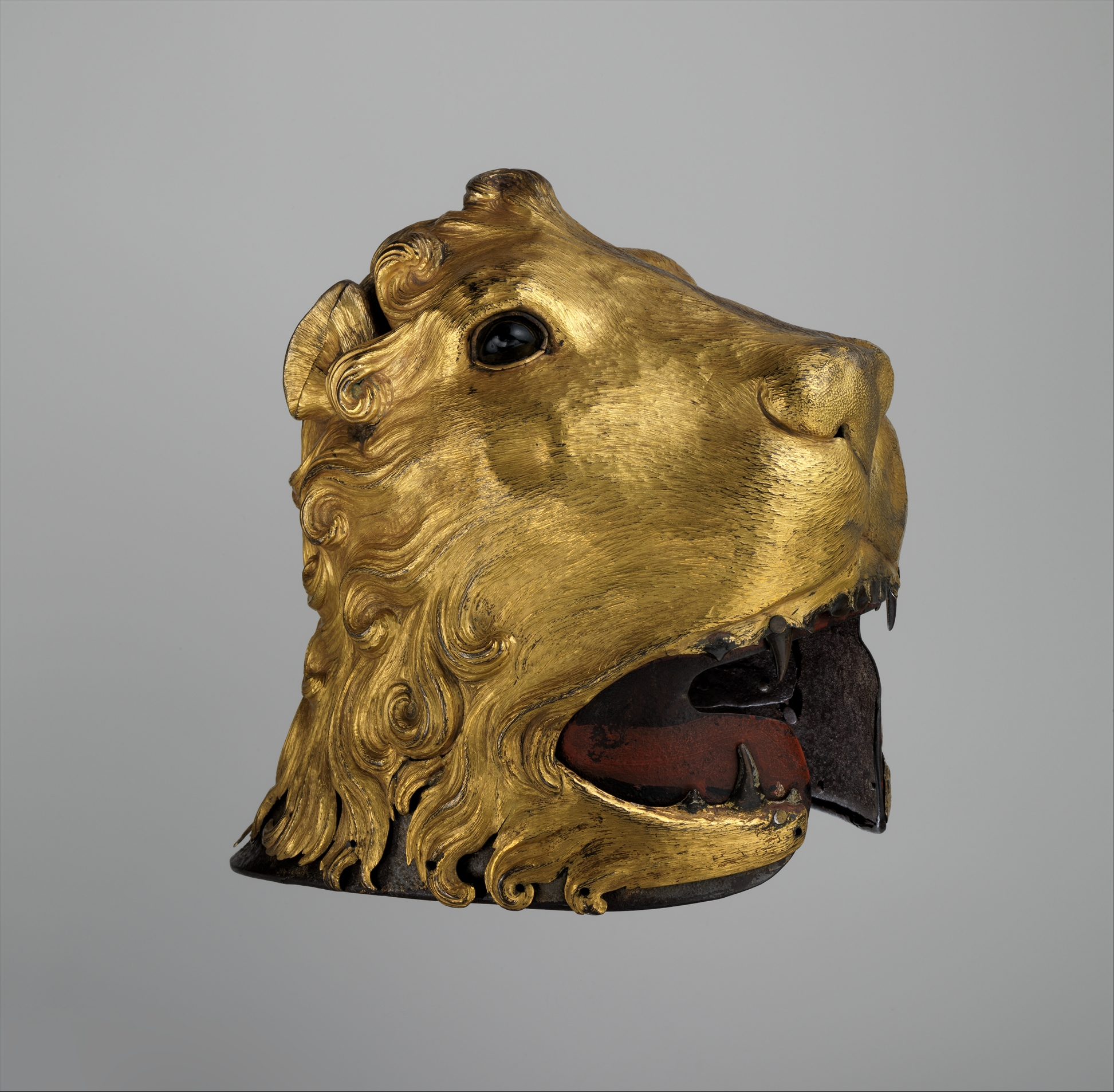
Barbuta sallet with decorative sheathing in the shape of a lion's head, Italian, 1475–1480, Metropolitan Museum of Art

== General and cited references ==
- Bedford, John (1968). The Collecting Man (registration required). New York: David McKay Co. p. 116. LCCN 68-54167. OCLC 1029291384.
- Bull, Stephen; North, Tony, ed. (1991). An Historical Guide to Arms & Armor. Facts On File, New York. ISBN 0-8160-2620-3. OCLC 24545790.
- Grancsay, Stephen V. (1950–51). "A Late Medieval Helmet (Sallet)". The Journal of the Walters Art Gallery, Vols. 13–14. pp. 20–29. Published by The Walters Art Museum Stable. JSTOR 20168831.
- Nickel, Helmut (Summer 1991). "Arms & Armors: From the Permanent Collection". The Metropolitan Museum of Art Bulletin, New Series, Vol. 49, No. 1. Published by The Metropolitan Museum of Art. doi:10.2307/3269006. JSTOR 3269006.
- Oakeshott, Ewart (1980). European Weapons and Armour: From the Renaissance to the Industrial Revolution (registration required). London: The Lutterworth Press. ISBN 0718821262. OCLC 216638200.
