= L'Eplattenier helmet =

Prototype military helmet designed for the Swiss Army by Charles l'Eplattenier in 1916

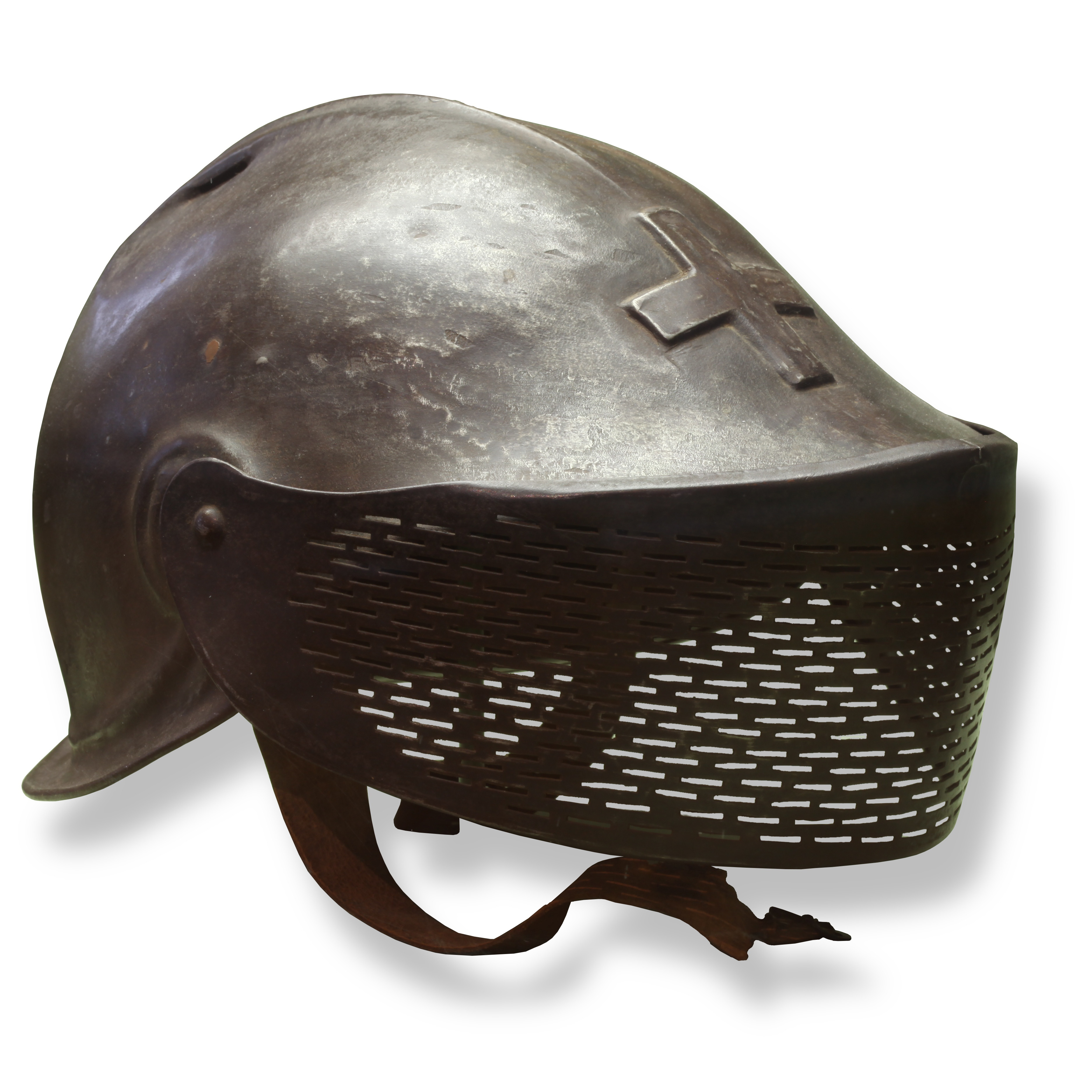
L'Eplattenier helmet, on display at Morges military museum.

The L'Eplattenier helmet was a prototype military helmet designed for the Swiss Army by Charles L'Eplattenier in 1916. Deemed too expensive to produce en masse, it was shunned in favour of a simpler design.

== Development ==
The outbreak of World War I was deemed important enough for Switzerland to enact a general mobilization on 3 August, 1914. Three divisions were raised, reinforcing the border defense in order to prevent a possible spillover of the fighting into Swiss territory. The introduction of the steel Stahlhelm and Adrian helmets by Germany and France respectively, prompted the Swiss Army to commission Charles L'Eplattenier, a patriotic sculptor, to develop a suitable counterpart. By 1916, Swiss entry into the war was becoming increasingly improbable, enabling L'Eplattenier to draw upon romantic paintings of Swiss battles. The Swiss War Department was concerned with obtaining a steel helmet comparable to foreign models in function, while also distinguishing it from the rest of the world by achieving aesthetic superiority.

The end result resembled the 1916, Franco-American, Dunand helmet, being however deeper on the sides and longer on the brow, while also bearing the characteristic Swiss cross which is embossed on the forehead. The detachable lining, is held on a carrier made of rattan, above it, two intersecting arches house a small cushion, which supports the main weight of the helmet. The helmet was first presented to the public on 15 September 1917, when divisional commander Tretoyens de Loys posed with it, in an unauthorized photo shoot which was included in an issue of Schweizer Illustrierte. The helmet was praised for its beauty, originality and Swiss character. A second version of the helmet was produced in 1918, reducing the visor's size. It was rejected due to its difficult manufacturing process and replaced with a simpler model, designed by First Lieutenant Paul Boesch. The new helmet removed the visor (deemed redundant) and the embossed cross, making it possible to manufacture it from a single plate of nickel-steel.

L'Eplattenier renounced the new model as a poor imitation of the Stahlhelm, while also filing a lawsuit against the Swiss government which brought him 30,000 swiss francs. The helmet's only deployment came on the day of the Armistice, when troops oversaw the progress of a general strike organized by revolutionary socialists. A second lawsuit was filed in 1930, by the German company Tarfwerke, which alleged that the Swiss had illegally infringed a patent they owned. The lawsuit was dismissed by the Swiss Federal Court, however Tarfwerke pressed on, filing for violation of cultural properties and eventually winning 5,000 reichsmarks.

== Notes ==
Citations
