= Close helmet =

Helmet that fully encloses the head, with pivoted bevor

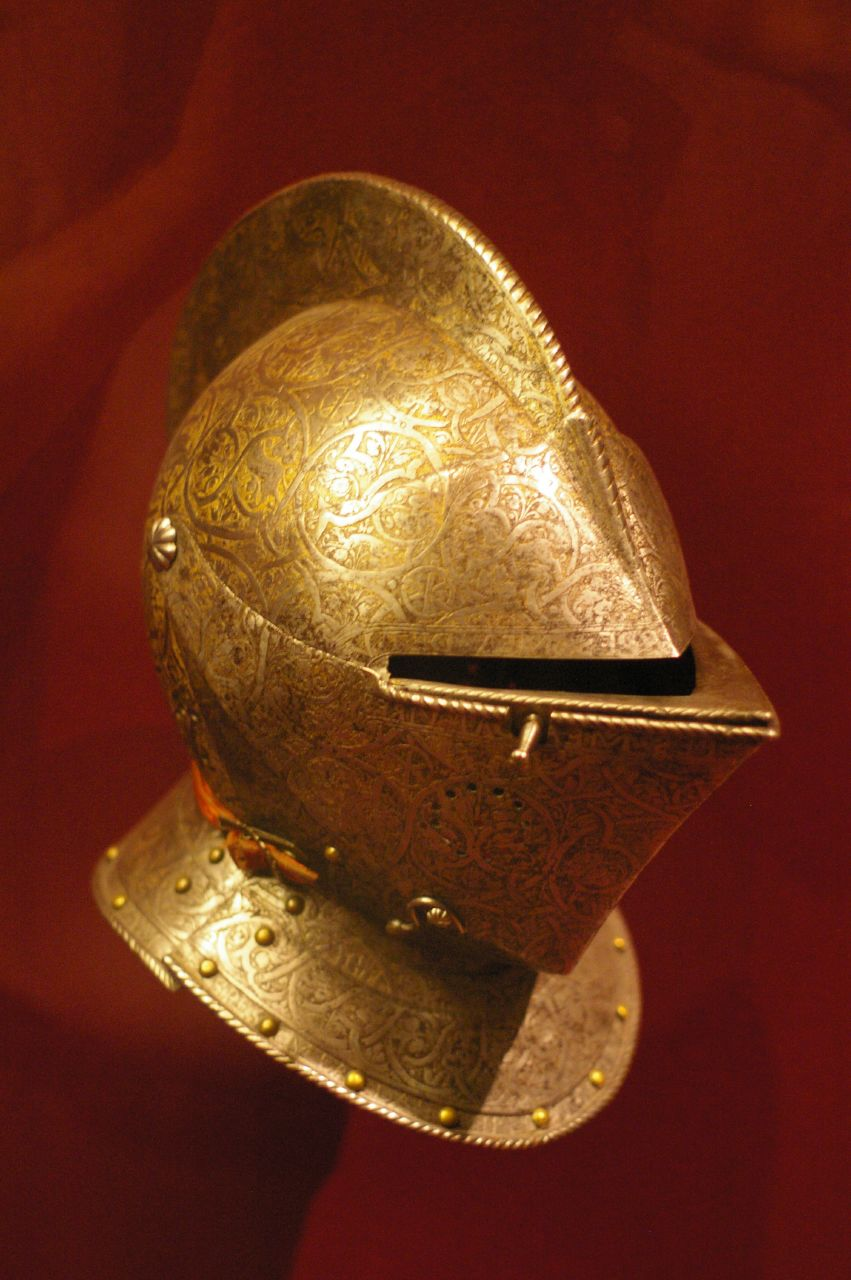
French close helmet of the later split-visor type, c. 1555–1560

The close helmet or close helm is a type of combat helmet that was worn by knights and other men-at-arms in the Late Medieval and Renaissance eras. It was also used by some heavily armoured, pistol-armed cuirassiers into the mid-17th century. It is a fully enclosing helmet with a pivoting visor and integral bevor.

== Characteristics ==
Comparison of close helm and armet in open position. Note the close helm uses a single pivot point for the double visor and bevor, while the armet has hinged cheek plates that lock in place.

The close helmet was developed from the later versions of the sallet and the superficially similar armet in the late 15th century. In contemporary sources it was sometimes also referred to as an 'armet', though modern scholarship draws a clear distinction between the two types.

While outwardly very similar to the armet, the close helmet had an entirely different method of opening. Like the armet, the close helmet followed the contours of the head and neck closely, and narrowed at the throat, therefore it required a mechanical method for opening and closing. While an armet opened laterally using two large hinged cheekpieces, a close helmet instead opened vertically via an integral rotating bevor, which was attached to the same pivots as its visor. The moving parts were usually secured when closed by pivot-hooks engaging pierced staples. Alternatively, spring-loaded studs could be employed. The bevor was often held closed by a strap.

== Variations ==
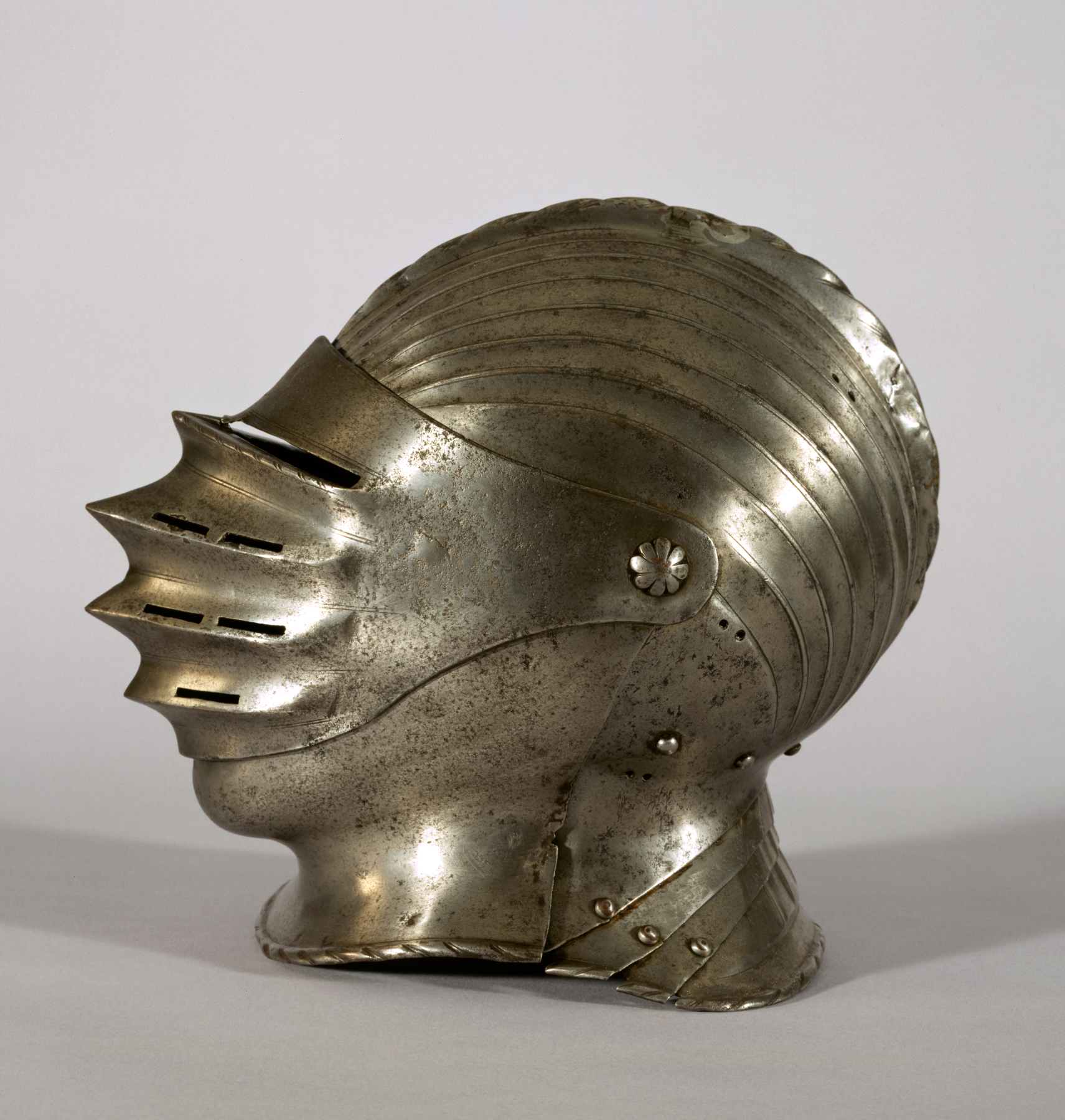
German close helmet of the Maximillian type, with bellows visor, c. 1520

Beginning around 1500, armour, including helmets, became more immediately influenced by fashion, especially in civilian clothing. As a result close helmets came in a huge variety of forms. The earliest close helmets resembled contemporary armets. In Italy, England and France in the period 1510–1525 helmets were rounded with visors of the 'sparrow's beak' form, whereas in Germany, the fluted 'Maximillian' style of armour produced distinctive types of helmet. The skulls of these helmets were globular with a low crest; many were decorated with fluting but some were plain. Two types of visor were produced, the Nuremberg form, which had a 'bellows' shape, and the Augsburg form, which was more projecting and is commonly called a 'monkey face'.

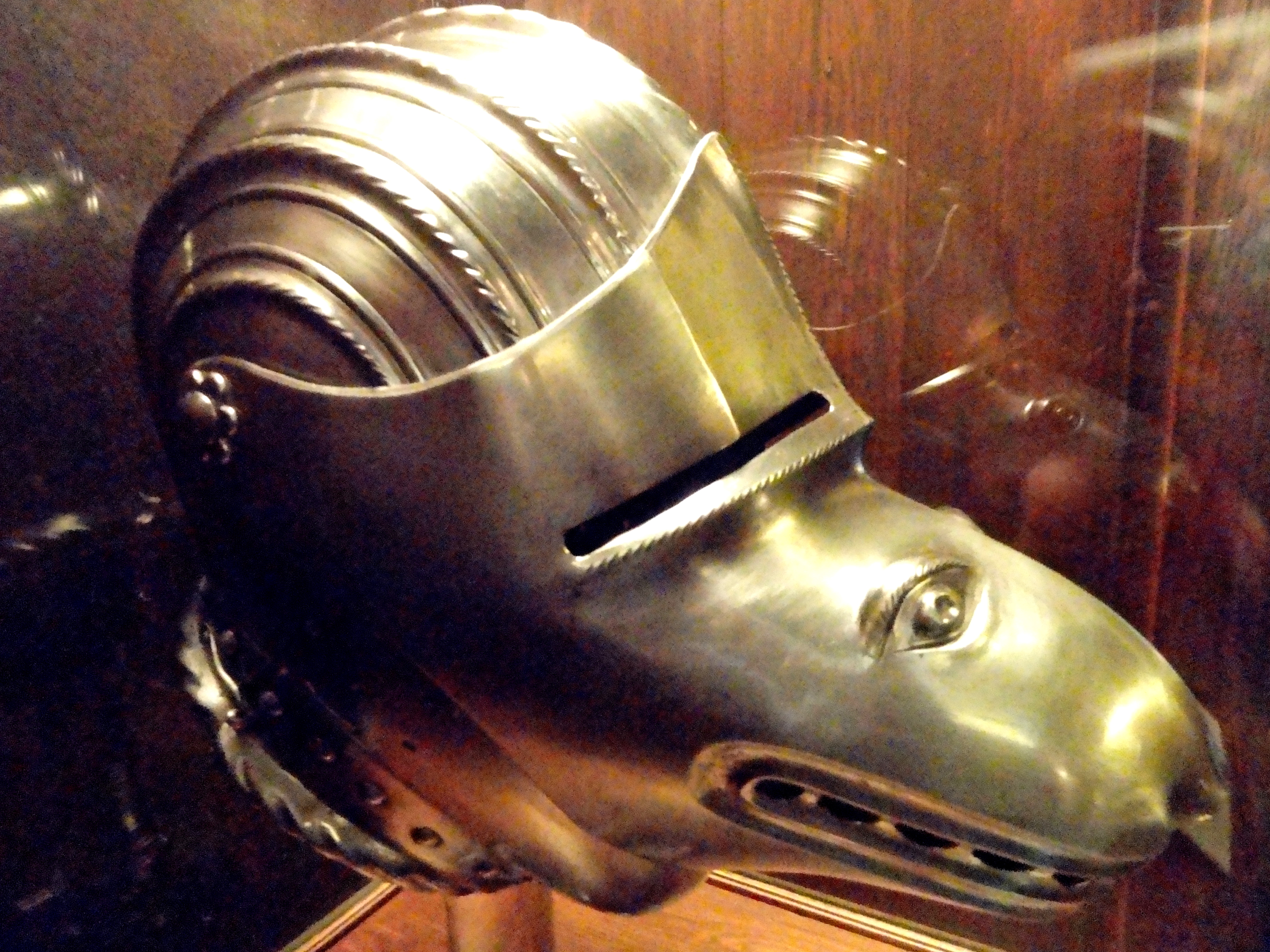
Close helmet with grotesque visor (modern reproduction of a German helmet of c. 1520 style)

From the 1520s a new, almost universal, variety of close helmet was developed. The previous forms of one-piece visor were replaced by a more complex system of face covering. The visor was split, below the eye-slits, into two independently pivoting parts. The lower half, called the ventail or upper bevor, was projecting and shaped like the prow of a modern ship. The upper visor, when closed, fitted within the upper edge of the ventail; it could be raised independently of the ventail by the provision of a projecting lifting peg. At the same time, on most helmets, the base of the bevor and the lower edge of the skull had laminated gorget plates attached. Crests, running from front to back tended to become taller in the course of the 16th century, becoming particularly exaggerated in some Italian-made examples, before becoming reduced in size at the century's close.

There are many helmets surviving with 'grotesque' visors. These are thought to have been used as part of a 'costume armour' worn at parades and during festivities. Some of these masks portrayed the heads of animals or demons, whilst others were evidently for comic effect, being caricatures of the faces of their owners.

== Use ==
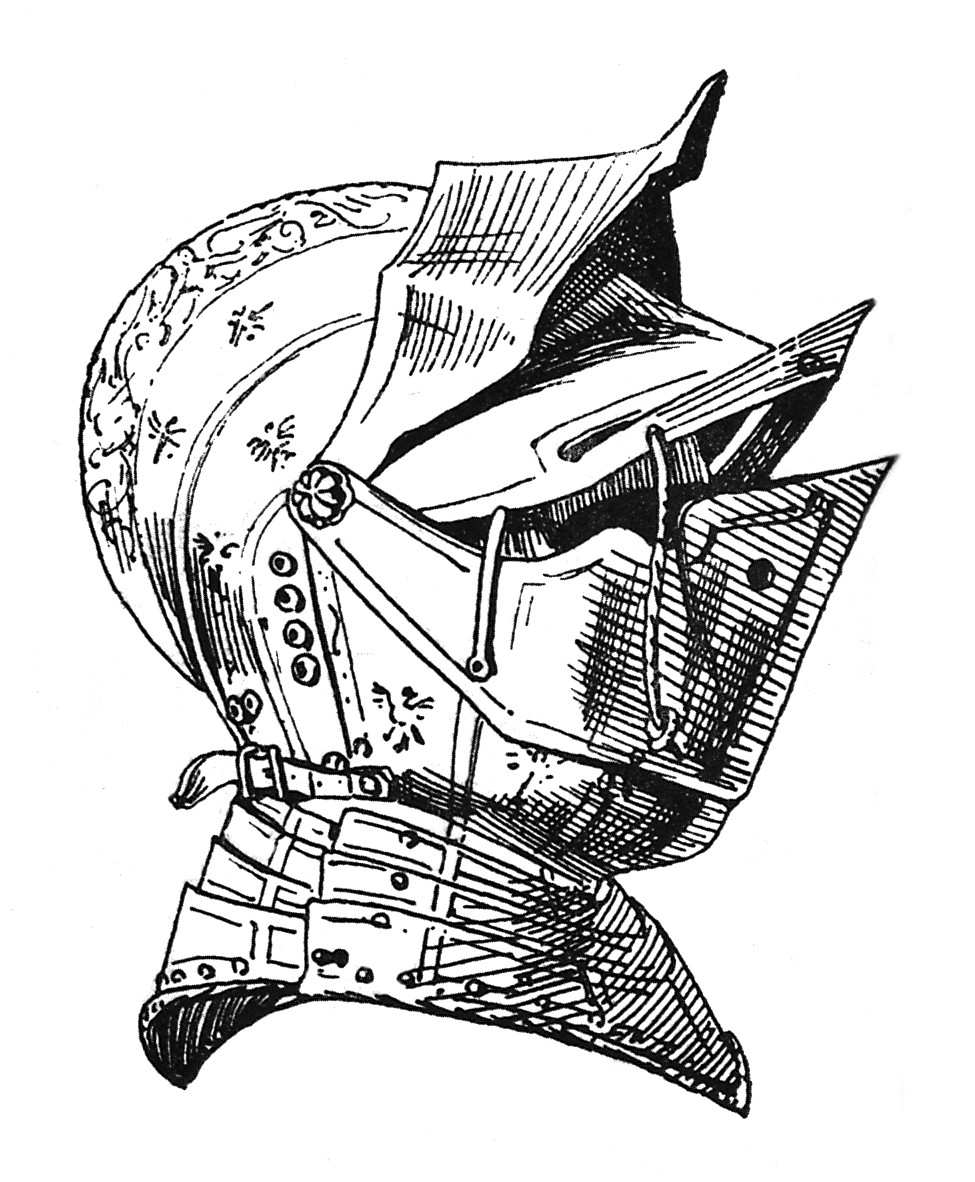
A close helmet with a split visor (also with an extra pivoting peak), c. 1560 (notice that its bevor – secured by a strap – is attached to the same pivot as the visors)

The close helmet was used on the field of battle, but was also popular for use in tournaments. Wealthy men often owned 'garnitures', which were armours with interchangeable parts ('pieces of exchange') to suit heavy or light field use, and the many different forms of tournament combat. Garnitures would usually include elements for reinforcing the left side of the helmet for use in jousting. Such reinforcing pieces were called 'double pieces' or 'pieces of advantage'.

== Bibliography ==
- Gravett, Christopher (2006) Tudor Knight. Osprey Publishing, London.
- Oakeshott, Ewart (2000) European Weapons and Armour. From Renaissance to the Industrial Revolution. The Boydell Press, Woolbridge. ISBN 0-85115-789-0
