= Dō (armour) =

Japanese armour for the torso

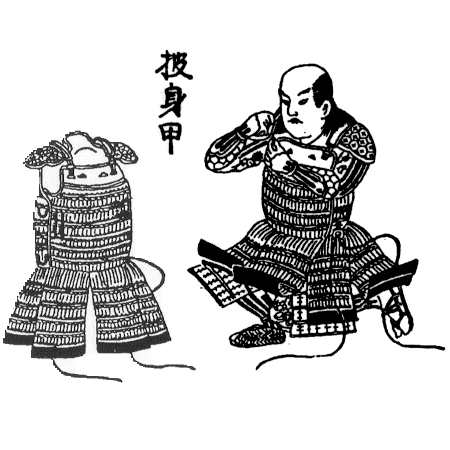
A woodblock print of a samurai putting on a dō

Dō or dou (胴) "breastplate, cuirass" is one of the major components of Japanese armour worn by the samurai and ashigaru or foot soldiers of feudal Japan.

== History ==
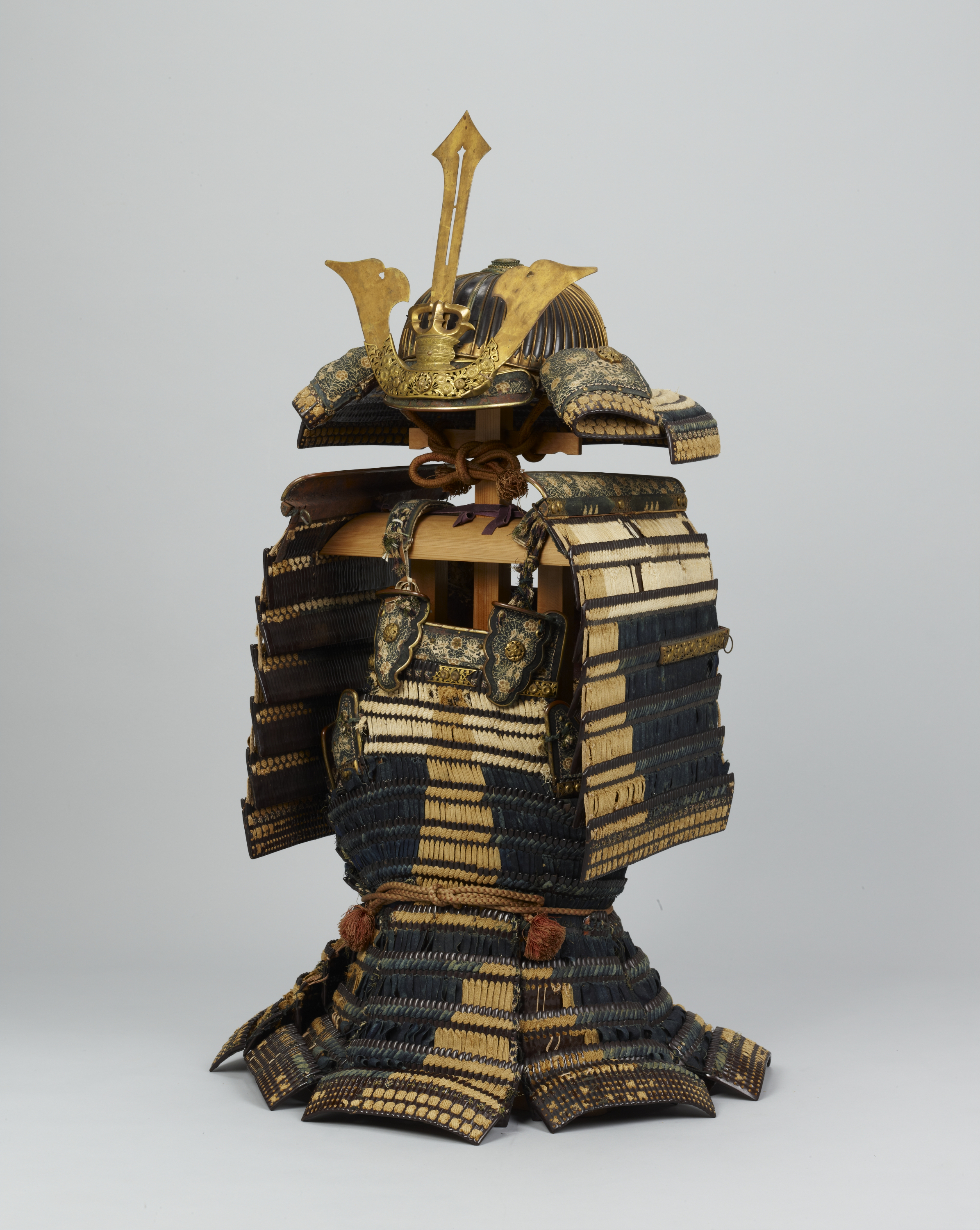
Dō-maru with Black and White Lacing. Muromachi period, 15th century, Tokyo National Museum, Important Cultural Property

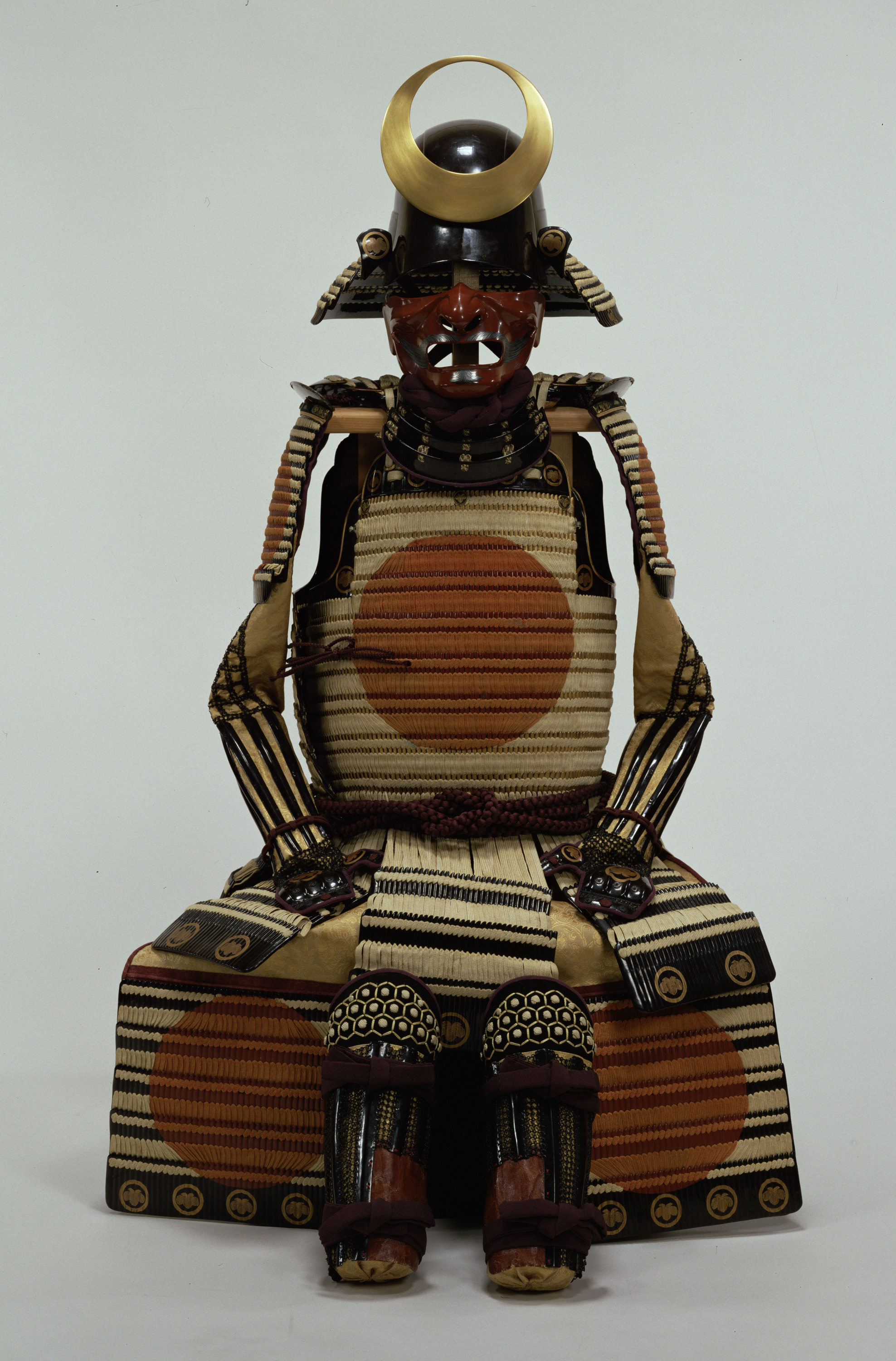
Gusoku Type Armour With do-maru cuirass and white lacing, Edo period, 17th century, Tokyo National Museum

The predecessor of the dō was manufactured in Japan as early as the fourth century. Tankō, worn by foot soldiers, and keikō, worn by horsemen, were both pre-samurai types of early Japanese cuirass constructed from iron plates connected by leather thongs.

During the Heian period (794 to 1185), the cuirass evolved into the more familiar style of armour worn by the samurai known as the dō. Japanese armourers started to use hardened leather along with iron in their construction methods, and lacquer was used to weather-proof the parts. By the end of the Heian period the Japanese cuirass had arrived at the shape recognized as being distinctly samurai. Leather and or iron scales were used to construct samurai armours, with leather and eventually silk lace used to connect the individual scales (kozane) which these cuirasses were now being made from.

In the 16th century Japan began trading with Europe during what would become known as the Nanban trade. Samurai acquired European cuirasses which they modified and combined with domestic armour as it provided better protection from the newly introduced matchlocks known as teppo or Tanegashima from the Portuguese trading Post in the town of the same name. The introduction of the Teppo in 1543 along with a change in battle tactics caused armourers to change the design of the dō from the centuries-old lamellar armour to plate armour constructed from iron and steel plates. This type of armour was called tosei gusoku "new armour". Bullet resistant dō were developed, this type of armour was called tameshi gusoku "bullet tested", allowing Samurai to continue wearing their armour despite the increasing use of firearms.

The warfare of the Sengoku period (15th and 16th centuries) required large quantities of armour to be produced for the ever-growing armies of foot soldiers (ashigaru). Simple munition quality (okashi or lent) dō were massed produced including tatami dō which could be folded.

The victory of Tokugawa Ieyasu at the Battle of Sekigahara in 1600, and his subsequent rise as shōgun in 1603, marked the end of the Sengoku period. By this time Samurai continued to use both plate and lamellar cuirasses as a symbol of their status, but traditional armours were no longer necessary. During the Edo period, lightweight and concealed armour became popular as there was still a need for personal protection. Civil strife, duels, assassinations, and peasant revolts required the use of tatami dō as well as kusari katabira (chain armour jackets) and armoured sleeves as well as other types of armour which could be worn under ordinary clothing. Edo period samurai were in charge of internal security and would wear various types of kusari gusoku (chain armour) and shin and arm protection as well as forehead protectors (hachi-gane). Traditional armour continued to be worn and used in Japan until the end of the Meiji period in the 1860s, with the last widespread use in 1877 during the Satsuma Rebellion.

== Types of dō ==
The type of dō that originally came with a matched suit of armour defined the name for that particular suit of armour, for example, a suit of armour that came with a hotoke would be called a hotoke dō gusoku; a suit of armour that came with a karuta tatami dō would be called a karuta tatami dō gusoku.

=== Kozane dō ===
True kozane dō are of lamellar construction using individual scales known as kozane, they were used before the introduction of firearms in Japanese warfare.

- Ō-yoroi, an early type of dō used by mounted samurai and constructed with hon kozane.
- Dō-maru, an early type of dō with no hinge that opened on the right side, constructed with hon kozane.
- Haramaki dou (dō), originally an early type of dō which opened in the back, constructed with hon kozane, in later times "harimaki" was used to describe any dō that opened in the back.
- Hon kozane dou (dō), any dō constructed with hon kozane.
- Hon-iyozane dou (dō) or Nuinobe dō, any dō constructed with hon iyozane.

==== Kozane dō gallery ====
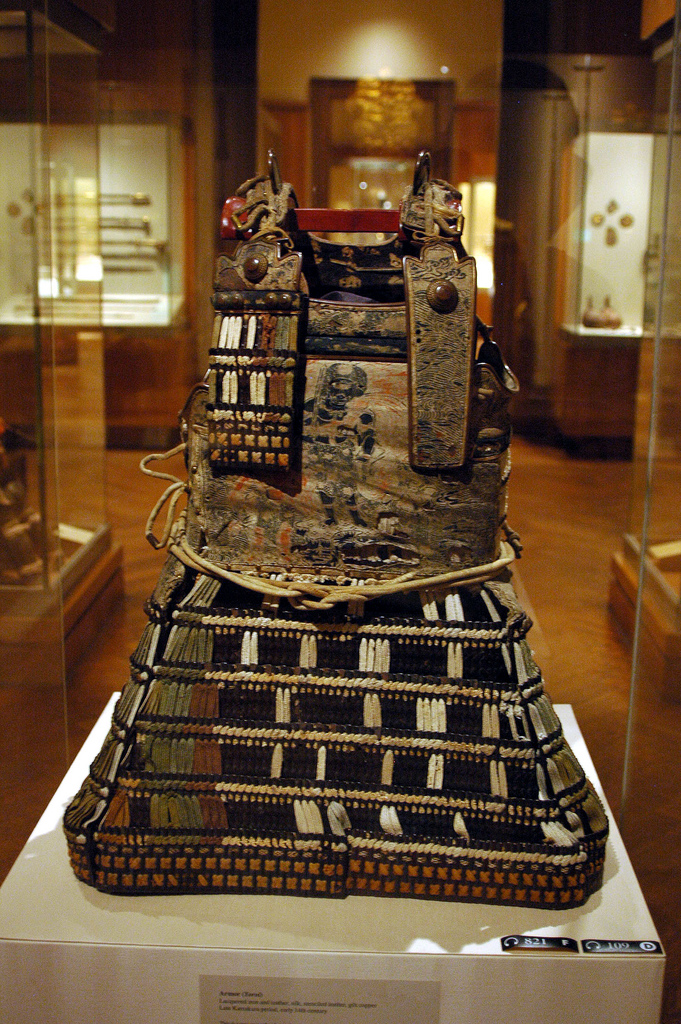
Ō-Yoroi, constructed with hon kozane

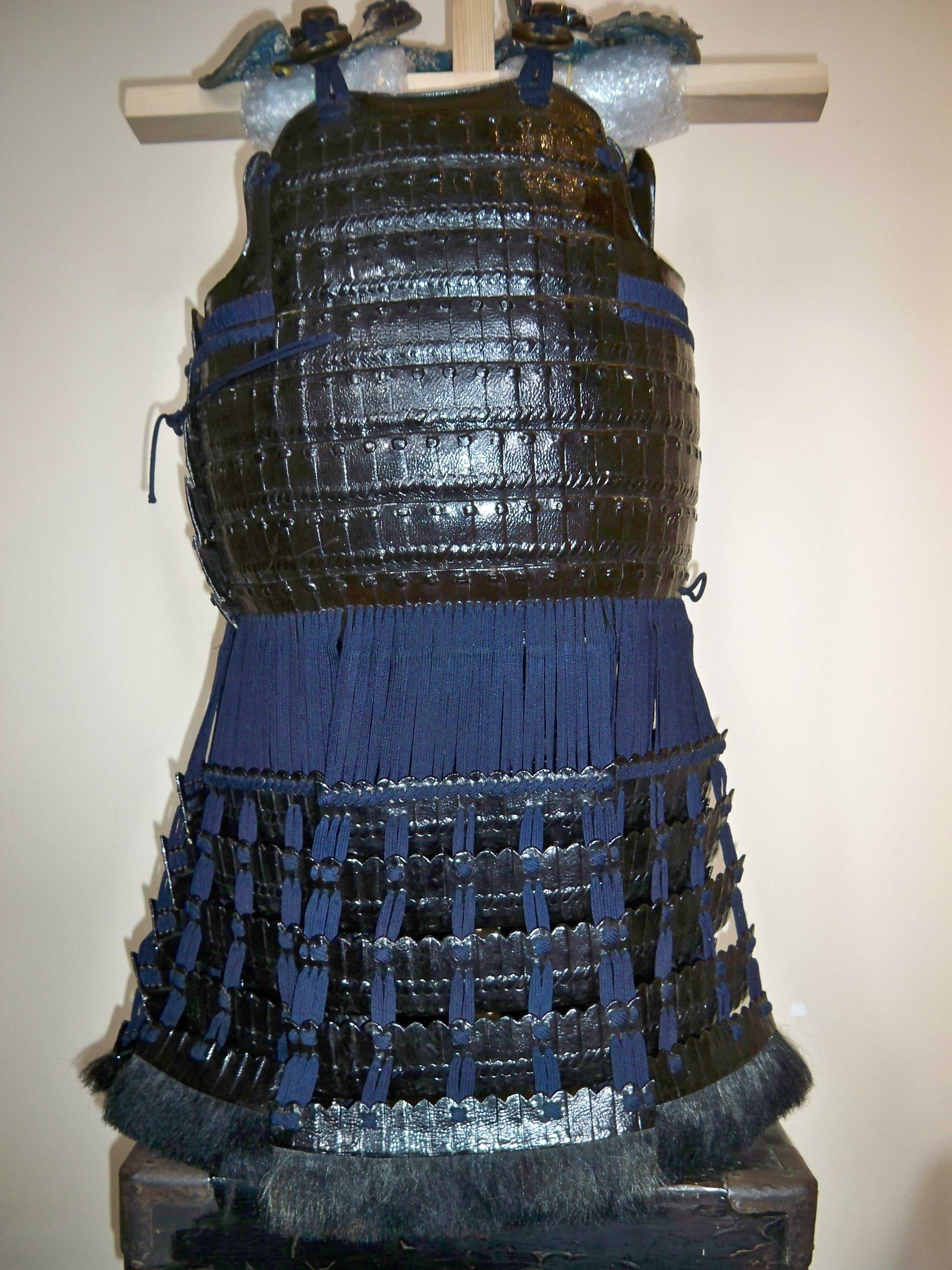
Hon iyozane dō

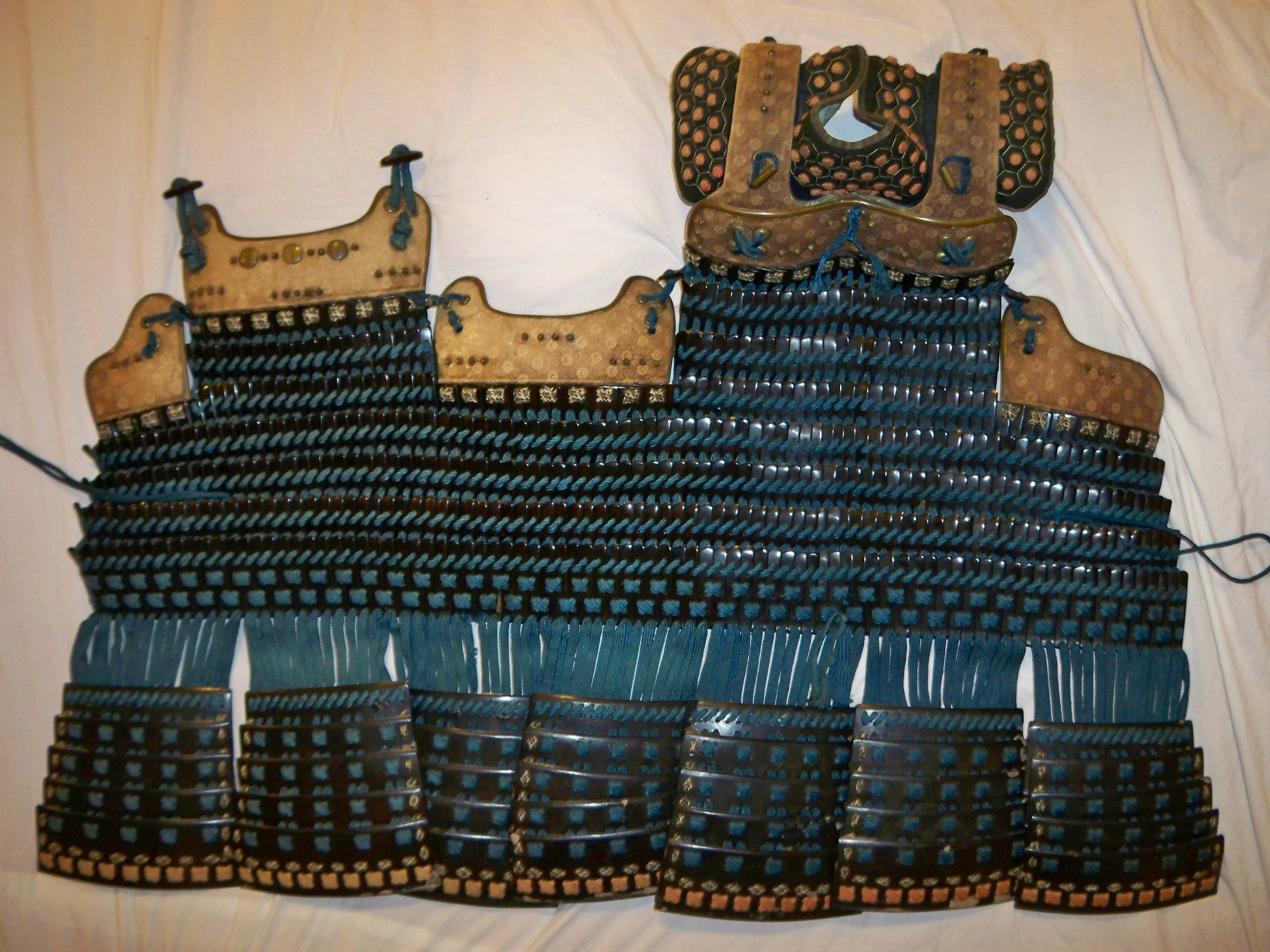
Hon kozane dō

==== Types of kozane ====
- Hon kozane (true small individual scales)
- Hon iyozane (true large individual scales)
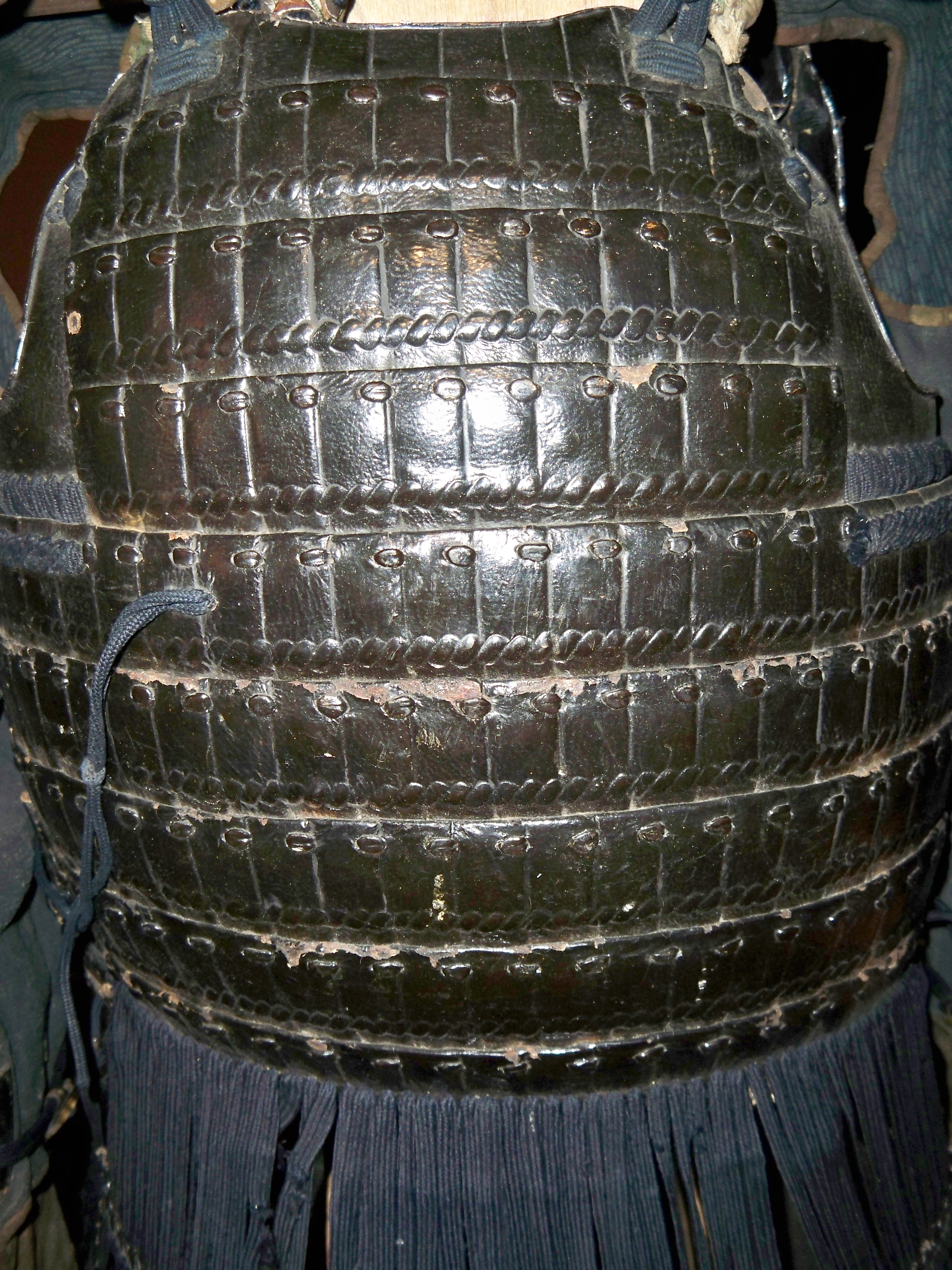
Hon iyozane dō

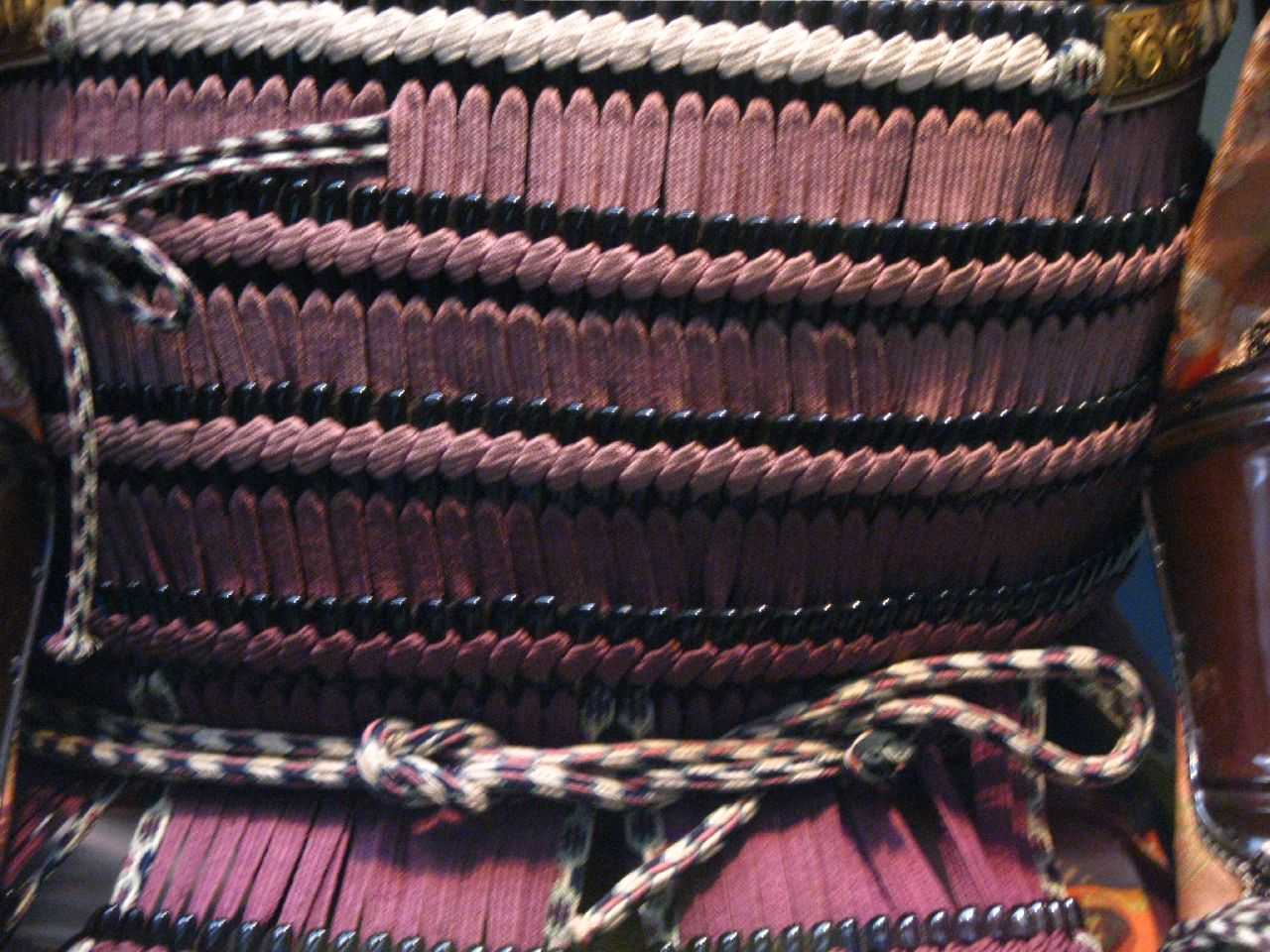
Hon kozane dō, showing the individual kozane (scales) and the silk lace (odoshi)

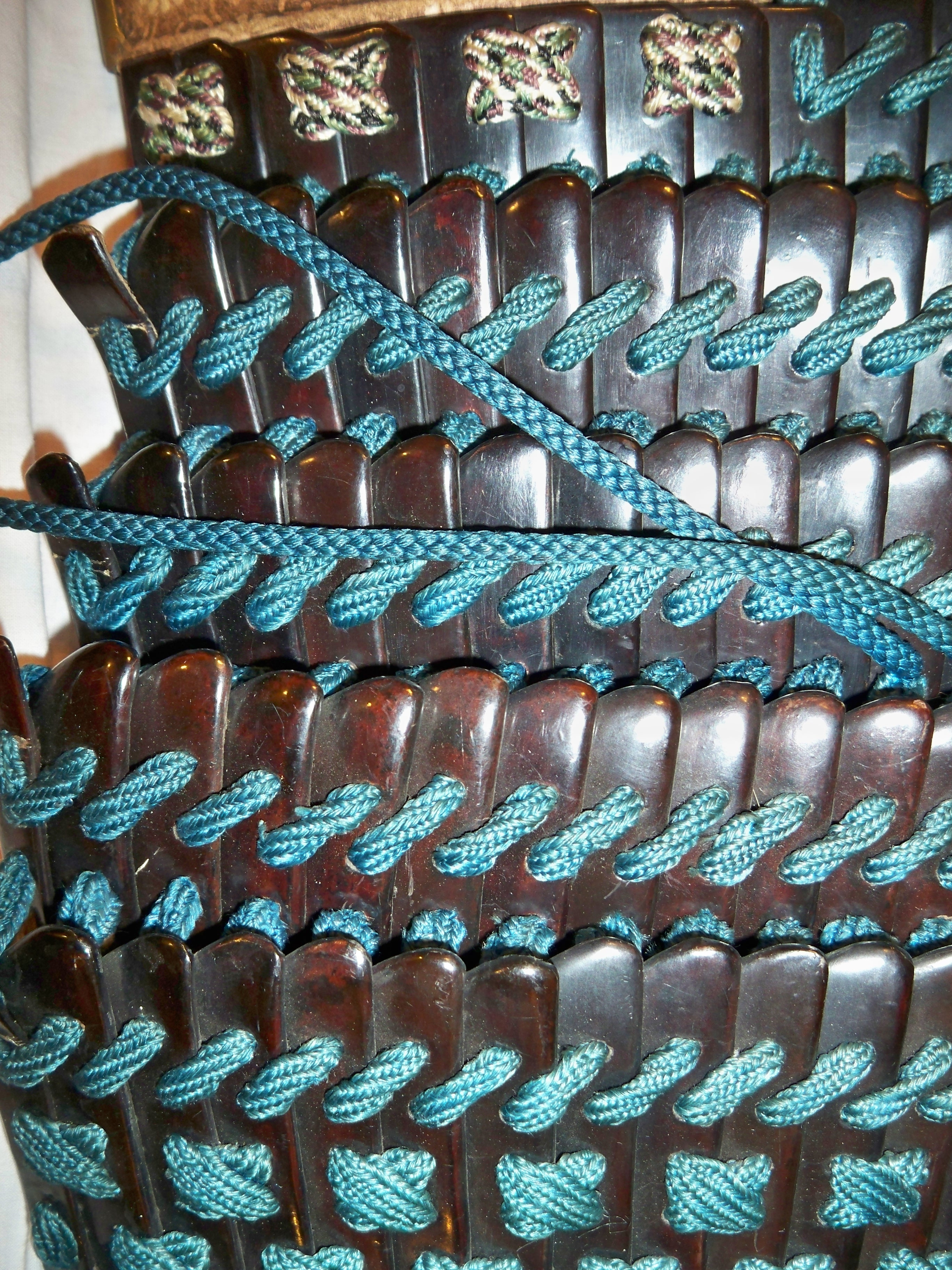
Nerigawa (hardened leather) hon kozane (close up)

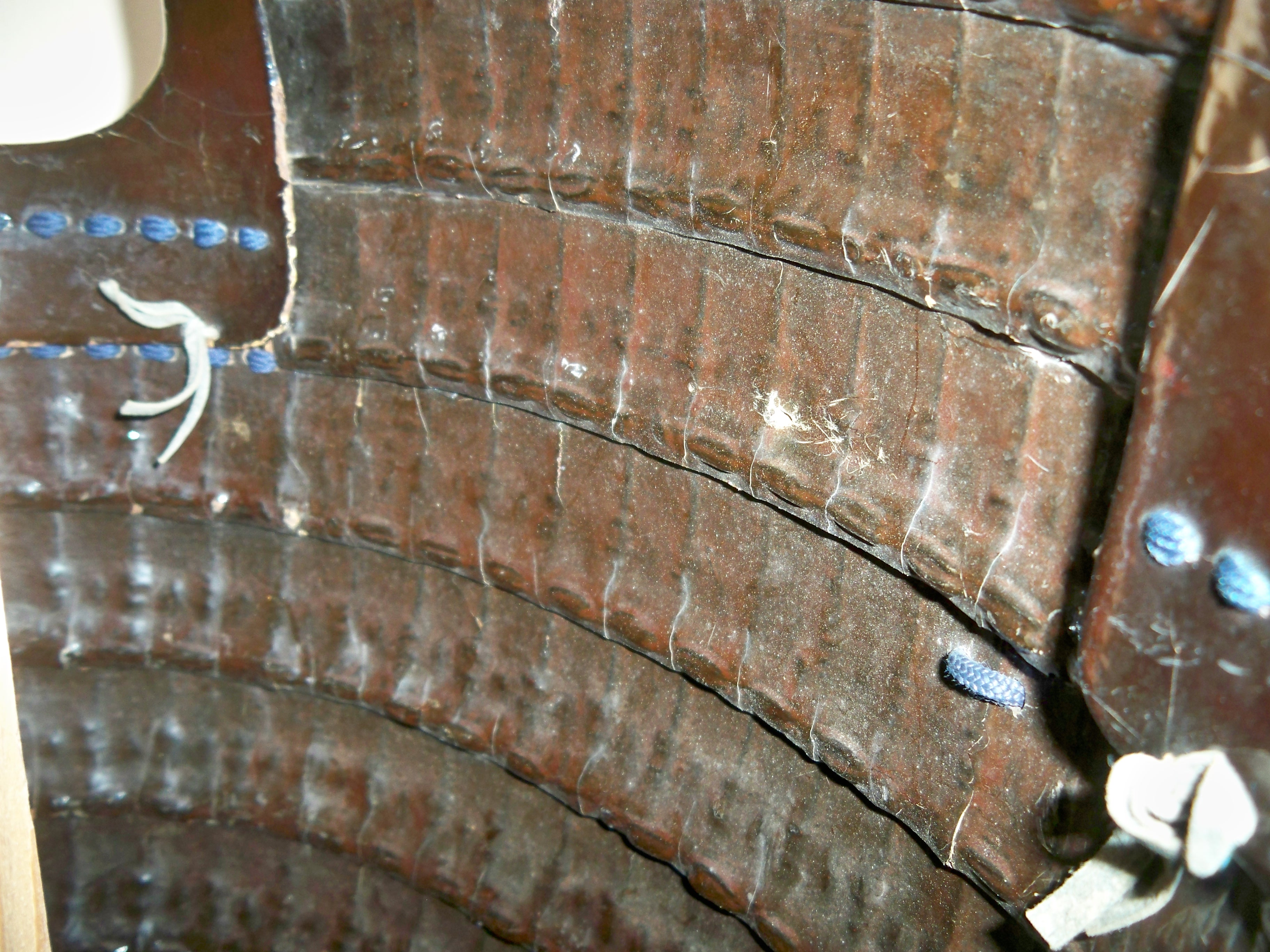
Inside view of a hon iyozane dō

=== Kiritsuke kozane dou (dō) ===
False kozane dou (dō) in the form of 'kiritsuke hon iyozane or kiritsuke hon kozane mimic the construction of lamellar armour but instead of being made from true individual scales kiritsuke kozane are actually constructed with long lames (strips or rows) of armour lashed together and are a form of laminar armour.

==== Types of Kiritsuke kozane ====
- Kiritsuke hon kozane (false small scales)
- Kiritsuke hon iyozane (false large scales)

==== Kiritsuke kozane gallery ====
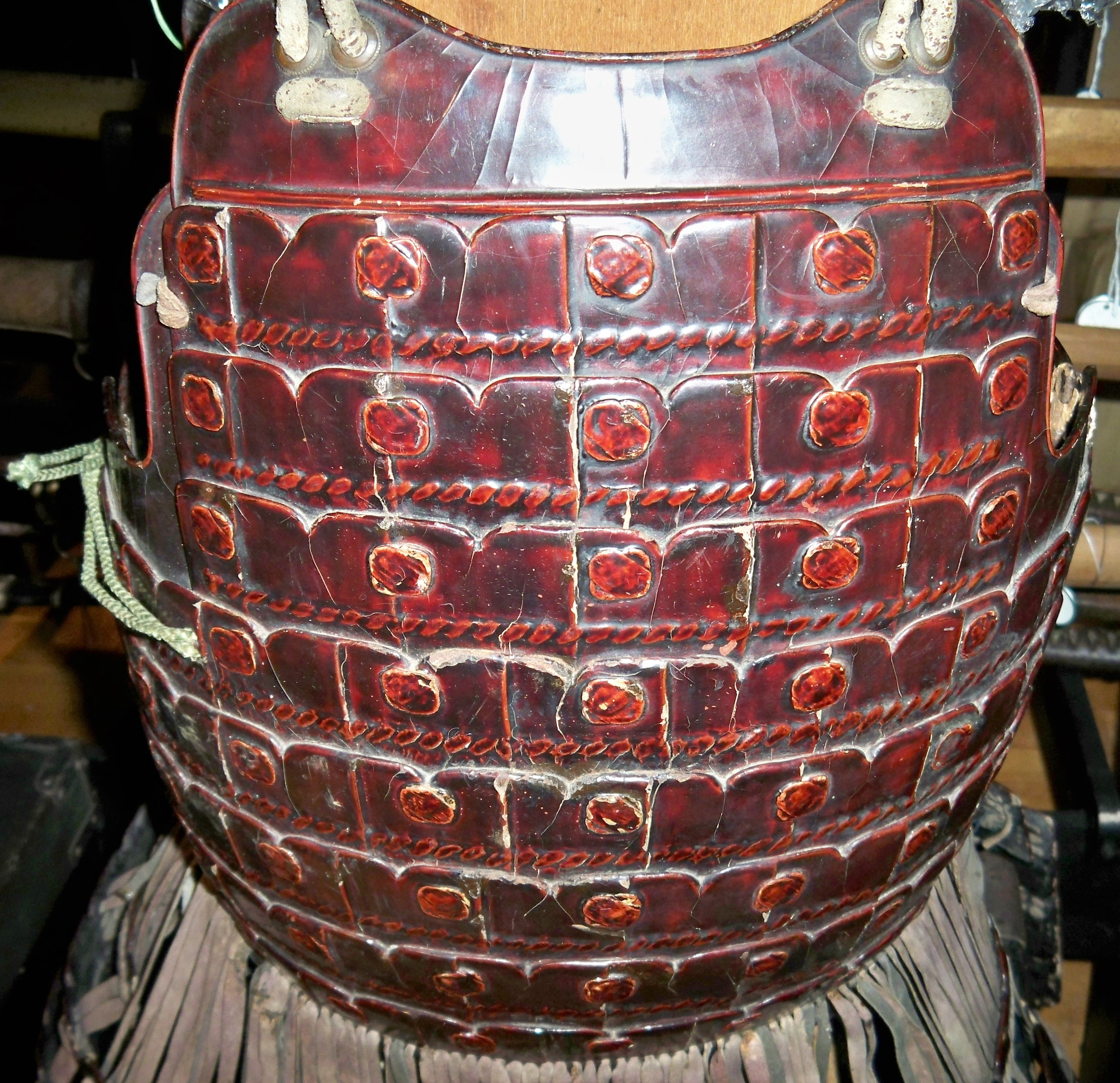
Kiritsuke iyozane dō (false/simulated iyozane)

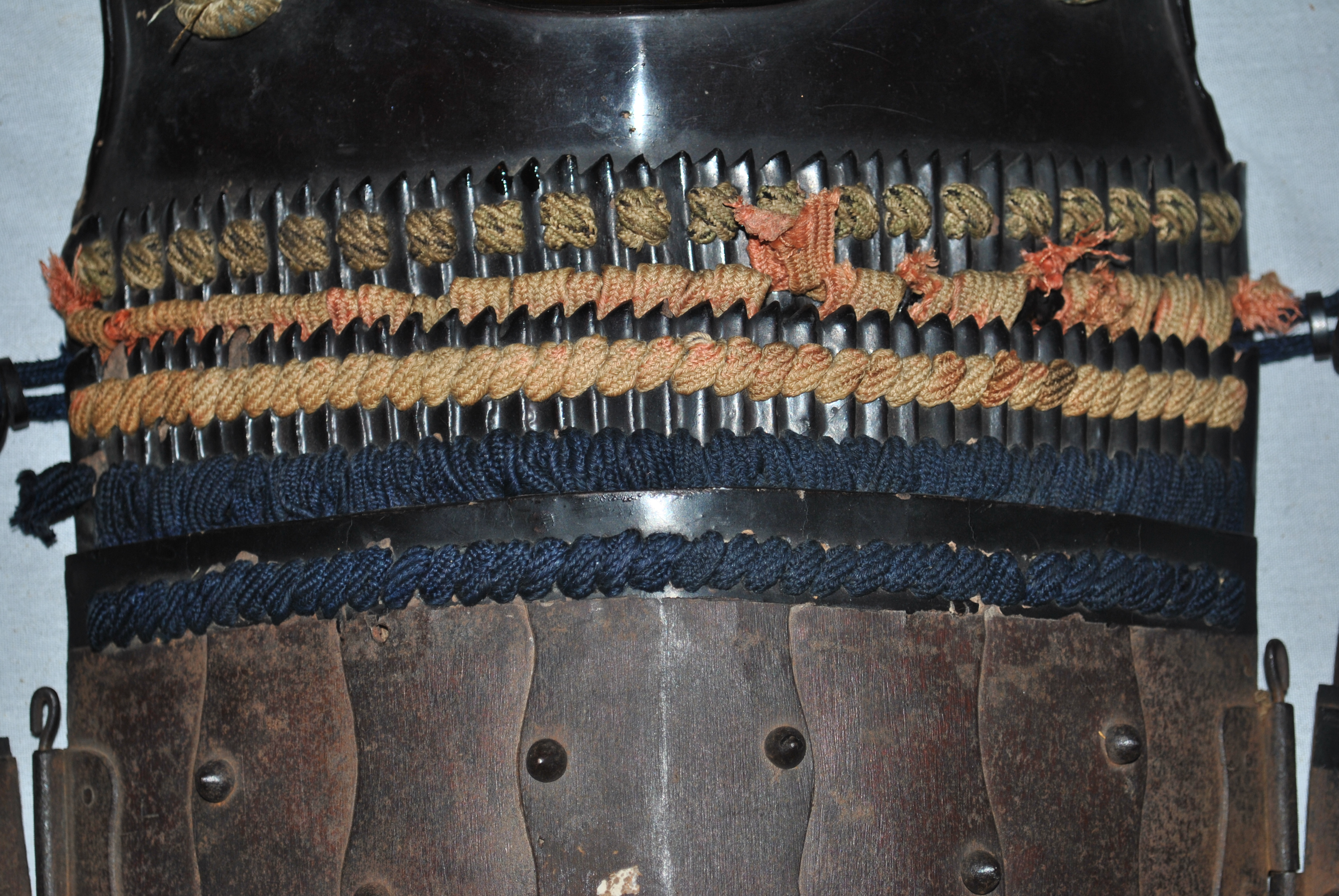
Kiritsuke hon kozane (false/simulated hon kozane)

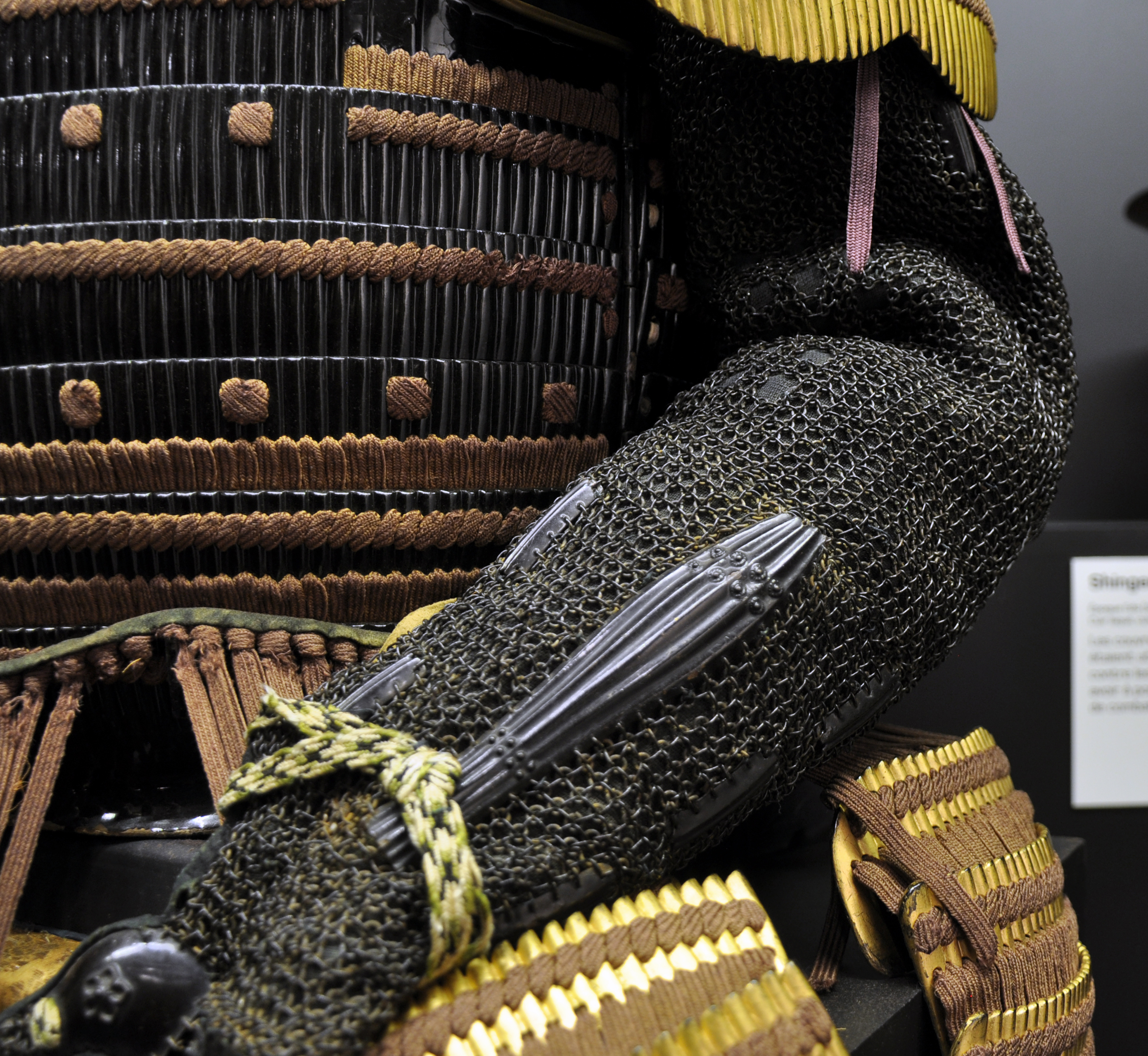
Kiritsuke hon kozane dō (false/simulated hon kozane)

=== Tosei dou (dō) ===
Tosei dou (dō) (tosei meaning modern), were made from iron plates (ita-mono) instead of individual scales (kozane). Tosei-gusoku became prominent starting in the 1500s due to the advent of firearms, new fighting tactics, and the need for additional protection.

- Okegawa Dou (dō) gusoku – (tub-sided), refers to the tub-like shape of the dou (dō). There are two types of okegawa dou (dō): yokohagi (horizontal lames), and tatehagi (vertical lames).
- Hishinui dou (dō) or Hishi-toji dou (dō) – chest armours with rows of prominent cross knots, usually an okegawa dou (dō).
- Munemenui dou (dō) or Unamenui dou (dō) – chest armours with a running stitch that goes horizontally across the surface of the dou (dō). This stitch of lacing runs along the surface of the lame looking like a dotted line paralleling the top.
- Dangae dou (dō) gusoku – meaning "step-changing", a combination of two or more styles.
- Hotoke dou (dō) gusoku – chest armor which is smooth and shows no signs of lames.
- Nio dou (dō) – embossed to resemble the emaciated torso of a starving monk or old man; named in resemblance of the Buddhist deities of the same name.
- Katahada-nugi dou (dō) – embossed to resemble a half-naked torso.
- Yukinoshita or Sendai dou (dō) – A five plate, four hinge (go-mai) chest armor in the sendai or yukinoshita style.
- Hatomune dou (dō) gusoku – (pigeon-breast chest armour or cuirass) were inspired by European peascod breastplate armour. Hatomune dou (dō) have a sharp central ridge running vertically down the front.
- Uchidashi dou (dō) gusoku – Embossed or hammered out relief on the front.
- Nanban dou (dō) gusoku – Armour made on the base of late European armour
- Mōgami dou (dō) – five-plate, four hinge (go mai) chest armours with solid lames which are laced with sugake odoshi instead of being riveted.

==== Tosei dou (dō) gallery ====
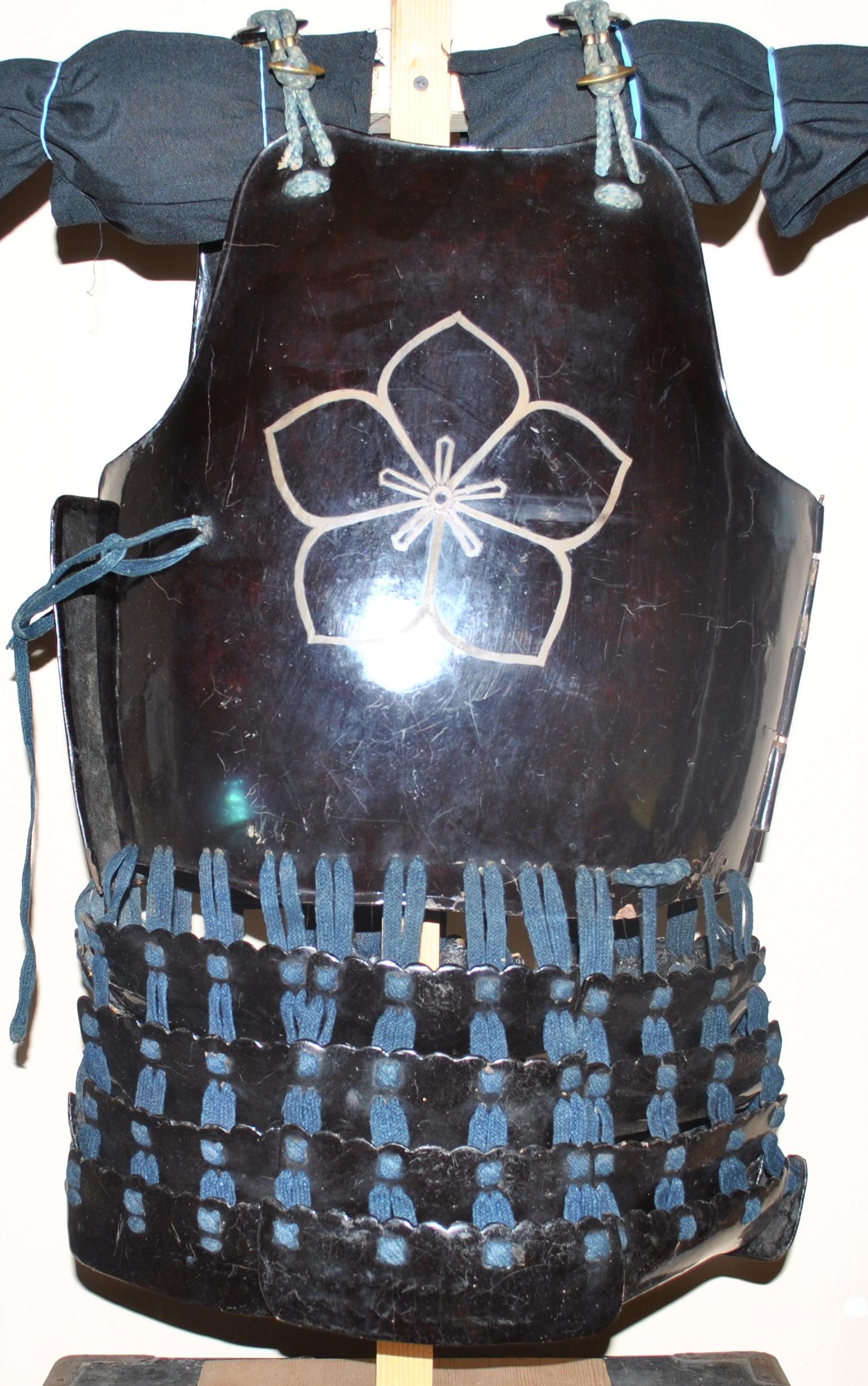
Hotoke dou (dō)

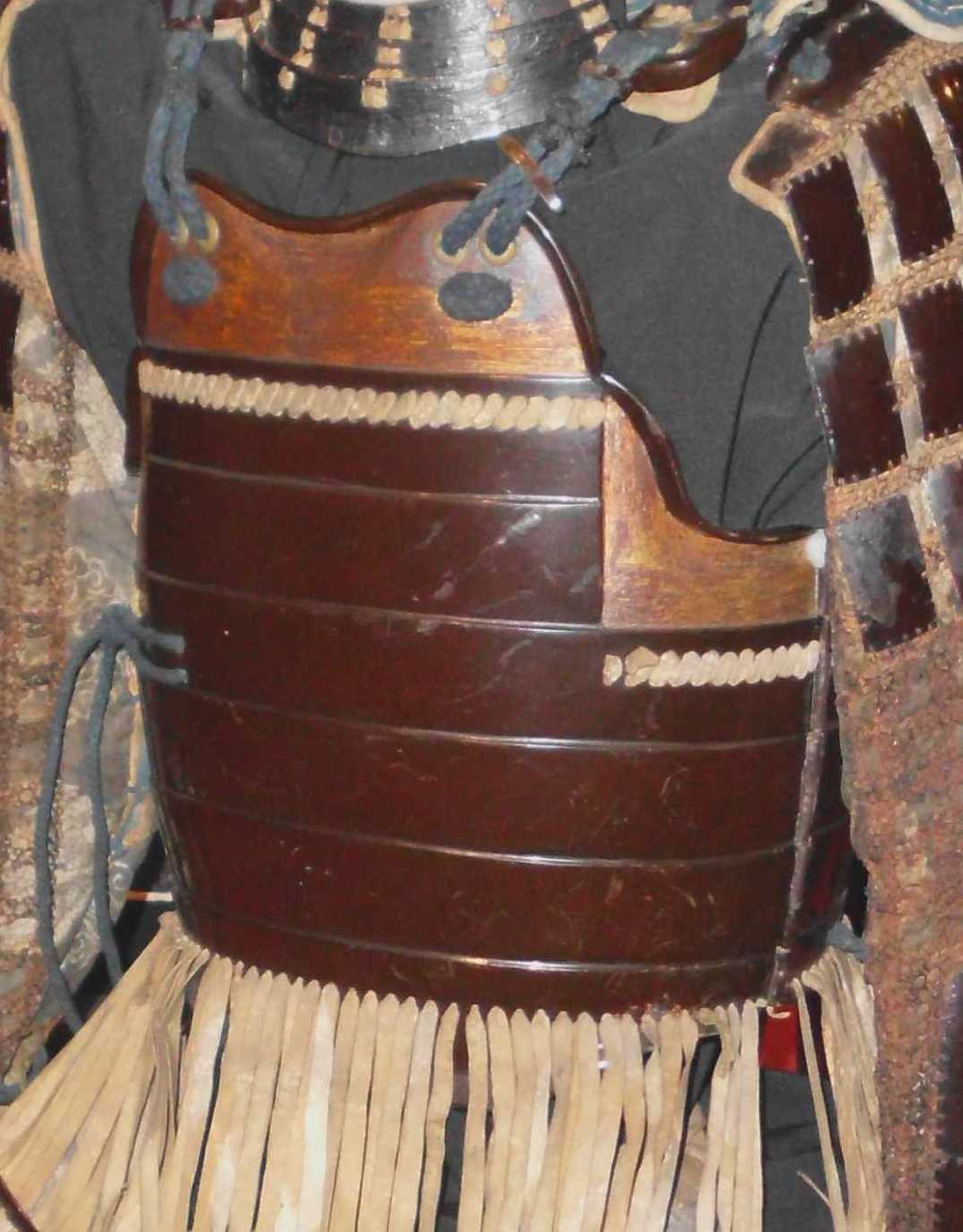
Yokohagi okegawa dou (dō)

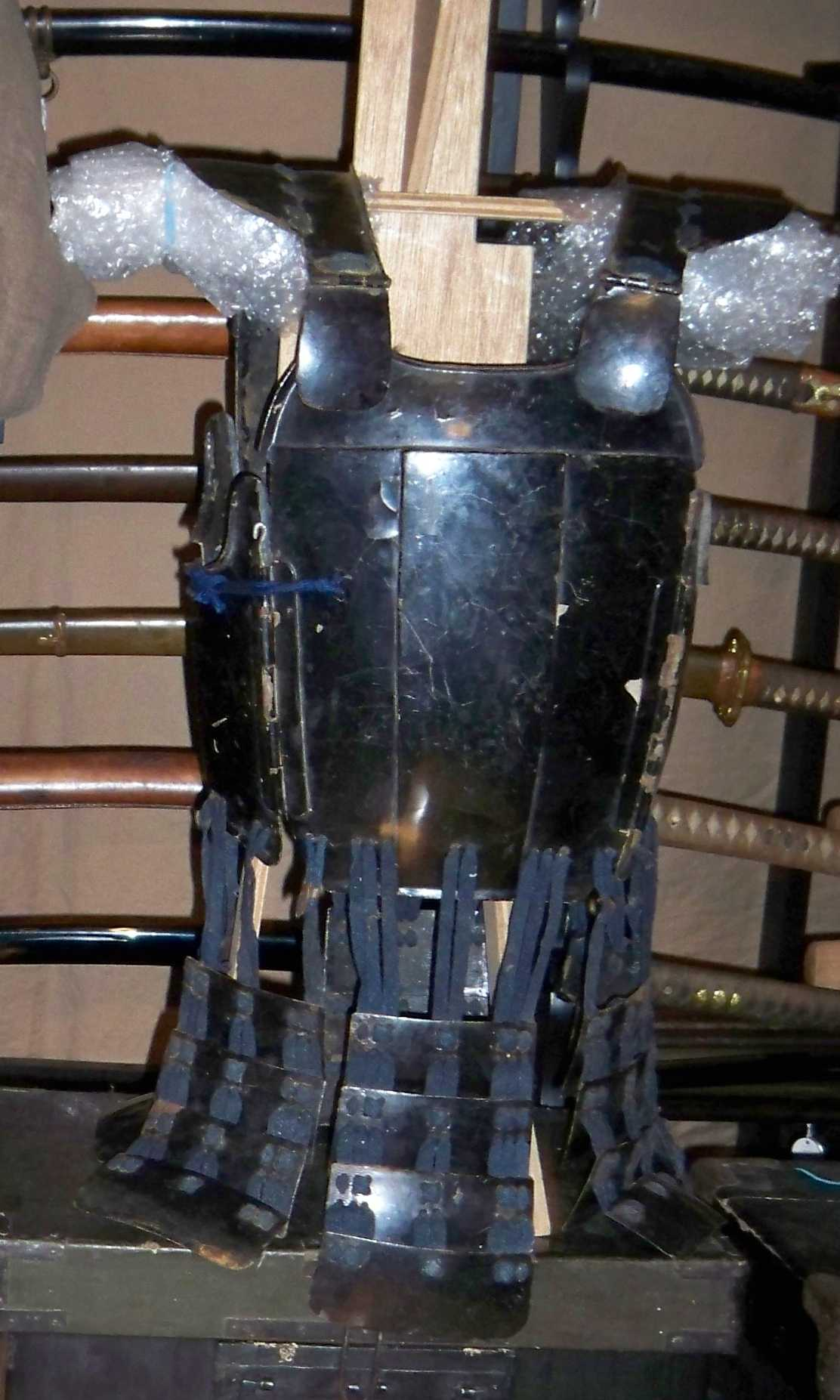
Go-mai sendai or yukinoshita dou. A five plate, four hinge go-mai Japanese (samurai) chest armor in the sendai or yukinoshita style.

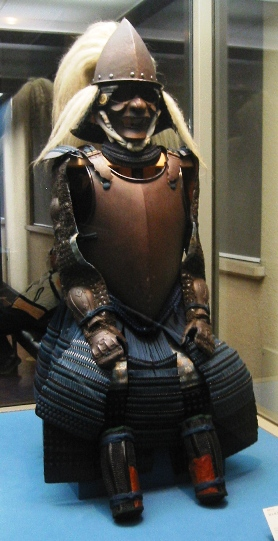
Nanban dou (dō)

=== Tatami dō ===
Tatami dō (folding or foldable) were made from small square or rectangular armour plates (karuta) or hexagon armour plates (kikko) that were usually connected to each other by chain armour (kusari) and sewn to a cloth backing, tatami dō could also be made entirely from kusari. Tatami dou (dō) were lightweight, portable, convenient for transportation, and were manufactured inexpensively and in great numbers for the ashigaru light infantry. Tatami dou (dō) were worn by all samurai classes from the highest class to the lowest class. The higher class samurai wore elaborate tatami dou (dō) while the lower class samurai and retainers wore plainer, simpler designs

==== Types of tatami armour ====
- Karuta tatami dō, karuta, small square or rectangular iron or leather plates linked together by chainmail.
- Kikko tatami dō, kikko, small hexagon iron or leather plates sewn to a cloth backing, the kikko armour can be connected to each other by chain armour (kusari) or by threads.
- Kusari tatami dō, kusari, Japanese chainmail, consisting of links of iron formed in a wide variety of sizes and shapes, connected to each other in various patterns.

==== Tatami dou (dō) gallery ====
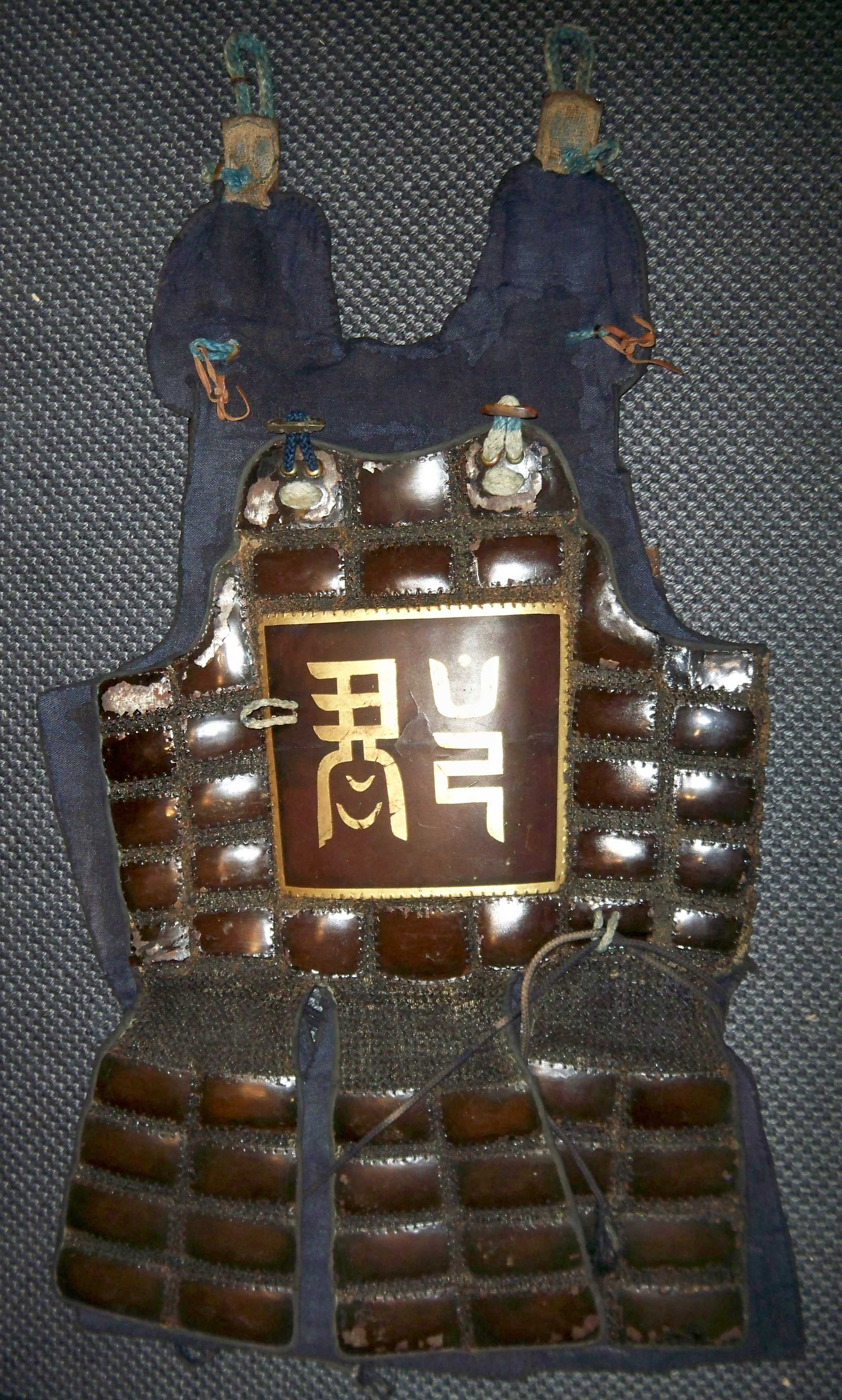
Karuta tatami dō

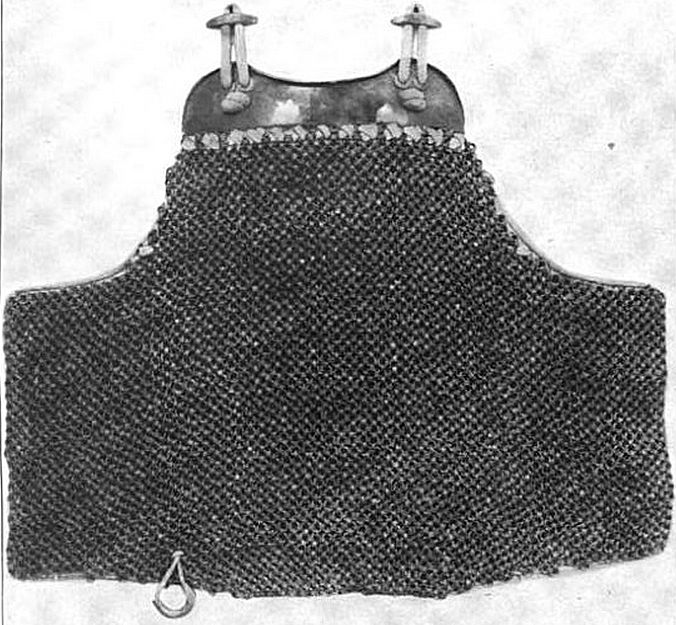
Kusari tatami dō (chain armor cuirass)

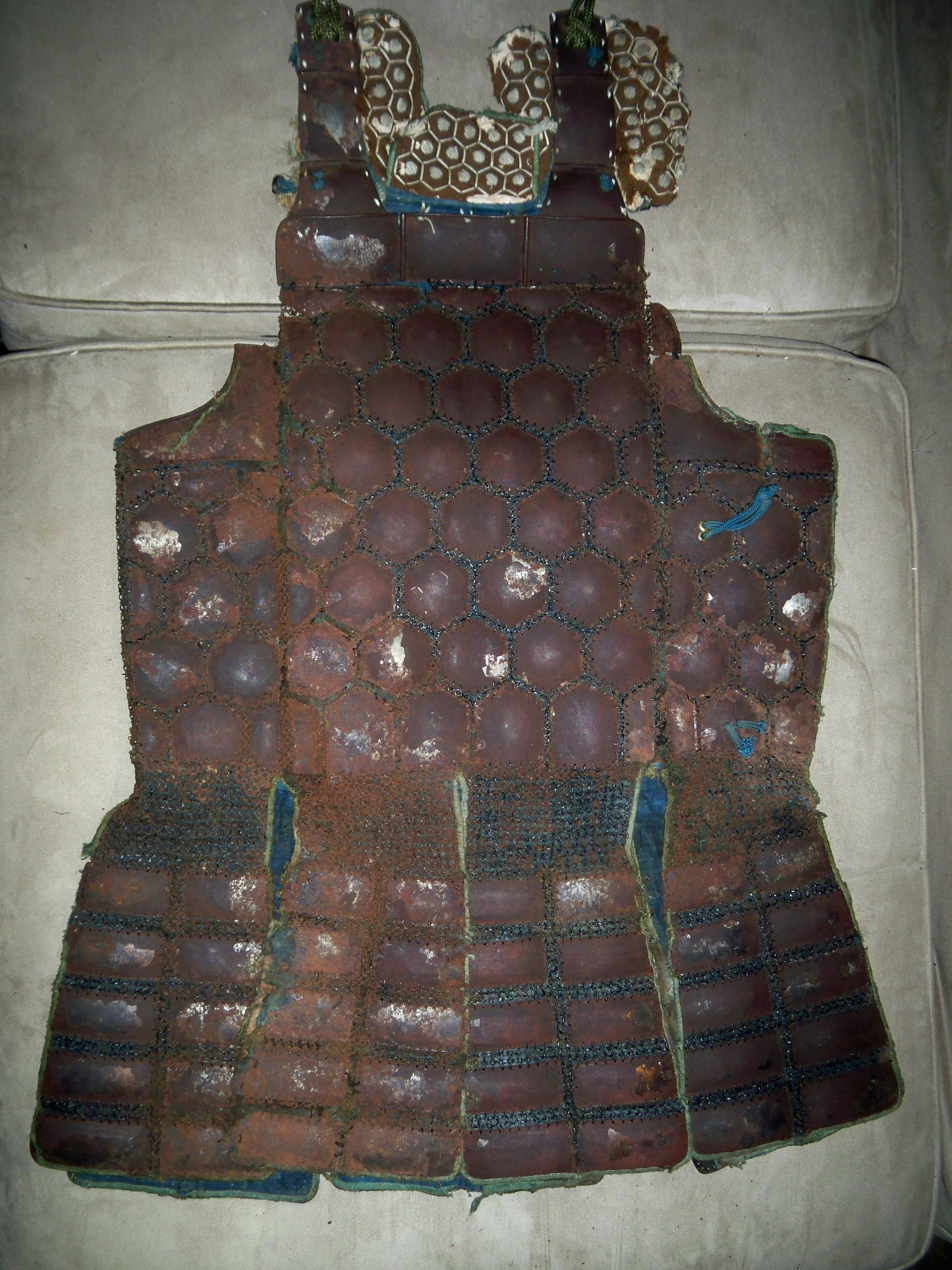
Kikko tatami dō, small hexagon iron plates

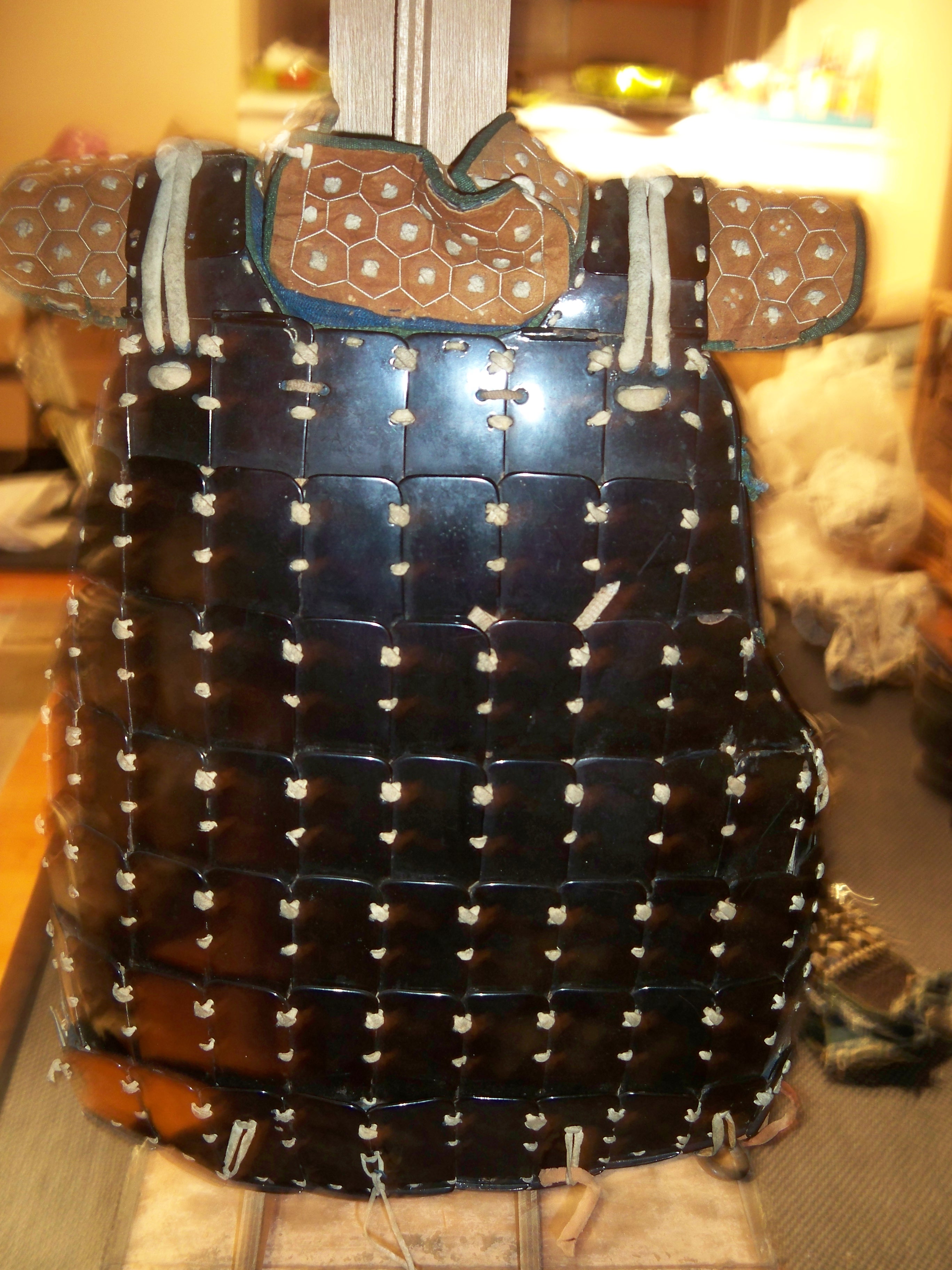
Karuta tatami dō. The karuta armor plates are laced to each other.

==== Tatami armour gallery ====
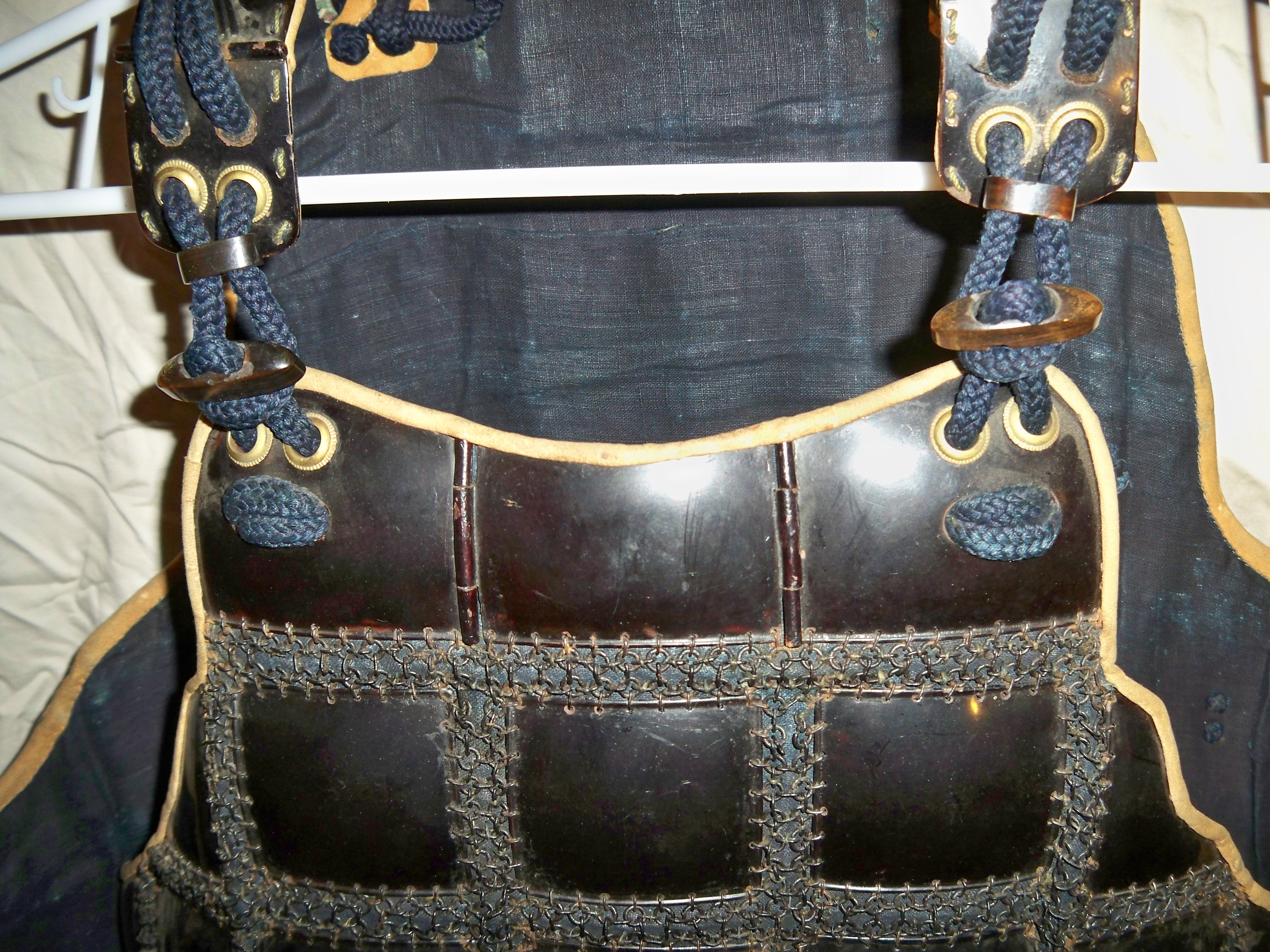
Karuta armour plates

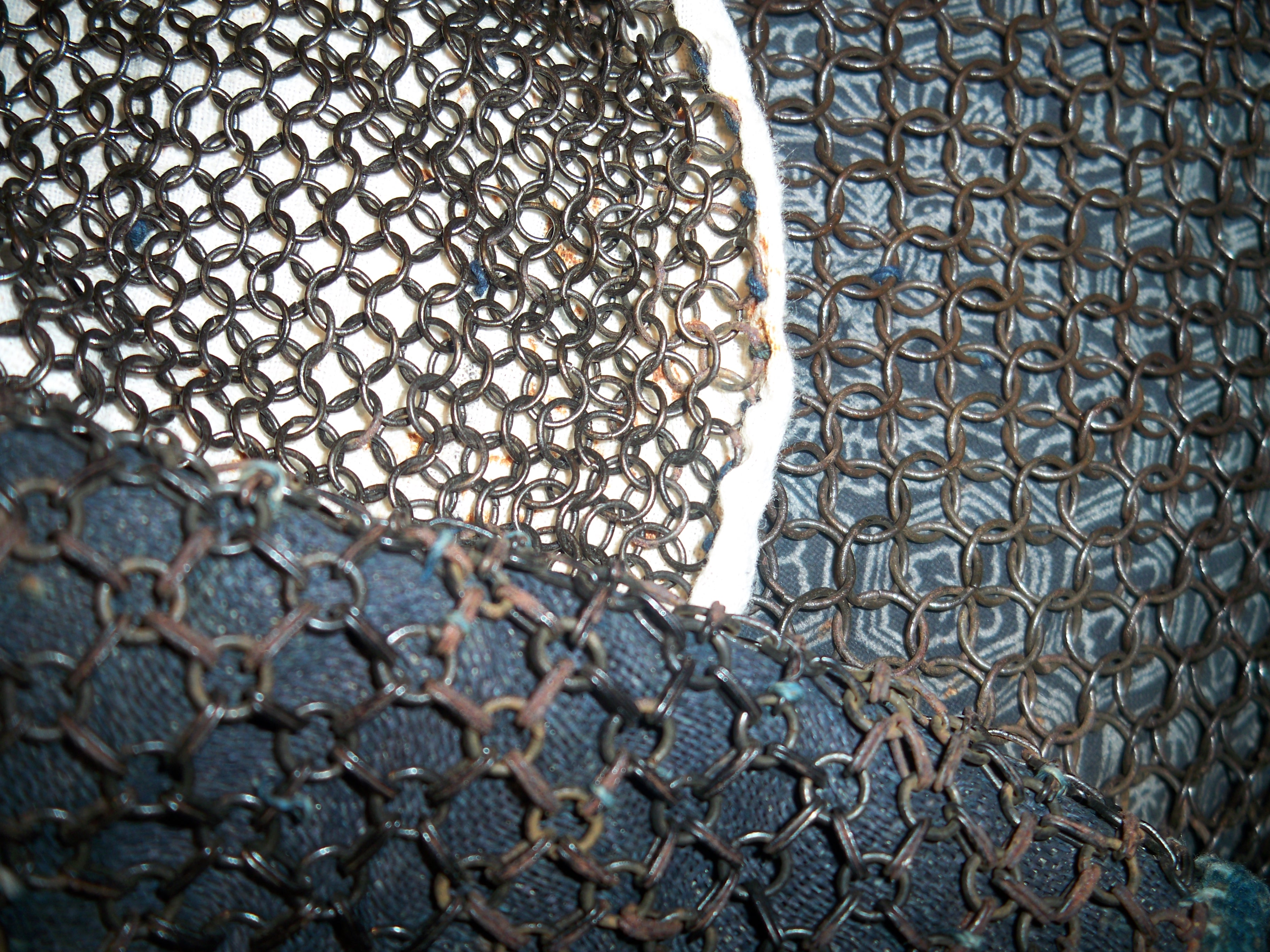
Kusari types

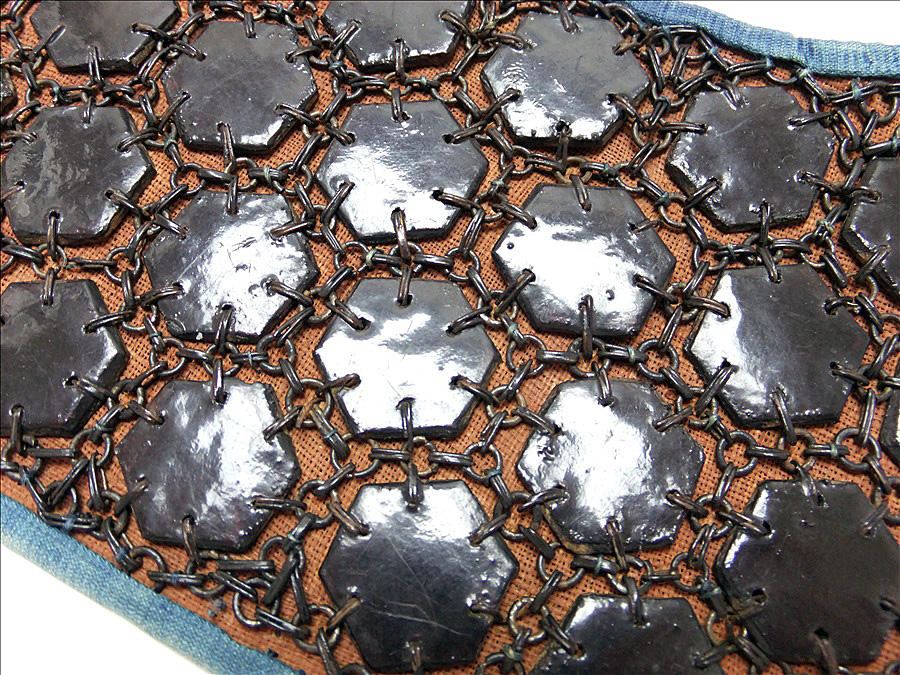
Kikko armor

== See also ==
- Japanese armour
