= Laminar armour =

Type of armour

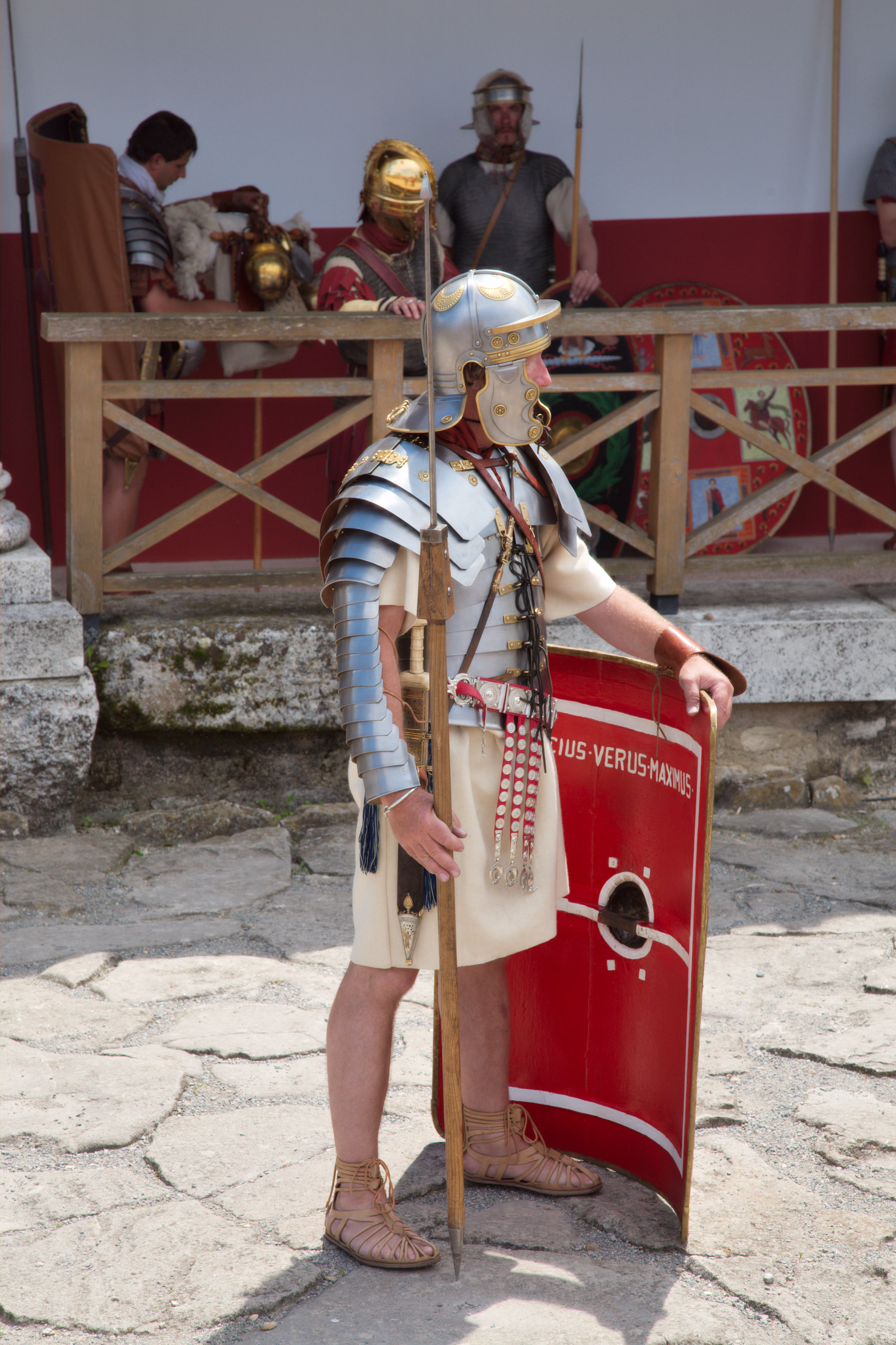
Roman lorica segmentata worn with manica

Laminar armour (from Latin lamina 'layer') is an armour made from horizontal overlapping rows or bands of, usually small, solid armour plates called lames, as opposed to lamellar armour, which is made from individual armour scales laced together to form a solid-looking strip of armour. Prominent examples of such armour are lorica segmentata of Ancient Rome and certain versions of samurai armour.

Less known examples were present in Asia from Iran to Mongolia, including Central Asia and India. Laminar armour from animal skins has also been traditionally made and worn in the Arctic areas of what are now Siberia, Alaska and Canada.

In the 16th century laminar and lamellar armour was superseded by plated mail in the Middle East and Central Asia, remaining mainly in Mongolia. However, laminar armour did appear briefly in some form in Europe during the 16th to the 17th century with the main feature that distinguished it from other forms of laminar armour being the metal strips being fastened using sliding rivets. This was known as anima and was invented in Italy. Notable examples include the Earl of Pembroke's Armour and the armour worn by the Polish hussars. The technique was also used create segmented armour to protect the neck, upper limbs, and hips as seen in the Almain rivet, the zischagge, falling buffe, and faulds.

== Medieval laminar armour ==
=== Japanese laminar armour ===
Laminar cuirasses were manufactured in Japan as early as the 4th century.Tankō (laminar), worn by foot soldiers and keikō (lamellar), worn by horsemen were both pre-samurai types of early Japanese cuirass constructed from iron plates connected by leather thongs.

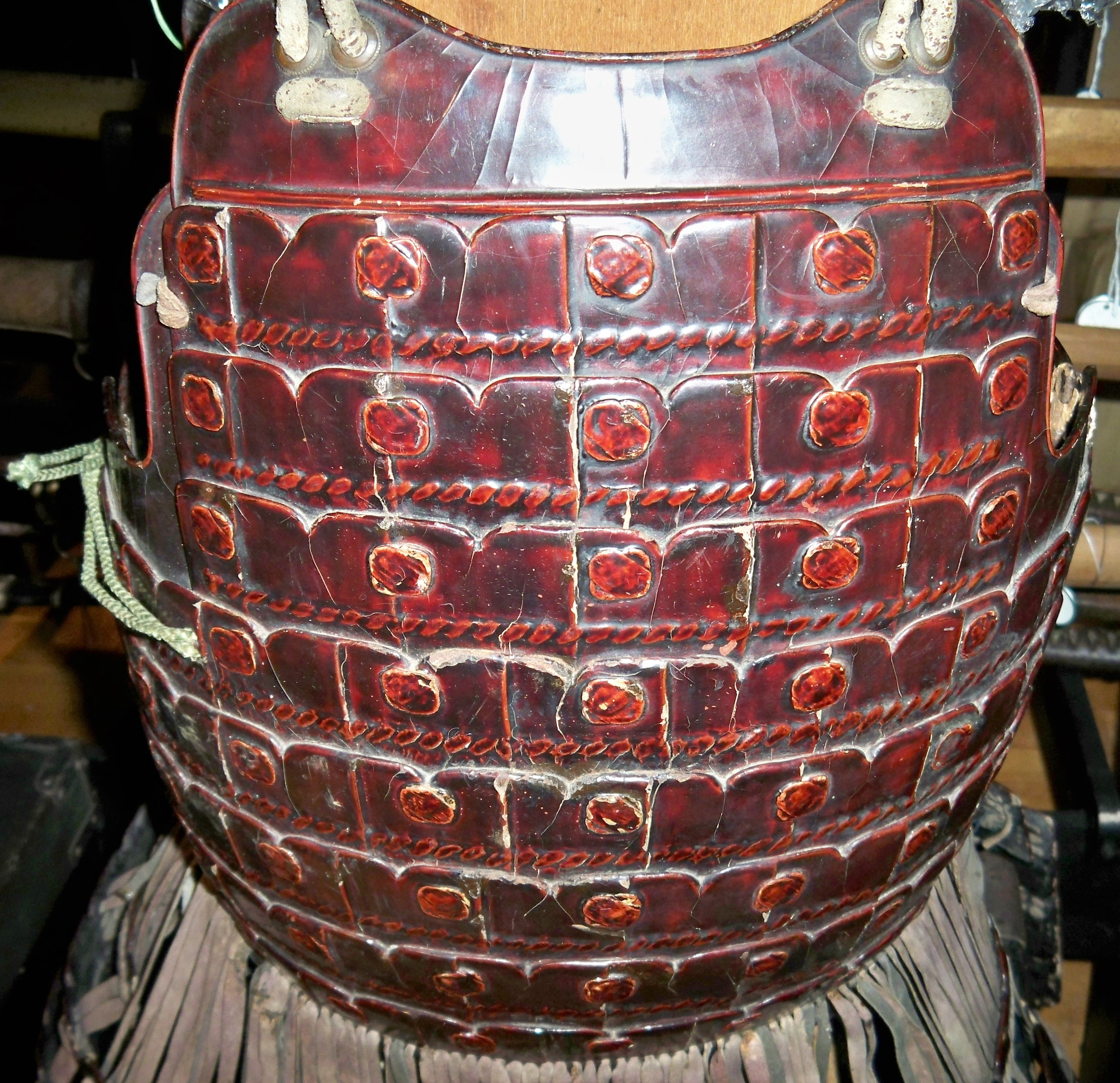
Kiritsuke iyozane dō (laminar cuirass), constructed with horizontal rows (bands) of armor plates laced together in a manner that simulates the scales (kozane) of lamellar armor.

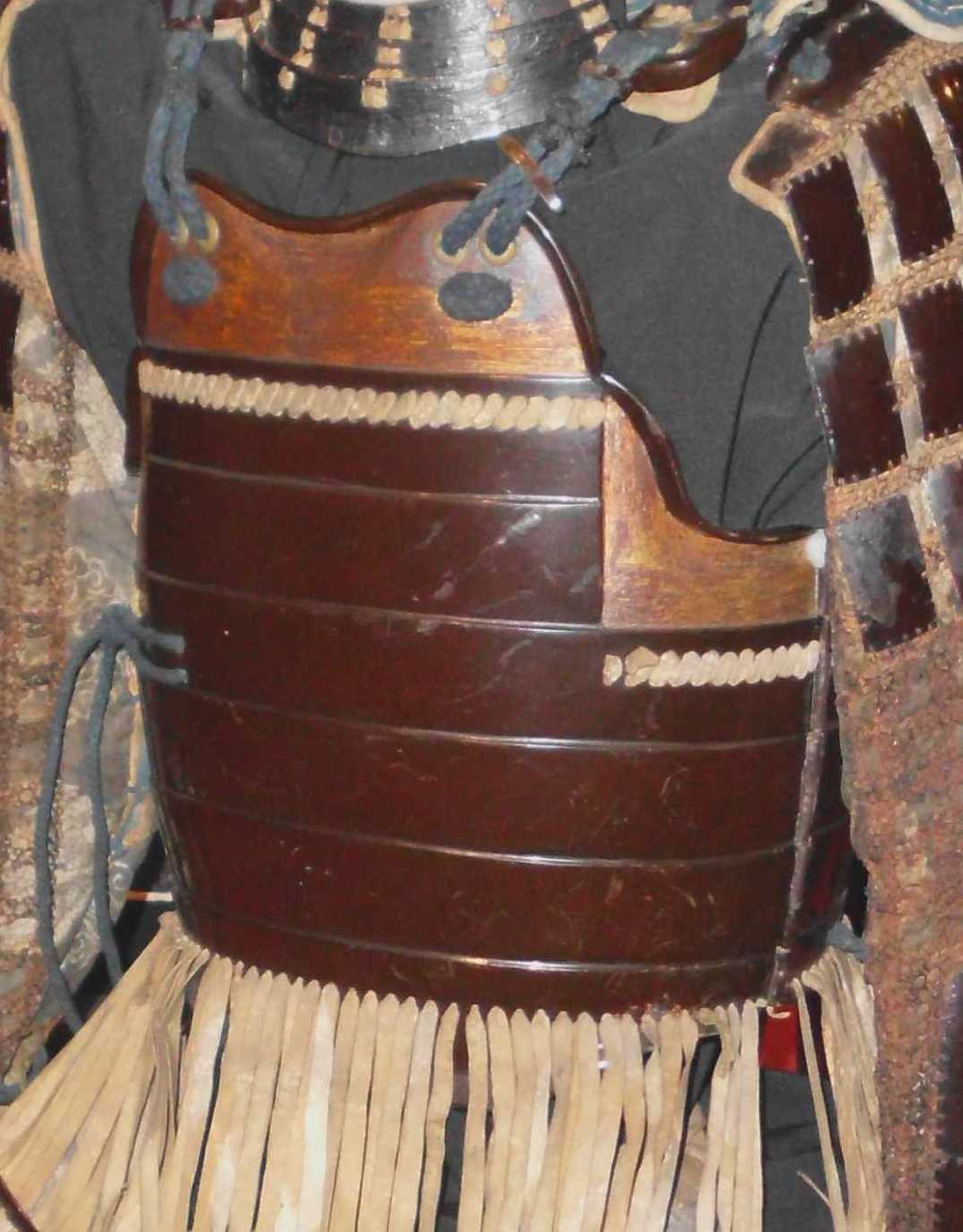
Okegawa dō constructed with horizontal rows (bands) of iron plates riveted together with no lacing being used at all, this type of armour was the beginning of plate armour development in Japanese armour.

At the beginning of the Sengoku period Japanese armour typically had two versions – expensive and inexpensive. The difference was that expensive versions were made from hundreds or even thousands of individual leather and or iron scales laced together into armor strips (lamellar), this was a very time-consuming process. The two most common types of scales which made up the Japanese lamellar armors were hon kozane which were constructed from narrow or small scales, and hon iyozane which were constructed from wider scales.

Laminar armor proved to be inexpensive and easier to construct, although was often made to look like simulated lamellar plates. This is known as Kiritsuke iyozane. Kiritsuke iyozane is a form of laminar armor constructed from long strips of leather and or iron which were perforated, laced, and notched and made to replicate the look of real lamellar plates. These strips of simulated lamellar plates were much more rigid than real lamellar and they were assembled into armor items in the same way that the rows of lamellar armour were.

After about a century of the ceaseless civil war during the Sengoku period simulated lamellar plates and true lamellar plates become less popular as plate armor started to be used more frequently. The laminar cuirass evolved to become the okegawa dō, constructed of horizontal strips of armour joined not by laces, but by rivets or staples (imitating laces).

=== Middle East and Central Asian laminar armour ===
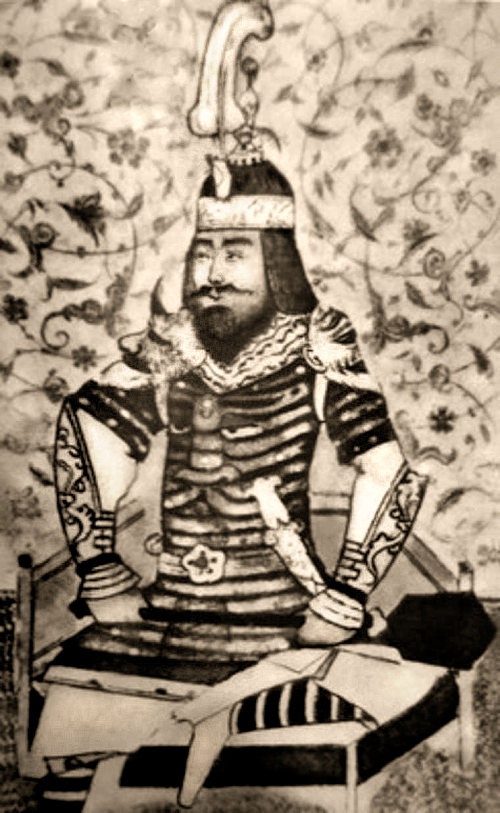
The armour of Timur showing a mix of Middle eastern and Central asian elements

According to Bobrov, until the end of the 15th century the most popular armour in certain regions including Central Asia and Persia was lamellar armour, brigandines, and laminar armour. However, in Iran since the 15th century lamellar and laminar armour were typical only in the south, while during the 15th century the typical armour in the north was plated mail.

Initially for centuries laminar armour was just a less expensive version of lamellar armor. Laminar was just made from horizontal strips of armour laced like strips of lamellar plates, but without extra-lacing and notches imitating strips of lamellar armour. And like in lamellar armour these laces could be occasionally cut during battle; the laces also frayed when an armour was worn for long periods without being mended.

Later at the beginning of the 15th century construction of laminar armour had significantly changed; instead of lacing being used, strips of new laminar armour were riveted to broad straps (like in lorica segmentata). As a result, laminar armour became more reliable than lamellar armour: hidden straps couldn't be cut without the armour being penetrated, the broad straps did not require continuous mending, and the straps were stiffer and more durable than the thinner lacing that was used previously. Laminar armour eventually became more popular than lamellar armour, and almost fully replaced lamellar armour by the end of 15th century.

Pure lamellar armour became very rare; however, different combinations of laminar and lamellar armour were very popular. This happened because even though laminar armour was much more reliable than lamellar, laminar armour was not flexible enough, while lamellar armours were very flexible. Laminar cuirasses could be worn with lamellar pauldrons and tassets (worn with separate bracers, greaves and helm). Less common was the opposite combination of lamellar cuirass worn with laminar pauldrons and tassets. Both could be optionally worn with lamellar or laminar cod-piece and loin-guard, or even with mirror plate reinforcement.

At the end of 15th century, when laminar armour became much more popular than lamellar ones, both armour types began to be replaced by plated mails. Initially plated mail was made only as cuisses, but soon by the beginning of 16th century plated mail was utilized in both pauldrons and cuisses, as they could better envelop body and fully replaced laminar and lamellar pauldron and tassets. So a typical laminar armour of that period was just a laminar cuirass which could be worn over brigandine with sleeves supplemented by plated mail cuisses. (Helm, bracers and greaves are not mentioned here as they were conventional for that region). Sleeves of brigandine worked as pauldron, and if a brigandine was long enough its laps could work as tassets. Another option was wearing a laminar cuirass without any brigandine, but with plated mail pauldrons and cuisses. Both variations of laminar armour could be re-enforced by mirror plate (even though laminar armour would have been enough protection from steel weapons, a metal mirror was worn as protection from the "evil eye"). Finally by the end of the 16th century laminar and lamellar armour practically disappeared in the Middle East and Central Asia regions.

== Laminar armour of native peoples of Bering Strait region ==
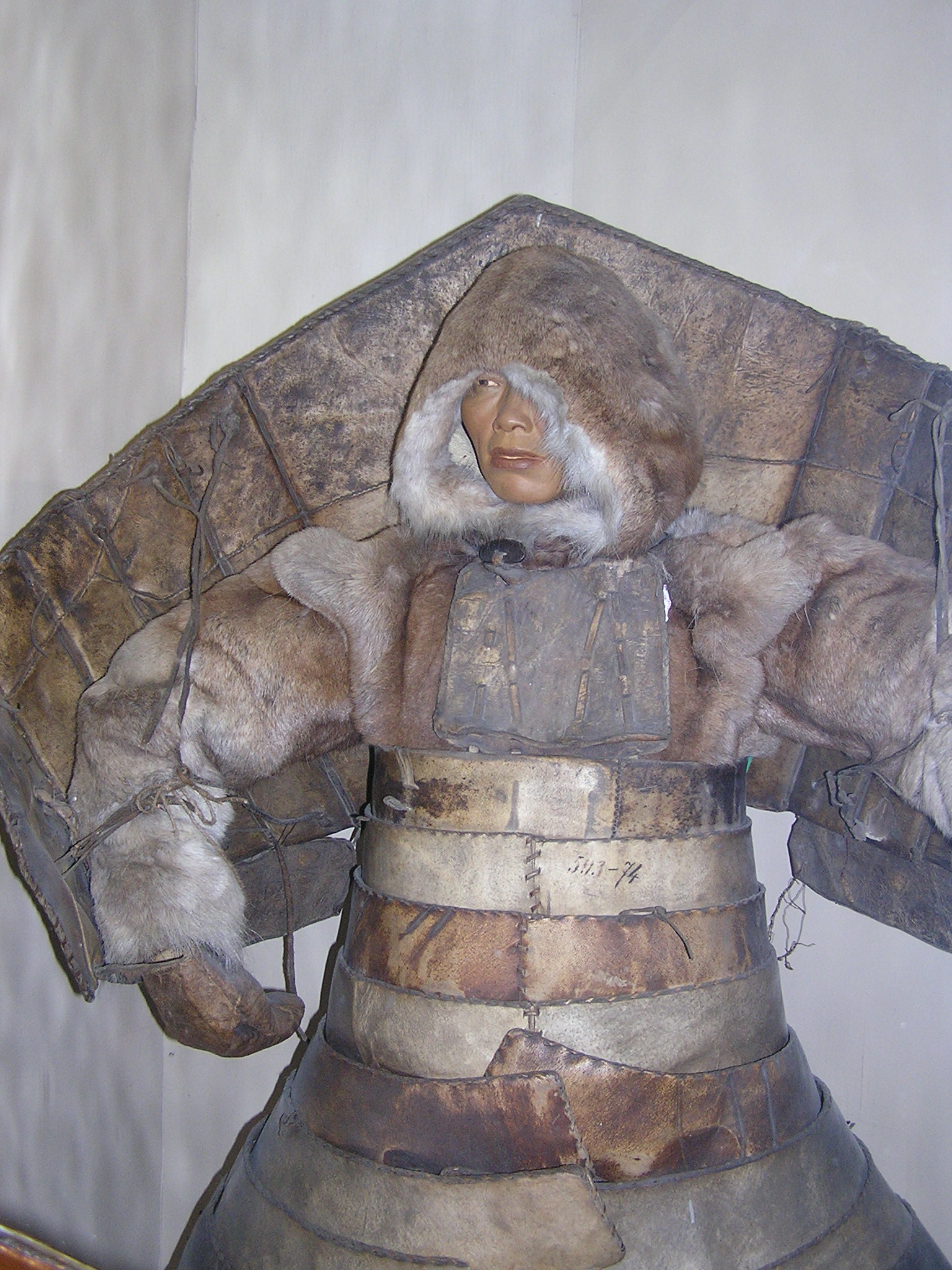
Laminar armour from hardened leather reinforced by wood and bones such as this is worn by native Siberians

Armour of Chukchi and Siberian Yupik had very similar construction, also used by the Tlingit. According to different sources, Chukchi armour could have only one enormous pauldron extending to the waist, used as a shield, and looking rather like a wing or had both "wings". Both Chukchi and Yupik armour could have lamellar or laminar constructions unlike other regions were lamellar and laminar armour typically had different construction and were made from different materials. Similar lamellar armour with "wing" pauldrons was used by Koryak people.

Classic lamellar armour was made from hard materials (initially from natural materials like bone, tusk, baleen, and even wood as arrow-heads initially were from bone or stone) and in the shape of a short cuirass or even consisted only of a breast-plate. While laminar armour was made from hardened seal leather and often knee long, or even longer. However late lamellar armour made from metal (iron or steel or even brass) and could be as long as laminar armour. Both lamellar and laminar armour usually were worn with a high collar (protecting neck and head) integral with one or two laminar pauldrons (used rather as shield than ordinary pauldron). This collar and its pauldrons usually were made from leather and wood.

Usually at least one part of an armour (a pauldron) was laminar, but sometimes a pauldron was comparatively "short" and instead of being laminar constructed from a few wooden planks it instead used only one big plank, and the rest of the hand was protected by splinted or lamellar vambrace. Besides optional vambraces an armour could optionally have a lamellar helm, and splinted or lamellar greaves.

== See also ==
- Lamellar armour
- Banded mail
- Plated mail
- Mirror armour
