= Earl of Pembroke (disambiguation) =

Earl of Pembroke is a title in the Peerage of England.

It may also refer to:

- Earl of Pembroke, tall ship
- HMS Endeavour, launched as the collier Earl of Pembroke
- Earl of Pembroke's Men, Elizabethan-era playing company
- Earl of Pembroke's Armour, suit of armour currently at the Royal Ontario Museum
