= Banded mail =

Neologism for a type of armour

"Banded mail" is a neologism, coined in the 19th century, describing a type of composite armour formed by combining the concepts behind the Roman lorica segmentata with splint armour. Its historicity is doubtful. It has become entrenched in the popular consciousness as a result of its inclusion in the armour list for Dungeons & Dragons.

== Terminology ==
Confusion arises because of the wide variety of terms by which similar armours are known. Banded mail has been described as "a form of mail reinforced with bands of leather", as "overlapping horizontal strips of laminated metal sewn over a backing of normal chain mail [sic] and soft leather backing" and as "many thin sheets of metal are hammered or riveted together". The last description more closely fits splinted armour, which consists of long metal splints connected by mail/leather used for arm and leg protection. The final description of metal plates riveted to a sub-strate describe a coat of plates or brigandine, all of which consist of metal plates riveted to a leather or cloth fronting. Finally, armour constructed of rows of plates or platelets sewn or laced together, without backing/fronting, would be considered "laminar". Another source described banded mail as a type of armour that consists of "alternate rows of leather or cotton and a single chain mail [sic]". It was also referred to as a kind of mail featuring leather thongs threaded through every or every alternate row of links.

The current term for small metal plates joined by mail is plated mail.

== History ==
Although banded mail was considered real during the 19th century, later books on history claim that banded mail arose due to a misinterpretation of medieval manuscripts and tomb effigies.

While there have been some attempts at modern reconstructions of banded mail, there are no known historic examples. Existing manuscript and effigy representation has generally been interpreted as covering a variety of methods for depicting chainmail. However, Charles ffoulkes claimed that banded mail did exist, pointing specifically to an illustration in the Romance of Alexander where the depiction of mail changes on different parts of the same illustration. He asserted that banded mail was simply chainmail with leather thongs threaded through, and suggested that no specimen survives because the leather would have disintegrated between the armour's heyday in the 13th century and today, leaving conventional chainmail.

== See also ==
- Laminar armour - a historical armour from horizontal strips of plate.
