= Lame (armor) =

Piece of sheet metal used as part of armor in the Middle age

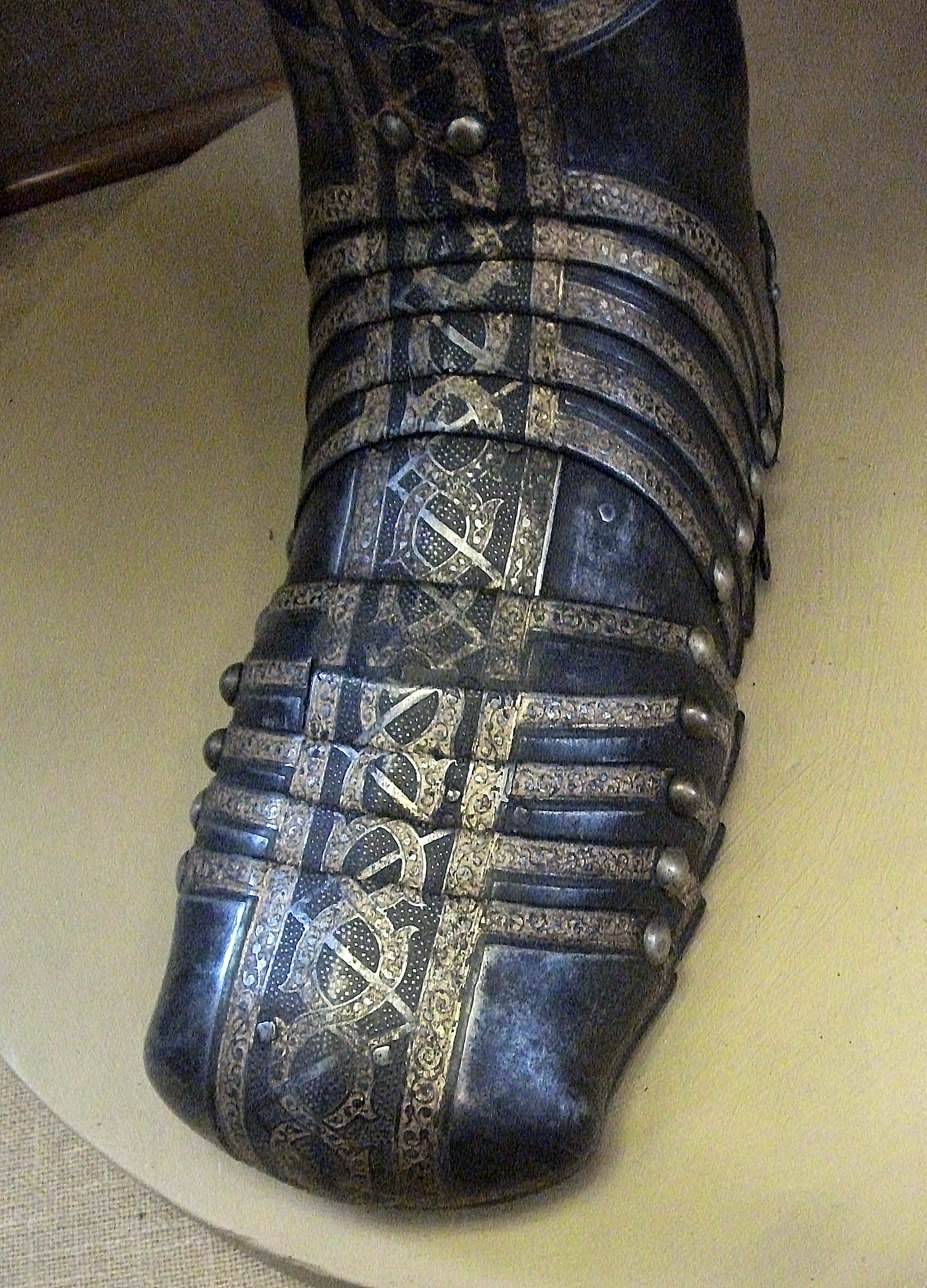
English-made Greenwich armour sabaton, 1587–89

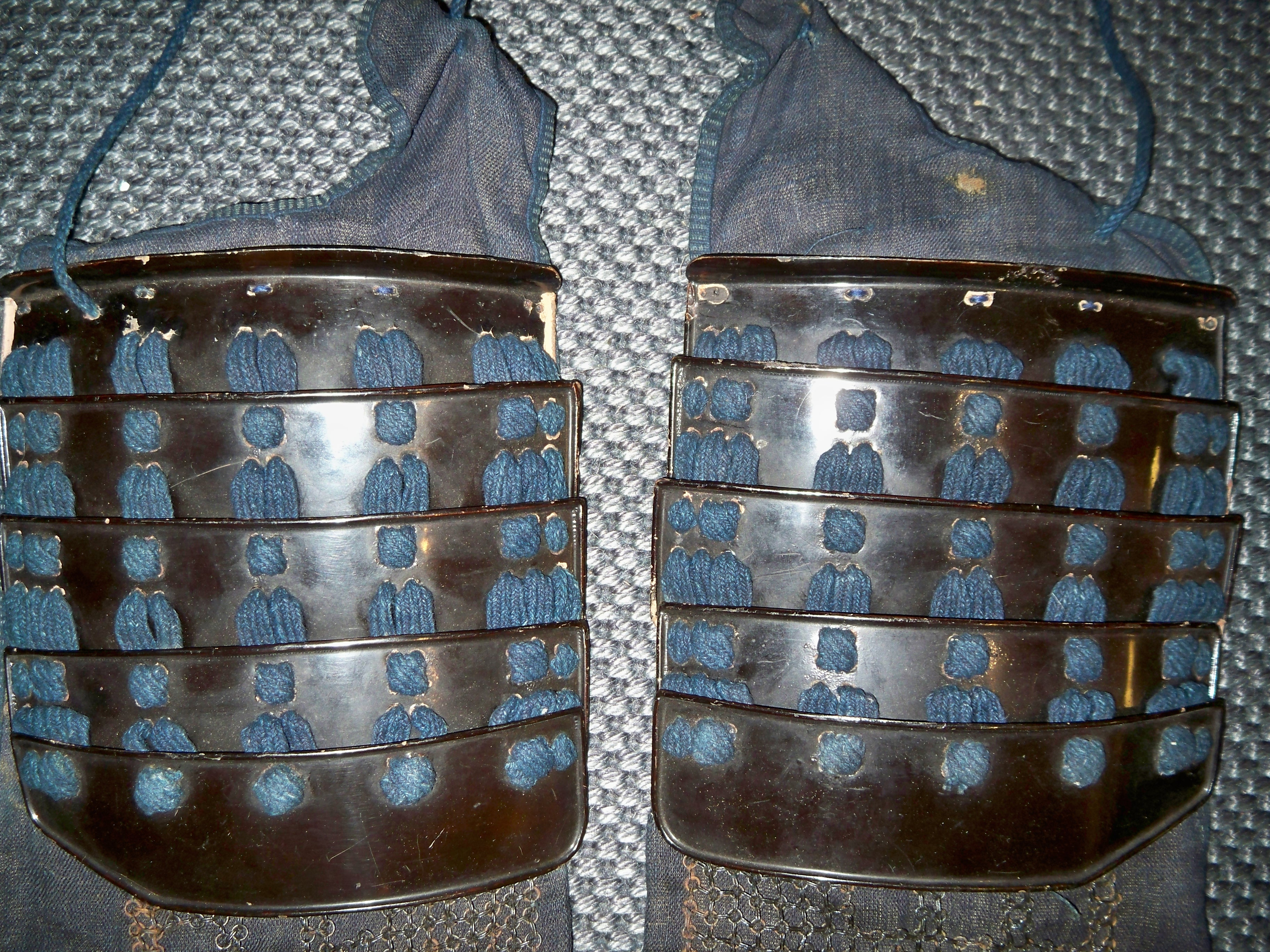
Antique Japanese (samurai) sode (shoulder guards), showing the individual lames connected to each other by silk lacing (odoshi)

A lame is a solid piece of sheet metal used as a component of a larger section of plate armor used in Europe during the medieval period. It is used in armors to provide articulations or the joining of the armor elements. The size is usually small with a narrow and rectangular shape. Multiple lames are riveted together or connected by leather straps or cloth lacing to form an articulated piece of armor that provides flexible protection. The armor worn by the samurai class of feudal Japan used lames in the construction of many of their individual armor parts. The Japanese term is ita, which can both refer to the lame or its borderings.

== Examples ==
Lames are used most often within laminar armour. Precursors to small-plate forms of body armor have existed since prehistory. Notable examples of the usage of lames would be that of the Parade Armour of Henry II of France, and later the field armor of Henry VIII.

The Dos Aguas armor produced in Valencia, Spain, is another example of a plate armor made of lames. The tassets are composed of three lames, with the inner edge of each turned out at right angles. The design provided the armor strength due to the continuous arch-shaped flange. The Schott-Sonnenberg style produced in Nuremberg also featured a three-lame skirt. The tassets are also composed of lames riveted to the lower lame of the fauld.

== See also ==
- Lamellar armour
- Laminar armour
- Scale armour
