= Vambrace =

Armour protecting the forearm and elbow

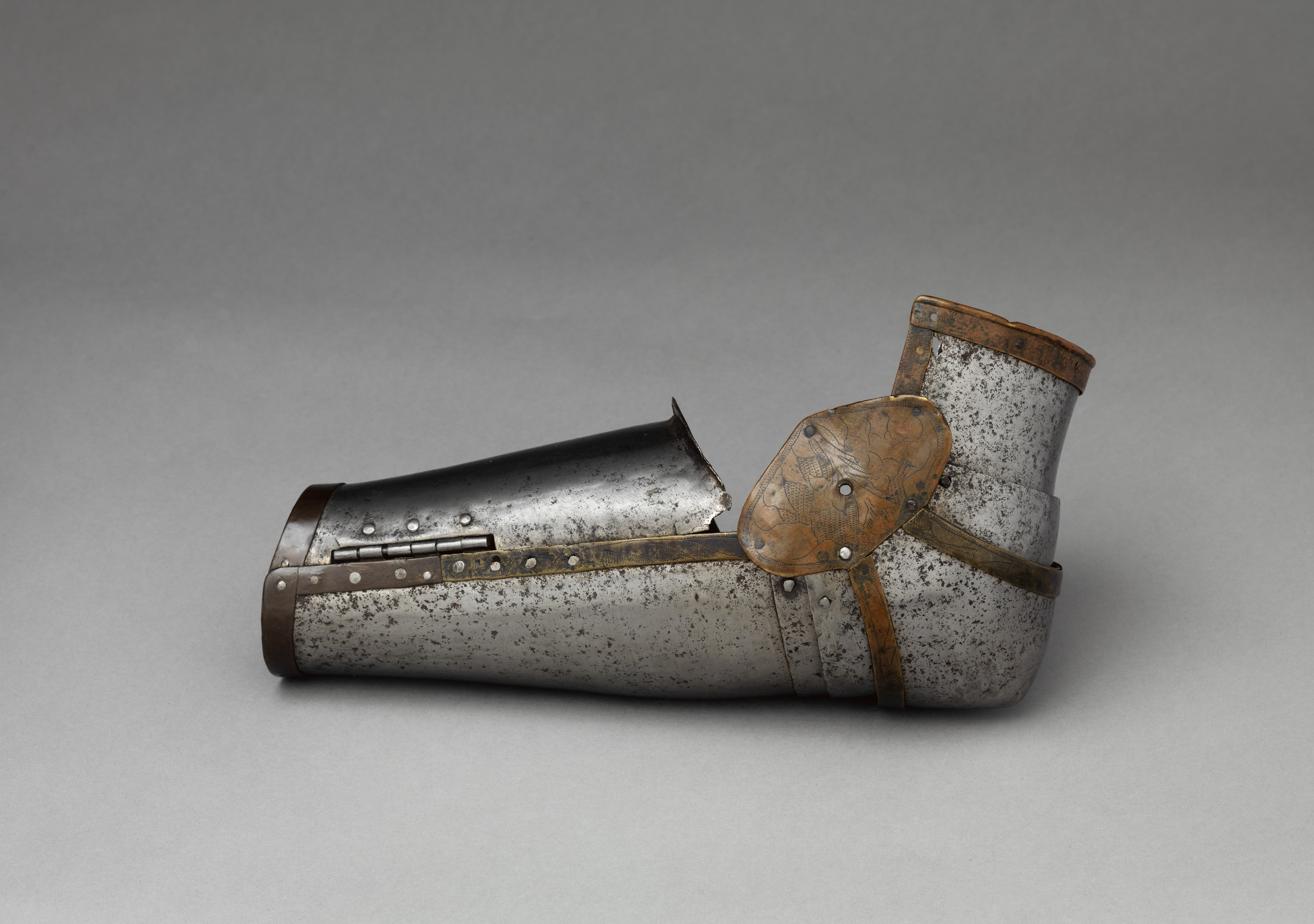
A left-arm vambrace; the bend would be placed at the knight's elbow

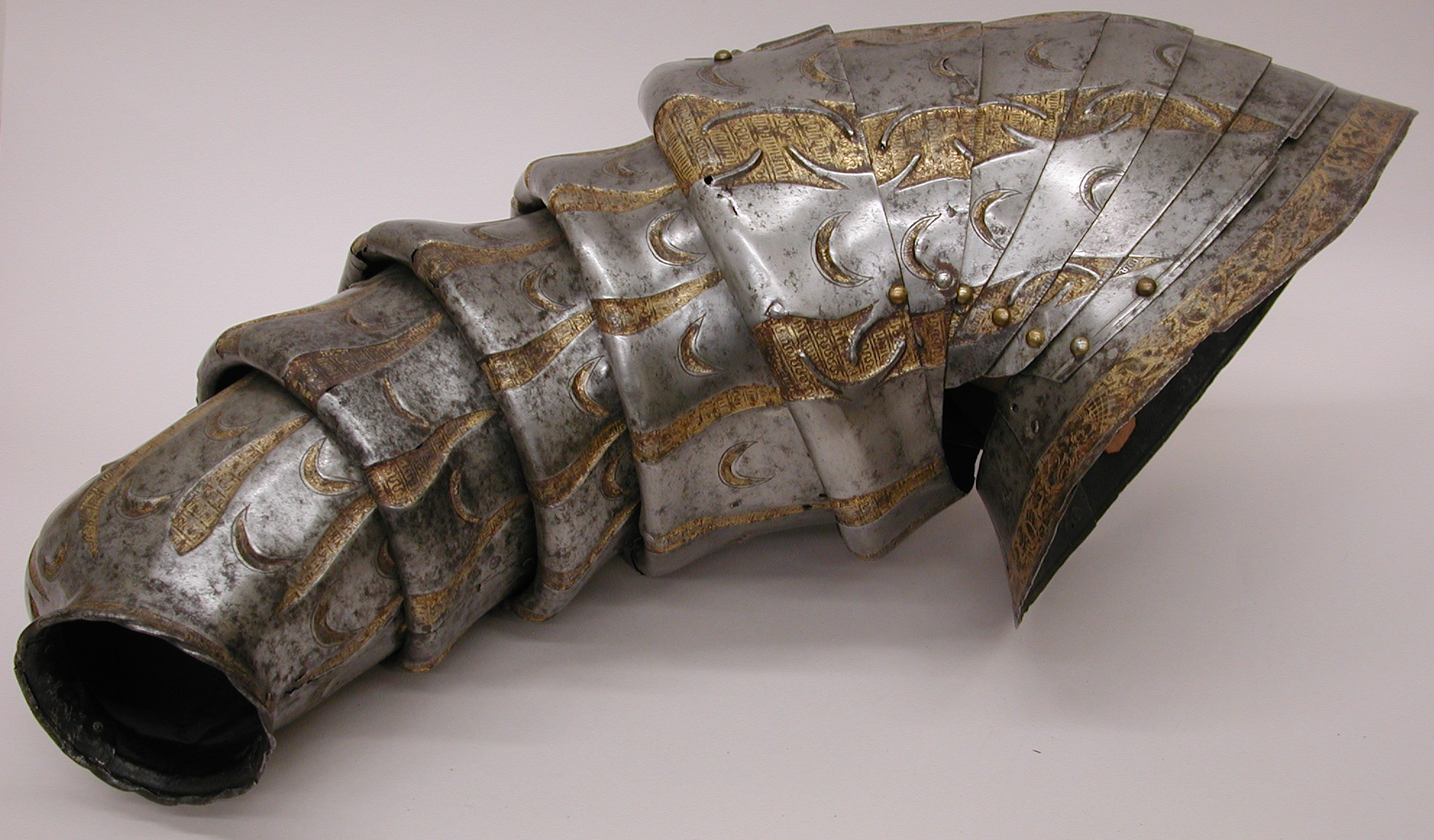
An ornate German (16th century) vambrace made for Costume Armor

Vambraces (French: avant-bras, sometimes known as lower cannons in the Middle Ages) or forearm guards are tubular or gutter defences for the forearm worn as part of a suit of plate armour that were often connected to gauntlets. Vambraces may be worn with or without separate couters in a full suit of medieval armour. The term originates in the early 14th century. They were made from either boiled leather or steel. Leather vambraces were sometimes reinforced with longitudinal strips of hardened hide or metal, creating splinted armour. Sometimes vambraces were decorated with extravagant designs as was customary for nobles during the late Middle Ages.

== See also ==
- Bracer – Protection for an archer's bow-arm
- Gauntlet – Hand and wrist armour
- Manica – Piece of armor
