= Splint armour =

Armour consisting of strips of metal

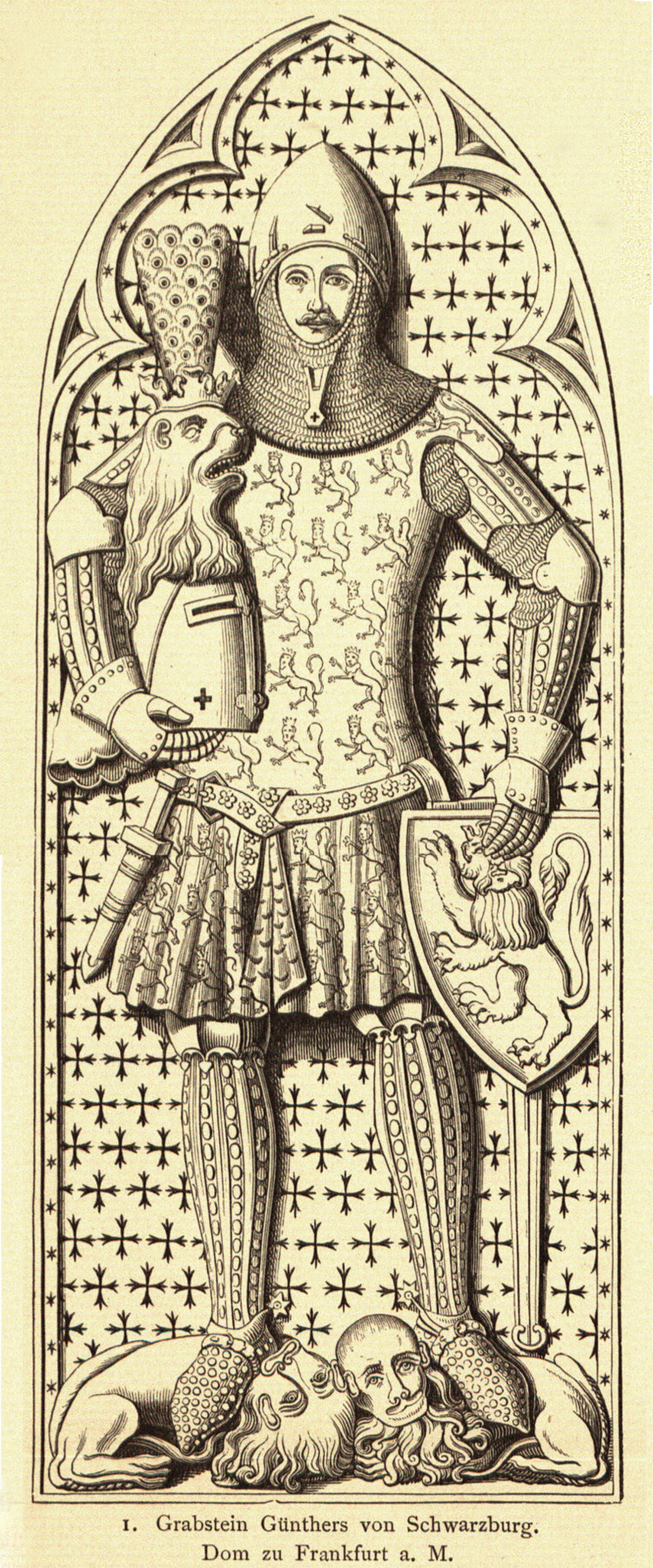
German King Günther von Schwarzburg with splinted bracers and greaves

Splint armour (also splinted armour, splint armor, or splinted armor) is armour consisting of strips of metal ("splints") attached to a cloth or leather backing. It is most commonly found as limb armour such as greaves or vambraces.

== Description ==
Limb armour consisting of strips of metal ("splints") are attached to a fabric (cloth or leather) backing ("foundation"). The splints are narrow metal strips arranged longitudinally, pierced for riveting or sewing to the foundation. Splint armour is most commonly found as greaves or vambraces.

It first appears in a Scythian grave from the 4th century BC then in the Swedish Migration Era; and again in the 14th century as part of transitional armour, where it was also used to form cuisses and rerebraces.

== Splint mail/splinted mail ==
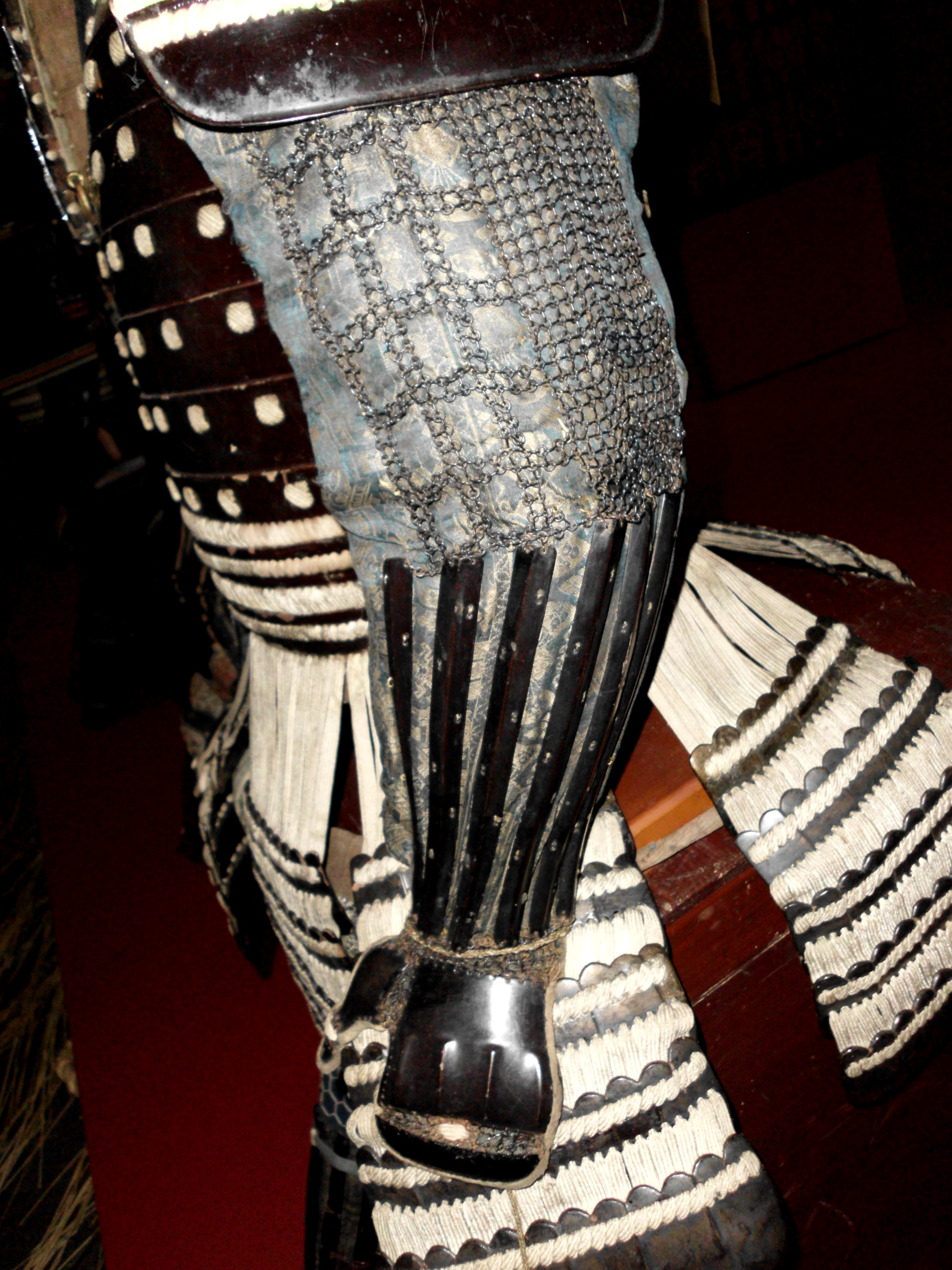
An antique Japanese (samurai) suit of armor, showing splinted vambraces

While a few complete suits of armour have been found made from splints of wood, leather, or bone, the Victorian neologism "splinted mail" usually refers to the limb protections of crusader knights. Depictions typically show it on the limbs of a person wearing mail, scale armour, a coat of plates or other plate harness.

Knights in effigy are depicted with leg protection of a matrix of disks with a diameter equal to the splints. This style appears to depict sabatons and splints on greaves, or may represent padded armour underneath splints, or the rivets on brigandine.

== See also ==
- Coat of plates
- Mirror armour
- Scale armour
- Mail and plate armour
- Gambeson
- Brigandine

== Bibliography ==
- Oakeshott, R. Ewart (1996) [1960]. The Archaeology of Weapons (Dover reprint ed.). Dover Publications. ISBN 0-486-29288-6.
