= Earl of Pembroke's Armour =

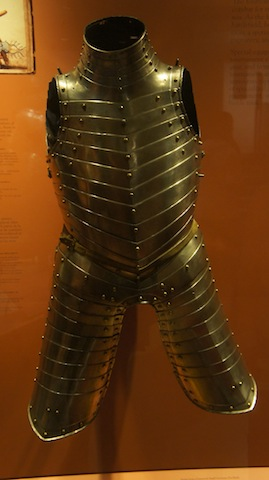
Front view of the armour

A suit of armour belonging to the Earl of Pembroke, William Herbert (1501-1570) is one of the pieces in the Royal Ontario Museum's European Collection.

== History ==
=== William Herbert, 1st Earl of Pembroke ===
William Herbert was a noble and courtier during the Tudor Period and served as a guardian to King Edward VI following the death of King Henry VIII. After King Edward's death he served Queen Mary I. The Earl had 3 children surviving to adulthood who also served the House of Tudor. William Herbert died on March 17, 1570, and is buried in St. Paul's Cathedral next to his first wife, Anne (Parr) Herbert.

=== The armour ===
The armour on display at the Royal Ontario Museum in Toronto is the torso and upper leg portion of the full suit that was created for William Herbert, 1st Earl of Pembroke. This piece is a rare example of armour made by master armourer Erasmus Kirkener at the Royal Armoury Workshops at Greenwich, England in the 1550s. The Greenwich workshops were founded by King Henry VIII in 1525 to provide tailored armour for nobles of England.

This piece, originally from the ancestral estate of the Earls of Pembroke, was kept in the Armoury of Wilton House near Salisbury in Wiltshire, England. After the First World War, as with many large country houses, the contents of Wilton House were sold. The selling of estates and their contents have an interesting history of their own tied in with the social and financial changes brought on by the war. Charles Currelly acquired this piece for the Royal Ontario Museum in 1930. It is on display in the Weston Family Gallery of the Samuel European Galleries.

== Description ==
The armour is composed of overlapping horizontal lames of steel that are held together by internal leather straps and sliding rivets. This Italian influenced design of armour found on the breastplate and backplate is known as anima. Kirkener designed animas between 1550 and 1560. The ROM's anima is one of only three surviving animas made at Greenwich in public collections. Animas formed the core parts of armour garnitures.

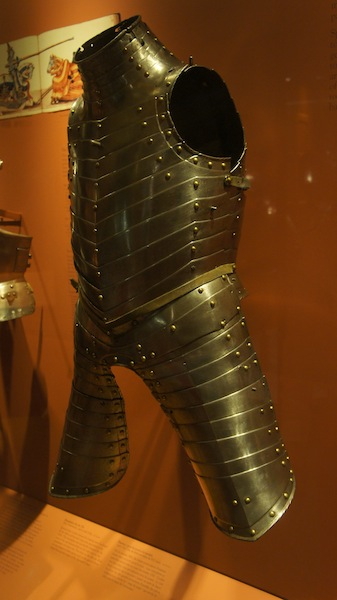
Side view of the armour

Garniture armour is a collection of interchangeable pieces which could be rearranged for various combat situations. Pembroke's armour forms what is known as a small garniture that would be used for infantry and light or heavy cavalry use.

In addition to serving as protection for the wearer, the armour is reflective of fashion styles during the 1550s. The shape of the shoulders and sides of this piece reflect the cut of the doublet worn by civilians during the reign of Mary I. The custom-made piece also reflects the physical dimensions of the Earl of Pembroke.
