= Maximilian armour =

Early 16th-century German plate armour

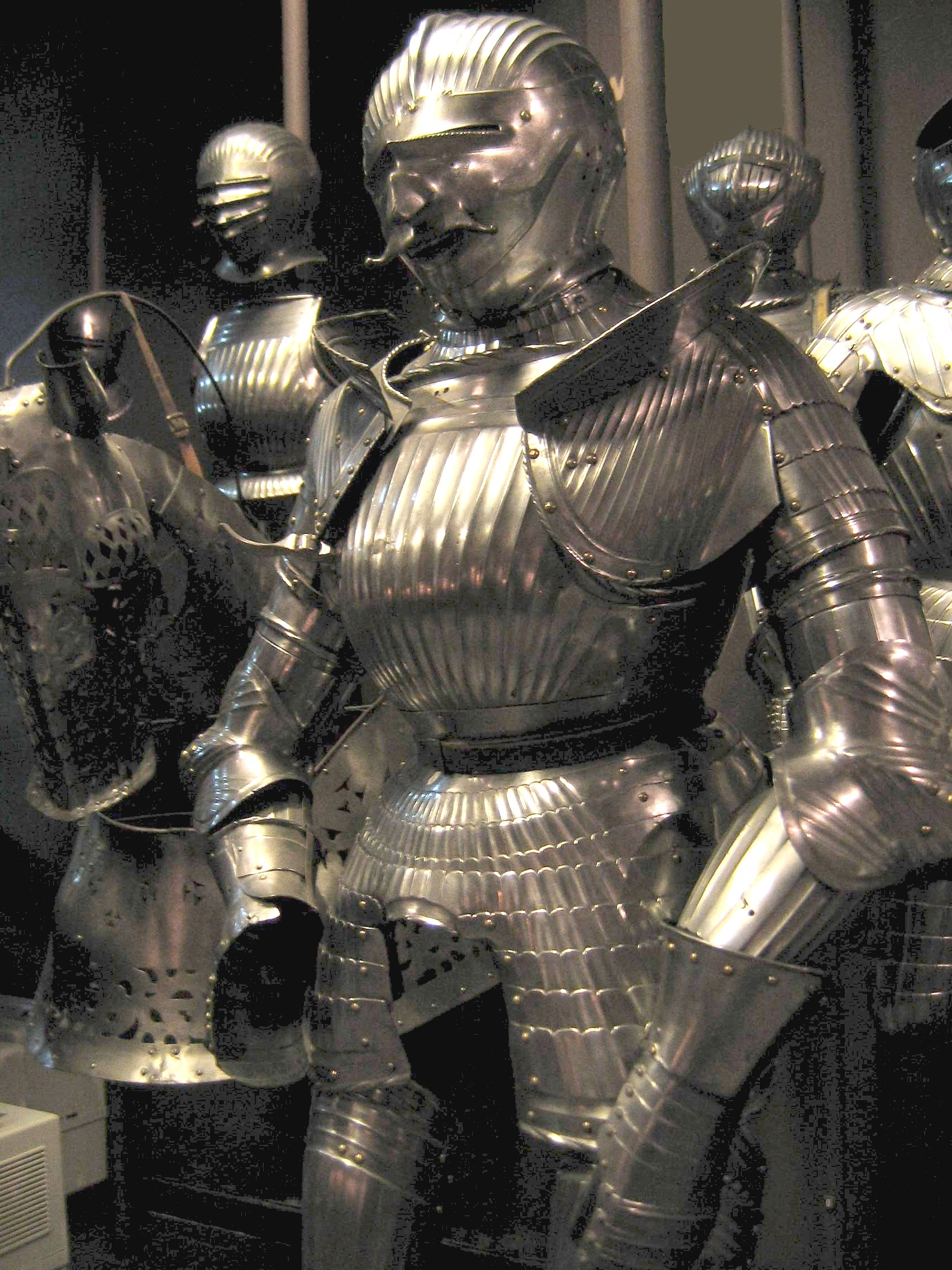
Maximilan armour with grotesque mask. In the background are two other Maximilian suits of armour with sparrow-beaked and bellows-shaped visors. Photo taken in the Polish Army Museum in Warsaw.

Maximilian armour is a modern term applied to the style of early 16th-century German plate armour associated with, and possibly first made for the Emperor Maximilian I. The armour is still white armour, made in plain steel, but it is decorated with many flutings that may also have played a role in deflecting the points and blades of assailants and increasing the structural strength of the plates. It is a transitional stage in the decoration of armour, after the plain steel surfaces of 15th-century armour and before the elaborate decoration and colouring with etching and other techniques of Renaissance armour. The armour is characterized by armets and close helmets with bellows visors; small fan-shaped narrow and parallel fluting—often covering most of the harness (but never the greaves); etching; work taken from woodcuts; sharply waisted cuirasses, and squared sabatons.

According to an alternative version, the name is related to Maximilian II, as the last Maximilian armour was made especially for him in 1557, seventeen years after it passed out of general use.

The armour was designed to imitate the pleated clothing that was considered fashionable in Europe at the time. Some armour combined long pleat-like fluting with lines of rectangular shapes imitating contemporary fabrics decorated with slashing or quilting. A trend that developed in 15th and especially 16th-century Europe was to create armour that not only provided the maximum amount of protection, but was also visually pleasing. Maximilian armour combined the rounded Italian style of armour with the German fluted style.

Not every armour worn by Maximilian I was Maximilian-style armour. The most famous armour worn by Maximilian was Gothic-style armour, which was worn by Maximilian when he was a young prince and later presented as an honourable wedding gift for his uncle Sigmund. Maximilian I became emperor in 1493 and died in 1519, but classic Maximilian armour is known from 1515 to 1525, and similarly shaped armour with less or different fluting was produced from 1500. Surviving pieces bearing the mark of the Nuremberg armourer Valentin Siebenbürger (fl. c. 1510 – c. 1564) show that fully developed fluted field armour was still being produced into the early 1530s, more than a decade after Maximilian I's death. At least 36 of Siebenbürger's works, ranging from complete harnesses to isolated breastplates, gauntlets, and crinets, are now preserved in museum collections across Europe and North America.

== Transitional Schott-Sonnenberg style ==
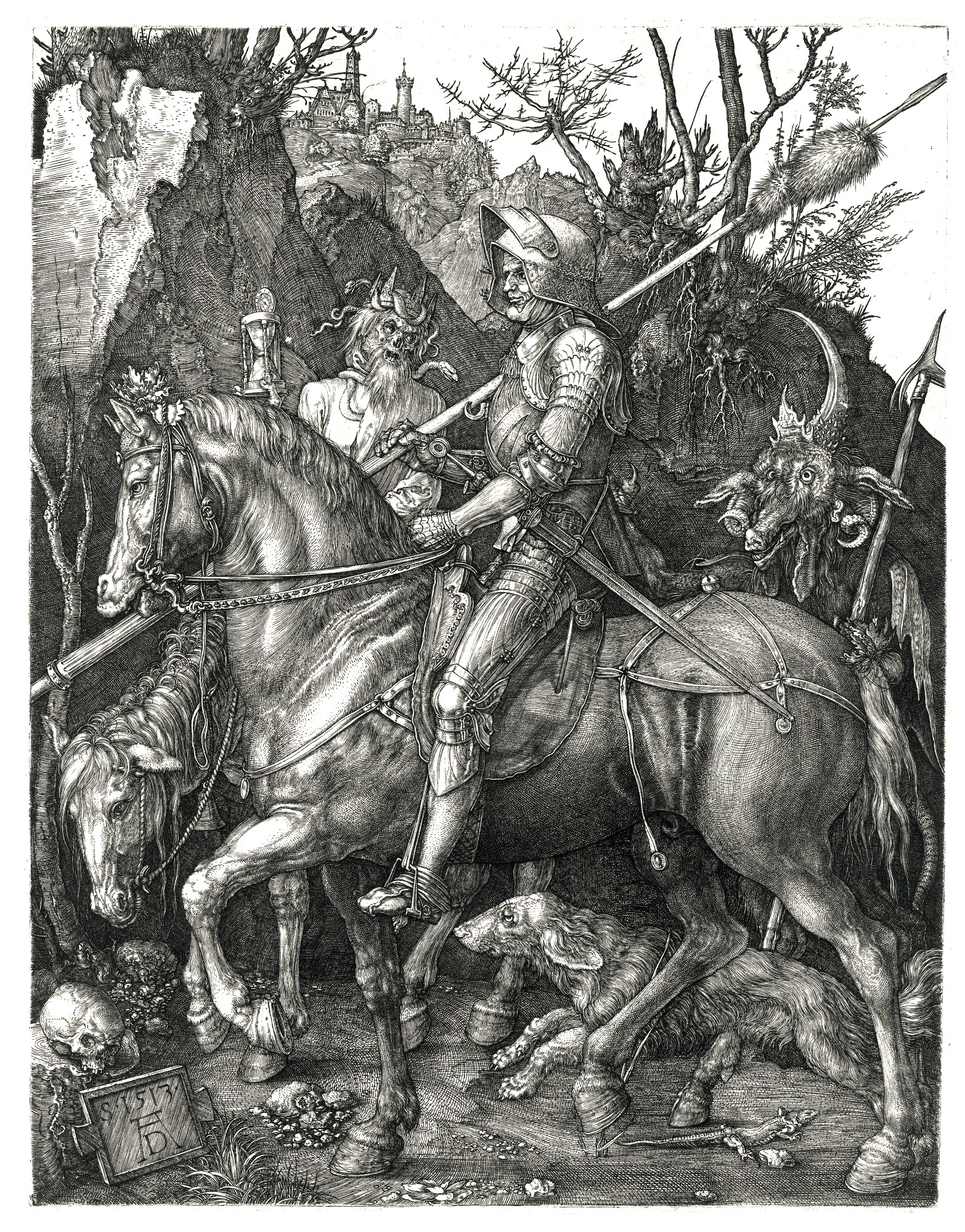
Schott-Sonnenberg Style of Armour (worn with sallet and gothic gauntlets)

Early types of Maximilian armour with either no fluting or wolfzähne (wolf teeth) style fluting (which differs from classic Maximilian fluting) and could be worn with a sallet are called Schott-Sonnenberg style armour by Oakeshott. This transitional armour was worn from 1500 to 1520, and true Maximilian armour was worn from 1515 to 1525. Some other historians do not fully separate Schott-Sonnenberg style from Maximilian armour.

=== Italian "alla tedesca" (a la German) armour ===
Italian "alla tedesca" ("a la German") armour is an Italian armour of 1500 to 1515 with fluting and the Maximilan breast shape. Knee-long tassets were often worn with a bellows-visored sallet. This kind of armour is considered by Oakeshott to be a kind of Schott-Sonnenberg Style armour made by Italians for the German market.

=== Parallels with late (rounded) kastenbrust armour ===
It is interesting to find that the cuirass-shape of the Schott-Sonnenberg style was foreshadowed in Germany half a century before it finally appeared. Several tomb effigies and paintings of 1400–1500 show extremely rounded, bulbous breastplates – as I have said (page 82), this was often an alternative to the boxed Kastenbrust style ...

Such armour of the first half of the 15th century are separated by Oakeshott from kastenbrust armour as alwite armour. However, other historians consider it as a kind of kastenbrust armour.

== Maximilian armour and fluted armour ==
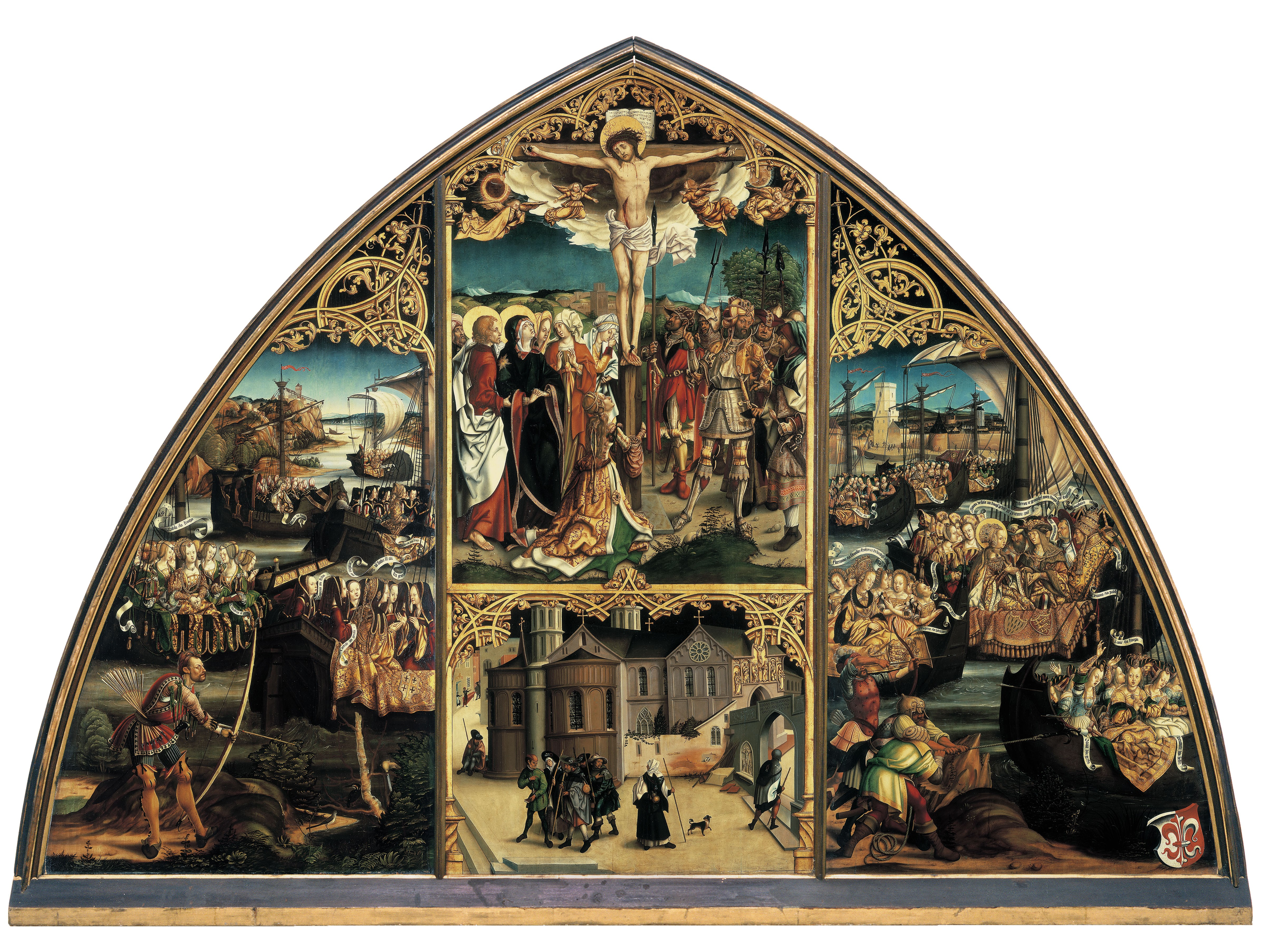
Burgkmair – S. Croce – Basilica Cycle 6

The terms Maximiliansharnisch (Maximilian armour) and Riefelharnisch (fluted armour) have been used interchangeably. There are debates over the connection between Maximilian I and fluted armour. Gerhard Quaas opines that fluted armour was only distributed after Maximilian's death and direct influence of the emperor cannot be proven. Franz Niehoff writes that the emperor did play a supporting role in the invention of the fluted armour and the term Maximiliansharnisch can be used to highlight the contribution of the Innsbruck armour makers, and the role of artists like Hans Leinberger should also be noted.

Tilman Falk notes that the armour worn by a captain in Hans Burgkmair's work (1504) in the Basilica Santa Croce, classified by Weis-Liebersdorf as Maximiliansharnisch, was still in transitional phase in comparison with the later fluted armour style. Larry Silver agrees with Tilman Falk that there was an intimate connection between armour suits depicted in Maximilian's woodcut projects and the armours actually designed for him. Armour designed by the Helmschmieds for Maximilian in particular increasingly favoured a "rounder and simpler form, termed 'classical' by the historians of armor, in contrast to the angularity of the 'baroque Gothic'. Dominated by overlapping, scalelike plates and more regular patterns of decoration, these suits were increasingly regularized and evolved into the Riefelharnisch."

== Gallery ==
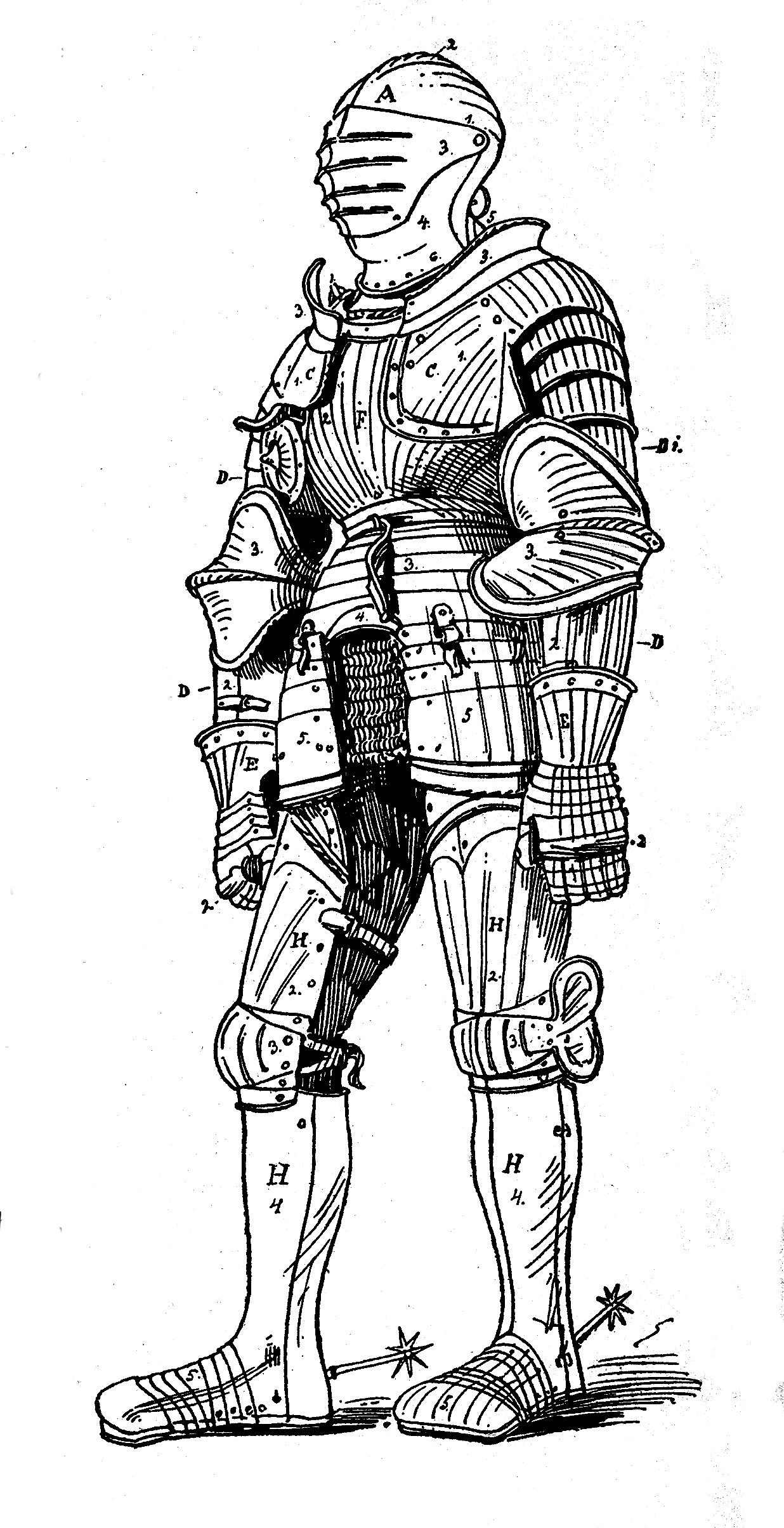
Diagram of Maximilian armour from the front

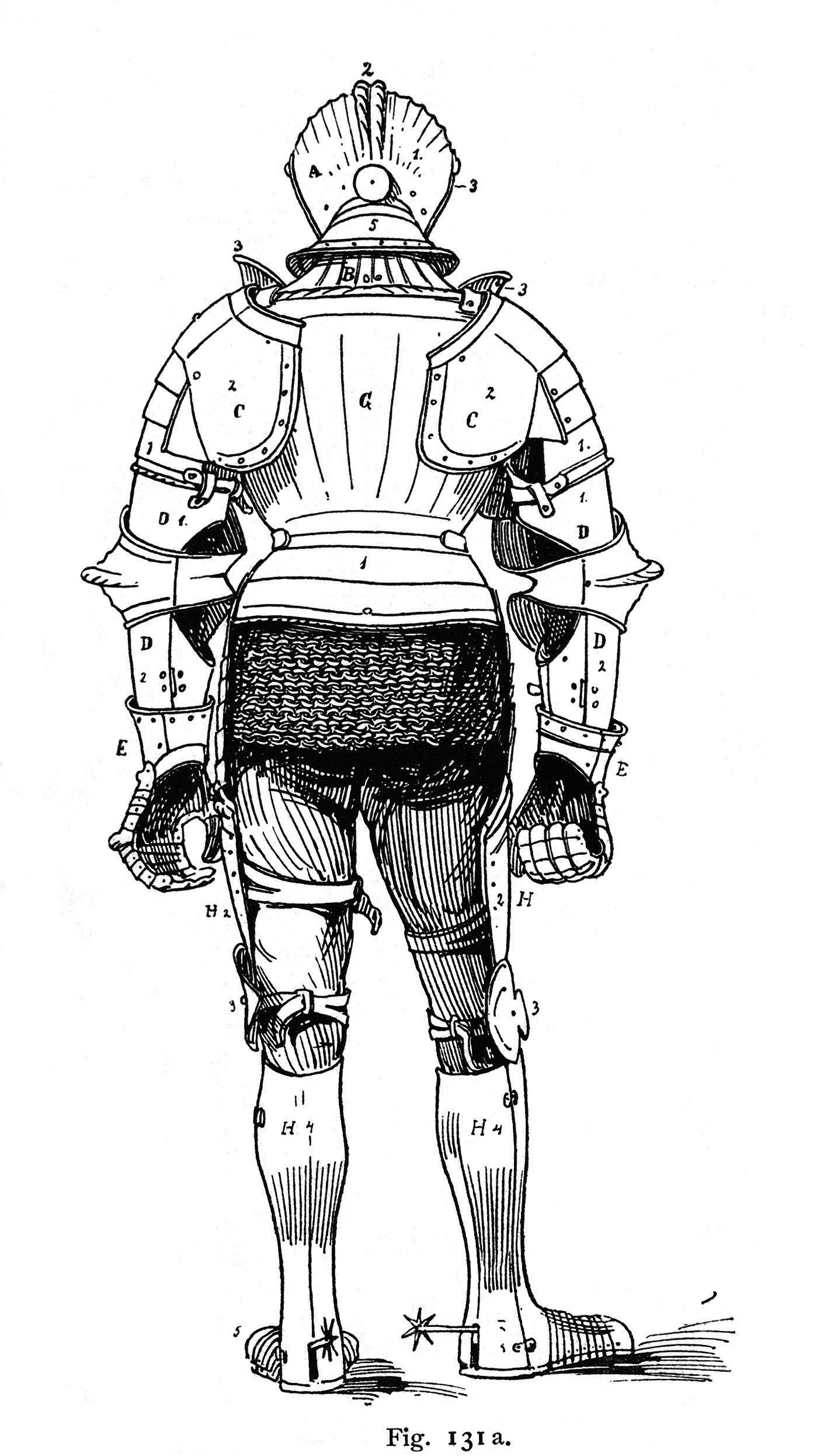
Diagram of Maximilian armour from the back

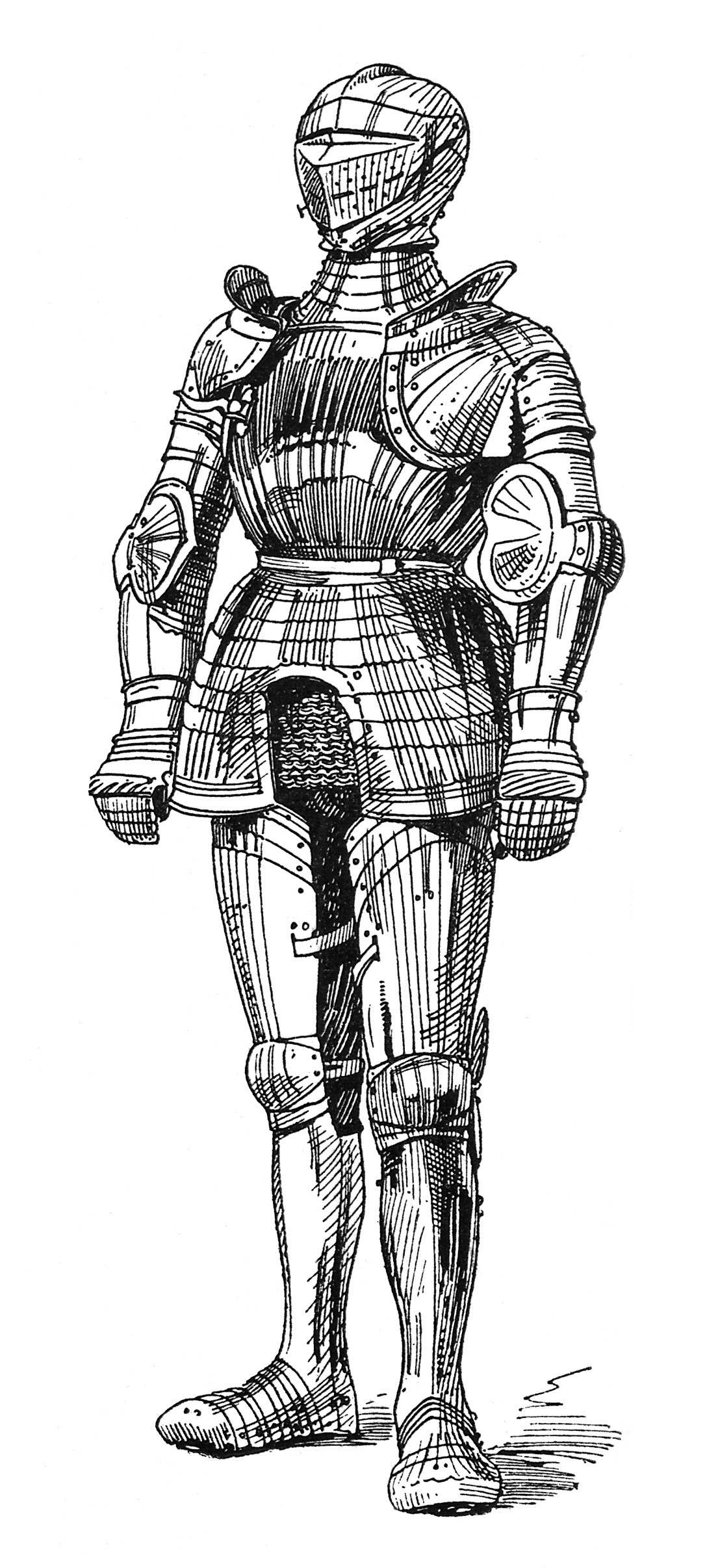
Sparrow-beak visored Maximilian armour

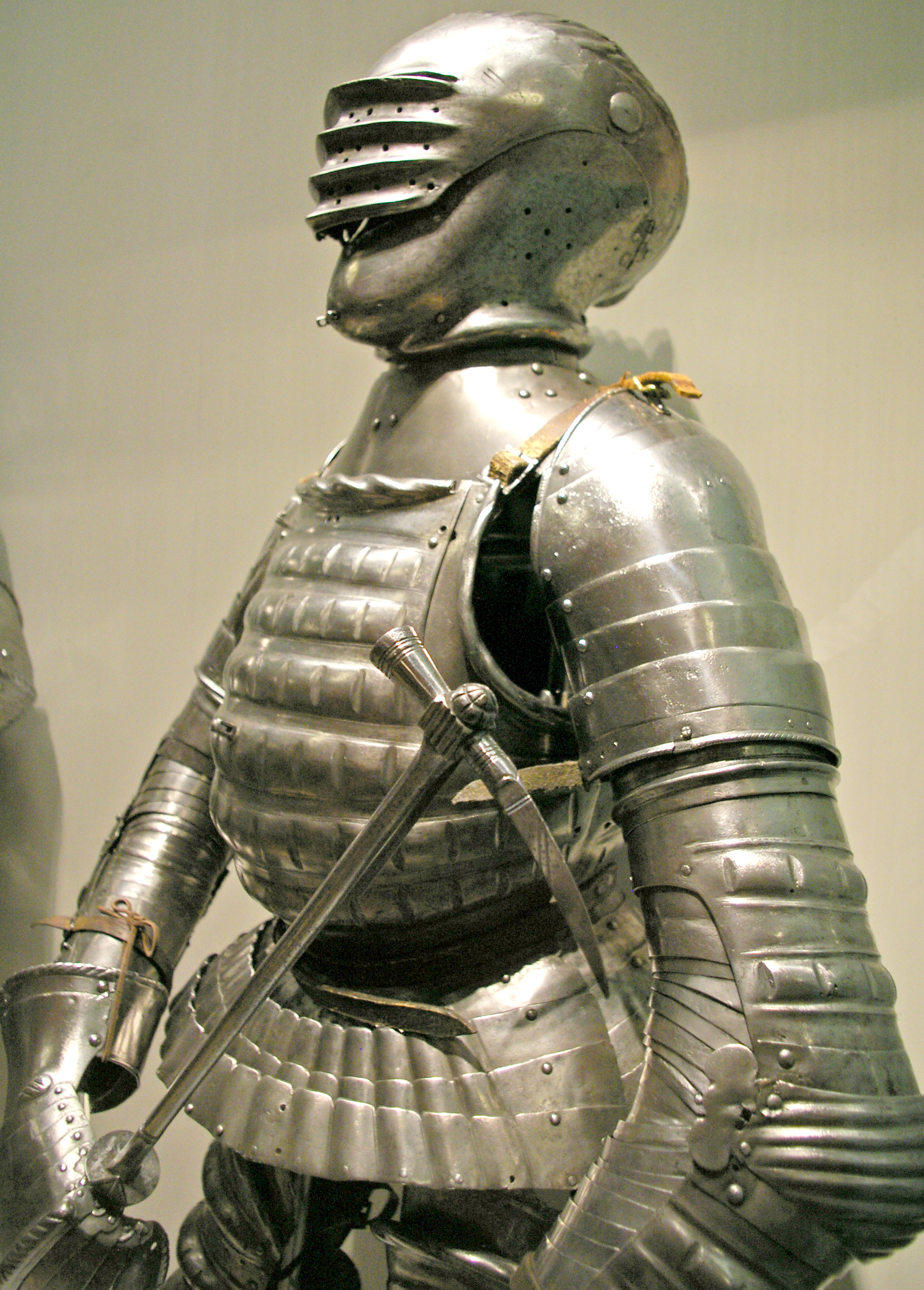
Fluting and imitation slashed or quilted fabrics

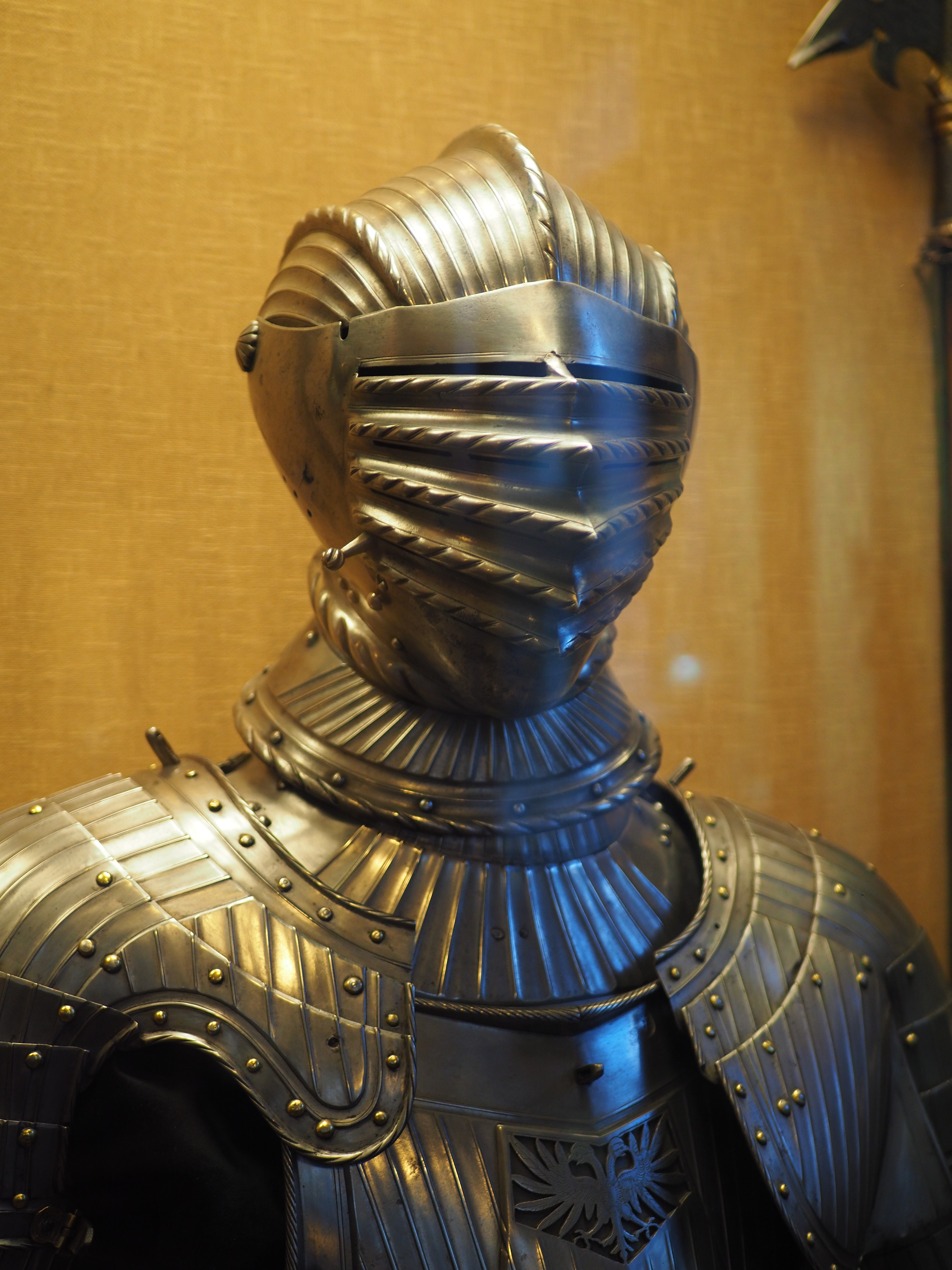
1612 Armour in the style of 1510-30. Located in the Wallace Collection.

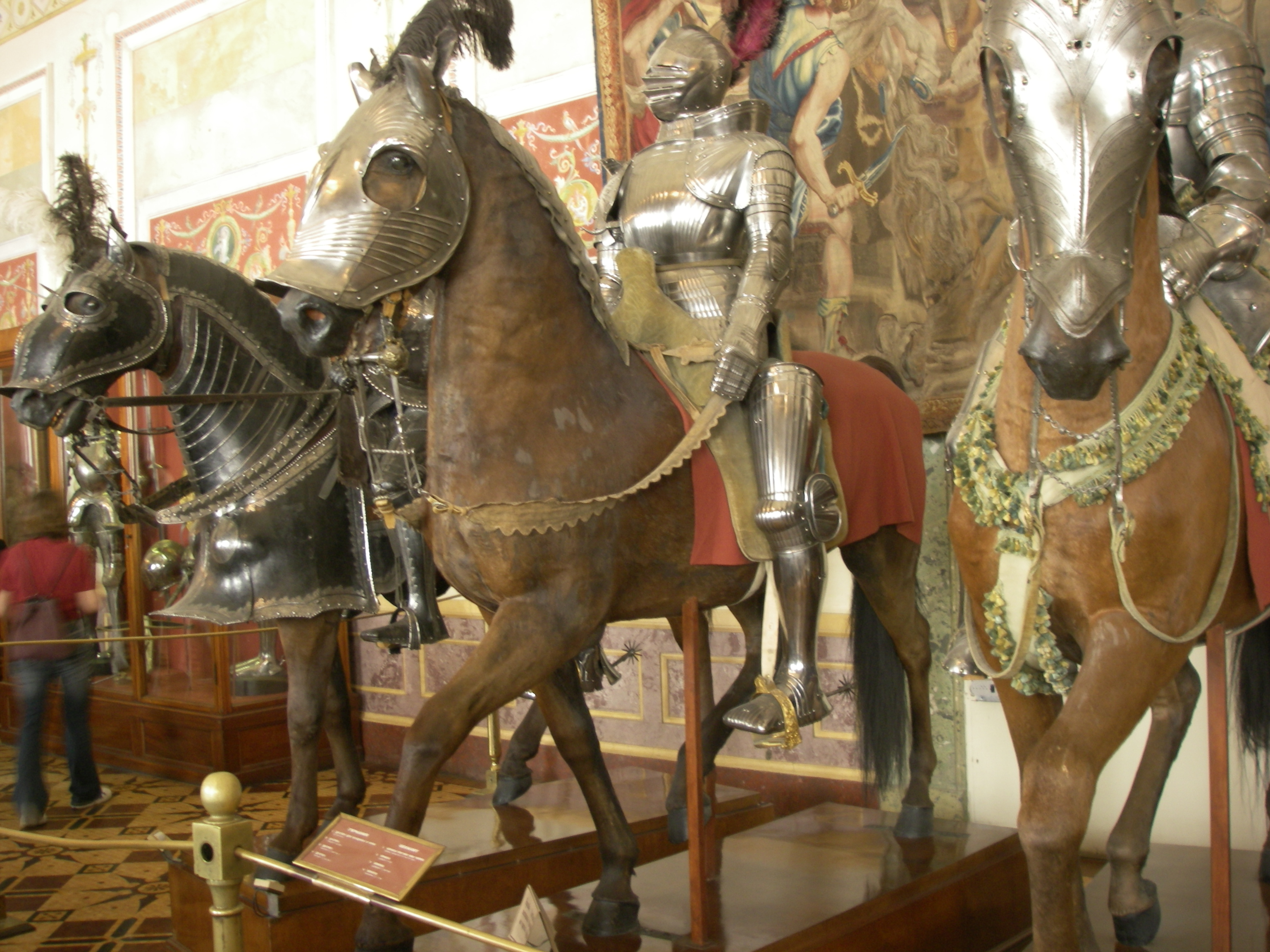
Bellows-visored Maximilian armour located at the Hermitage

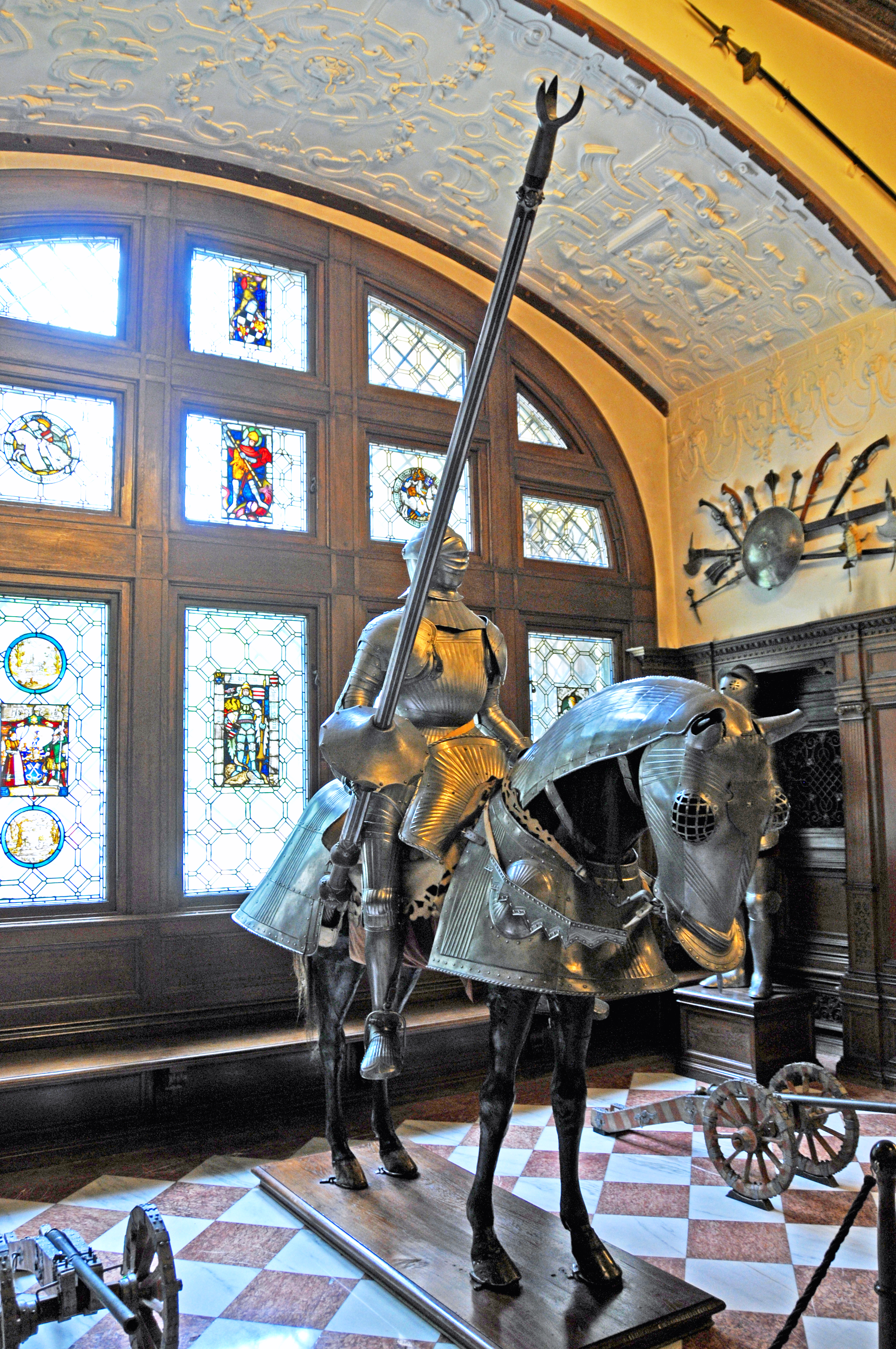
Complete Maximilian tournament harness at Peleș Castle

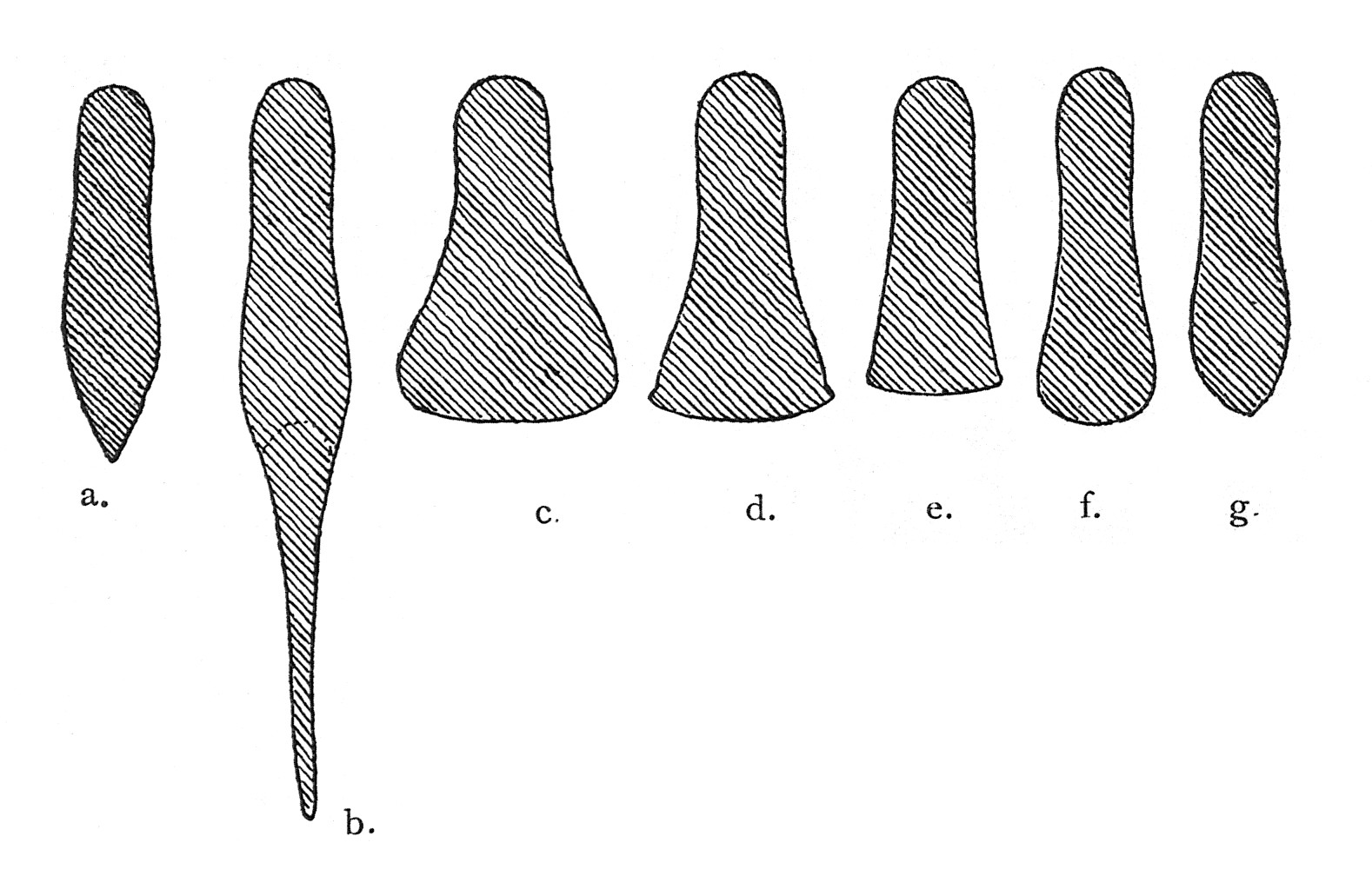
Sabatons evolution by Wendelin Boeheim:
- а) 1290–1390
- b) 1300–1490
- с) 1500–1530
- d) 1530–1540
- е) 1540–1550
- f) 1550–1560
- g) 1560–1590

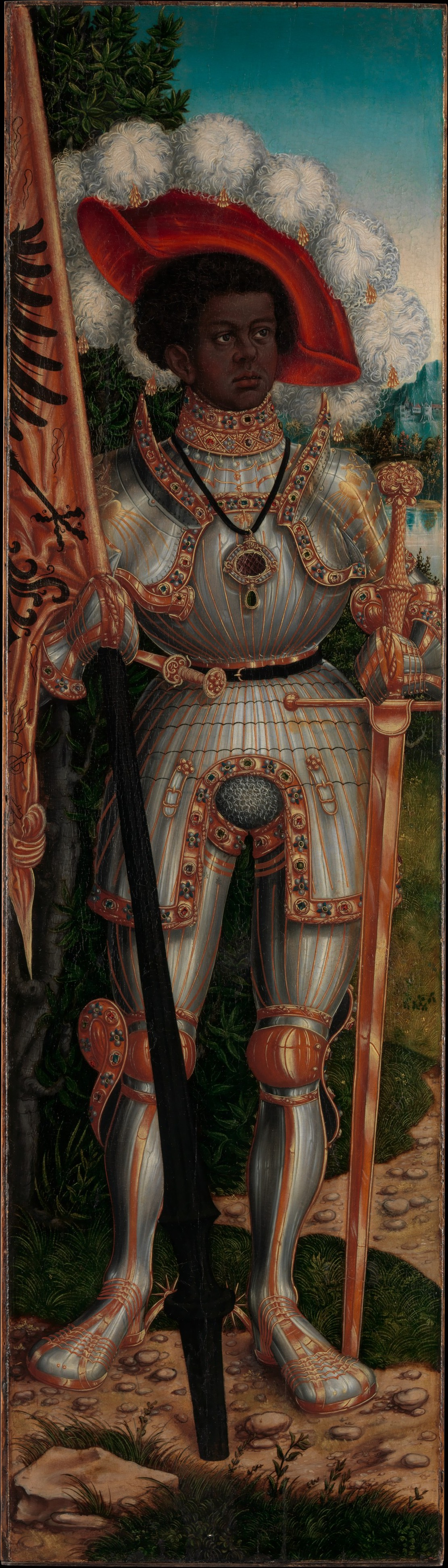
Saint Maurice by Lucas Cranach the Elder (1472–1553), depicted wearing a full silver armour that was either made for Maximilian I(later acquired by Emperor Charles V) or commissioned by Cardinal Albrecht of Brandenburg for Charles V to be used in his coronation in Aachen in 1520.

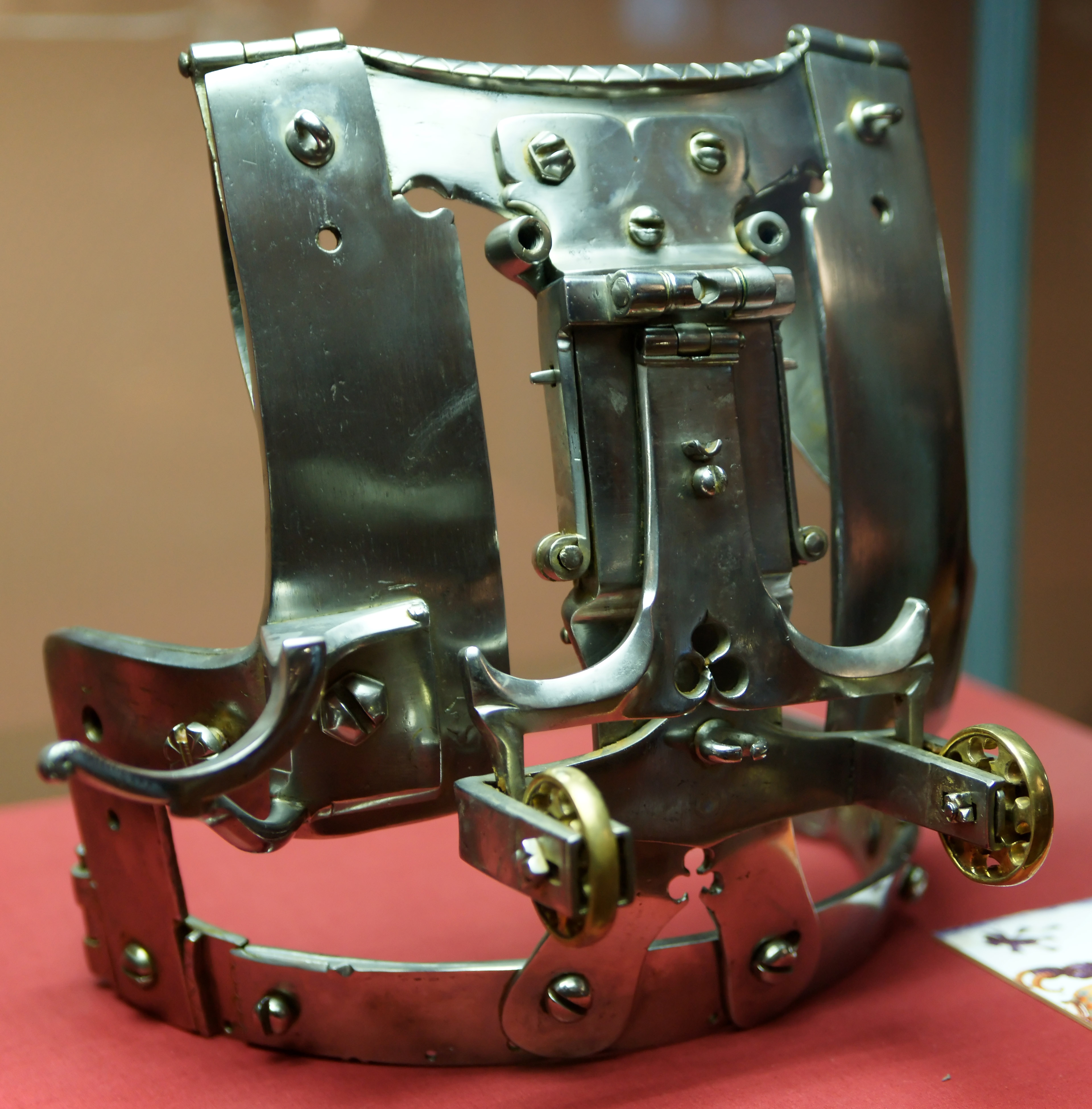
HJRK B 21 - Mechanical breastpiece used for Bundrennen, a tournament type which was probably only organized in the Imperial Court, c. 1490. Only three mechanical breastplates remain (one in Paris, two in Vienna). The breastplate was designed to carry a shield that, when hit properly, will be ejected over the jouster's head and burst apart, releasing triangle tin segments.

== See also ==
- Armour under the patronage of Maximilian I, in Cultural depictions of Maximilian I, Holy Roman Emperor
- Gothic plate armour
- Greenwich armour
