= Plackart =

Part in medieval and Renaissance armour

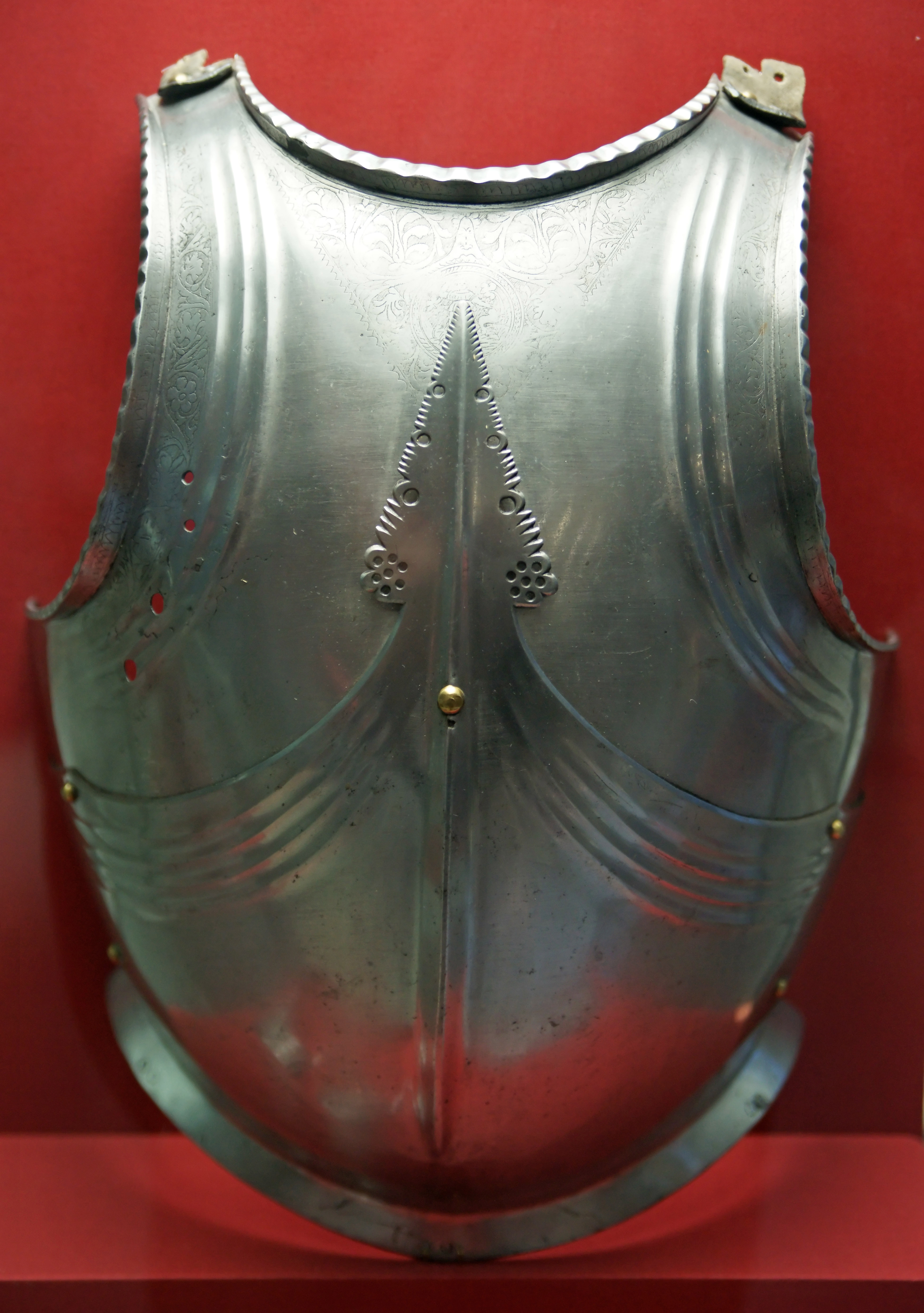
Plackart covering most of a cuirass breastplate

A plackart (also spelt placcard, planckart or placcate) is a piece of medieval and Renaissance plate armour, initially covering the lower half of the front torso. It was a plate reinforcement that composed the bottom part of the front of a medieval breastplate. They were predominantly worn in the 15th century. Sometimes they were worn with a metal finish, while the top part of the cuirass was covered in material (often velvet), the difference in finish making a contrast.

The plackart stopped at the natural waist, and metal plates, much like a skirt, were attached to the bottom of the plackart. These were called faulds, and protected the hip and the groin.

The plackart originally protected the bottom half of the torso, and was attached to the breastplate which covered the top half of the torso. The plackart could be attached with rivets in such a way that it could slide and give movement, though sometimes they were fixed, so the whole front part of the cuirass acted as one solid piece.

Eventually, especially in Italian armour, it evolved to the point where it covered more of the front of the armour, covering nearly the entire breastplate. This form of plackart was later employed by cuirassiers and other armoured cavalry of the late 16th and 17th centuries as a reinforcement designed to give added protection against firearms.

Plackarts of the German Gothic style were often fluted (a form of decoration that gave straight ridges to the armour) and generally more decorated than the Italian style. Fluting decorated the armour while also making it stronger, and possibly deflected sword blows by guiding them off the armour. The tip of the plackart, where it met the breastplate, was often decorated.

== See also ==
- Gorget
- Pauldrons
- Greaves
- Brigandine
- Munition armour
