= Brust =

Brust (from Middle High German Brust "chest" "breast") is a surname.

== People ==
- Barry Brust (born 1983), Canadian ice hockey player
- Ben Brust (born 1991), American basketball player
- Leo Joseph Brust (1916–1995), American Roman Catholic bishop
- Peter Brust (1869–1946), American architect
- Preston Brust, member of LoCash
- Steven Brust (born 1955), American writer

== Fictional ==
- Ben Brust, character in the novel Subterranean

== See also ==
- Kasten-brust armour
