= Gousset =

Component found in 15th-century battle gear

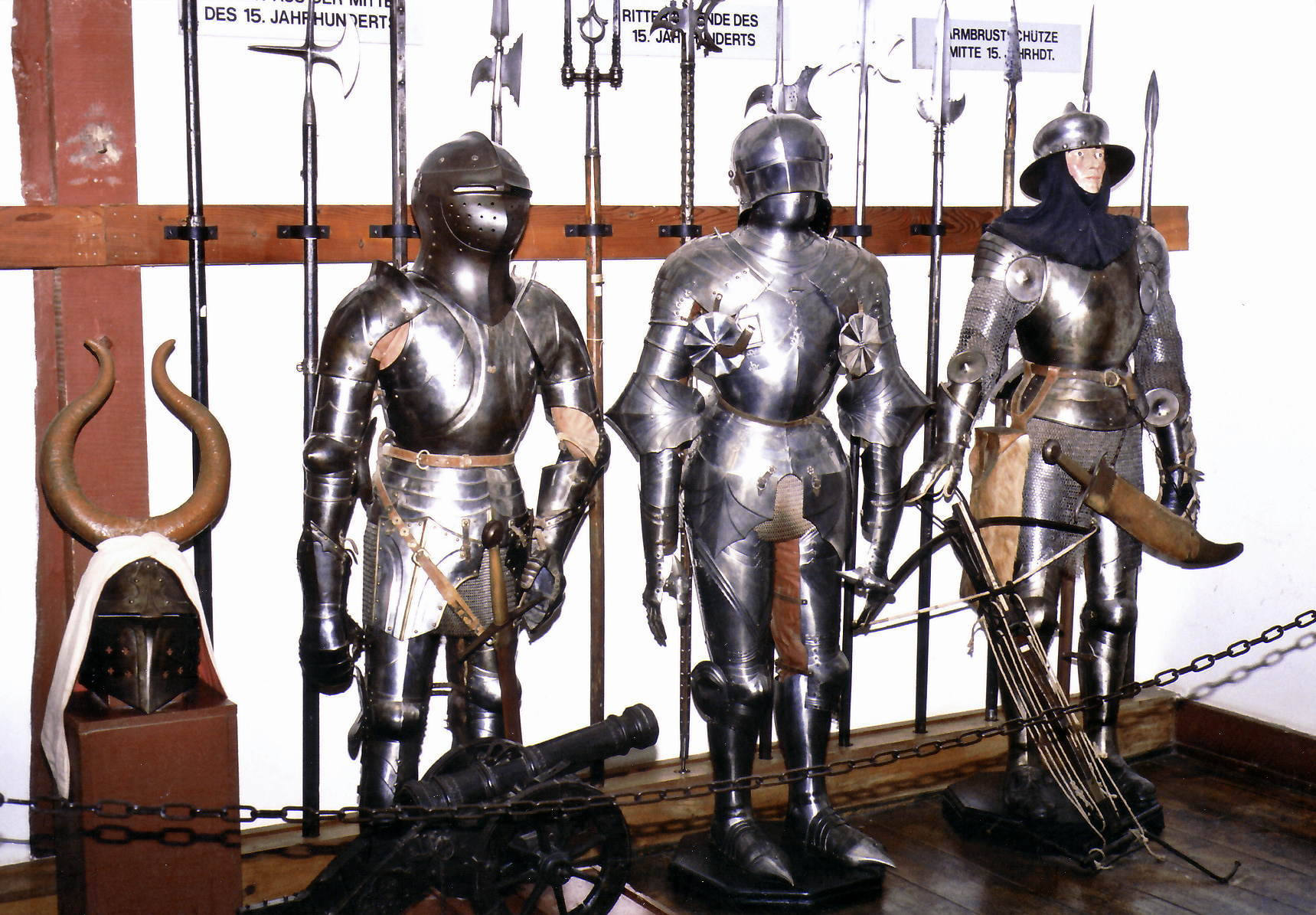
Late fifteenth century gothic armor: the suit at left has gousset at the hip and probably included it at the elbow and armpit. Gousset is visible at all of these locations on the suit at far right.

Gousset was a component of late Medieval armor. During the transition from mail to plate armor, sections of mail covered parts of the body that were not protected by steel plate. These sections of mail were known as gousset. Gousset came into use in the fourteenth century as plate became a structural part of a suit of knightly armor rather than an addition strapped over a suit of mail. During the fourteenth century there was considerable variation in the ratio of gousset to plate.

By the early fifteenth century the use of gousset was generally restricted to joints such as the hip, neck, armpits, and elbows. It declined in Italian white armour as improvements in armor design covered these areas with plate. Gousset was nearly absent from white armor by 1450, but remained in German Gothic plate armour throughout most of the century.

The term has been lent to clothing as gusset.
