= Ortwin Gamber =

Austrian art historian (1925–2008)

- Born: 21 March 1925; Enns, Upper Austria
- Died: 2008 (aged 82−83)
- Education: University of Vienna; Institut für Österreichische Geschichtsforschung
- Known for: Noted weapon collector
- Awards: Theodor Körner Prize
- Scientific career
- Fields: Art history
- Workplaces: Kunsthistorisches Museum
- Thesis: Der Plattenharnisch im 15. Jahrhundert (1950)
- Doctoral advisor: Karl Maria Swoboda

Ortwin Gamber (21 March 1925 – 2008) was an Austrian art historian who served as director of the weapons collection at the Kunsthistorisches Museum from 1976 to 1986. He had previously volunteered and following his 1950 graduation, worked at the museum since 1945. He is also a noted weapon collector, and has written several books and articles on the subject.

== Life and career ==
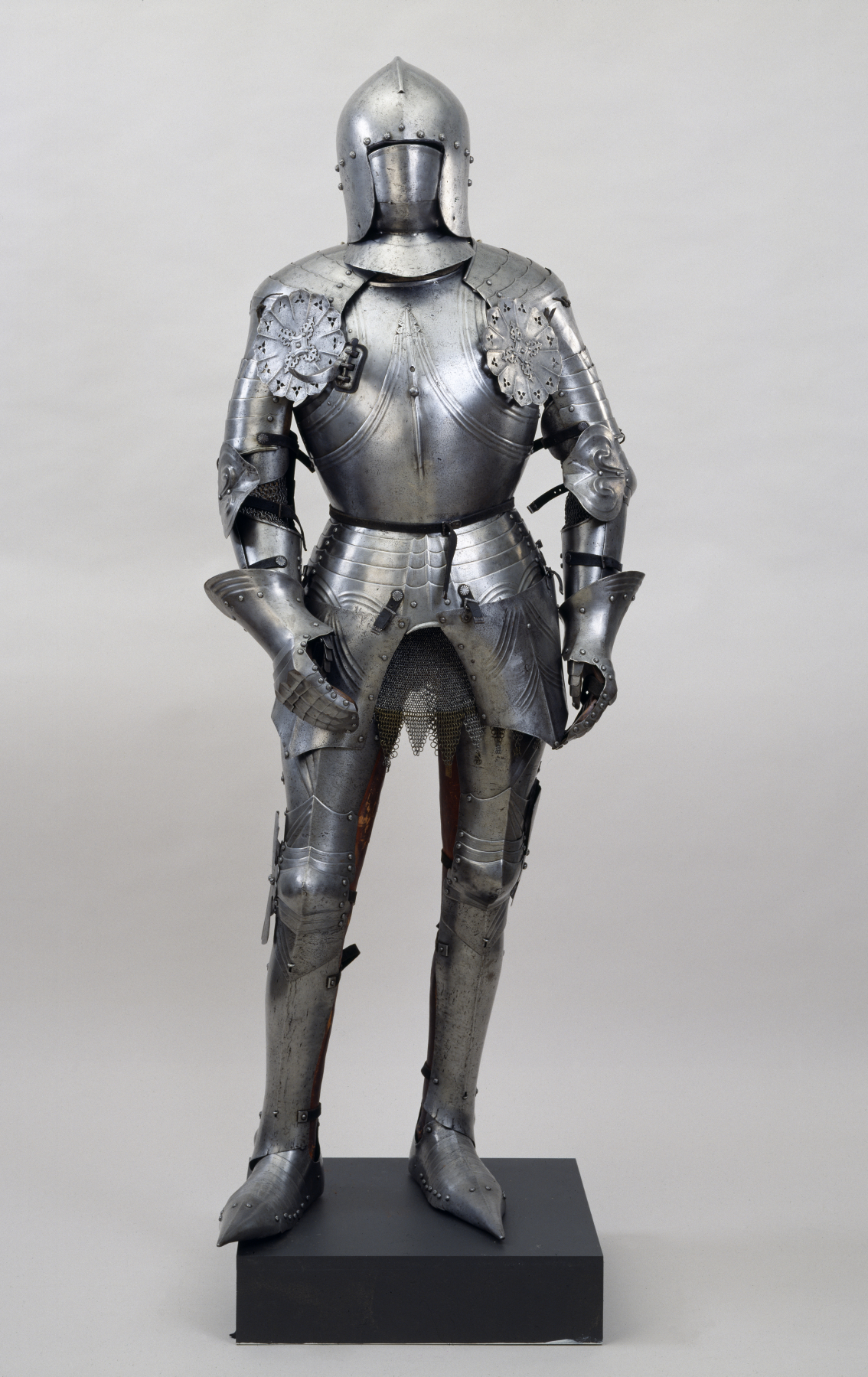
Italian suit of armour with sallet, c. 1450

Ortwin Gamber was born on 21 March 1925 in Enns, Upper Austria. Studying under Karl Maria Swoboda (de), he obtained his Ph.D. from the University of Vienna in 1950, with the thesis Der Plattenharnisch im 15. Jahrhundert ("The plate armor in the 15th century"). He also studied from 1948 to 1950 at the Institut für Österreichische Geschichtsforschung (de), passing the Staatsexamen with the thesis Die Innsbrucker Plattnerei von 1450 bis zum Tode Kaiser Maximilians I ("The Innsbruck Armoury from 1450 Until the Death of Emperor Maximilian I"); during his studies, from 1945 until 1950, he also volunteered at the weapons collection of the Kunsthistorisches Museum in Vienna. Following his graduation, in 1950 Gamber was hired for a staff position at the Kunsthistorisches Museum. He was variously promoted over the succeeding quarter-century, and from 1976 until 1986 served as the director of the weapons collection there.

In 1962, Gamber was awarded the Theodor Körner Prize. The same year he was made an honorary member of the Arms and Armour Society (de).

Gamber died in 2008.

== Publications ==
Gamber wrote dozens of articles on the subject of arms and armour. The list below is incomplete; a more complete list appears in Broucek & Peball 2000.

- Gamber, Ortwin (December 1982). "Some Notes on the Sutton Hoo Military Equipment". The Journal of the Arms & Armour Society. X (6). Translated by Eaves, Ian. London: 208–216. ISSN 0004-2439.

== Bibliography ==
- Broucek, Peter & Peball, Kurt (2000). "Gamber, Ortwin". Geschichte der österreichischen Militärhistoriographie. Weimar: Böhlau Verlag. pp. 359–362. ISBN 3-412-05700-2.
