= White armour =

Late Middle Ages European plate armour

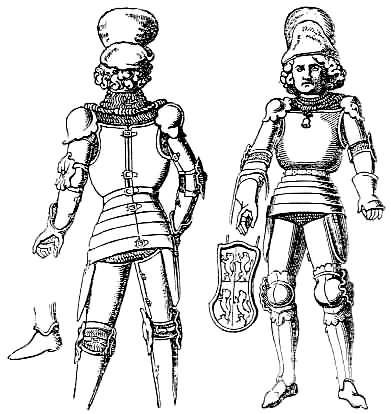
An early type of alwyte armour; note that it opens from the back like a brigandine, so it could be considered as a late type of transitional armour

White armour, or alwyte armour, was a form of plate armour worn in the Late Middle Ages characterized by full-body steel plate without a surcoat. Around 1420 the surcoat, or "coat of arms" as it was known in England, began to disappear, in favour of uncovered plate. Areas not covered by plate were protected by mail sewn to the gambeson underneath.

During the fifteenth century national styles of armour emerged. 'White armour' was a term used synonymously with Italian design, which was innovative in expanding the use of plate armour to cover joints that had been previously protected by mail. The descriptive term white armour referred both to the absence of a surcoat and the absence of decorative trimmings: the rival German style was fluted, both for aesthetic reasons and for structural advantage in resisting crushing blows. Unlike its predecessors, white armour had a very plain and simple finish, as opposed to intricate patterns or symbols emblazoned on its plates. White armour was also exclusively worn by nobles, or those with money, as full plate armour was extremely expensive to create.

Suits of white armour were composed of a helmet, a gorget (or bevor), pauldrons with gardbraces in Italian and French armour to cover the armpits, or besagews (also known as rondels) which were mostly used in Gothic Armour, couters, vambraces, gauntlets, a cuirass (back and breastplate) with a fauld, tassets and a culet, a mail skirt, cuisses, poleyns, greaves, and sabatons.

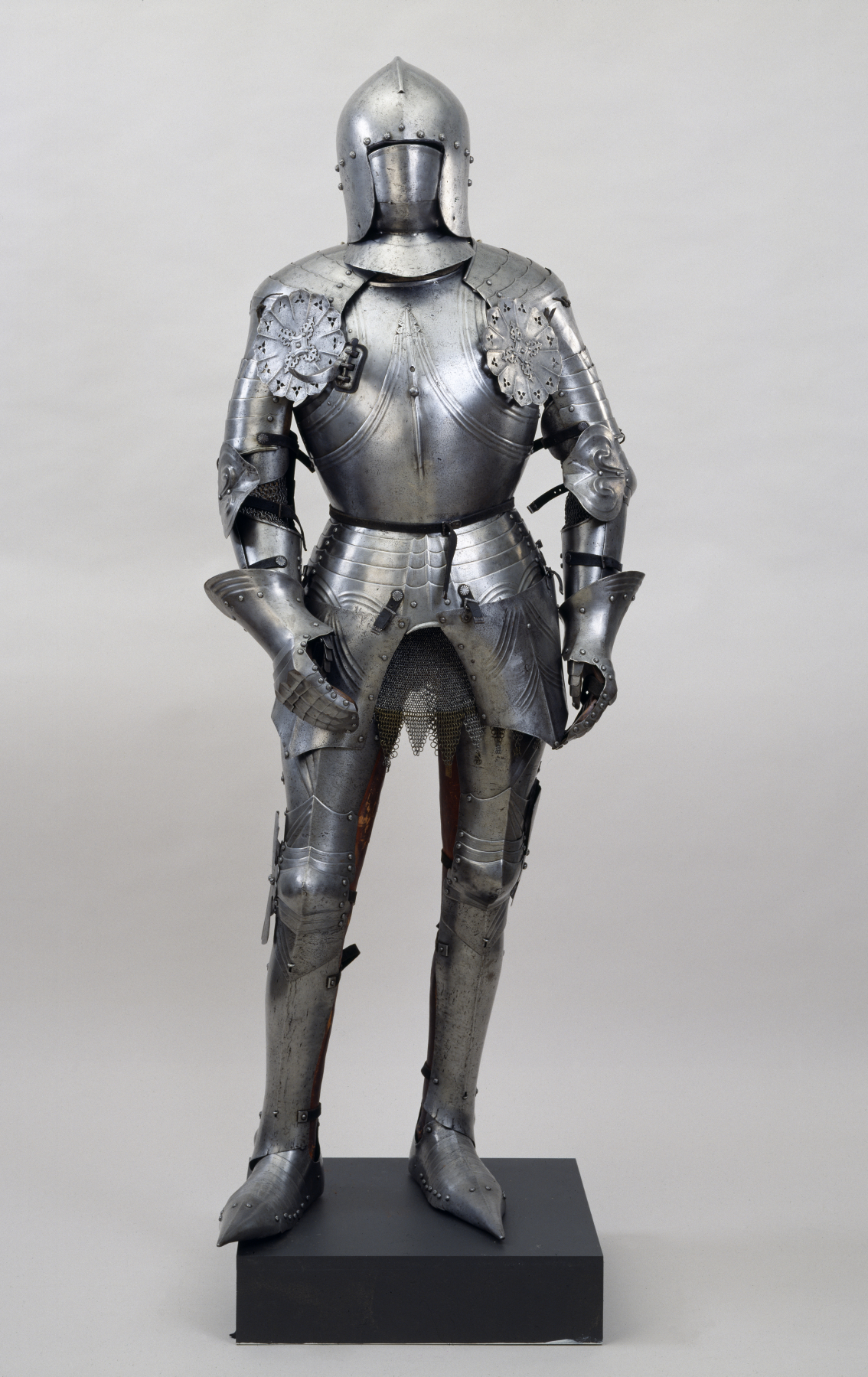
Italian "white armour" from 1450 that stands out due to its full body steel plating and plating over the joints

Unlike its predecessors, white armour provided almost complete invulnerability to all sword strikes except a strong thrust from the tip. Additionally, since white armour was a later version of plate armour, it was fairly light and provided its wearer a comfortable range of motion.

These two approaches to armouring remained recognizable throughout the fifteenth century. Eventually each borrowed the other's innovations. By the early sixteenth century the distinction became obsolete.

Black and white armour is a different term, for late 16th and 17th century armour that uses a contrast between highly burnished "white" and unpolished "black" areas for decorative effect in large bold patterns over the armour.

== See also ==
Predecessors

- Brigandine
- Transitional armour

Successors

- Milanese armour
- Kasten-brust armour

== Bibliography ==
- Arlen, J. (n.d.). Glossary of Medieval Armour and Armour-Related Terms. Retrieved October 28, 2018, from http://jamesarlen.com/glossaryTZ.html
- Ewart Oakeshott. European Weapons and Armour from the Renaissance to the Industrial Revolution. F.S.A. ISBN 0-85115-789-0
- Wendelin Boeheim. Handbuch der Waffenkunde. Das Waffenwesen in seiner historischen Entwicklung vom Beginn des Mittelalters bis zum Ende des 18 Jahrhunders. Leipzig 1890.
