= Kasten-brust armour =

German form of plate armour from the first half of 15th century

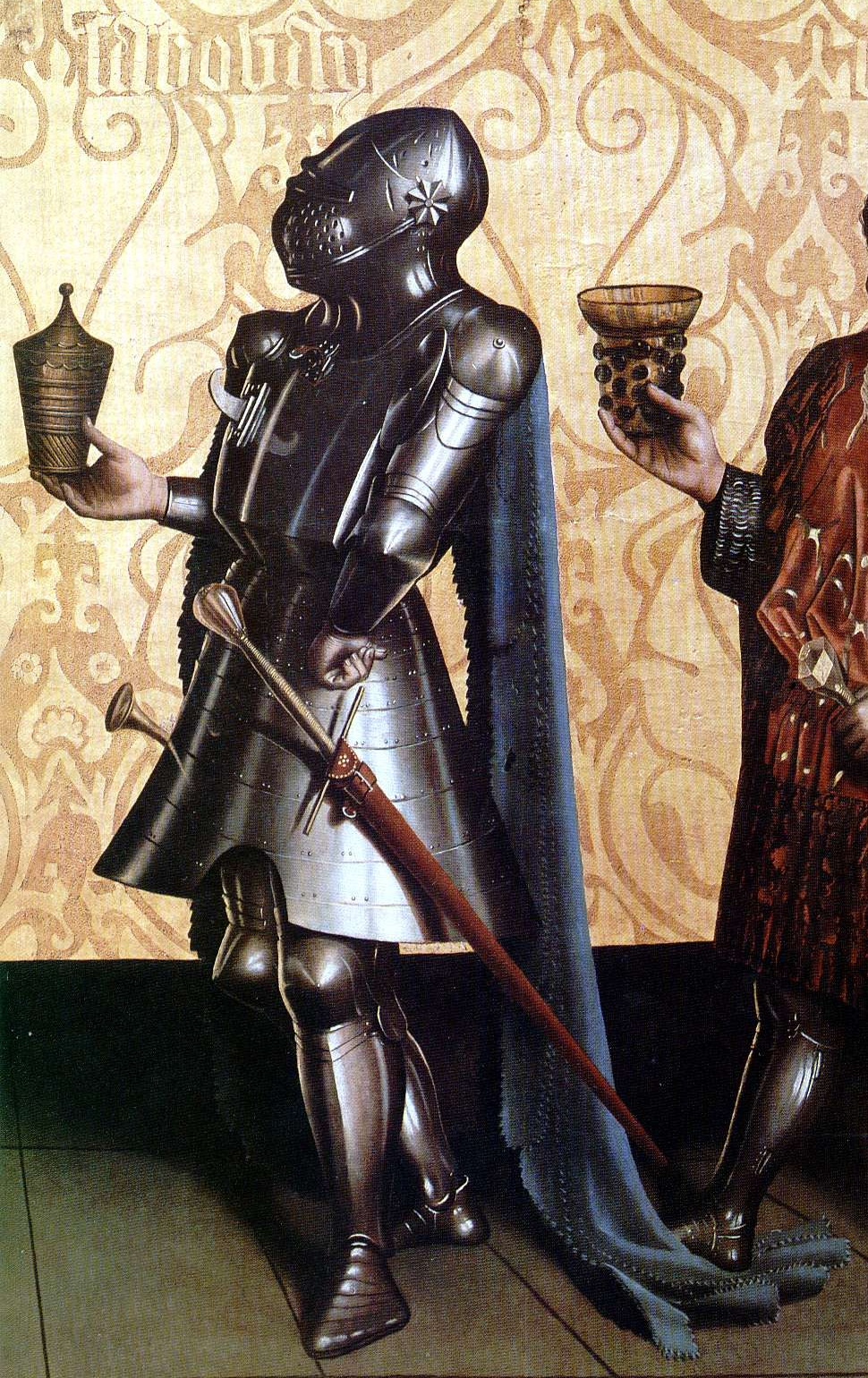
A knight in full kasten-brust armour without gauntlets (altar of Saint Leonard church in Basel by Konrad Witz, 1435)

Kasten-brust armour (German: Kastenbrust – "box-shaped breast") is a German form of plate armour from the first half of the 15th century.

Kasten-brust armour was a style of early gothic armour widely used in the Holy Roman Empire. Typical harness construction consisted of a grand-bascinet helm or a bicoque helmet, box-shaped cuirass, gauntlets with a long cuff and a rectangular cutout, and a plate skirt known as a tonlet. Only four verified breastplates are known to have survived until today and are housed in Kelvingrove Museum in Glasgow, the Metropolitan Museum of Art in New York, German Historical Museum in Berlin, and the Vienna Museum of Vienna.

Kasten-brust armour is widely represented in paintings and statues of the first half of the 15th century. A style featuring a sharp ridge at the apex of the breastplate first appeared in art during the first decade of the 15th century. By 1420, a more rounded shape began to appear in art, sometimes with fluted embellishments. This style did not necessarily supplant the earlier style, as both varieties appear alongside each other in the lower left panel of the Ghent Altarpiece, which was completed in 1432. The style fell out of widespread use in most of Europe by 1450, however frescoes found in Gierslev Sogn indicate that the style remained in use in Denmark into the last quarter of the 15th century.

== Gallery ==
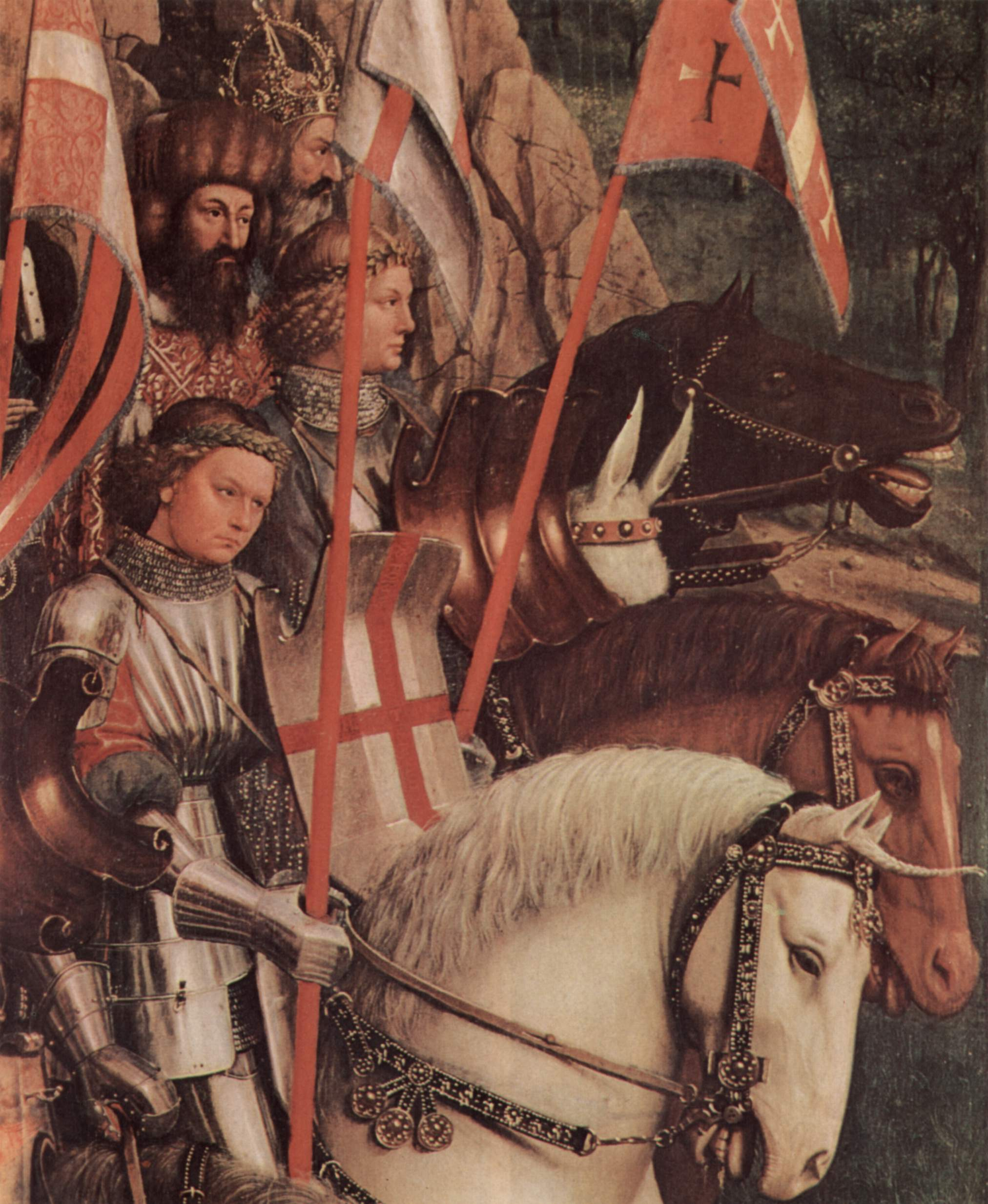
Knights in kasten-brust armours (altar of Saint Bavo's Cathedral, Ghent by Jan van Eyck, 1427–30)

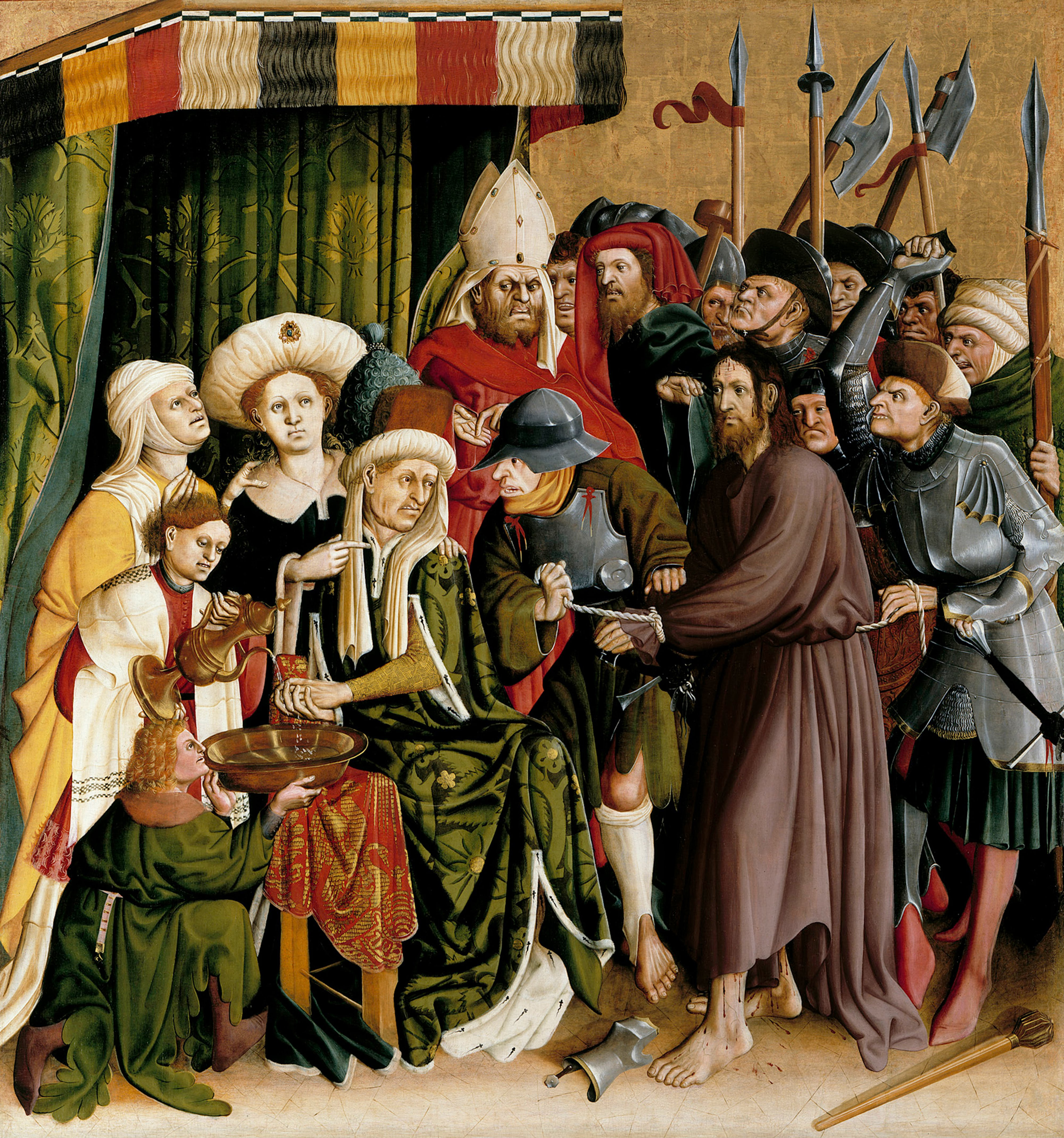
Soldiers wearing kasten-brust armours (Wurzacher Altar by Hans Multscher, 1437)

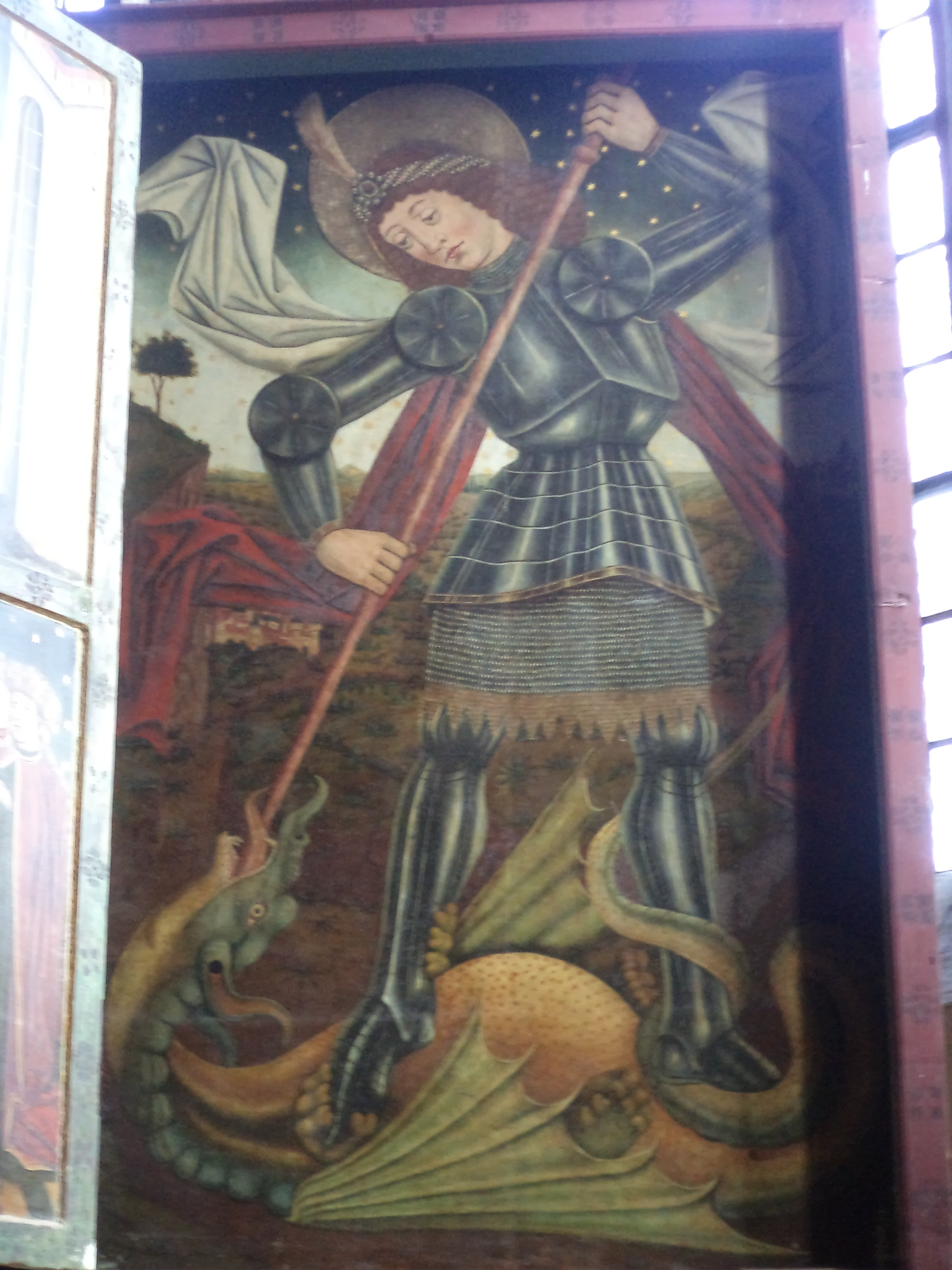
Saint George portrayed wearing kasten-brust armour (winged altar of the Mălâncrav Fortified Church, c. 1469)

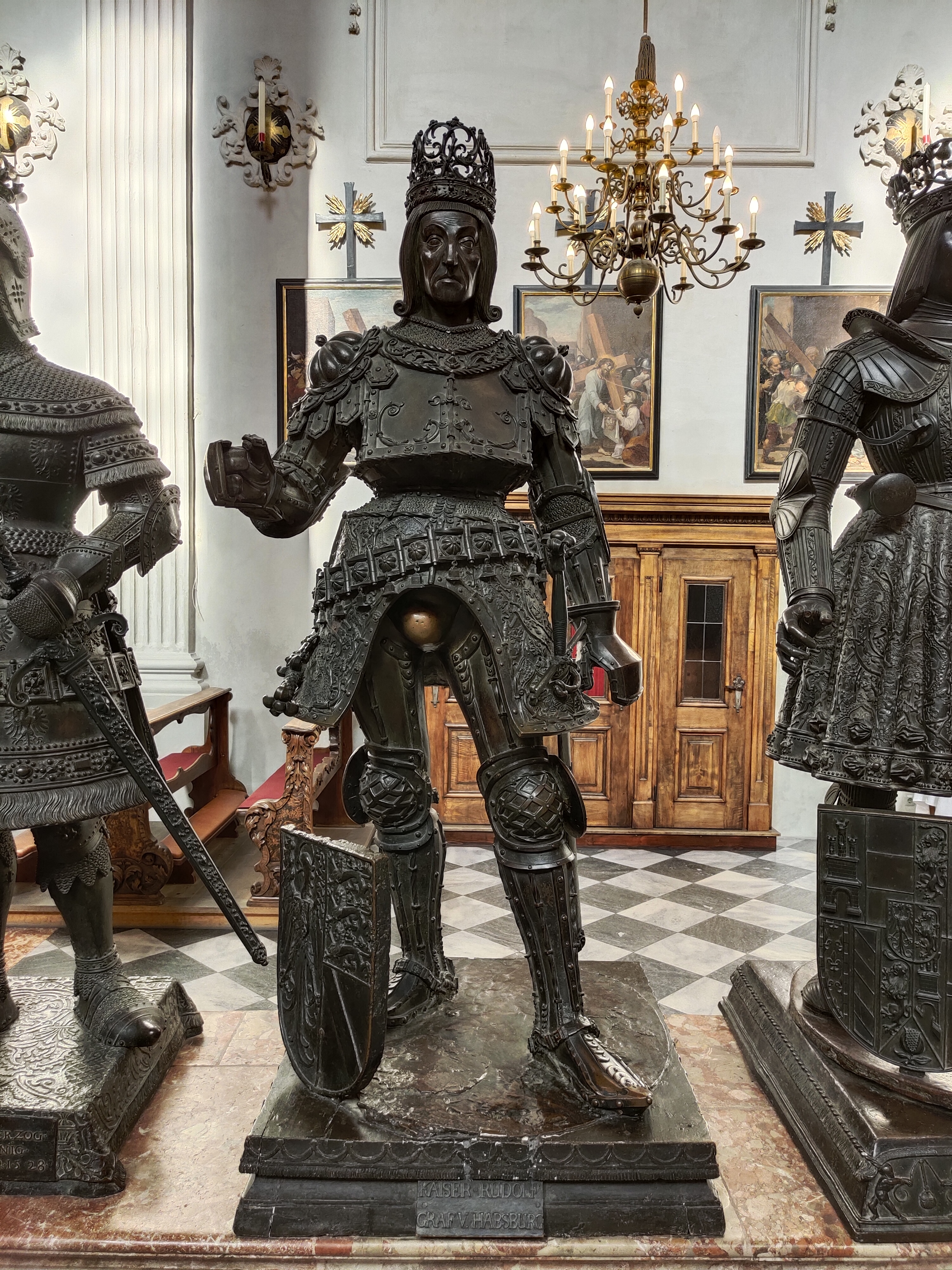
A statue of Rudolf I from the Great Ancient Kings Kenotath in Innsbruck (Hofkirche), one of several examples of kasten-brust armour worn by the statues within Maximilian's tomb, this particular example displaying anachronism
