= Gothic plate armour =

15th century European steel plate armour

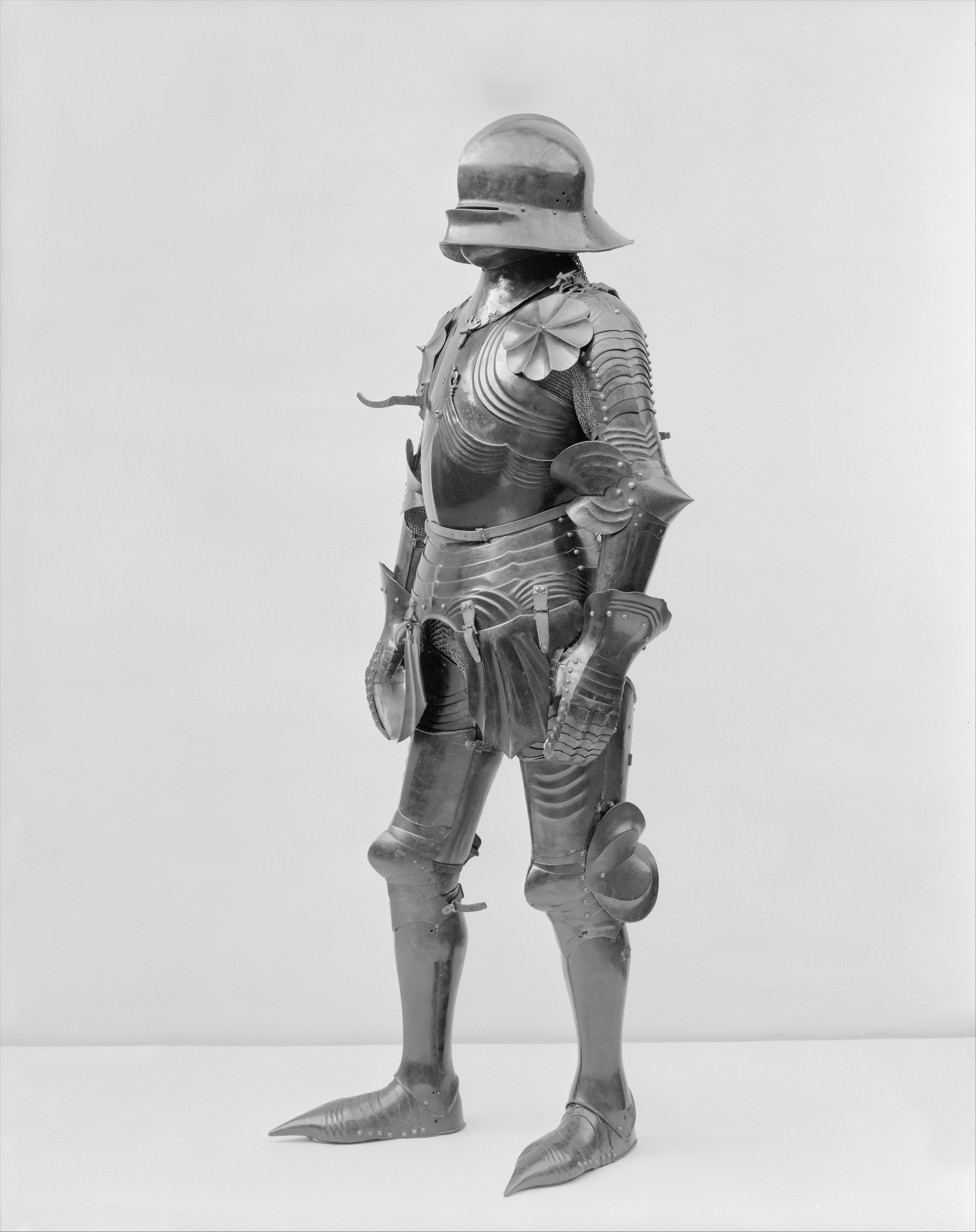
15th-century armour on display at the Metropolitan Museum of Art

Gothic plate armour (German: Gotischer Plattenpanzer) was the type of steel plate armour made in the Holy Roman Empire during the 15th century.

== History ==
While the term "Gothic" in art history covers the 12th to 15th centuries, Gothic plate armour develops only during 1420–1440s, when the technological development of armour reached the stage where full plate armour (including movable joints) was made, and national styles of "white armour" began to emerge, specifically German ("Gothic") and Italian (Milanese). Centers of armour production in the period included Augsburg, Nuremberg and Landshut.

The Gothic style of plate armour peaked in a form known as Maximilian armour, produced during 1515–1525. High Gothic armour was worn during the later 15th century, a transitional type called Schott-Sonnenberg style was current during c. 1500 to 1515, and Maximilian armour proper during 1515 to 1525. Towards the late 16th century, so-called half-armour (Halbharnisch) would become increasingly common, eventually diminished itself into the early modern cuirass of the 18th and 19th centuries.

Gothic armour was often combined with a Gothic sallet, which included long and sharp rear-plate that protected the back of the neck and head. Maximilian armour of the early 16th century is characterized by rounder and more curved forms, and their ridges were narrower, parallel to each other and covered the entire armour.

Methods of single combat in this type of armour are treated in the German fencing manuals of the period, under the term Harnischfechten ("armoured combat").

== Gallery ==
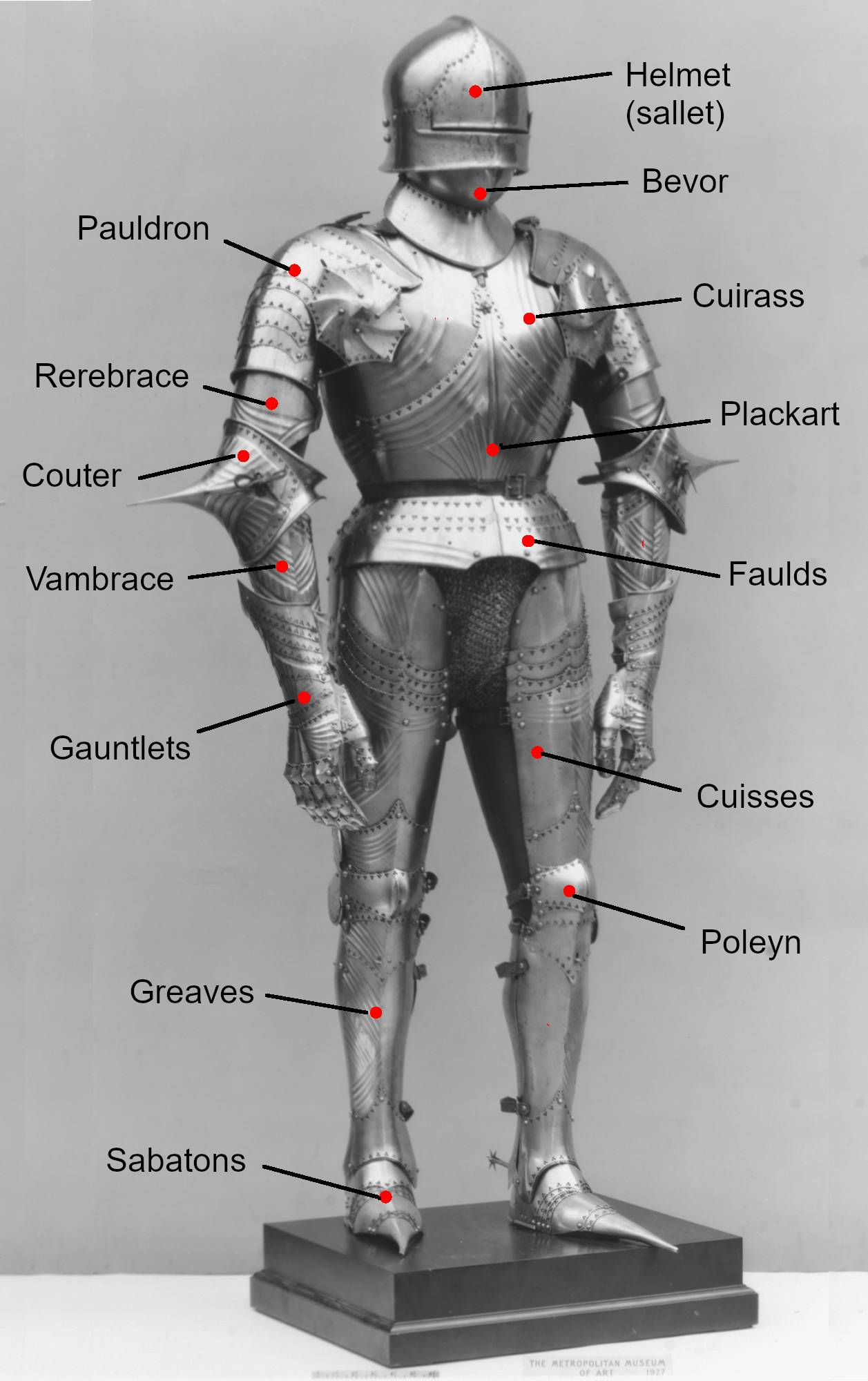
Breakdown of individual components of Gothic armour

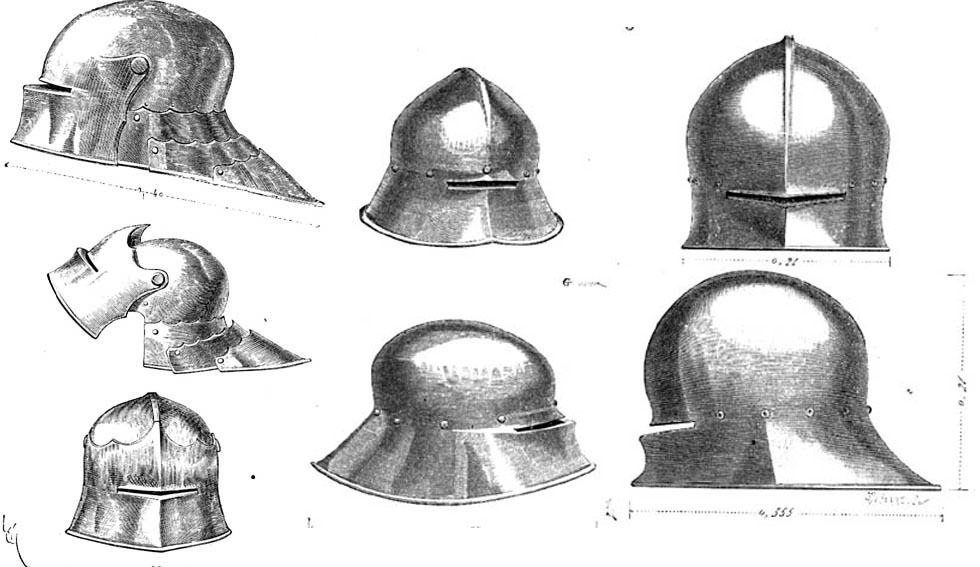
Gothic helmets, illustration by Viollet Le-Duc

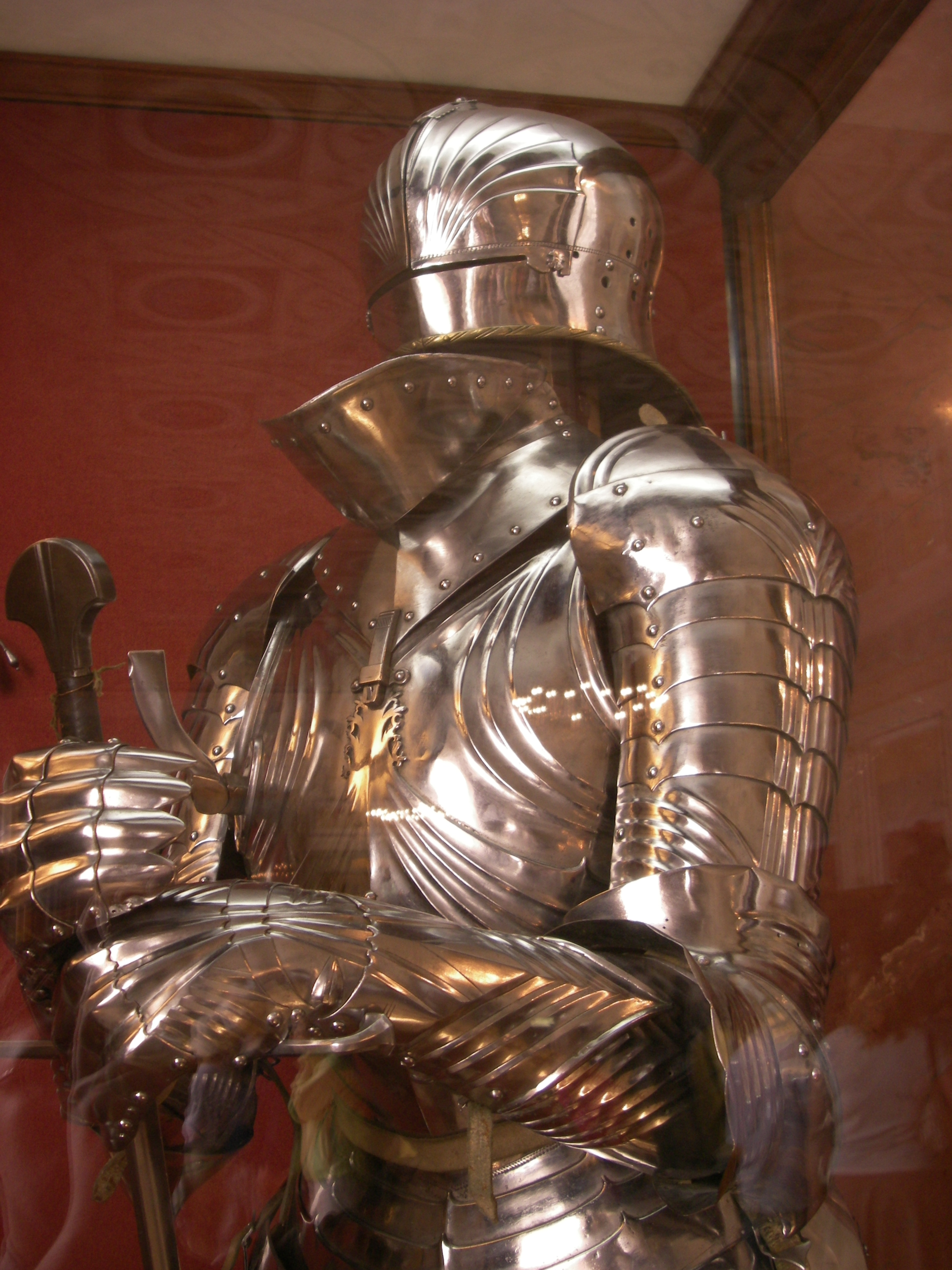
Close-up on Gothic armour, flutes and ridges are visible along the armour

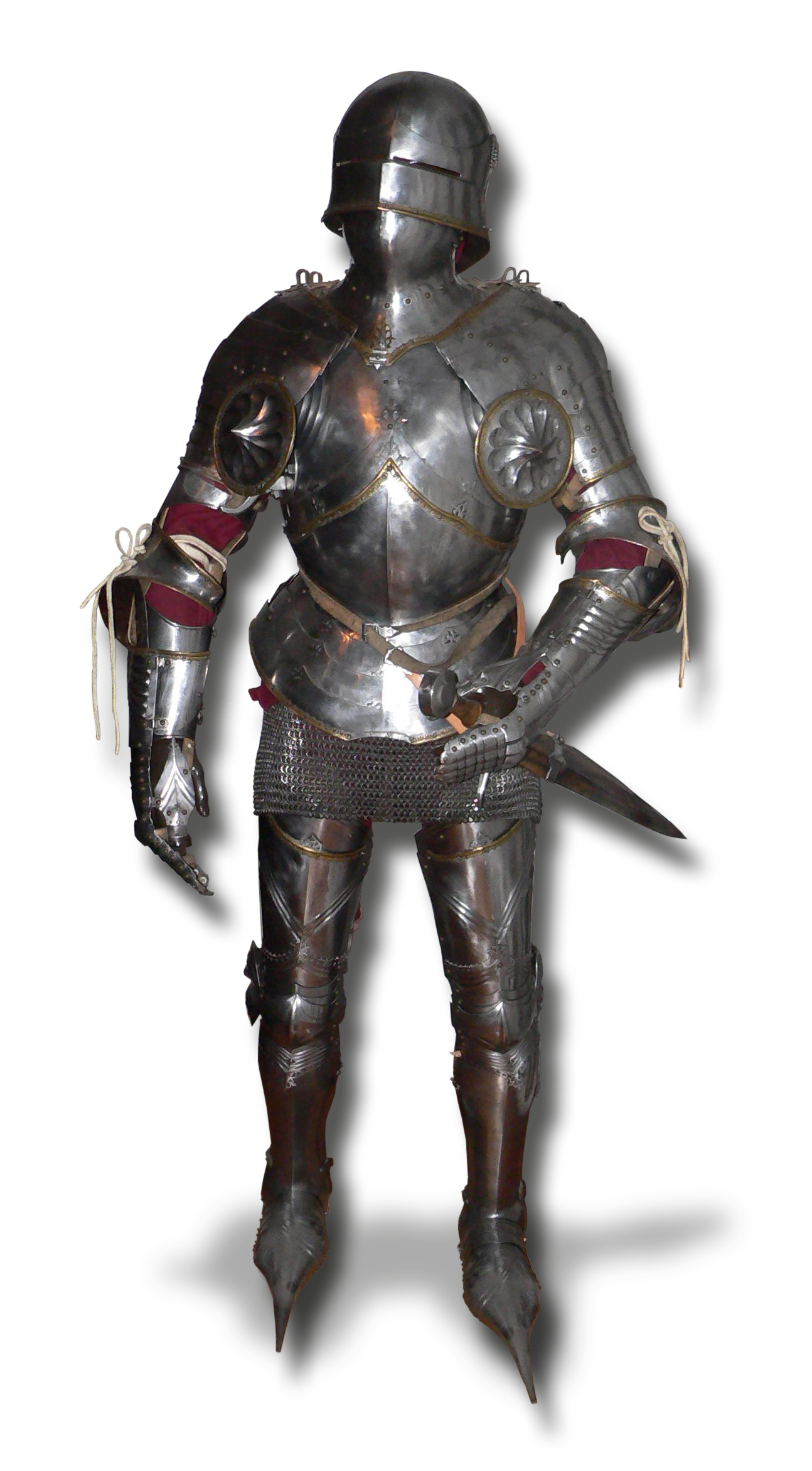
Maximilian Gothic armour

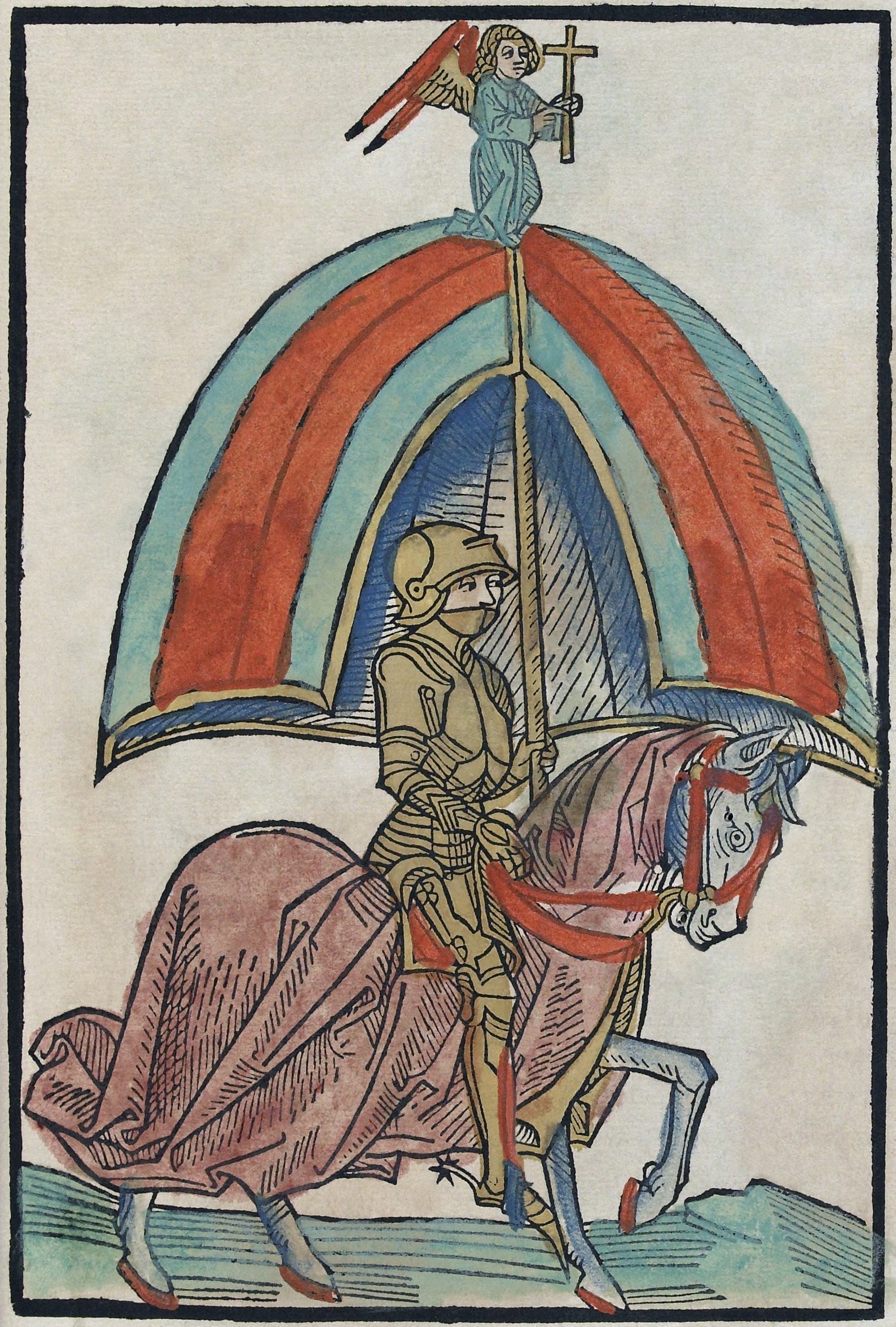
Gothic plate armour, from a German book illustration published 1483

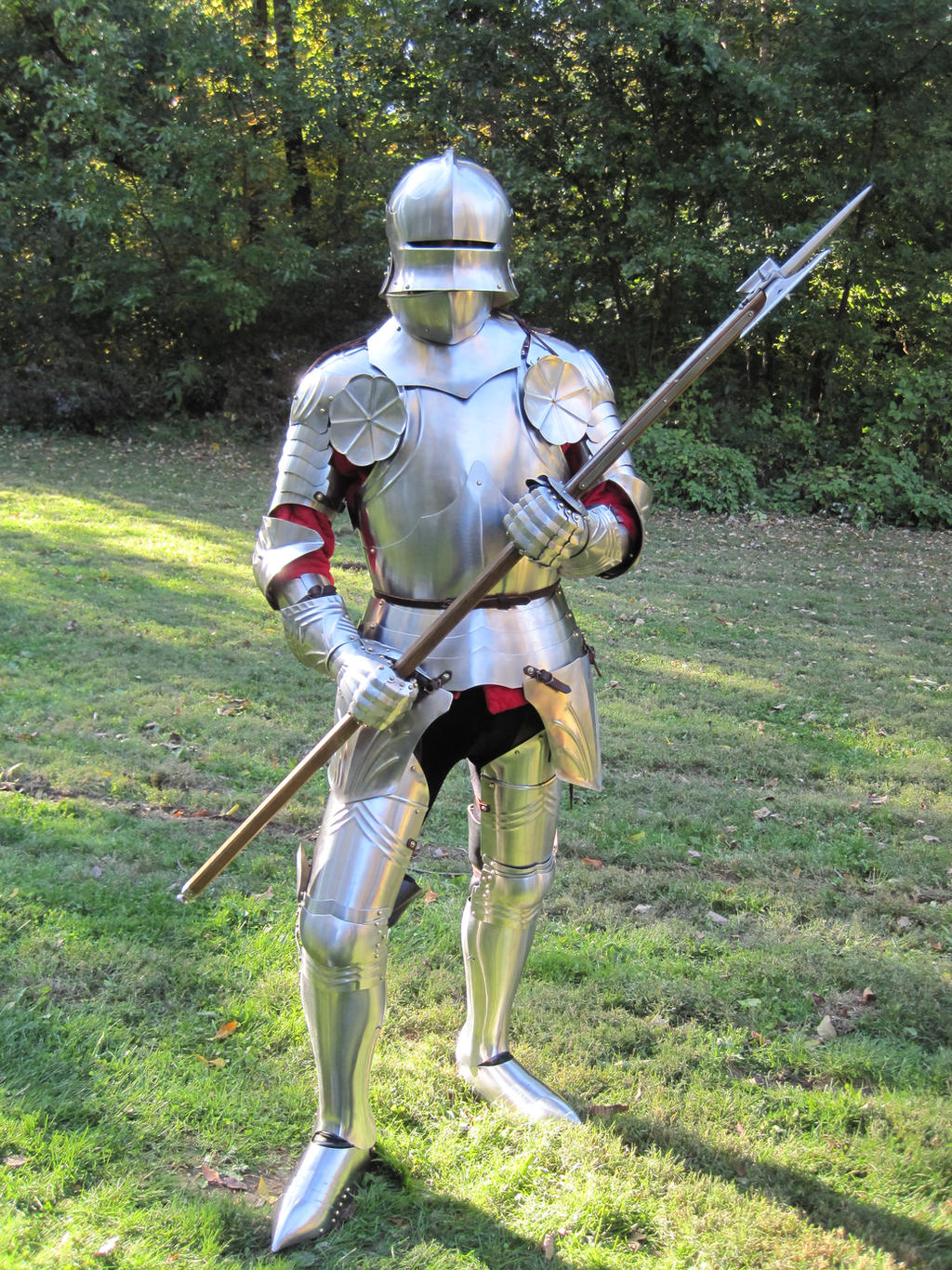
Replica with pollaxe

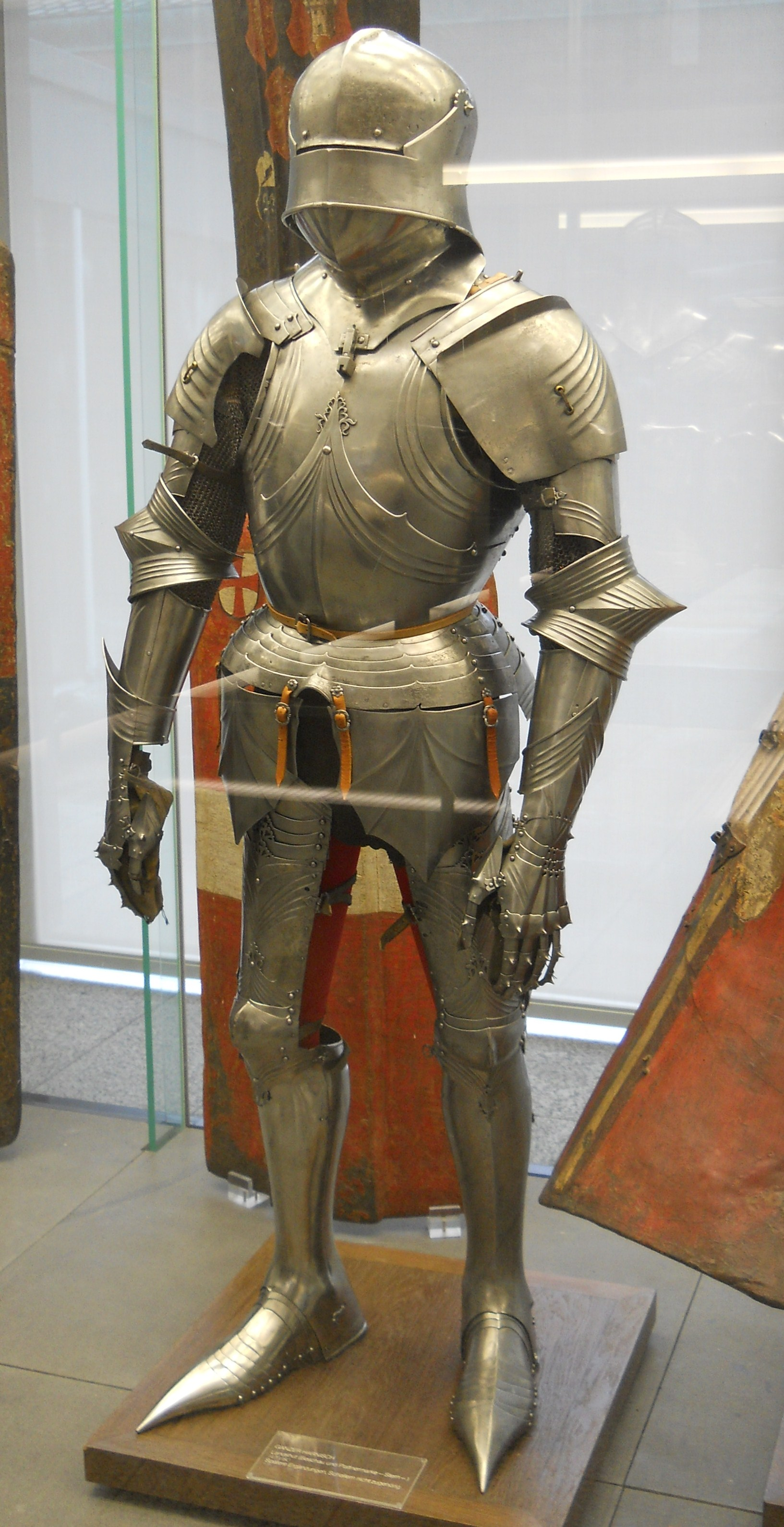

== See also ==
- Greenwich armour
- Almain rivet

== Bibliography ==
- Blackmore, Howard L., Arms and Armour, London 1965.
- Blair, Claude, European Armour circa 1066 to circa 1700, 3rd ed London 1979.
- Boeheim, Wendelin, Meister der Waffenschmiedekunst vom XIV. bis ins XVIII. Jahrhundert. Ein Beitrag zur Geschichte der Kunst und des Kunsthandwerks, Berlin 1897
- Closs, G. Adolf, "Der Harnisch der Übergangszeit von der Gotik zur Renaissance (1495-1520)", Zeitschrift für Historische Waffen- und Kostümkunde 3 (1930), 145-151.
- Gamber, Ortwin, "Harnischstudien V. Stilgeschichte des Plattenharnisches von den Anfängen bis um 1440", Jahrbuch der Kunsthistorischen Sammlungen in Wien 50 (1953)
- Gamber, Ortwin, "Harnischstudien VI. Stilgeschichte des Plattenharnisches von 1440-1510", Jahrbuch der Kunsthistorischen Sammlungen in Wien (1965), 31-102.
- von Kern, Georg, Die Stilentwicklung des Riefelharnisches Diss. München 1982.
- Lauts, Jan, Alte deutsche Waffen, Burg bei Magdeburg 1938.
- Mann, James G., The Etched Decoration of Armour, London 1962.
- Martin, Paul, Waffen und Rüstungen von Karl dem Großen bis zu Ludwig XIV., Fribourg 1967.
- Müller, Heinrich, Historische Waffen. Kurze Entwicklungsgeschichte der Waffen vom Frühfeudalismus bis zum 17. Jahrhundert, Berlin 1957.
- Oakeshott, Ewart (1980). European Weapons and Armour from the Renaissance to the Industrial Revolution. Guildford and London: Lutterworth Press. pp. 75–108. ISBN 9780718821265.
- Spitzelberger, Georg, Unvergängliche Harnischkunst. Beiträge zur historischen Waffenkunde, Landshut 1985.
- Thomas, Bruno, Deutsche Plattnerkunst, München 1944.
- Thomas, Bruno, Gesammelte Schriften zur historischen Waffenkunde, 2 vols, Graz 1977.
- Willers, Johannes, "Nürnberger Harnische" in: Nürnberg 1300-1550. Kunst der Gotik und Renaissance, München 1986.
