= Linothorax =

Type of armor from ancient Greece

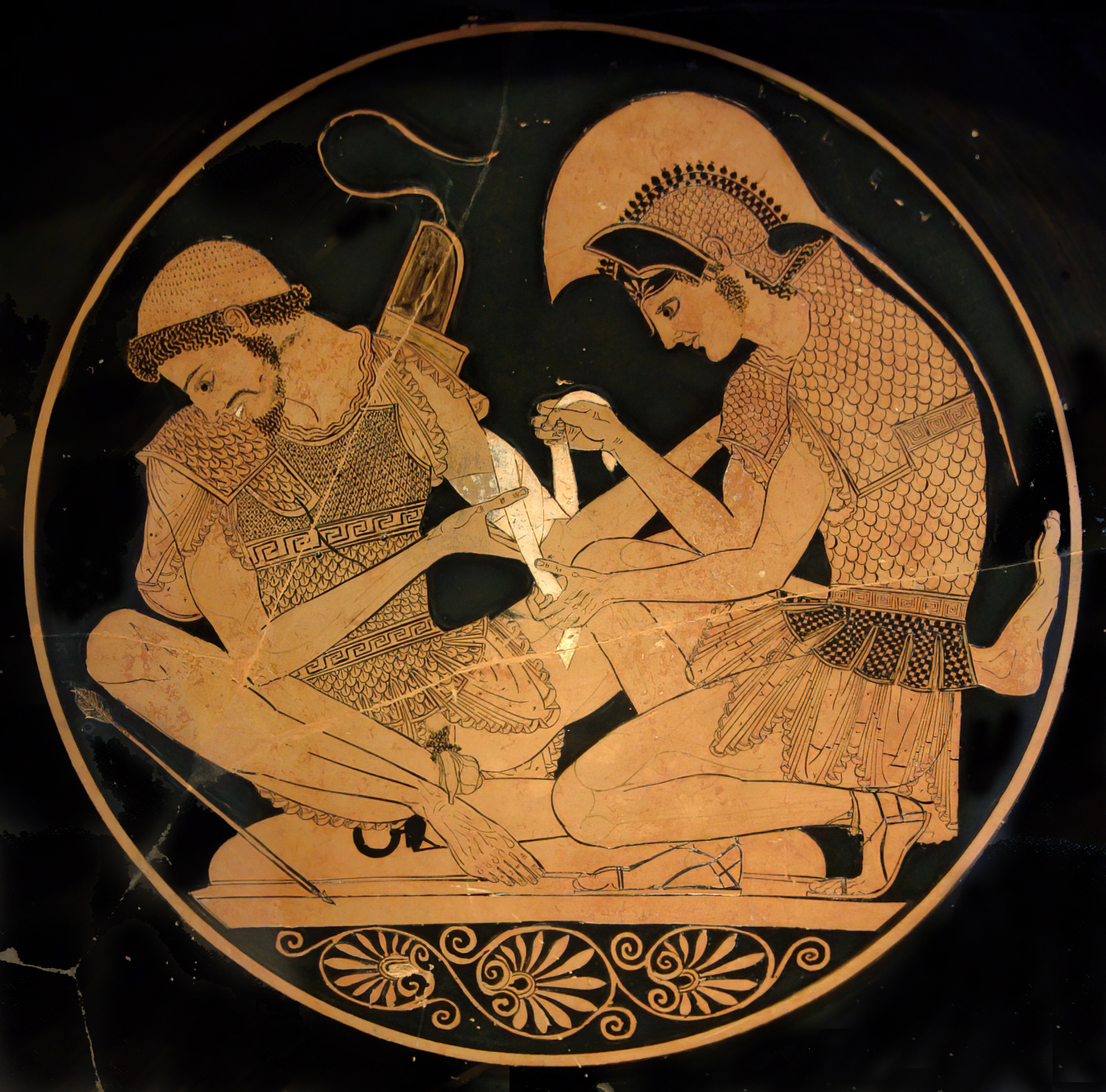
Achilles heals Patroclus, since he learned the arts of medicine from his tutor, Chiron. Both men are believed to be wearing linothoraxes. attic red-figure kylix, signed by Sosias, c. 500 BC, Antikensammlung Berlin (F 2278)

The linothorax (/ˈliːnoʊθɔːræks/, from the Ancient Greek: λινοθώραξ, Ancient Greek: [linotʰɔ̌ːraːks]) is a type of upper body armor that was used throughout the ancient Mediterranean world. The term linothorax is a modern term based on the Greek λινοθώραξ, which means "wearing a breastplate of linen"; a number of ancient Greek and Latin texts from the 6th century BC to the third century AD mention θώρακες λίνεοι (thorakes lineoi) (Greek) or loricae linteae (Latin) which means 'linen body armour'. These are usually equated with some of the armour shown in sculptures and paintings from Italy and Greece from 575 BC onwards. Very little is known about how ancient linen armour was made. Linen armour in other cultures was usually quilted and stuffed with loose fibre or stitched together many layers thick, but it could also have been made with a special weave called twining which creates a thick, tough fabric. The theory that it was made of layers of linen glued together comes from a mistranslation of a summary of a description of medieval armour in 1869.

By the late 6th century BC, many paintings and sculptures show hoplites and other warriors in the Aegean wearing the linothorax instead of a bronze cuirass. This could have been due to the lower price, lesser weight, or cooler material. Artists continue to show it in the Hellenistic period after the death of Alexander the Great. The Roman emperor Caracalla equipped a "Macedonian phalanx" with linen armour around 200 AD (Cassius Dio 78.7).

It is entirely possible that the various sources depict some form of metal armour with an external covering of linen very similar to the later medieval brigandines, whose day-to-day practicality of use over plate armour made them popular while out on campaigns.

== History ==
Some scholars believe that Homer refers to a linothorax when he describes Ajax the Lesser as "linen-breasted" (Iliad 2.529 and 2.830). Other scholars believe that this refers to a linen tunic or smooth glossy skin.

The first clear reference to linen armour in any ancient language is a line by the poet Alcaeus, who lived around 650–550 BC. From the fifth century BC to the first century AD, Greek and Roman writers mention soldiers from many nations wearing linen armour, but they rarely describe it in detail. These writers include Herodotus (2.182, 3.47, 7.63), Livy (4.19.2–20.7), Strabo (Geography, 3.3.6, 13.1.10), Suetonius (Galba 19.1), and Pausanias. The philosopher Plutarch says that Alexander the Great wore a "double linen breastplate" at the battle of Gaugamela (Plutarch, Life of Alexander 32.8–12). References to linen armour become much rarer in the Roman imperial period. It seems likely that as the Roman army developed cheap forms of iron armour such as the lorica hamata, there was less demand for linen armour.

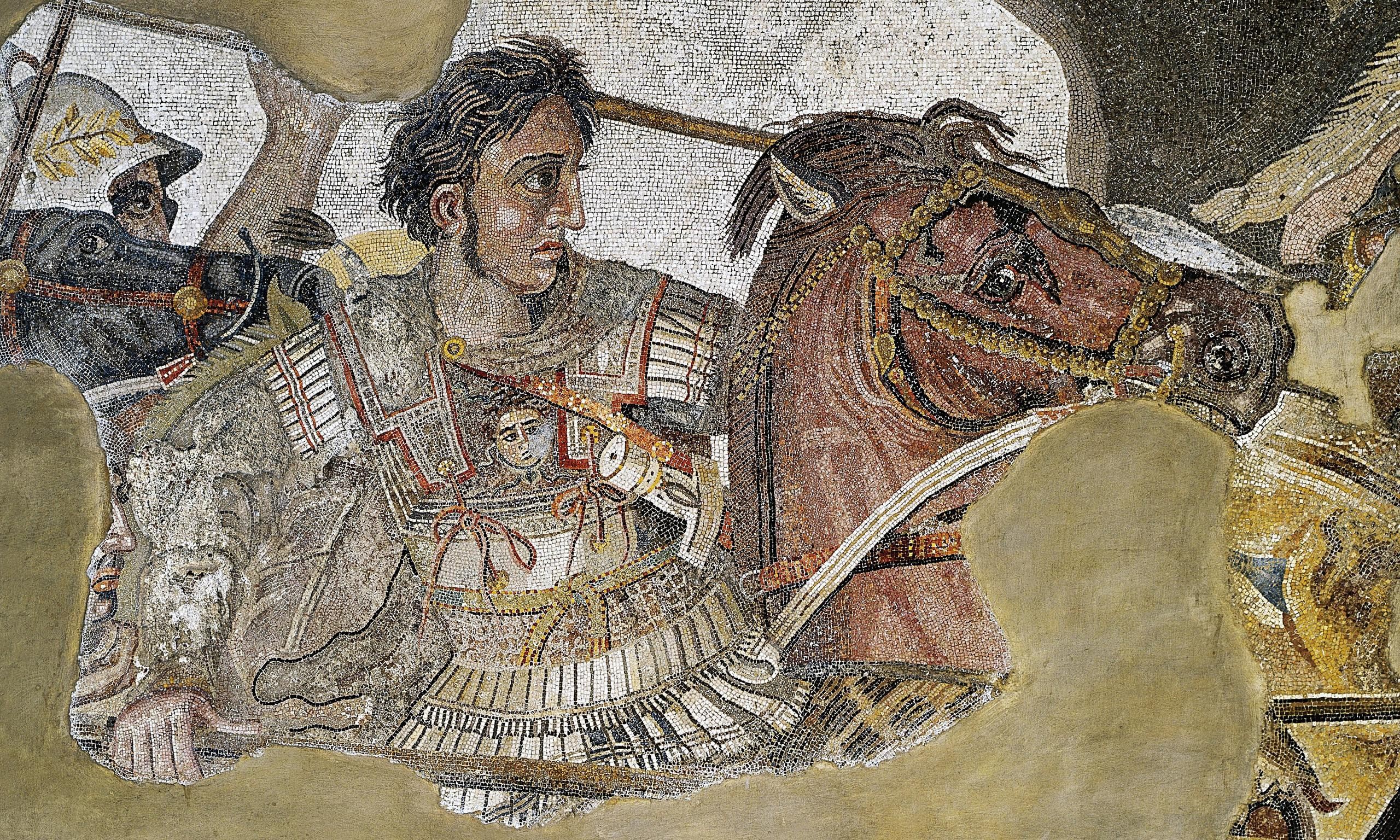
The Alexander Mosaic of Pompeii, depicting Alexander the Great, king of Macedon, wearing a linothorax

Beginning around 575 BC, artists in the Aegean often show a distinctive style of armour with a smooth piece wrapped around the chest, two flaps over the shoulders, and a skirt of flaps covering the hips and belly. By the 4th century BC, armour with a similar shape appears in wall paintings in Italy, sealstones in Persia, gold combs in Crimea, and stone carvings in Gaul. Because only a few examples of armour shaped like this survive, researchers such as Peter Connolly identify the lost armour with the linen armour in texts. Linen would decay and so leave little archaeological evidence. On the Alexander Sarcophagus and Alexander Mosaic, Alexander the Great and his soldiers wear this type of armour. Artists of the Roman imperial period rarely show this type of armour. The extant armour with this shape are made of iron plate, iron scales, or iron mail, and so the armour which decayed was likely made of more than one material.

== Depictions ==
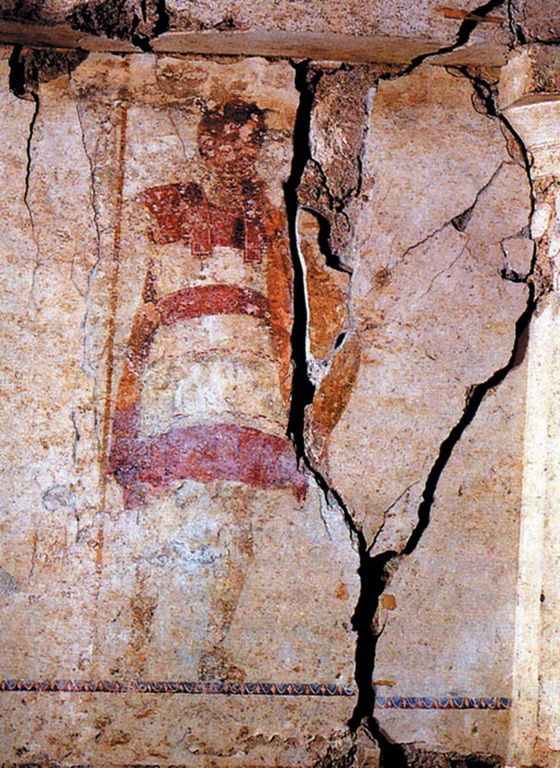
Painted depiction of a soldier wearing the linothorax, from the Tomb of Judgement in Mieza in Imathia, Greece, 4th/3rd century BC

Since this armour is only known through texts, paintings, and sculptures, rather than archaeological finds, modern scholars can only guess at its makeup and design. Artistic depictions show armor that has a top piece which covers the shoulders and is tied down on the chest, a main body piece wrapping around the wearer and covering the chest from the waist up, and a row of pteruges or flaps around the bottom which cover the belly and hips. Vase paintings from Athens often show scales covering part of the armour. A team of researchers at the University of Wisconsin–Green Bay led by Professor Emeritus Gregory S. Aldrete have catalogued art from Italy and the Aegean which shows this armour. Five extant pieces of armour shaped like the armour in Athenian vase paintings survive from sites in south-eastern Europe from the 4th century BC to the 1st century AD. Two are of iron plate, one is of iron scales on a leather foundation, and two are of mail interwoven with scales. Some of the linen armour in ancient texts was probably shaped the same way, but how this ancient linen armour was made is unknown.

== Research ==
Modern researchers have had difficulty studying ancient linen armour because linen is biodegradable and leaves few remains for archeologists to discover. It is also entirely possible that this type of armour never existed in the form described here and so can never be found, with the representations instead showing something similar to a bronze brigandine or coat of plates, with the linen as an external integral material holding the plates underneath in place. This would also help insulate the metal plates from the elements, and protect against grit and dust.

Throughout history, many cultures from India to Scotland to South America have made "linen" armour by quilting many layers of fabrics such as canvas or leather together or stuffing them with loose fibres such as cotton. The type stuffed with loose fibres often looks bumpy and unlike the ancient art, but the type of many layers of cloth can be smooth. Textile archaeologist Hero Granger-Taylor proposes that ancient linen armour was woven using a special technique called twining. Twined textiles were used in military contexts in Bronze Age Egypt, Roman Syria, and Maori New Zealand, so it is plausible that they were also used in Classical Greece and Italy before the Roman conquest.

In the 1970s, Peter Connolly built a linothorax by gluing layers of linen cloth together and cutting them to shape. His reconstruction inspired many others, including one by Professor Emeritus Gregory S. Aldrete and his student Scott Bartell at University of Wisconsin-Green Bay. This project was present at the joint American Philological Association/Archaeological Institute of America Convention held in Philadelphia, Pennsylvania in January 2009, and published in a book from Johns Hopkins University Press in 2013. The project received considerable media attention after Aldrete tested his construction by shooting an arrow at Bartell with cameras rolling. But Peter Connolly's reconstruction was based on a misremembered, twice-translated summary of a Byzantine chronicle which did not mention glue, not on an ancient text, artifact, or depiction. No culture before the 20th century is known to have made linen armor in this way.

== See also ==
- Gambeson
- Ichcahuipilli
- Kevlar
- Muscle cuirass
