= Gregory S. Aldrete =

American academic

Gregory S. Aldrete (born 1966) is an American classical historian. He is a professor emeritus of history and humanistic studies at the University of Wisconsin–Green Bay.

== Academic career ==
He was the Frankenthal Professor of History and Humanities at the University of Wisconsin–Green Bay, where he had been teaching since 1995. His emphasis is on rhetoric and oratory, floods in Rome, ancient Greek and Roman history, and daily life in the Roman world. He earned his A.B. degree cum laude in History from Princeton University in 1988, and his M.A. degree in 1993 and Ph.D. in 1995, both in Ancient History from the University of Michigan. Aldrete speaks Latin, ancient Greek, Spanish, and can read texts in Italian, French, and German.

== Books ==
Aldrete has written the books Gestures and Acclamations in Ancient Rome, Floods of the Tiber in Ancient Rome, The Encyclopedia of Daily Life in the Ancient World, Daily Life in the Ancient Roman City: Rome, Pompeii, and Ostia, The Long Shadow of Antiquity: What Have the Greeks and Romans Done for Us? (with Alicia Aldrete), and Reconstructing Ancient Linen Body Armor: Unraveling the Linothorax Mystery (with Scott Bartell and Alicia Aldrete).

== Research ==
Aldrete has conducted research on a type of ancient cloth body armor (sometimes called a linothorax). Aldrete is a member of the Phaeton Group, serving as the group's ancient historian, as well as its secretary and treasurer.

Aldrete's interdisciplinary approach to the study of the ancient world, which he incorporates into his lectures, has earned him fellowships. Apart from numerous research trips to Italy, Aldrete has studied Vatican Library manuscripts.

== Educational videos ==
He has made six educational video courses with The Great Courses. He has contributed detailed courses on Roman history, a study of the general history of the Ancient World with a global perspective, courses on the decisive military battles and military blunders in world history, and a short course on modern movies and TV set in ancient Rome or that use Roman themes. He has contributed 6 such courses as of January 2020.

== Awards ==
Aldrete has received multiple awards for his teaching, including the Regents Teaching Excellence Award from the University of Wisconsin System Board of Regents in 2015, was named Wisconsin Professor of the Year by the Carnegie Foundation for the Advancement of Teaching and the Council for the Advancement and Support of Education, and was given the 2009 national teaching award for teaching at the collegiate level by the Society for Classical Studies (formerly the American Philological Association).
