= Cuirass =

Type of armour that covers the torso

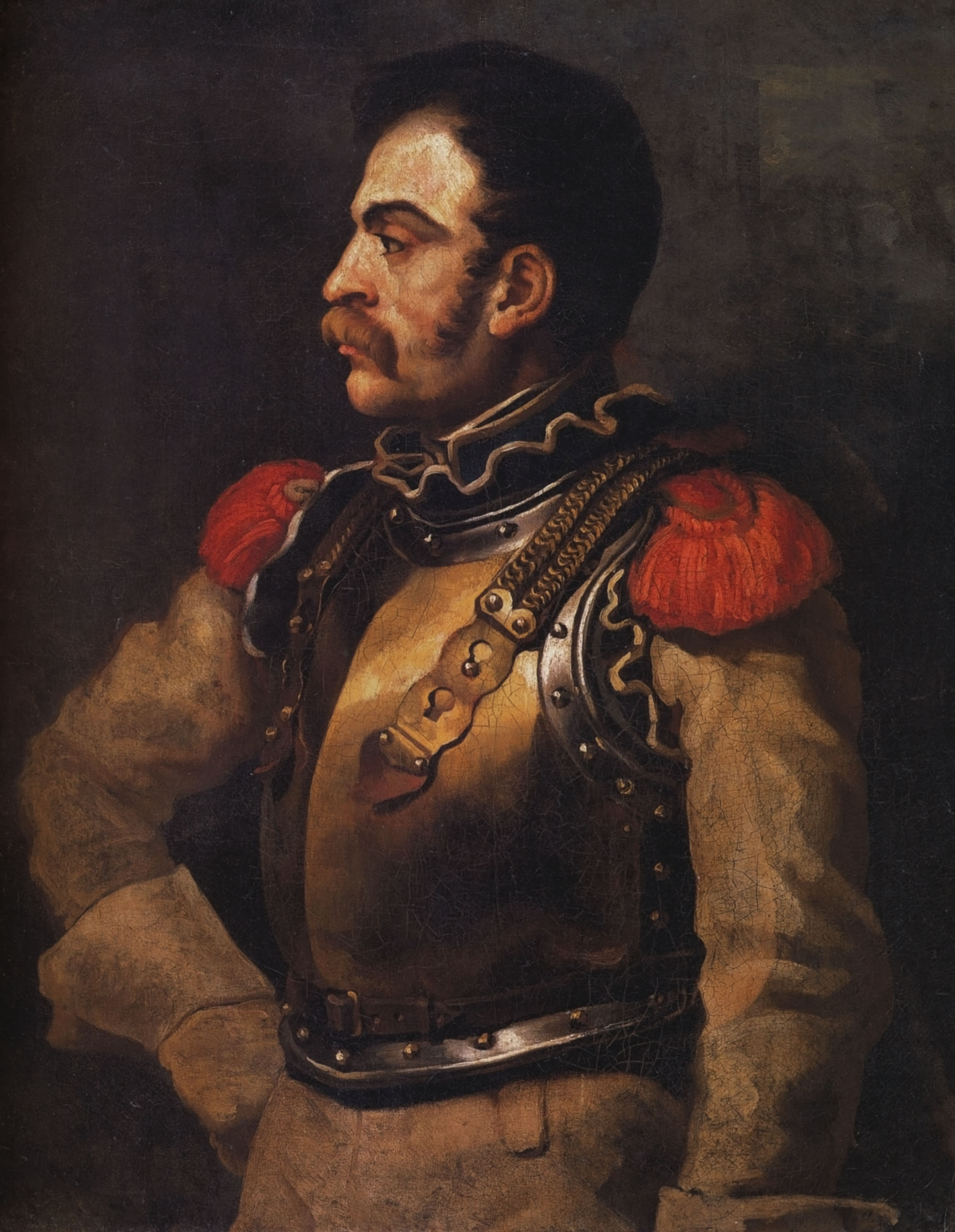
Cuirass worn by a Carabinier-à-Cheval

A cuirass (/kwɪˈræs, kjʊəˈræs/ kwih-RASS, kyuu-RASS; French: cuirasse; Latin: coriaceus) is a piece of armour that covers the torso, formed of one or more pieces of metal or other rigid material.

The term originates from the original material, leather, from the Old French word cuirace and the Latin word coriacea. The use of the term cuirass generally refers to both the breastplate and the backplate pieces; whereas a breastplate protects only the front, a cuirass protects both the front and the back of the wearer.

== Description ==
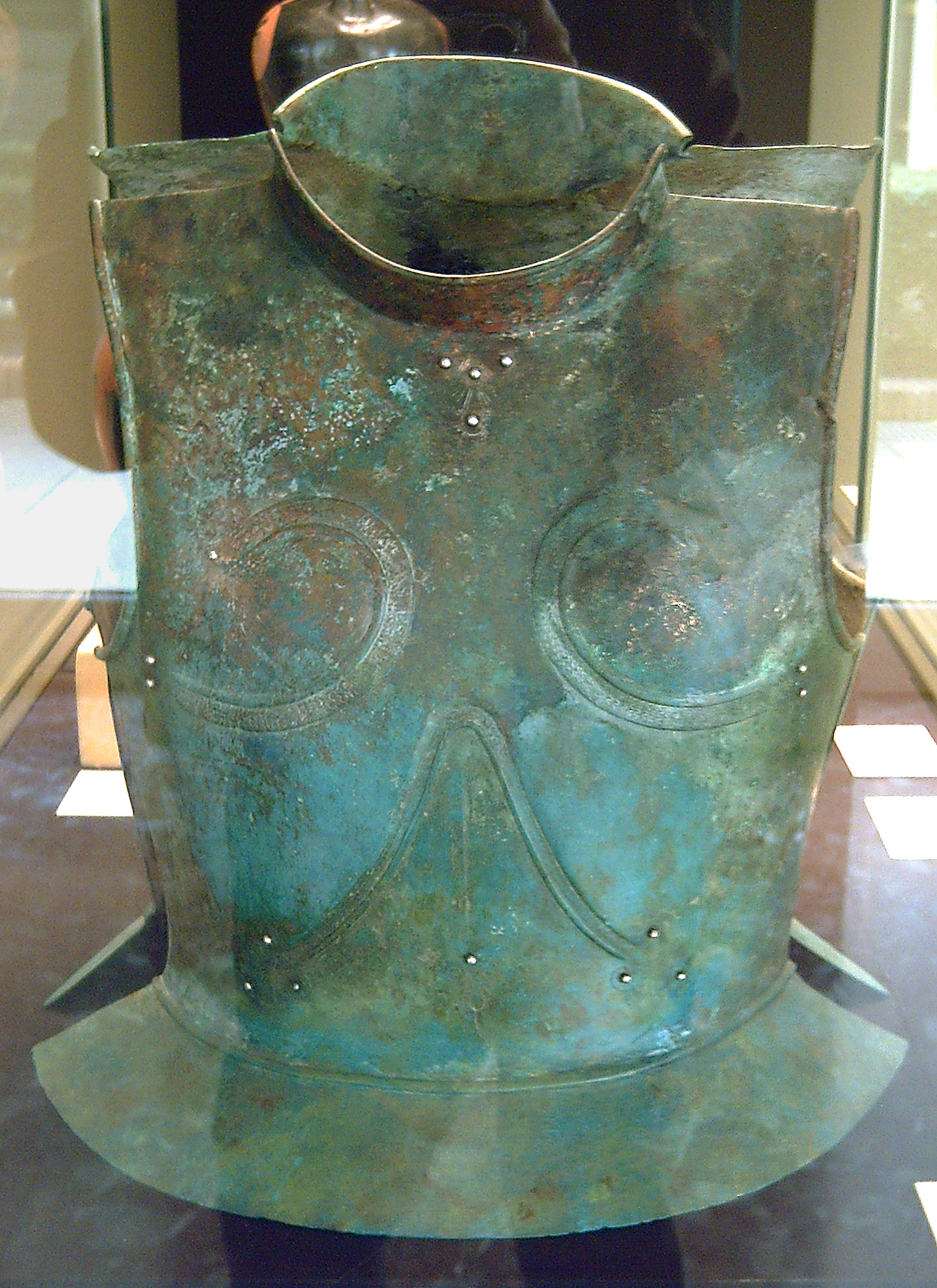
An Ancient Greek bronze cuirass, dated between 620 and 580 BC

In Hellenistic and Roman times, the musculature of the male torso was idealized in the form of the muscle cuirass or "heroic cuirass" (in French the cuirasse esthétique) sometimes further embellished with symbolic representation in relief, familiar in the Augustus of Prima Porta and other heroic representations in official Roman sculpture. As parts of the actual military equipment of classical antiquity, cuirasses and corsets of bronze, iron, or some other rigid substance were used. Secondary protection for the breast was worn in earlier times by men-at-arms in addition to mail hauberks and reinforced coats. It was not until the 14th century that the plate armour became an established part of medieval armour.

== History ==
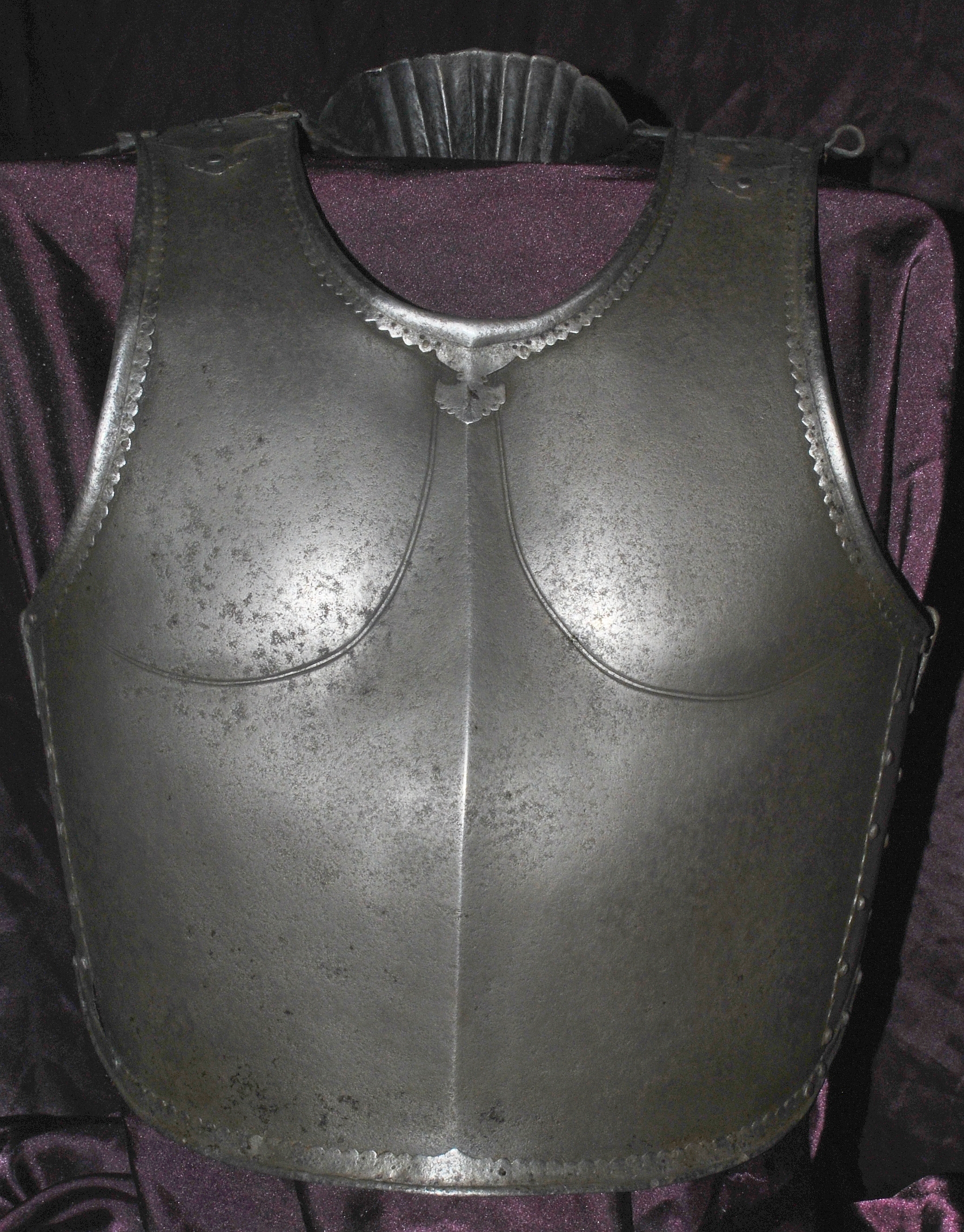
Indian steel cuirass, 17th to 18th century

The Roman emperor Galba donned a cuirass just before he went to his death. Suetonius records in 12 Caesars that, "As [Galba] was offering sacrifice on the morning before he was killed, a soothsayer warned him again and again to look out for danger, since assassins were not far off. Not long after this he learned that Otho held possession of the camp, and when several advised him to proceed thither as soon as possible – for they said that he could win the day by his presence and prestige – he decided to do no more than hold his present position and strengthen it by getting together a guard of the legionaries, who were encamped in many different quarters of the city. He did however put on a linen cuirass, though he openly declared that it would afford little protection against so many swords."

The latter portion of the 14th century saw the cuirass gradually come into general use in connection with plate armour for the limbs until, at the close of the century, mail was phased out among the nobles (e.g., knights) except in the camail of the bascinet and at the edge of the hauberk. The cuirass was almost universally worn throughout its lifespan as a form of armour. The globule form of the breast-armour of the Black Prince, in his effigy in Canterbury Cathedral, 1376, intimates that a cuirass (as well as a hauberk) is to be considered to have been covered by the royalty-emblazoned jupon (surcoat) of the Prince.

Historical cuirass, contrary to many modern reproductions, did not rest on the hips. Historical cuirass usually stopped somewhere around the midriff or navel in order to allow a sufficient range of movement to the wearer. A cuirass ending at the waist would severely limit the ability of the wearer to lean forward, backward, or sideways. Thus, to protect the rest of the torso, mail, or fauld were used, depending on the time period.

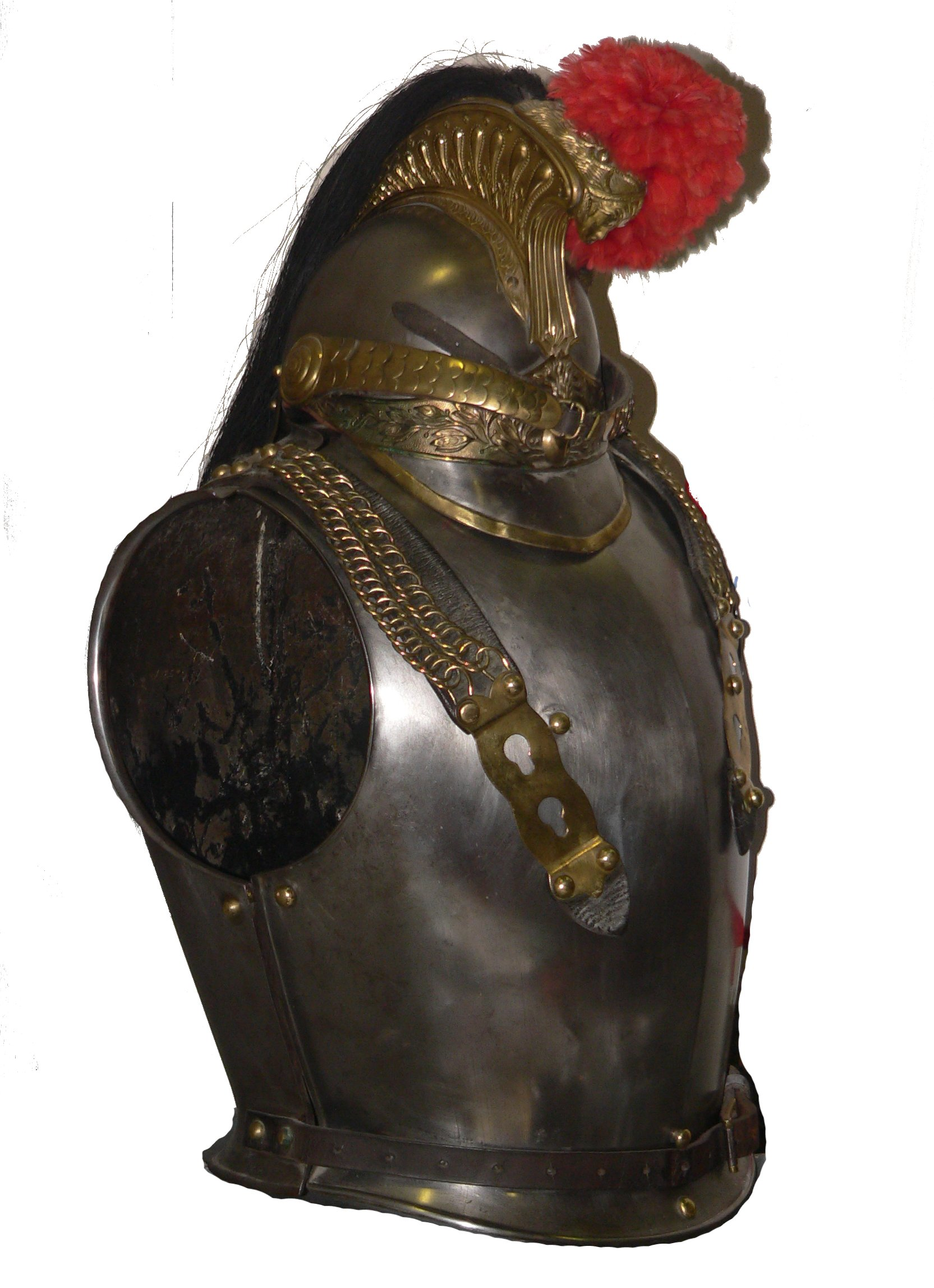
M1872 helmet and M1855 cuirass worn by the French cuirassiers

Early in the 15th century, plate armour, including the cuirass, began to be worn without any surcoat; but in the concluding quarter of the century the short surcoat, with full short sleeves, known as a "tabard", was in general use over the armour. While the surcoat was being phased out, small plates of various forms and sizes (and not always made in pairs, i.e., the plate for the sword-arm often being smaller and lighter than the one for the off-hand) were attached to the armour in front of the shoulders, to defend the otherwise vulnerable points where the plate defenses left a gap.

About the middle of the 15th century, the breastplate of the cuirass was made in two parts; the lower adjusted to overlap the upper, held together with a strap or sliding rivet in order to add flexibility to the advantages plate armour had over mail. In the second half of the 15th century, the cuirass was occasionally superseded by the brigandine jacket, the medieval forerunner of the flak jacket. In essence, the brigandine jacket was constructed of metal plates sewn into a fabric jacket. The fabric was generally a rich material, and was lined throughout with overlapping scales of metal which were attached to the jacket by rivets, having their heads, like studs, visible on the outside.

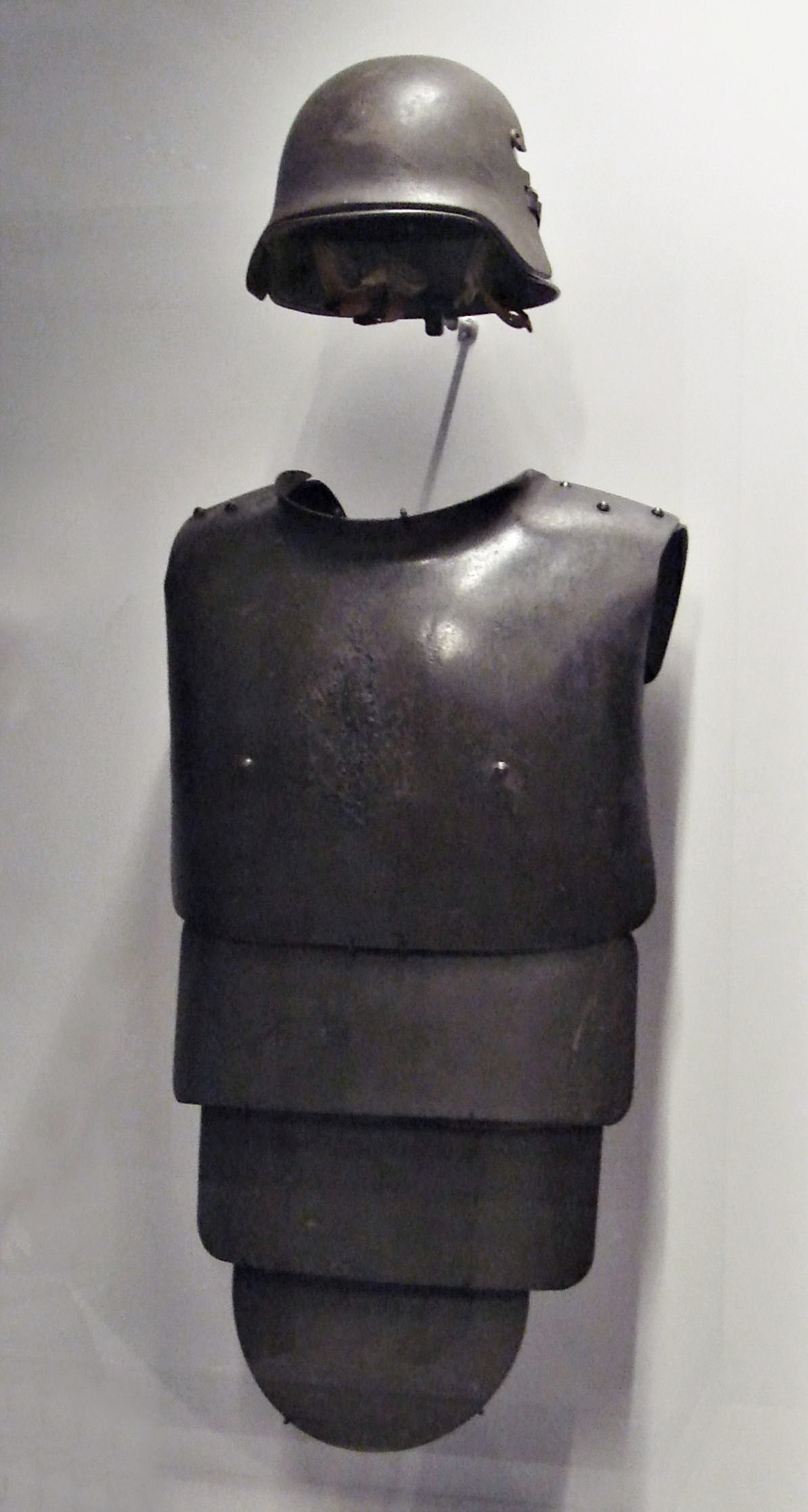
German helmet and frontal armoured plate for trench warfare, 1916

Around 1550, the breastplate piece of the cuirass was characterized by a vertical central ridge, called the tapul, having near its center a projecting point. Somewhat later, the tapul was moved lower on the breastplate. Eventually, the profile of the plate began to resemble a pea pod and, as such, was referred to as the peascod cuirass. During the English Civil War (1642–1651), only the wealthiest and physically strongest men could afford this type of armour.

Corslets, provided with both the breast and back pieces, were worn by foot-soldiers in the 17th century, while their mounted comrades were equipped with heavier and stronger cuirasses. These defenses continued in use longer than any other single piece of armour. Their use never altogether ceased and in modern armies mounted cuirassiers, armed with breast and back plates as in the earlier days, have, to some degree, emulated the martial splendour of the body armour of the era of medieval chivalry.

British, French, German, and Russian heavy cavalry wore cuirasses as part of their parade uniforms leading up to World War I. Although in the early part of the conflict, the French still wore their cuirasses into battle, for the most part they were covered with a cloth canvas for protection against the weather and to reduce enemy visibility, as well as their ornate neo-Roman style helmets. All other militaries had taken them out of combat use by World War II.

Some years after the Battle of Waterloo (1815), certain historical cuirasses were taken from their repose in the Tower of London and adapted for ceremonial service by the Life Guards and the Blues and Royals of the British Army's Household Cavalry.

For parade purposes, the Prussian Gardes du Corps and other corps wore cuirasses of richly decorated leather. The Pontifical Swiss Guard still wear cuirasses for swearing-in ceremonies, Christmas and Easter.

=== Japanese cuirass ===
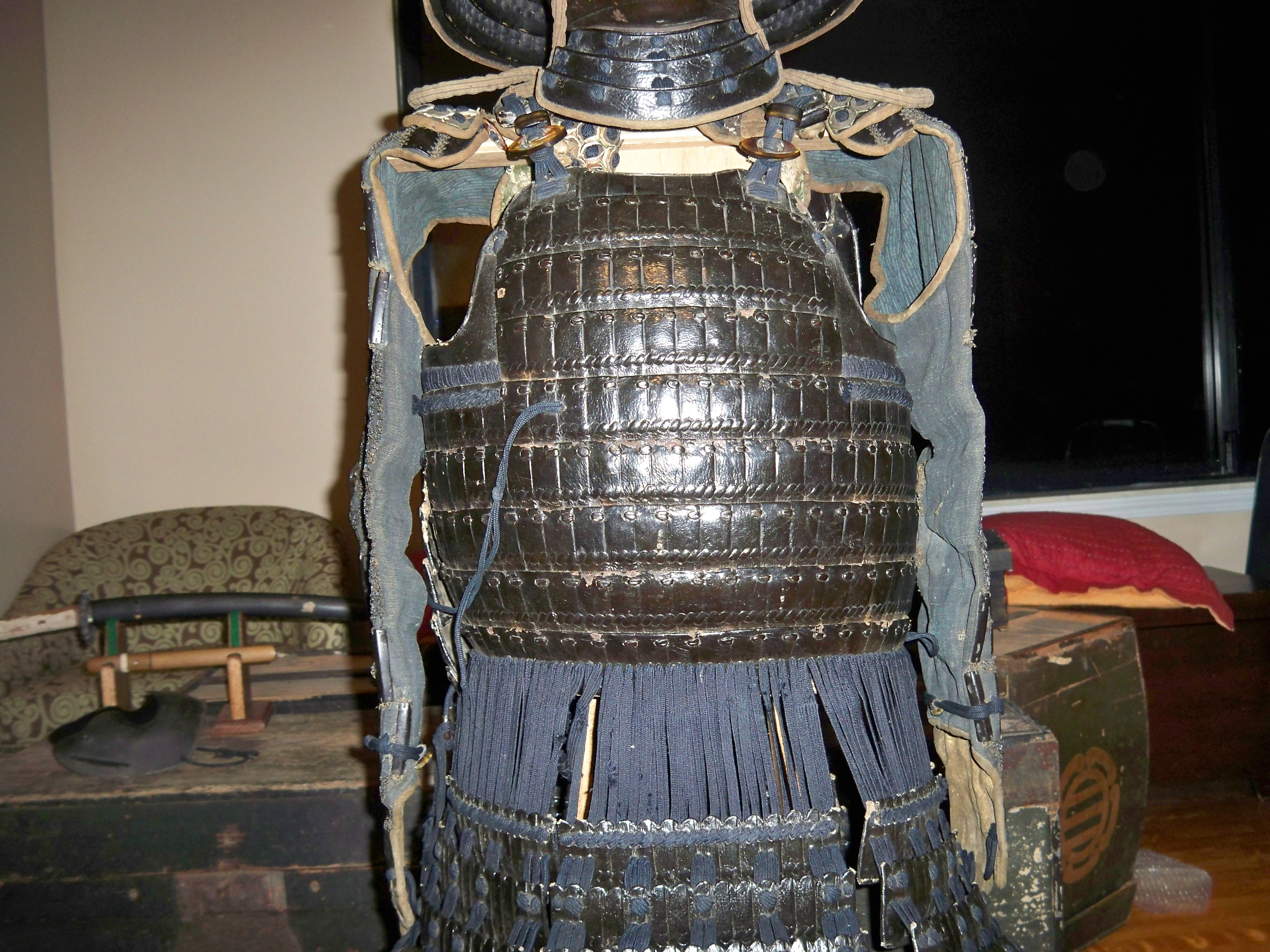
Japanese cuirass (dō) from the 17th century is made from individual large scales (hon iyozane)

Cuirasses were manufactured in Japan as early as the 4th century. Tankō, worn by foot soldiers, and keikō, worn by horsemen, were both pre-samurai types of early Japanese cuirass constructed from iron plates connected by leather thongs. During the Heian period (794–1185), Japanese armourers started to use leather as a material and lacquer for weatherproofing.

By the end of the Heian period, the Japanese cuirass had arrived at the shape recognized as part of iconic samurai armour. Scales of iron and leather, bound together by silk lace, were used to construct samurai armour. The introduction of firearms to Japan in 1543 resulted in the development of a cuirass constructed of solid iron plates. The use of the samurai cuirass lasted until the 1860s, when the national army using conventional uniforms and weapons was established. Samurai armour was last worn into battle during the Satsuma Rebellion (1877).

== See also ==
- Linothorax – Type of armor from ancient Greece
- Mirror armour – Type of cuirass (armour)
