= Jack of plate =

Type of armour consisting of small metal plates sewn between textile layers

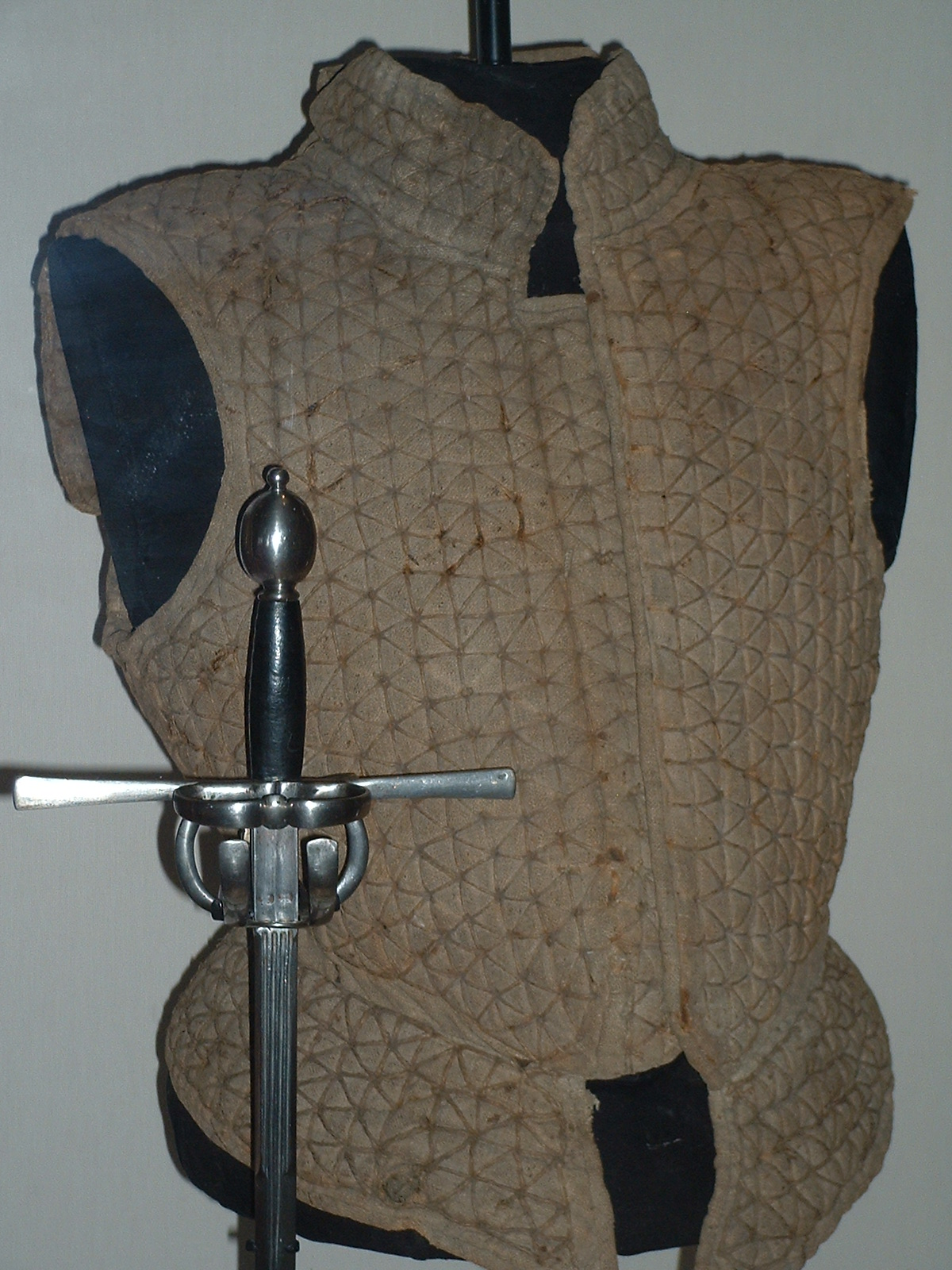
Jack of plate, English or Scottish, c1590

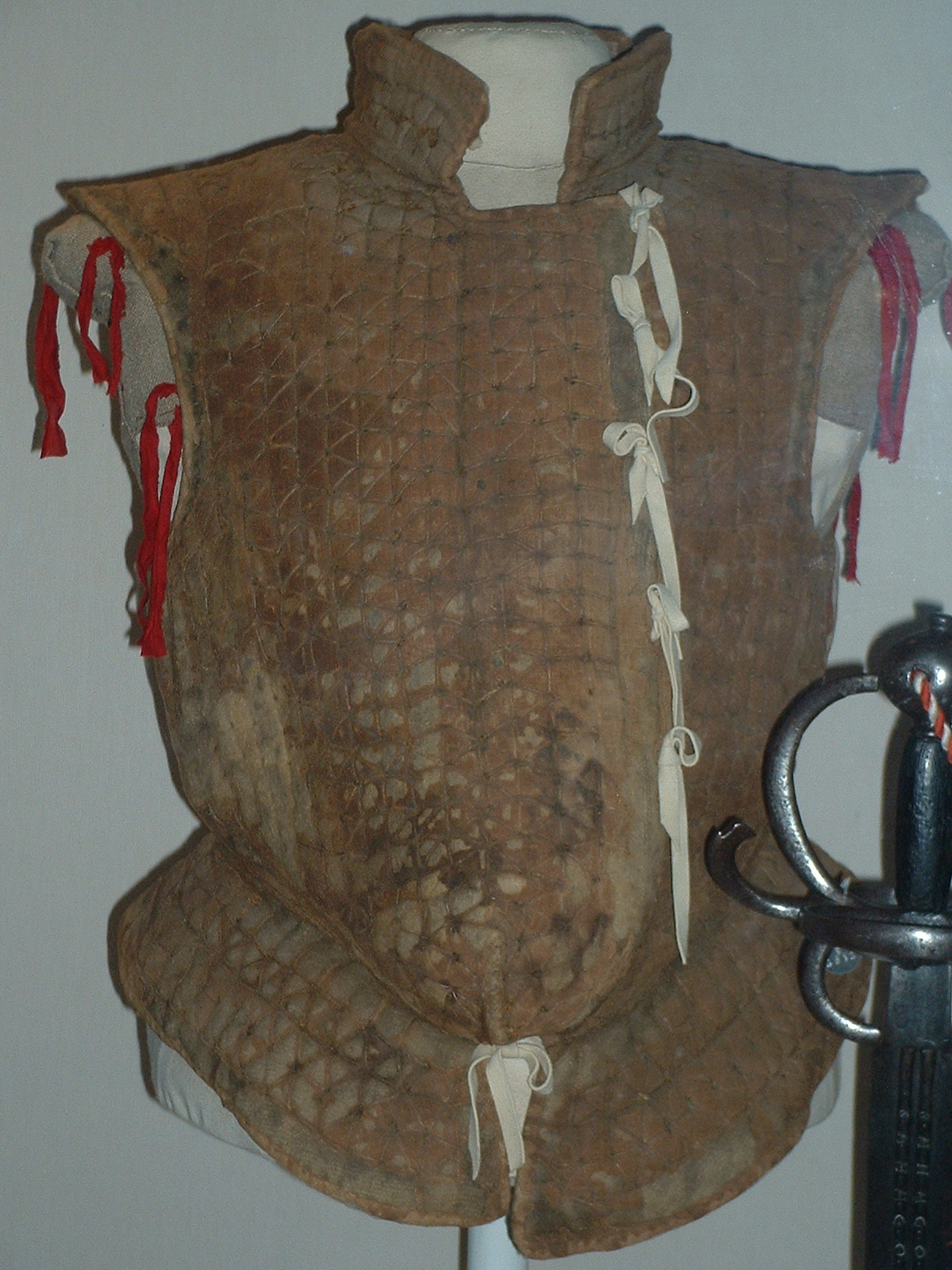
Jack of plate, English, c1580-90

A jack of plate is a type of armour made up of small iron plates sewn between layers of felt and canvas. They were commonly referred to simply as a "jack" (although this could also refer to any outer garment). This type of armour was used by common Medieval European soldiers as well as by the rebel peasants known as Jacquerie.

== Similarities with the brigandine ==
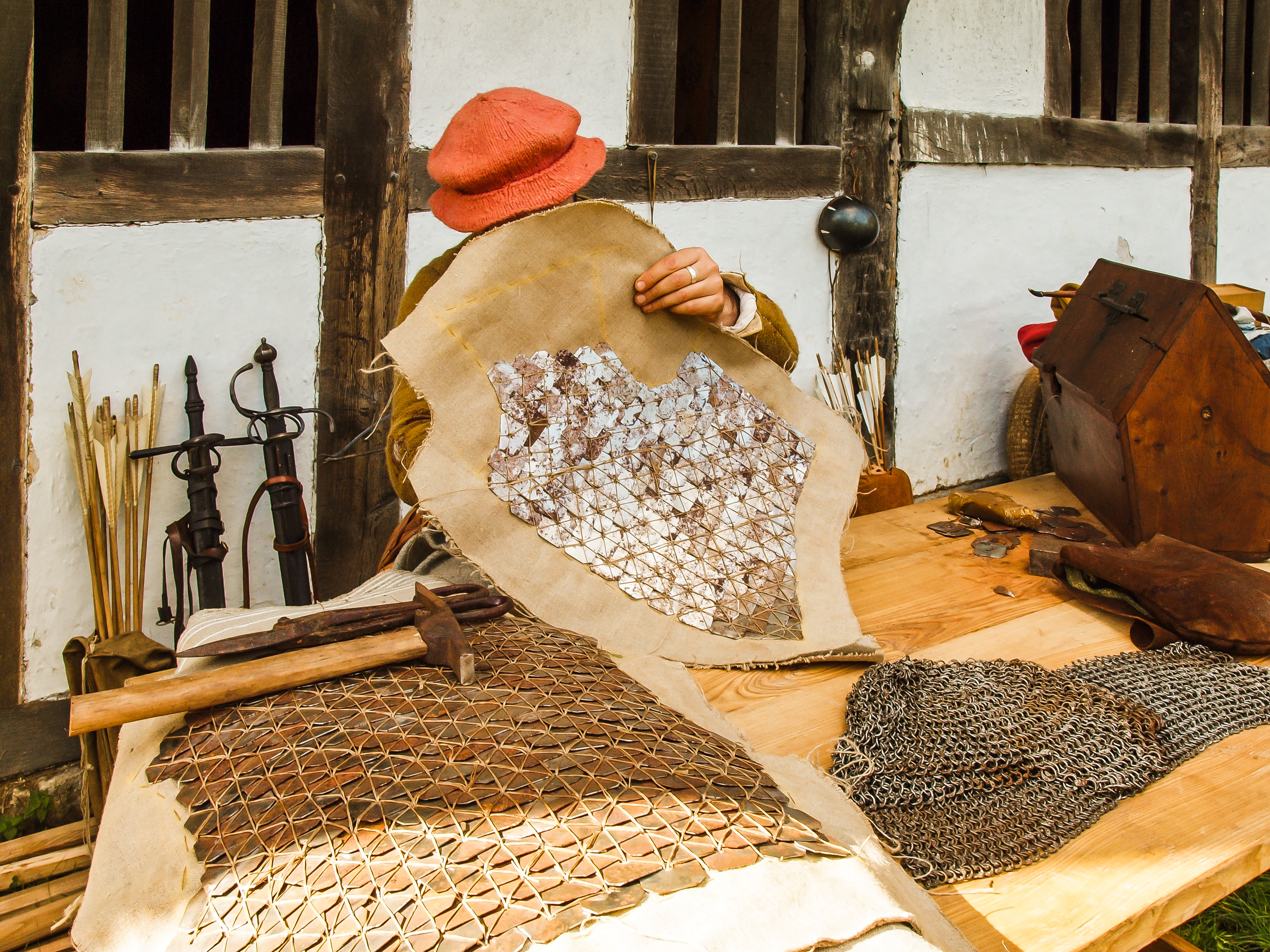
A reproduction jack being made by a member of The Tudor Group, with the internal construction clearly visible.

The jack is similar to the brigandine. The main difference is in the method of construction: a brigandine is riveted whereas a jack is sewn. Jacks of plate were created by stitching as many as 1000 small overlapping squares of iron between two canvases. The garments weighed about 17 pounds (7.7 kg). They also offered a tactical advantage: they allowed soldiers to rest the butts of weapons firmly against their shoulders, which wasn't feasible with smooth-surfaced plate armours. Unlike plate they made no attempt to be bulletproof. Jacks were often made from recycled pieces of older plate armor, including damaged brigandines and cuirasses cut into small squares.

== Use in Scotland ==
The jack was particularly favoured in Scotland. John Steel, a tailor working for James IV covered a jack with reindeer hide in 1494. James V employed John Clerk as a "jakmaker". A jack covered with velvet cost £24-14 shillings in Scottish money. After the death of James V in December 1542, Cardinal Beaton ordered the keeper of the royal wardrobe John Tennent to give the king's jack of plate to his lawyer Adam Otterburn.

Two Scottish jack makers, John and Patrick Howye, were made denizens of England in June 1544, and had been making jacks at Bamburgh in Northumberland for 14 years. Scotland and England were at war. In July 1547, James Hamilton, the Regent of Scotland, had a new jack covered with purple taffeta, then changed his mind, choosing purple velvet. His jacks were made and repaired by John Clerk. The Master of Ruthven brought a troop of soldiers dressed in "jacks and red scarves" to Yester Castle in 1548. During the rebellion against Mary, Queen of Scots known as the Chaseabout Raid, it was said in September 1565 that while her husband Henry Stuart, Lord Darnley wore a gilt corslet or breastplate, the rest of the lords "after their country fashion" wore jacks. The English diplomat Thomas Randolph said Mary wore a "secret and privy defence on her body".

== Use in Jamestown ==
Jacks remained in use as late as the 16th century and were often worn by Scottish border reivers along the Anglo-Scottish border. Although they were obsolete in Britain by the time of the English Civil War, many were taken to the New World by settlers like the Pilgrims because they provided excellent protection from the arrows used by Native Americans. One dating back to 1607 was found on Jamestown Island, the first settlement of the Colony of Virginia, in 2005.
