= Brigandine =

Armoured sleeveless jackets used by infantry in the Middle Ages

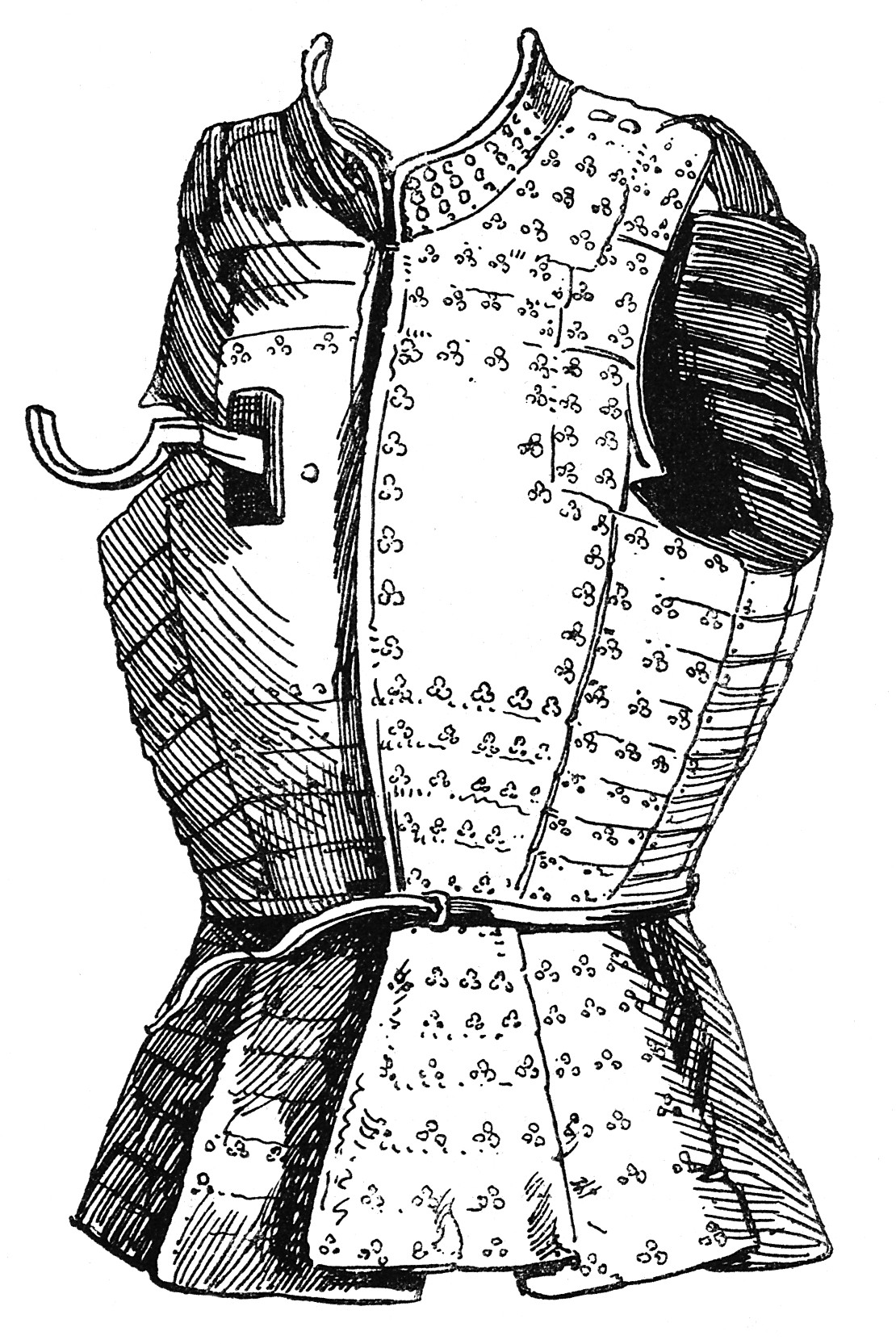
Brigandine from Handbuch der Waffenkunde (Handbook of Weaponry), Wendelin Boeheim, 1890

A brigandine (sometimes spelled brigantine), also called a brigander, is a form of body armour, in use from the late Middle Ages and up to the early modern era. It is a garment typically made of heavy cloth, canvas, or leather, featuring small oblong steel plates riveted to the fabric such that the fabric and rivets were present on the outside, sometimes with a second layer of fabric on the inside.

== Origins ==
Protective clothing and armour have been used by armies from earliest recorded history; the King James Version of the Bible (Jeremiah 46:4) translates the Hebrew סריון, siryon or שריון, śiryon "coat of mail" as "brigandine".

It is speculated that brigandine armour originated from Mongol-style lamellar armour known as khatanghu degel, which was a type of scale-lined fabric or felt coat. This type of armour was introduced to Eastern Europe, where they were adopted, possibly leading to the rise of brigandine armour in Europe during the 14th century.

Medieval brigandines were essentially a refinement of the earlier coat of plates, which began appearing during the 13th century. These were typically of simpler construction with larger metal plates. Early brigandines appeared towards the end of the 14th century, but survived beyond this transitional period between mail and plate, and came into even wider use in the 15th century, continuing into the 16th century. 15th-century brigandines are generally front-opening garments with the rivets arranged in triangular groups of three, while 16th-century brigandines generally have smaller plates with the rivets arranged in rows.

The brigandine is sometimes confused with the haubergeon, while the name is often confused with the brigantine, a swift small sea vessel.

== Construction ==
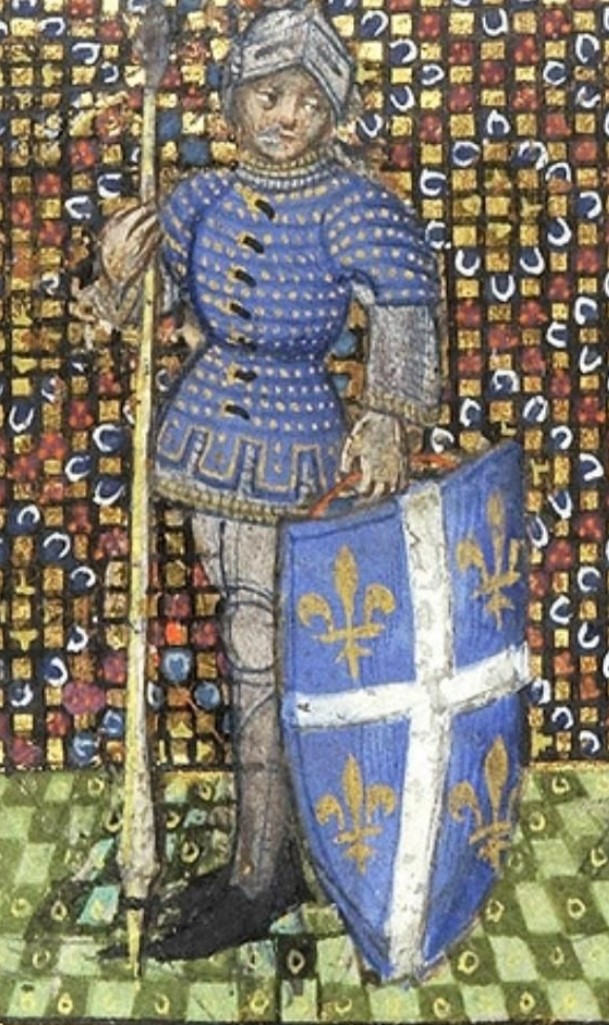
Manuscript miniature depicting a 15th century brigandine (made between 1440–1450 in Nantes or Angers)

The form of the brigandine is essentially the same as the civilian doublet but sleeveless; it features a wasp-waisted silhouette with a slightly rounded chest. However, depictions of brigandines with sleeves are known. The small armour plates were sometimes riveted between two layers of stout cloth, or just to an outer layer. Unlike armour for the torso made from large plates, the brigandine was flexible, with a degree of movement between each of the overlapping plates. Many brigandines appear to have had larger, somewhat L-shaped plates over the central chest area. The rivets attaching the plates to the fabric were often decorated, being gilt, or of latten, and sometimes embossed with a design. The rivets were also often grouped to produce a repeating decorative pattern. In more expensive brigandines the outer layer of cloth was usually of silk. The contrast between a richly dyed silk cloth and gilded rivet heads must have been impressive and, unsurprisingly, such armour was popular with high-status individuals.

Modern flak jackets and ballistic vests are based on the same principle.

== Use ==
The brigandine was in common usage in Europe from the mid-13th century until the late 16th century. Coats of plates and brigandines (of which the latter was essentially a variant of the former) trended towards more, smaller plates throughout the 13th century and most of the 14th, but by the later stages of the 14th this trend reversed. Plates became larger in size but fewer in number (even fewer than in the 13th), until they could be regarded as a rudimentary breastplate with some smaller plates attached.

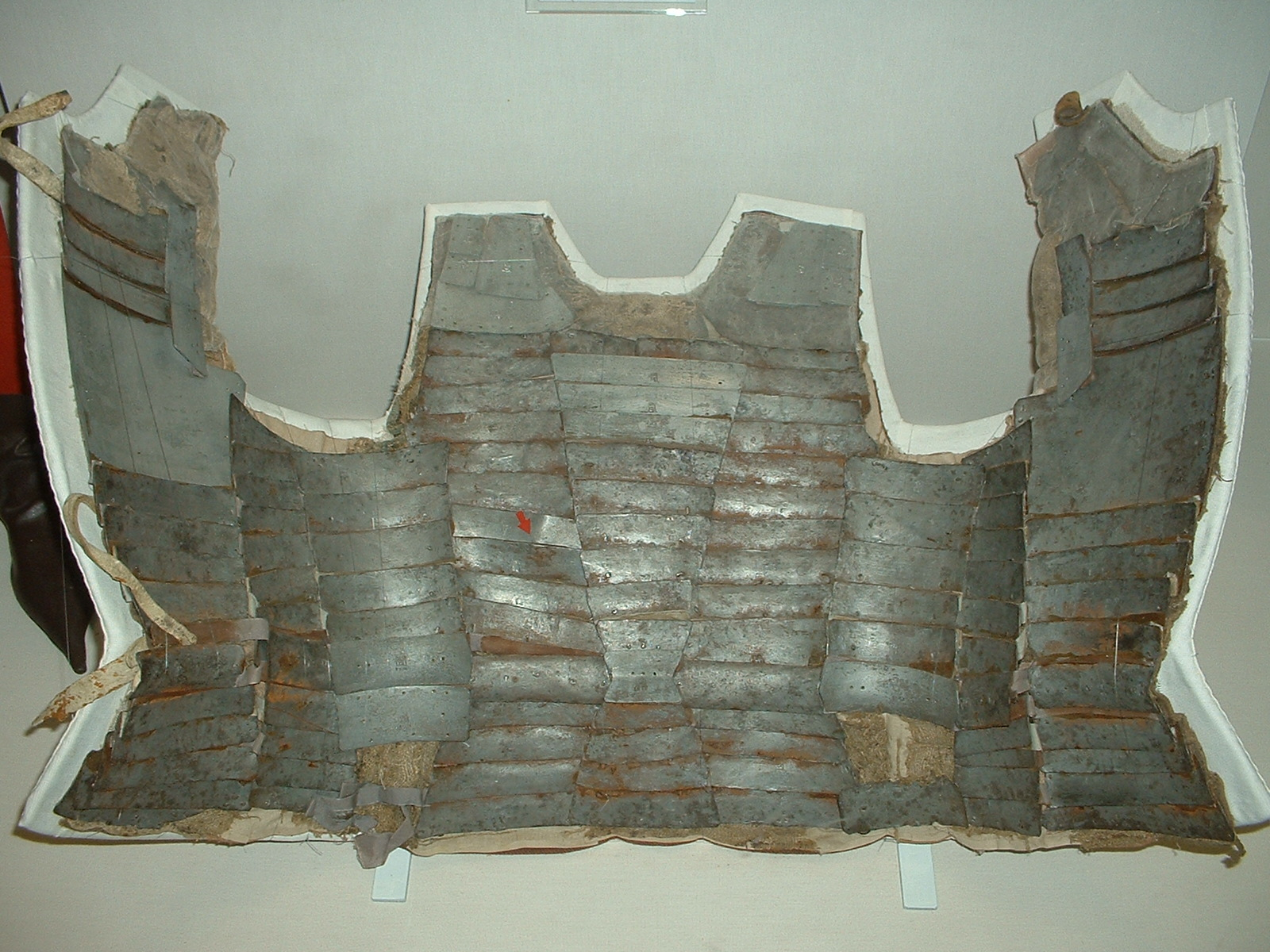
Inside view of an Italian brigandine (c. 1470).

A brigandine was commonly worn over a gambeson and mail shirt and it was not long before this form of protection was commonly used by soldiers ranging in rank from archers to knights. It was most commonly used by men-at-arms. These wore brigandines, along with plate armour arm and leg protection, as well as a helmet. Even with the gambeson and the mail shirt, a wearer was not as well-protected as when wearing a complete harness of plate armour, but the brigandine gave the soldier a greater degree of mobility and flexibility and its design was also simple enough that a soldier or knight could repair his own armour or have it repaired without needing the services of an armourer. Brigandines, in the lower end of quality, were generally cheaper than a breastplate and/or plackart: In France during the 15th century, archers had to at least bring a brigandine to battle while a man at arms had to at least bring a breastplate. But more expensive versions were made for the higher nobility.

A common myth is that brigandines were so-named because they were a popular choice of protection for bandits and outlaws. This is untrue: originally, the term "brigand" referred to a foot soldier, and a brigandine was simply a type of armour worn by a foot soldier. It had nothing to do with its alleged ability to be concealed by bandits. In fact, brigandines were highly fashionable and were ostentatiously displayed by wealthy aristocrats both in European and in Asian courts.

== Similar types ==
=== European jack of plate ===
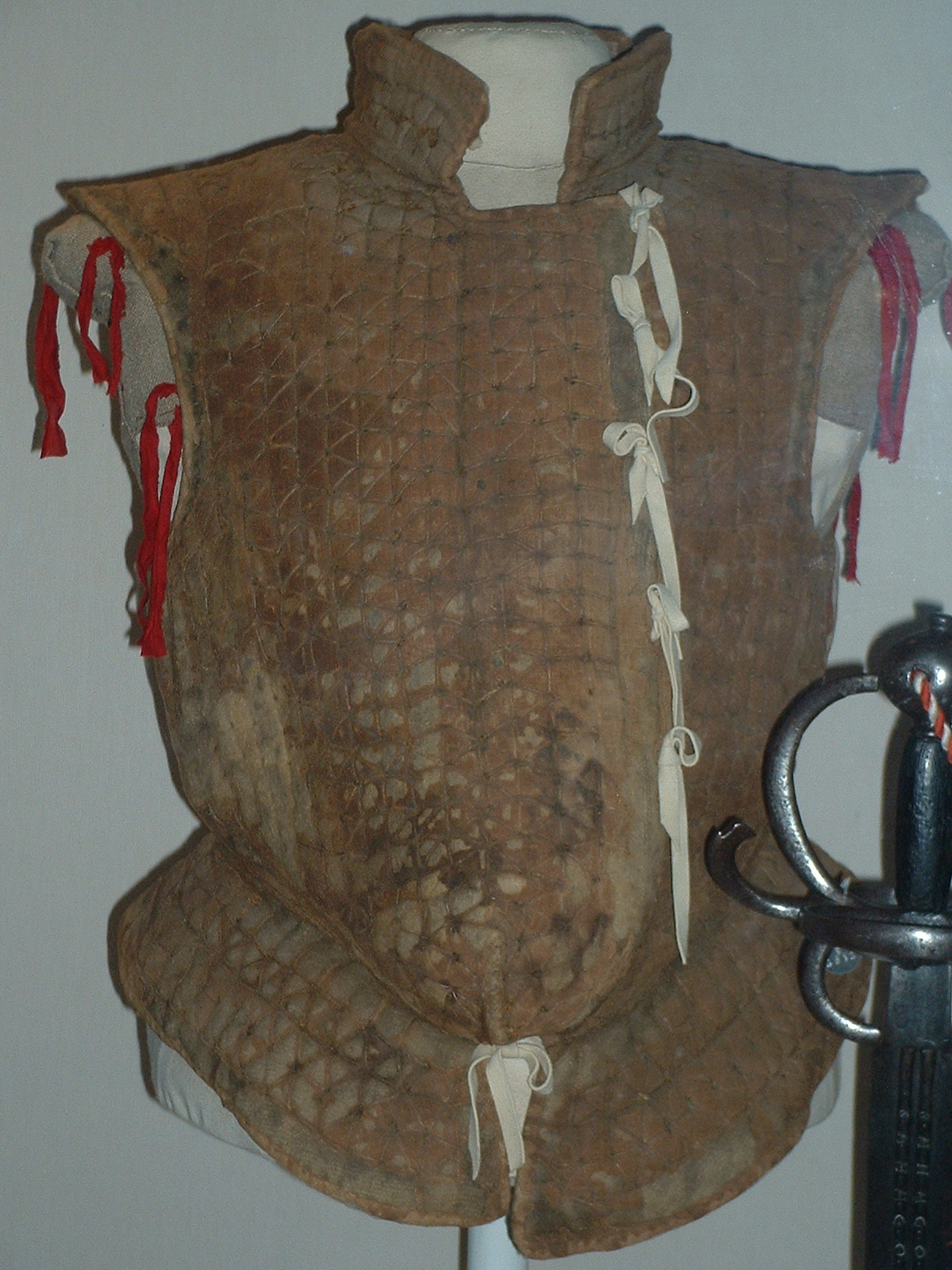
Jack of plate, English, c. 1580–1590

A similar type of armour was the jack of plate, commonly referred to simply as a "jack" (although this could also refer to any outer garment). This type of armour was used by common medieval European soldiers and the rebel peasants known as Jacquerie.

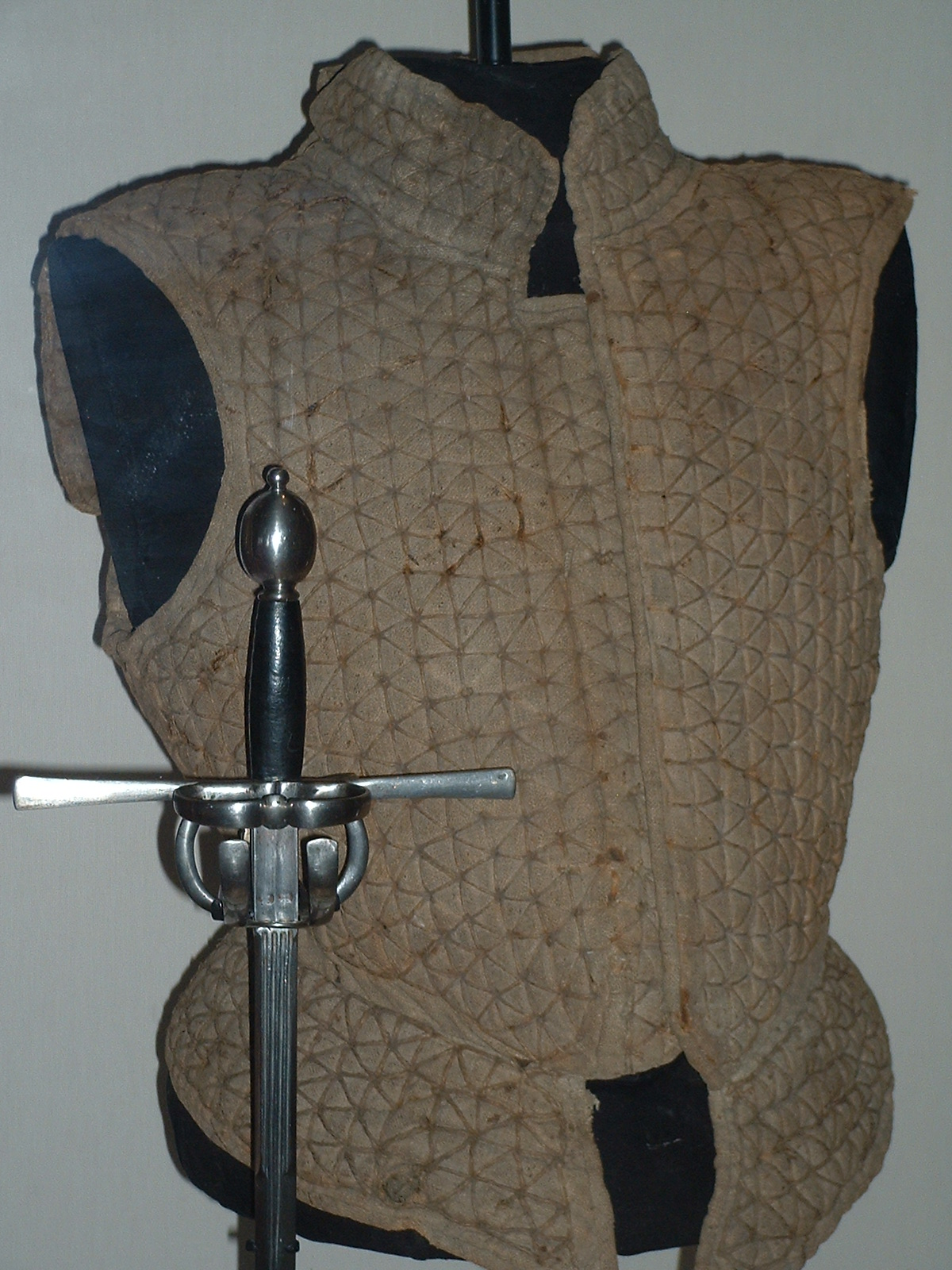
Jack of plate, English or Scottish, c. 1590

Like the brigandine, the jack was made of small iron plates between layers of felt and canvas. The main difference is in the method of construction: a brigandine uses rivets to secure the plates, whereas the plates in a jack are sewn in place. Jacks were often made from recycled pieces of older plate armour, including damaged brigandines and cuirasses cut into small squares.

Jacks remained in use as late as the 16th century and were often worn by Border reivers. Although they were obsolete by the time of the English Civil War, many were taken to the New World by English settlers as they provided excellent protection from Native American arrows. One dating back to 1607 was found at Jamestown in 2008.

=== Indian "coat of ten thousand nails" ===
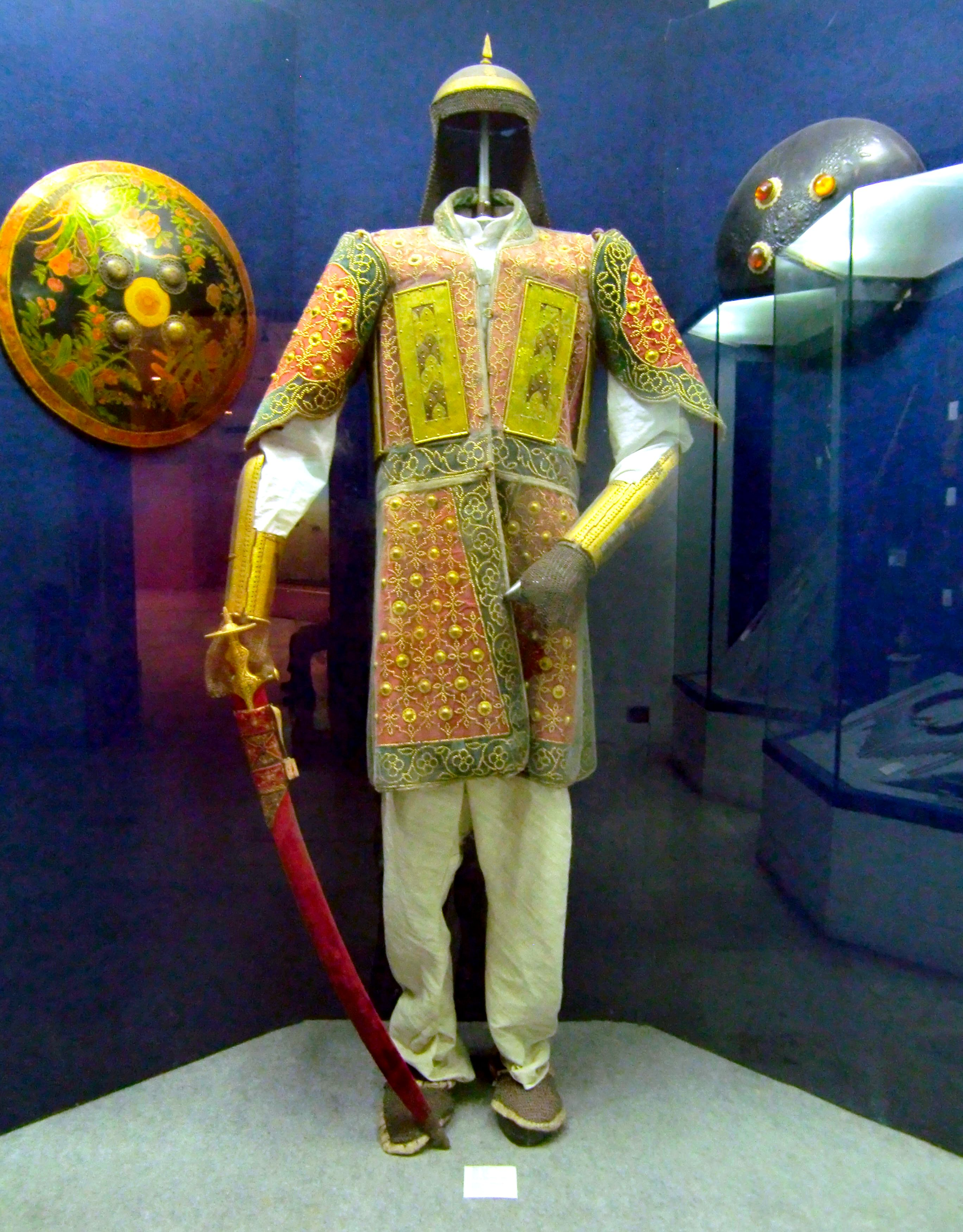
Indian brigandine reinforced by mirror plates

The medieval Indian equivalent of the brigandine was the chihal'ta hazar masha, or "coat of ten thousand nails", which was a padded leather jacket covered in velvet and containing steel plates which was used until the early 19th century. The skirt was split to the waist, allowing the soldier to ride a horse. Matching vambraces and boots containing metal plates were also used. These were often elaborately decorated with gold lace, silk and satin and are highly prized by European collectors.

Tipu Sultan wore armour of this type during his wars against the East India Company. The Turks used similar armour during the Russo-Turkish Wars.

Two complete suits of armour are preserved in the Hermitage Museum, Saint Petersburg.

=== Chinese bumianjia ===
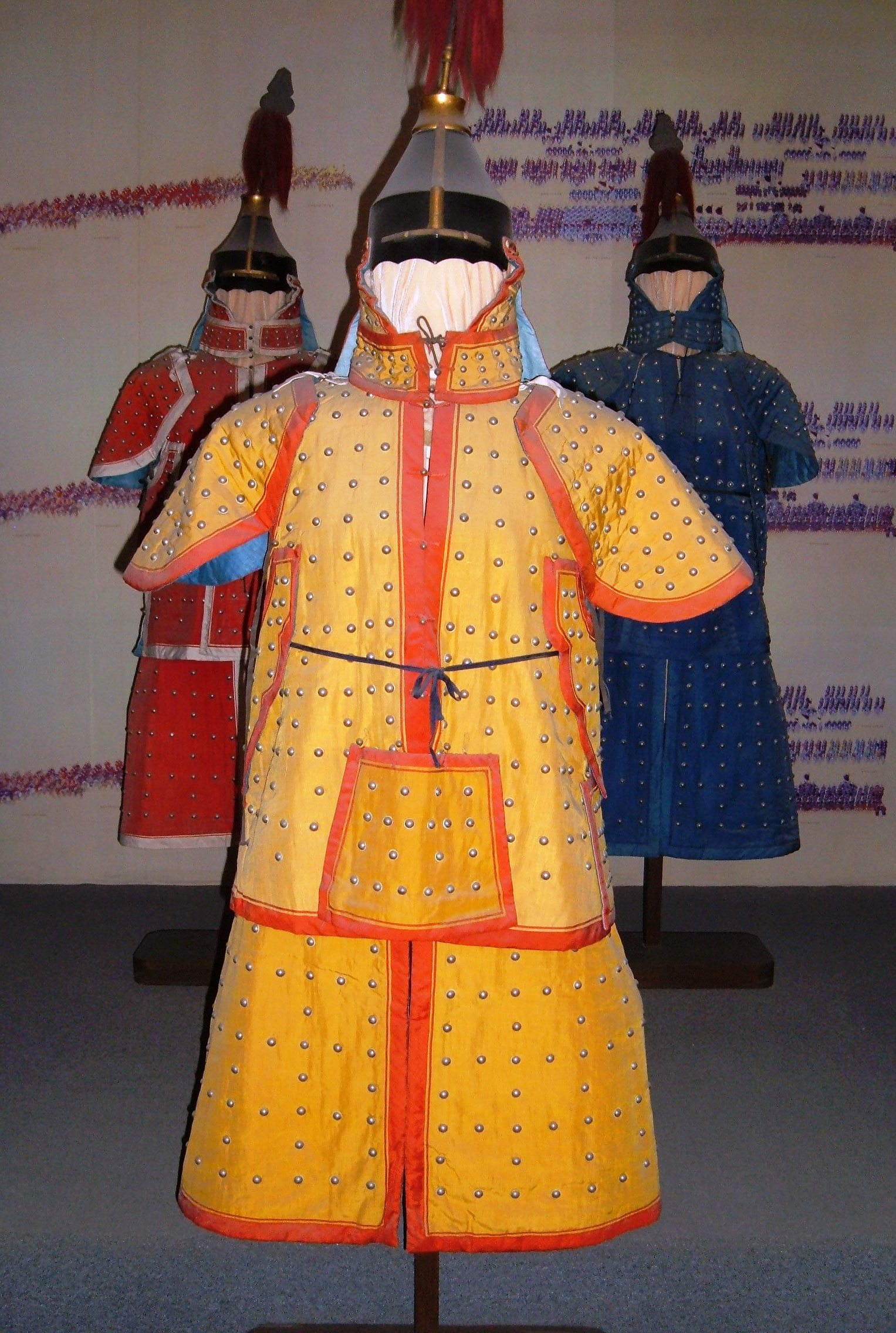
Qing military uniform, made to look like earlier Dingjia armour

A type of armour very similar in design to brigandine, known as cloth surface armor bumianjia (Chinese:布面甲; Pinyin: Bù miàn jiǎ), or nail (fastener, not finger or toe nail) armor dingjia (Chinese: 釘甲; Pinyin: Dīng jiǎ), was used in medieval China.

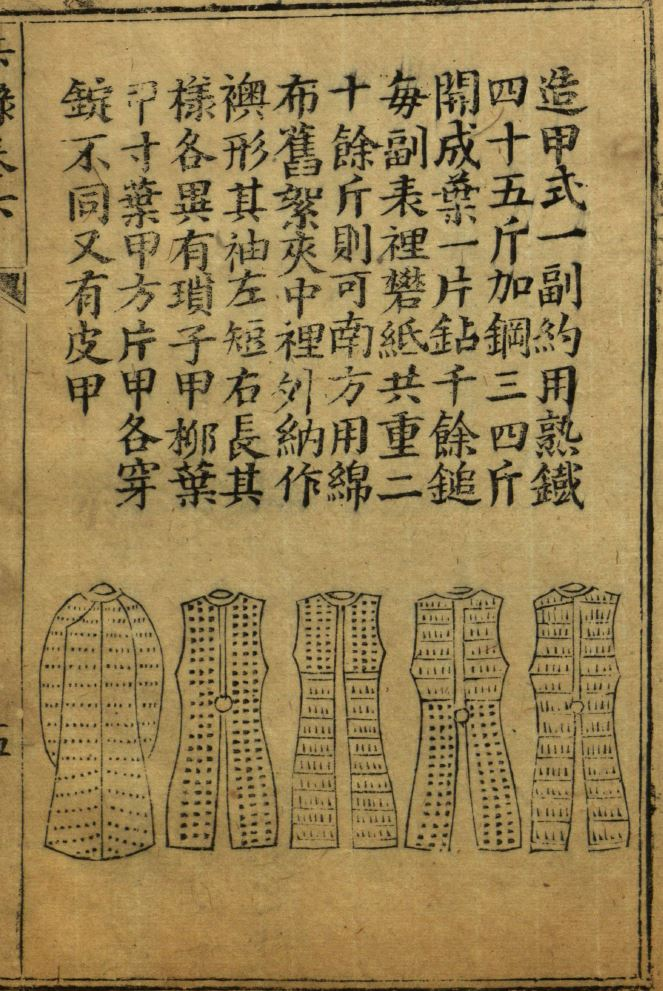
Depiction of lamellar armour on the right and brigandine armour on the left, Ming dynasty – 1368 to 1644

It consisted of rectangular metal plates riveted between the fabric layers with the rivet heads visible on the outside. Sometimes optionally its chest was reinforced by a round mirror plate Chinese: 护心镜, hùxīnjìng, meaning "protect-heart mirror".

Russian orientalist and weapon expert Mikhail Gorelik states that it was invented in the 8th century as parade armour for the Emperor's guards by reinforcing a thick cloth robe with overlapping iron plates, but did not come into wide use until the 13th century, when it became widespread in the Mongol Empire under the name of hatangu degel ("robe which is as strong as iron"). He also argues that Eastern European kuyaks and, supposedly, Western European brigandines originate from this armour.

Bumianjia were still used in China as late as the Ming and Qing periods. It was favoured by common soldiers and officers alike for its rich, expensive look and protection. Later Qing examples, however, often lacked iron plates and were merely a military uniform.

=== Russian kuyak ===
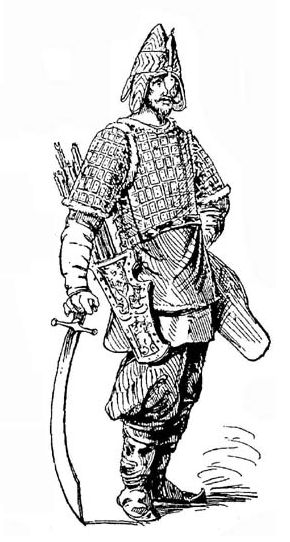
Depiction of a late 15th-century Russian warrior in kuyak from Wendelin Boeheim's Handbuch der Waffenkunde

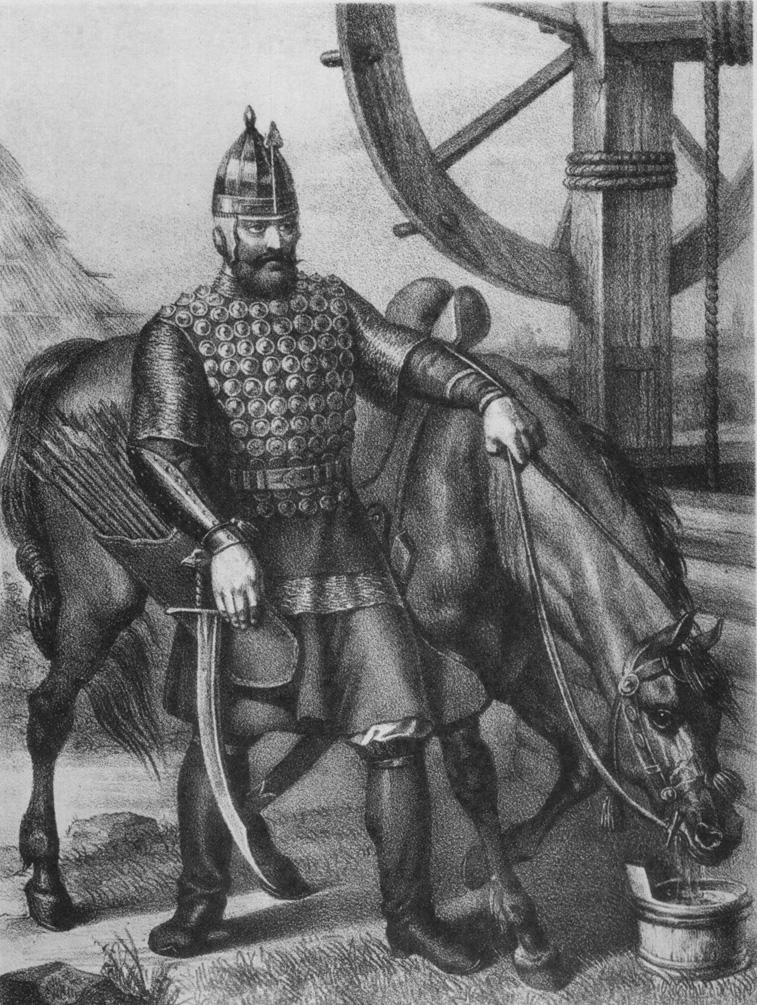
19th-century artist's interpretation (likely erroneous) of the kuyak armour

In Muscovy, there was a type of armour known as the kuyak, believed to have Mongolian origins, and analogous to Central Asian, Indian and Chinese brigandines. The word "kuyak" is itself a derivative from the Mongol huyag, which means "armour" (of any type). No known intact examples of this type of armour survives, but historical depictions, textual descriptions and photos remain.

The descriptions, while not offering any in-depth details of the kuyak's construction, suggest a textile body armour reinforced with iron plates, usually not specifying directly their placement, only mentioning the "nails" (rivets) which attached the plates to the cloth. This was often worn with faulds, pauldrons and arm protection (rerebraces and vambraces), sometimes covered in expensive textiles like sateen, velvet or damask and decorated with fur.

Some kuyaks had large "mirror" plates or "shields" attached to the outside. Some descriptions also mention cotton wool padding.

There were also brigandine helmets called "kuyak hats" that used the same principle of construction as the kuyak body armour.

=== Serbian toke ===
Clothes with sewn in pieces of metal, used by the Serbian revolutionaries in the uprising against the Ottoman rule (1804–1813, 1814, 1815–1817)

Toke were also worn decoratively, in which case were made of silver and gold.

One of the notable leaders of the uprising, Uzun Mirko Apostolović, is shown wearing the toke in his famous portrait by Uroš Knežević

=== Japanese kikko ===
Kikko is the Japanese form of brigandine. Kikko are hexagonal plates made from iron or hardened leather and sewn to cloth. These plates were either hidden by a layer of cloth or left exposed. Kikko were used only relatively recently, during the 16th century.

Kikko comes in many forms including coats, vests, gloves, arm and thigh protectors, and helmet neck guards. Kikko armour was worn as a standalone defense or under other types of armour as additional protection.

=== Korean dujeong-gap ===
The Korean dujeong-gap is the Korean equivalent of brigandine worn by the Joseon Army and Navy. In the late Joseon dynasty, the dujeong-gap became the primary form of Korean metallic armor and often reached below the knees when worn. The helmet assumes a conical shape and has three brigandine neck defenses attached to the sides and back of the helmet. The exterior fabric of the dujeong-gap varied; however, examples from the 18th century onwards show the usage of red cotton flannel, red velvet, and yellow cotton (often used for less decorated armors worn by lower-ranking officers and soldiers). The plates used within the dujeong-gap also varied and could be made of either iron, copper, or leather. Dujeong-gap with metal plates were worn by the Pengbaesu, and the Gabsa, while the dujeong-gap with leather plates were part of a set of leather armor worn by peasants called pigabju.

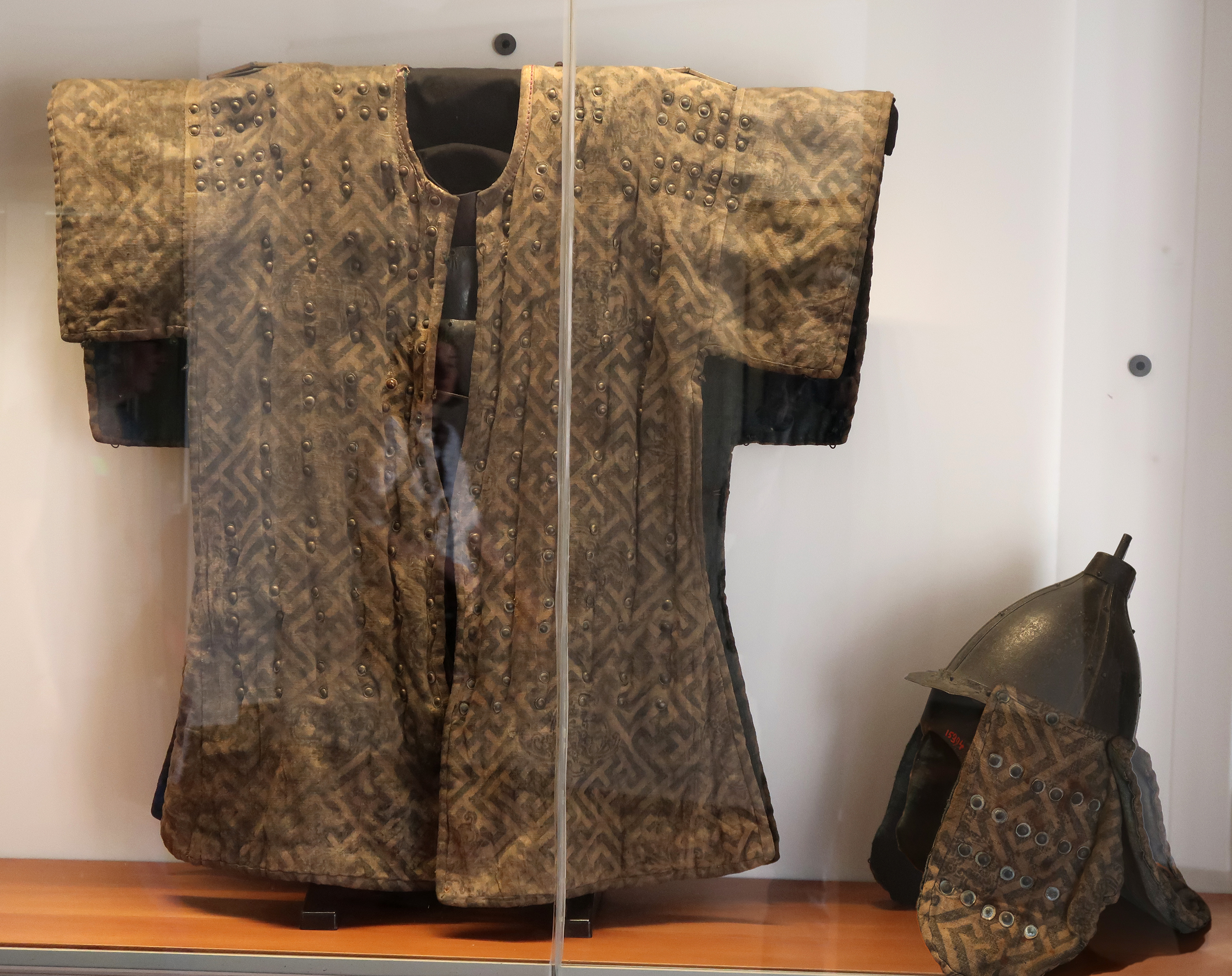
Armor and helmet. Joseon period, 19th century. Musée Guimet.

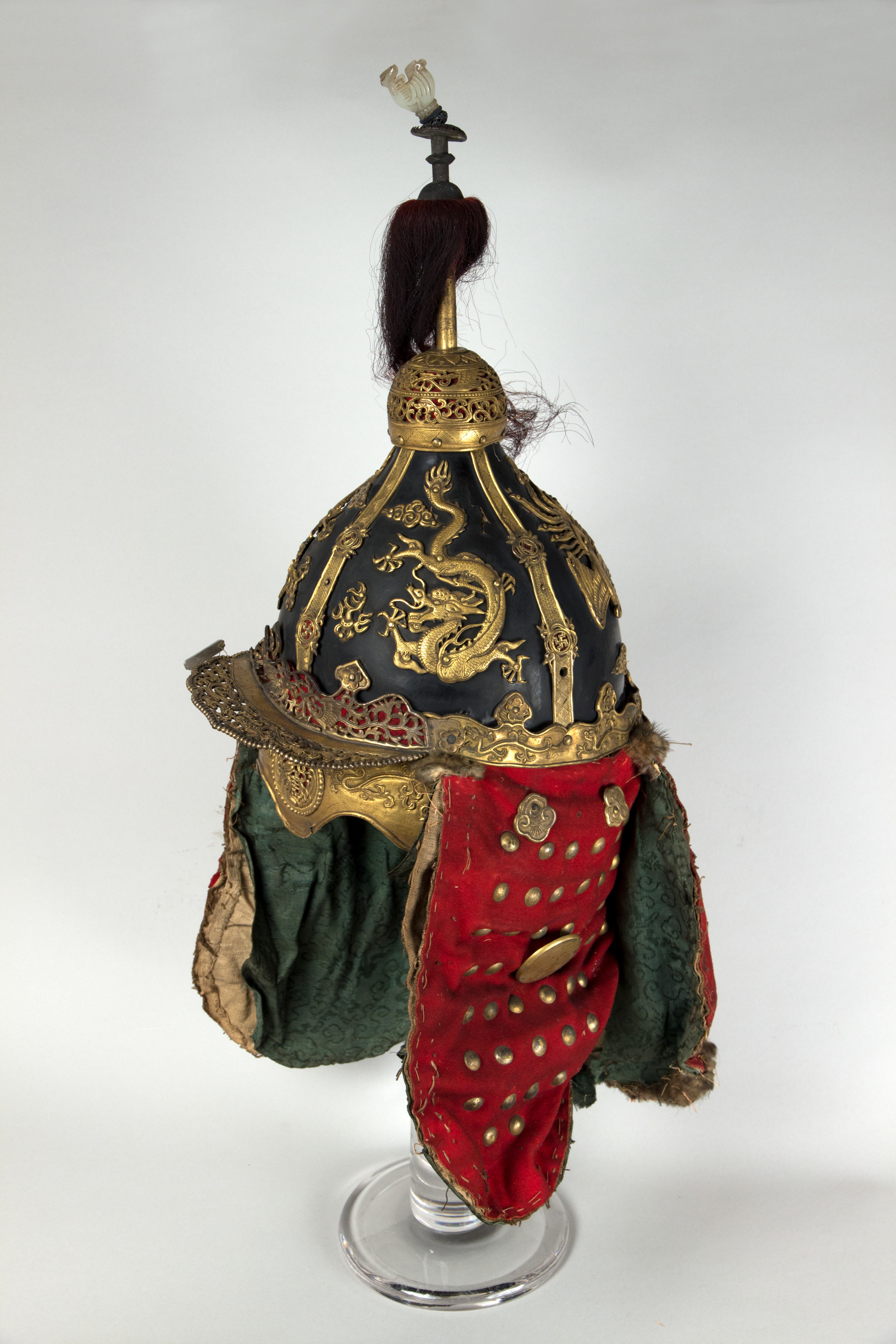
Joseon conical helmet with tassel.

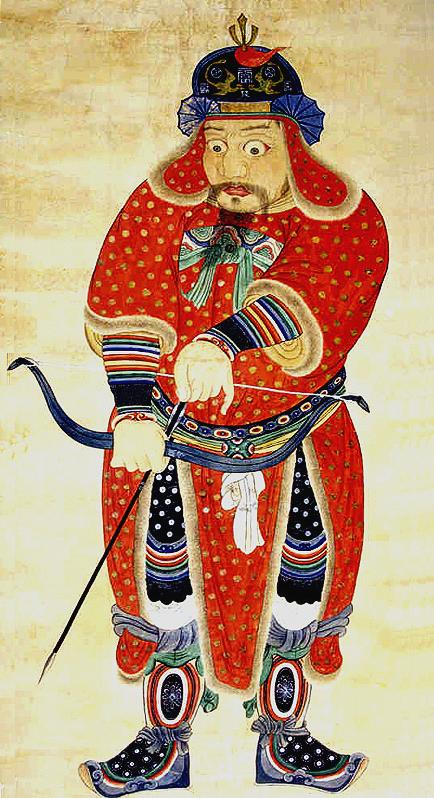
Yun Kwan, a General during the Goryeo dynasty, depicted as wearing a Dujeong-gap. Likely anachronistic.

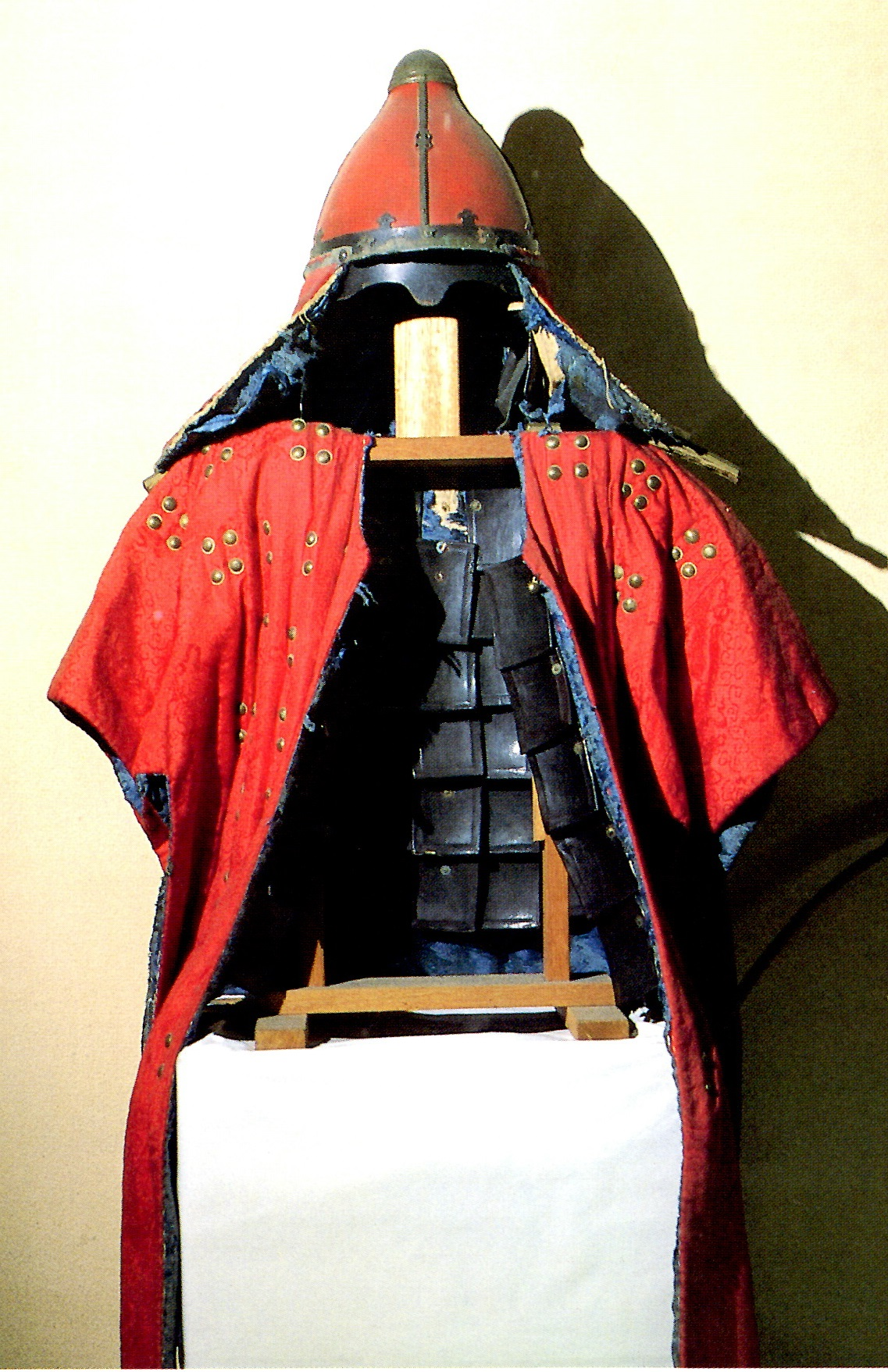
Joseon dynasty Dujeong-gap showing internal plate layout,

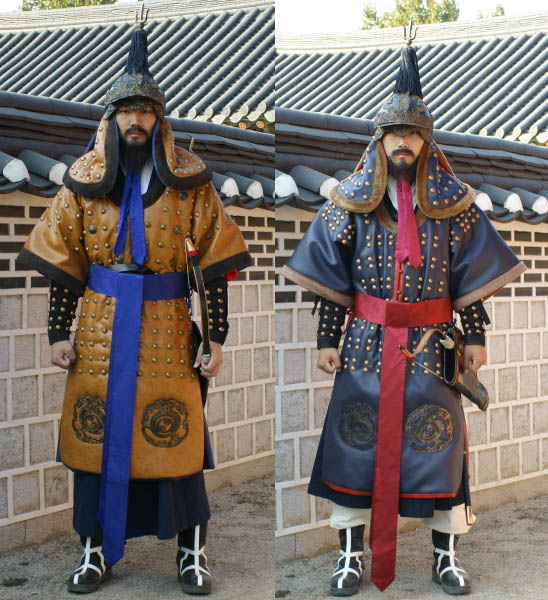
Modern reenactors wearing a complete Dujeong-gap set. While conventionally shown as red, the fabric is made of various colors.

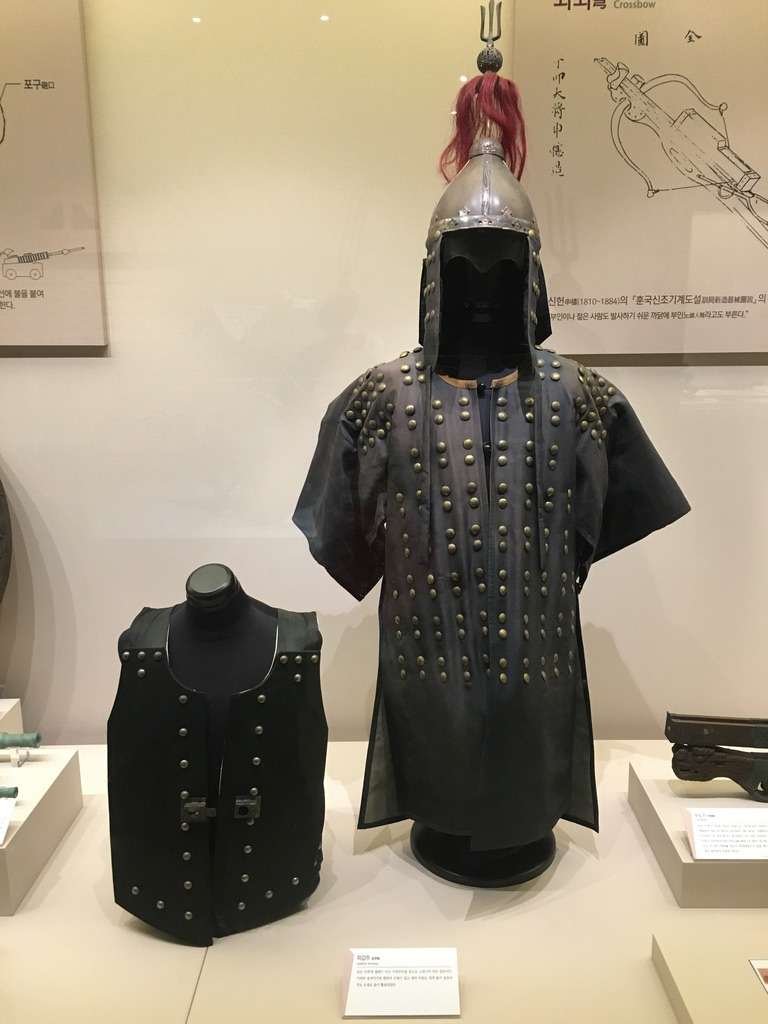
leather plated Dujeong-gap (right) armor, a variant of a pigabju.

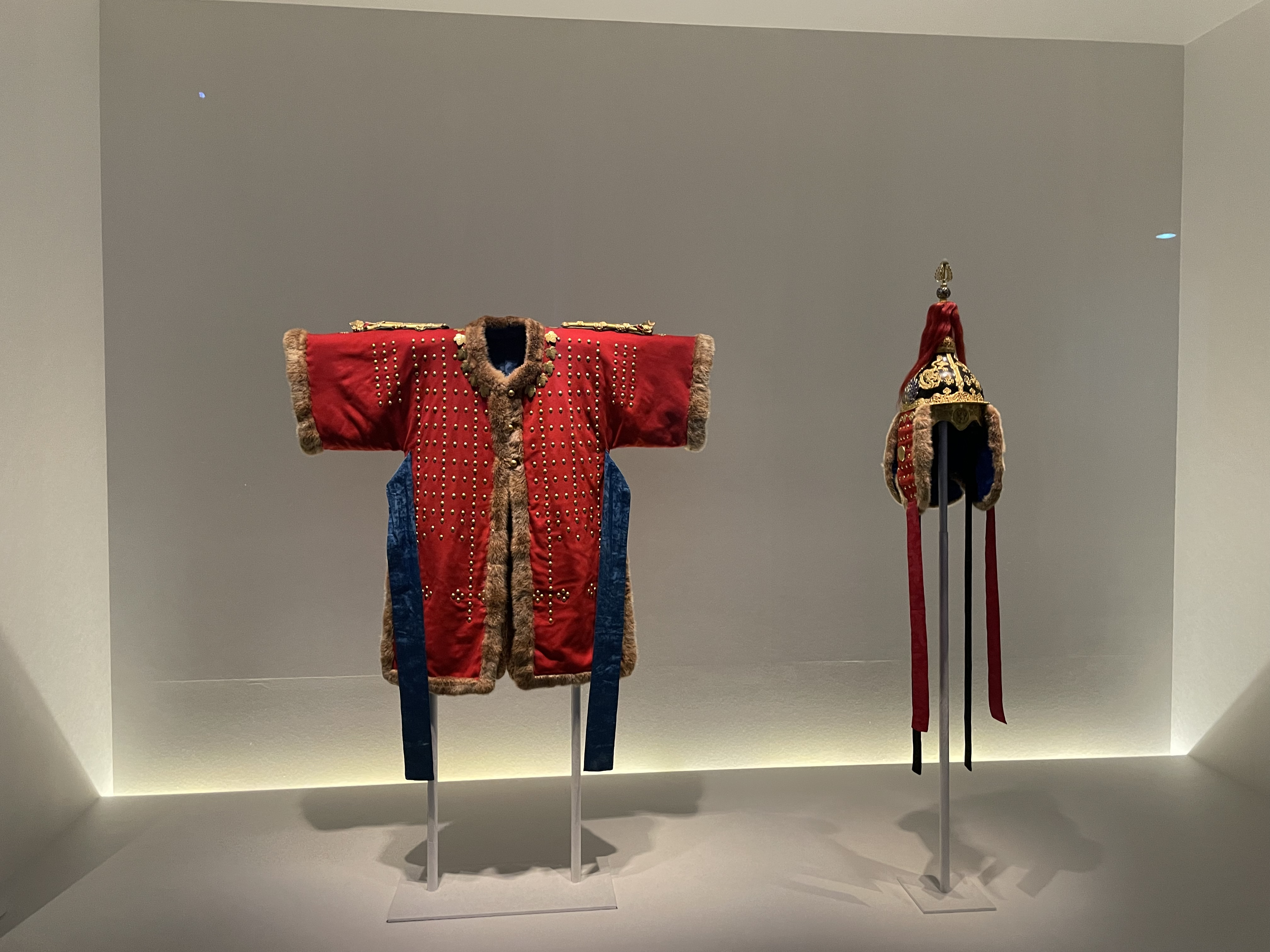
Joseon armor sent to Austria-Hungary

== See also ==
- Coat of plates
- Jack of plate
- Plated mail
- Mirror armour
- Components of medieval armour
