= Mongolian armour =

Protective wear used by Mongol warriors

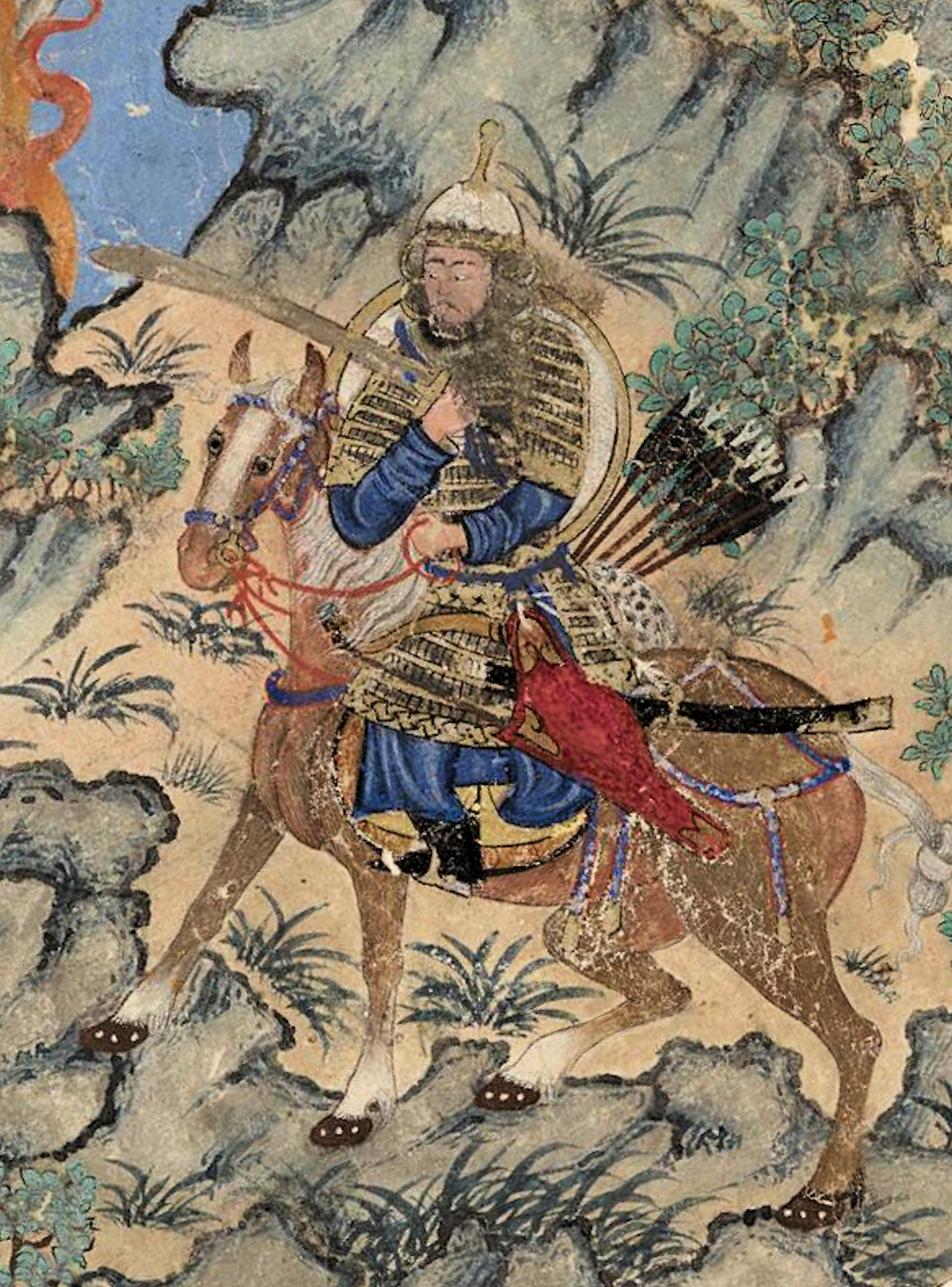
An armoured horseman depicted in the Diez Albums, from Ilkhanid, Jalayirid, and Timurid workshops

Mongolian armour has a long history. Mongol armour drew its influence from Chinese, Middle Eastern, and Central Asian styles. Most Mongolian armour was scale and lamellar made of hardened leather and iron, laced together onto a fabric backing, sometimes silk. Mail armour was also sometimes used, but was rare, probably due to its weight and difficulty to repair. Mongol archers demanded the armour be light enough so that when riding, it didn't interfere with their mobility.

It is also possible that the Mongol armour lacked mail and was generally lighter than its counterparts to the East and West because the nomadic habits of the Mongols were not conducive to the labour-intensive practices and permanent facilities necessary for making mail or large plates. Sometimes arm protection was removed so riders could draw their bow more easily.

Helmets were mostly iron, but leather and other materials were also used. Lamellar armour was also used by the countries that were affected by the invasion of the Mongols worldwide, including the Mongol conquest of China and the Mongol invasion of Persia and Mesopotamia and the Levant. This is especially shown by Timur, a Turco-Mongol warlord of the 15th century who used lamellar armour consistently with his cavalry and garbed himself and his men in Mongol armour.

Genghis Khan was once said to have issued all his horsemen with silk vests, as an arrow hitting silk does not break the silk but ends up embedding the arrow in the flesh wrapped in silk, allowing the arrow to be removed by gently teasing the silk open. This is opposed to removing barbed arrows by cutting them out or pushing them through and out the other side. These silk vests functioned much like the padded armour used by European and Byzantine soldiers of the same era such as the gambeson.

== Gallery ==
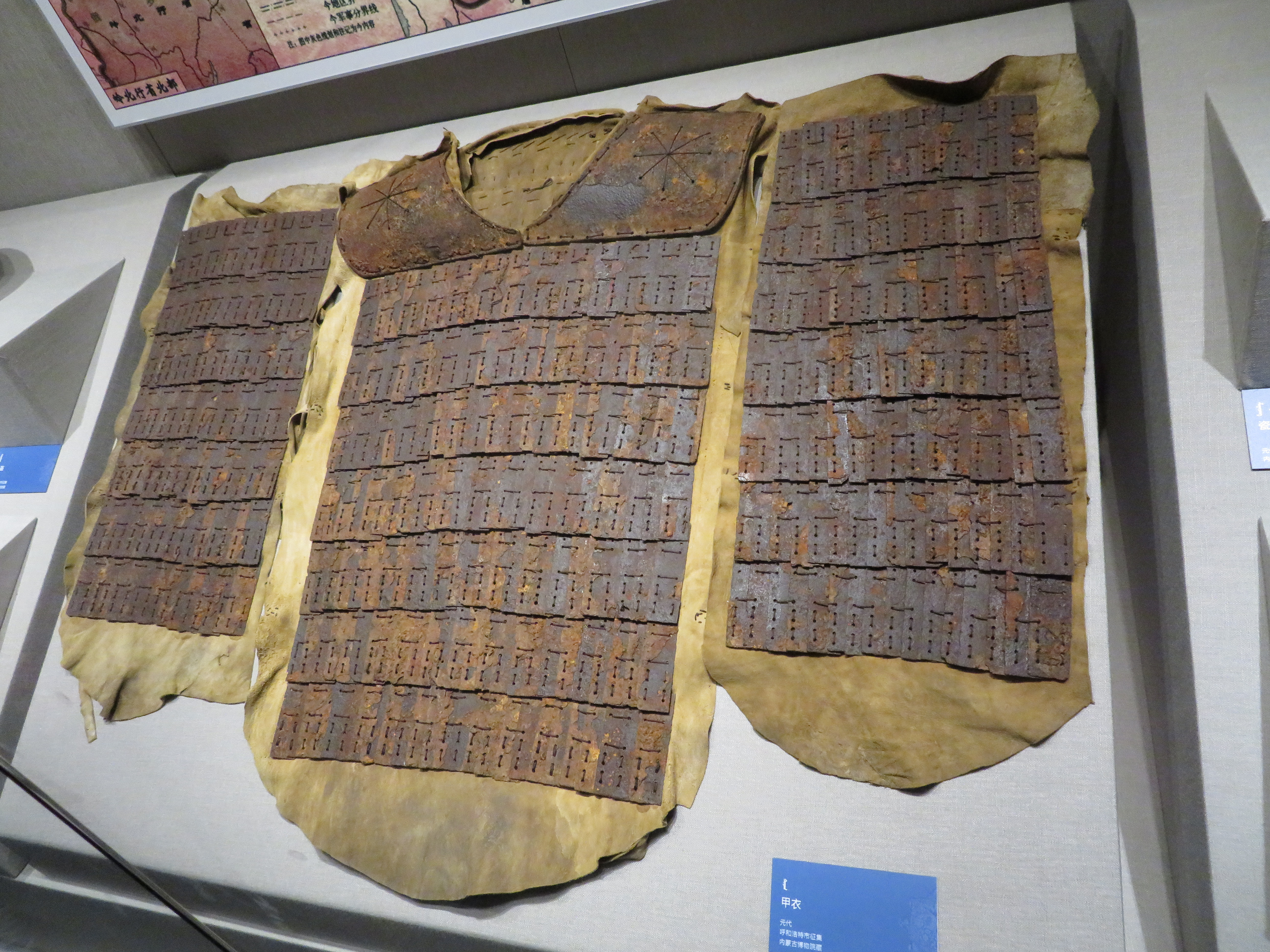
Yuan lamellar armour

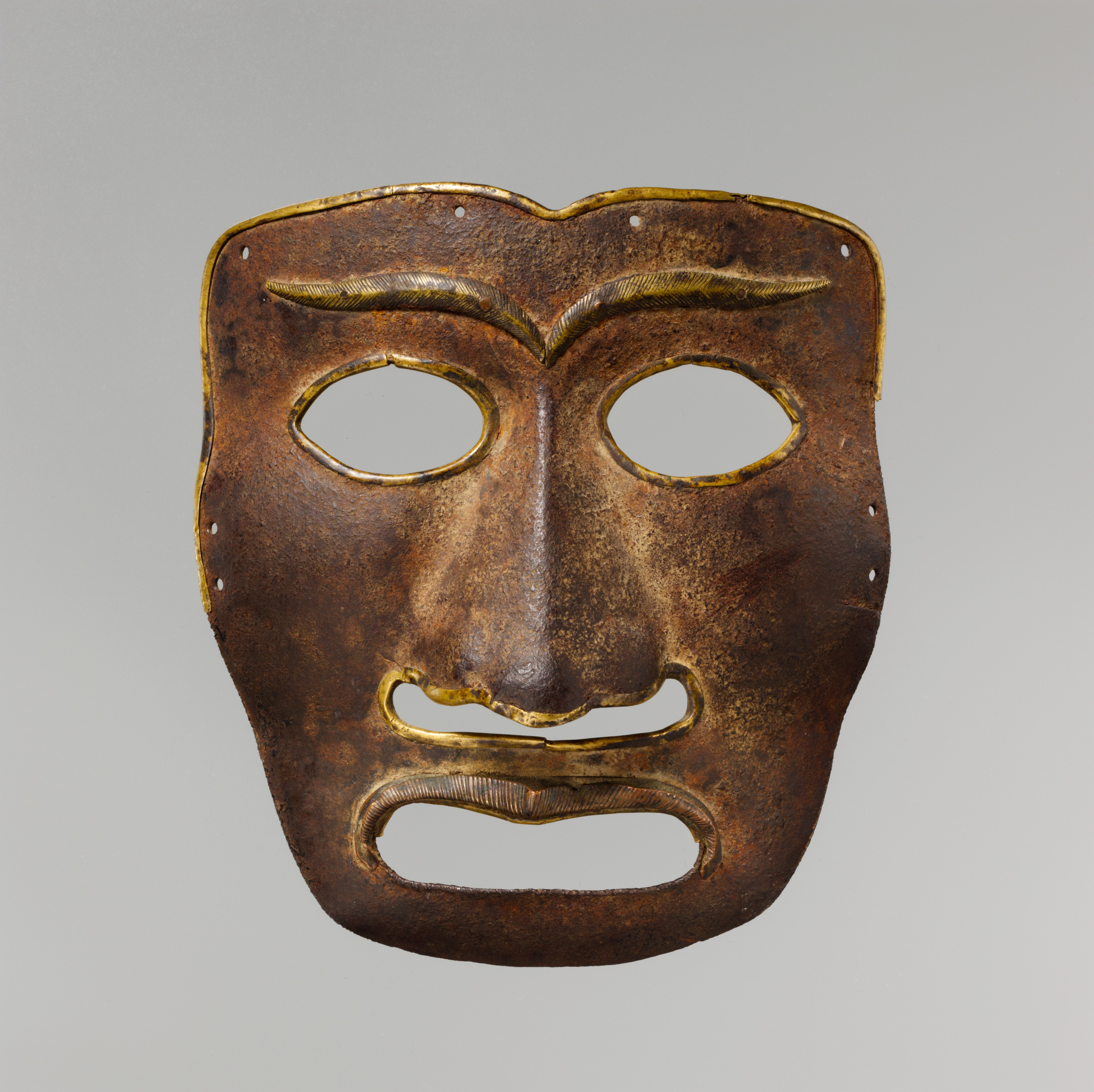
Mongol war mask, 12-14th century. One of the only two Mongolian or Tibetan armour masks.

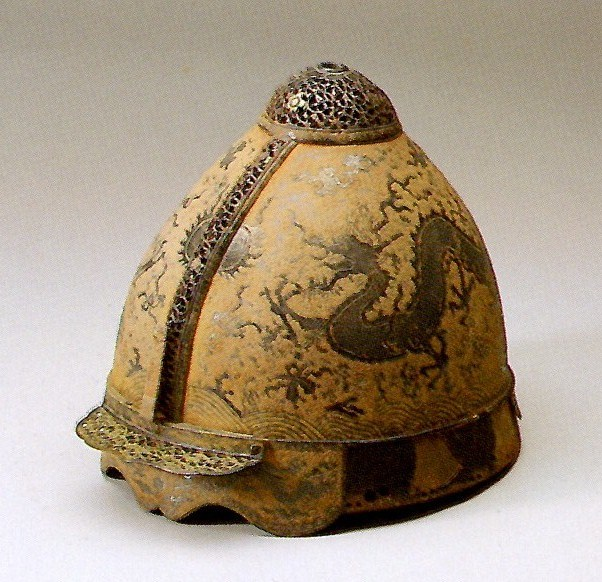
Yuan helmet

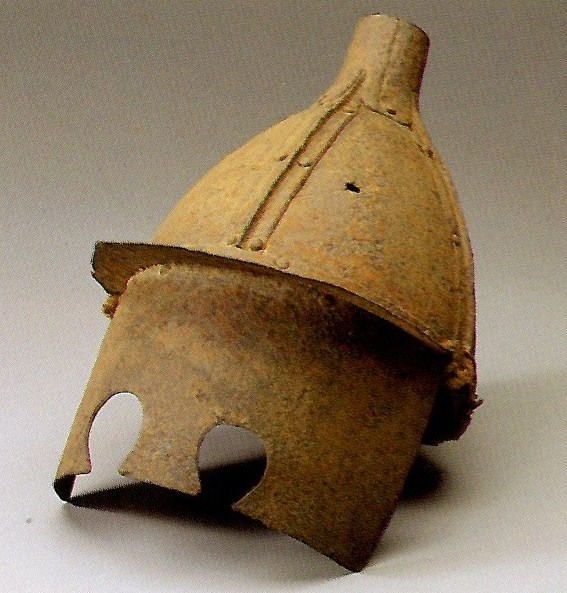
Yuan helmet

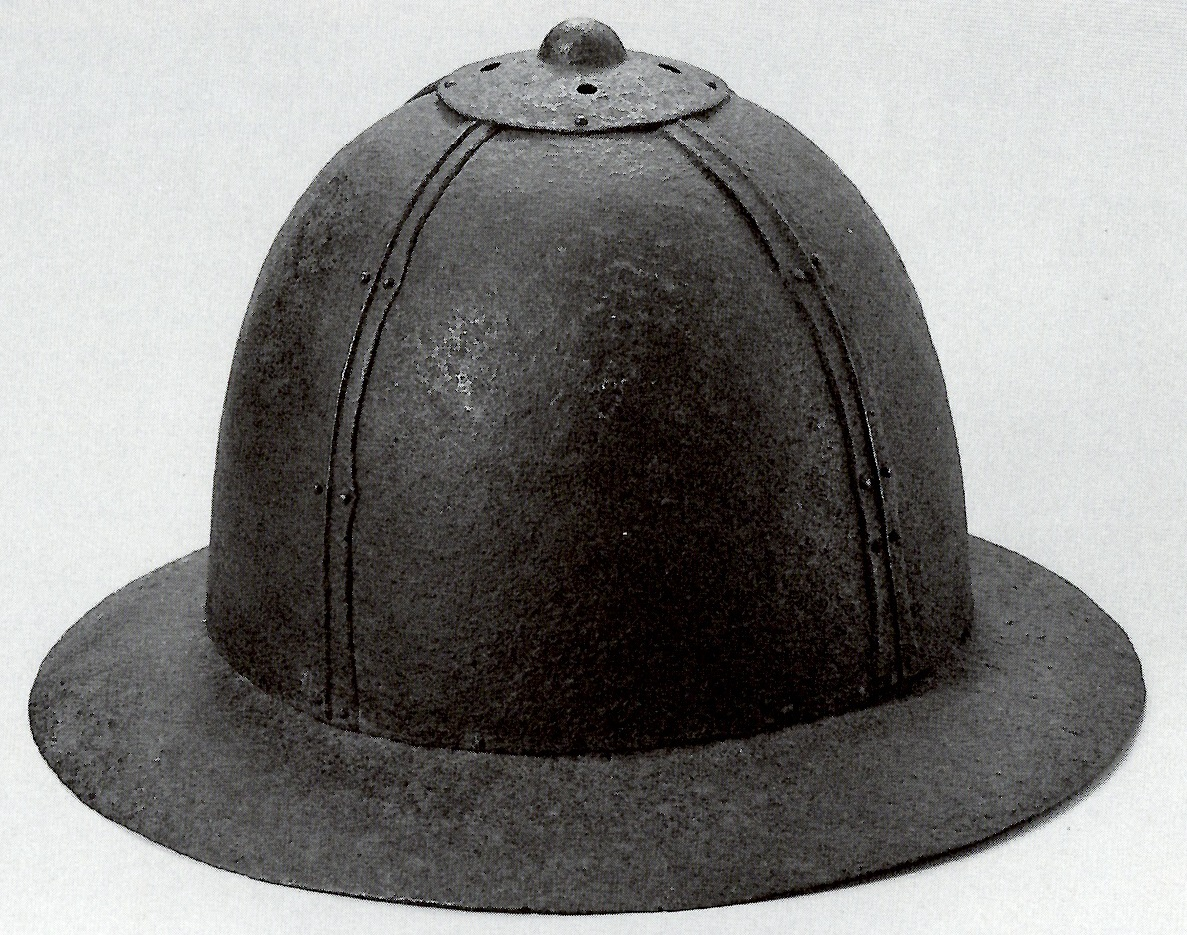
Yuan helmet

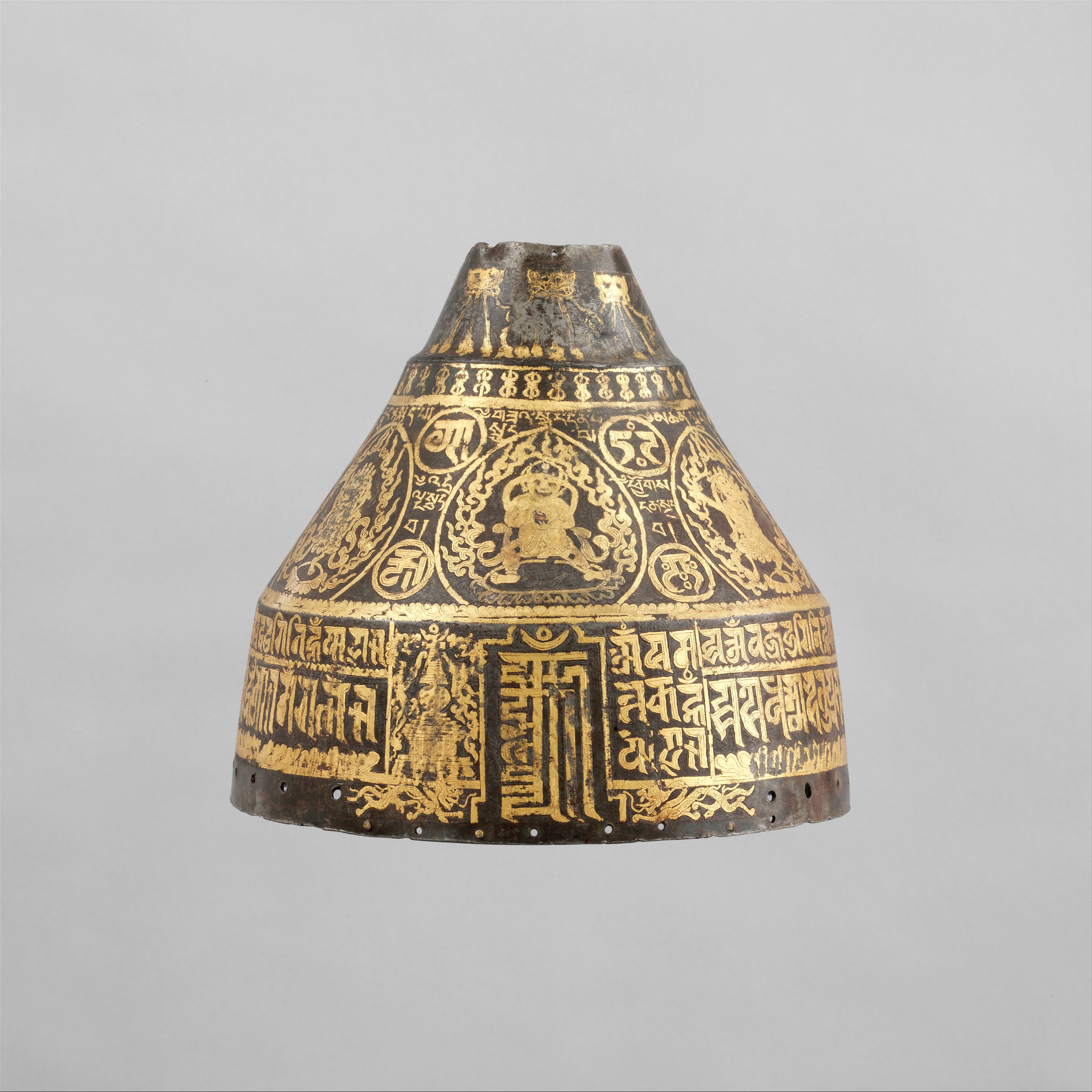
Mongol helmet, 15th-17th c.

== See also ==
- Laminar armour
