= Trousers =

Clothing for the legs and lower body

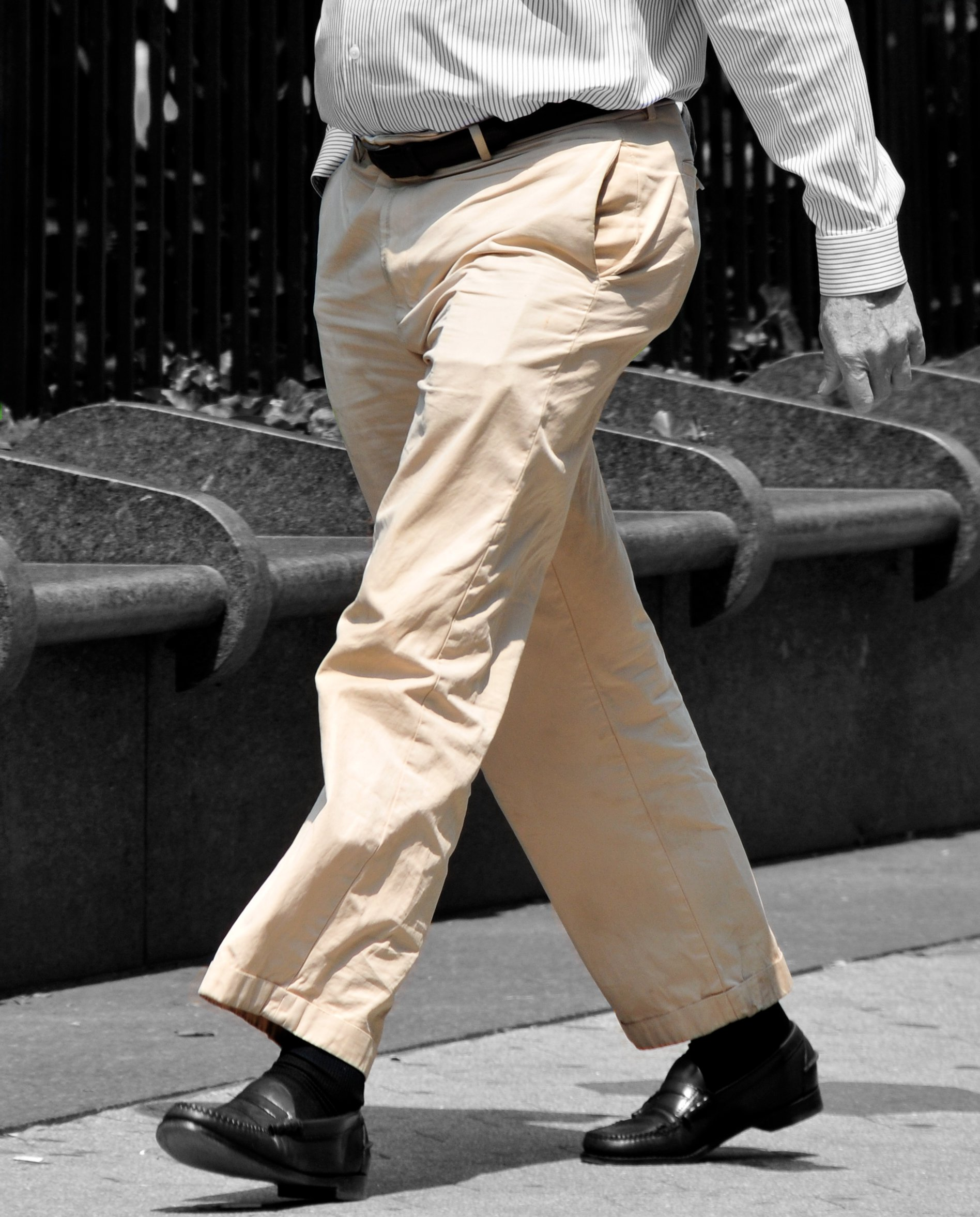
- Man wearing a pair of trousers
- Material: Materials used to produce trousers: Cotton; Polyester; Wool; Linen; Denim; Nylon; Rayon; Spandex; Viscose; Elastane; Silk; Leather; Corduroy; Twill; Gabardine; Flannel; Velvet; Hemp
- Manufacturer: Various

Trousers (British English), slacks, or pants (North America, Australia and parts of Northern England) are an item of clothing worn from the waist to anywhere between the knees and the ankles, covering both legs separately (rather than with cloth extending across both legs as in robes, skirts, dresses, and kilts). Shorts are similar to trousers, but with legs that come down only as far as the knee, but may be considerably shorter depending on the style of the garment. To distinguish them from shorts, trousers may be called "long trousers" in certain contexts such as school uniform, where tailored shorts may be called "short trousers" in the UK.

The oldest known trousers, dating to the period between the thirteenth and the tenth centuries BC, were found at the Yanghai cemetery in Turpan, Xinjiang (Tocharia), in present-day western China. Made of wool, the trousers had straight legs and wide crotches and were likely made for horseback riding. A pair of trouser-like leggings dating back to 3350 and 3105 BC were found in the Austria–Italy border worn by Ötzi. In most of Europe, trousers have been worn since ancient times and throughout the Medieval period, becoming the most common form of lower-body clothing for adult males in the modern world. Breeches were worn instead of trousers in early modern Europe by some men in higher classes of society. Distinctive formal trousers are traditionally worn with formal and semi-formal day attire. Since the mid-twentieth century, trousers have increasingly been worn by women as well.

Jeans, made of denim, are a form of trousers for casual wear widely worn all over the world by people of both genders. Shorts are often preferred in hot weather or for some sports and also often by children and adolescents. Trousers are worn on the hips or waist and are often held up by buttons, elastic, a belt, or suspenders (braces). Unless elastic, and especially for men, trousers usually provide a zippered or buttoned fly. Jeans usually feature side and rear pockets with pocket openings placed slightly below the waist band. It is also possible for trousers to provide cargo pockets further down the legs.

Maintenance of fit is more challenging for trousers than for some other garments. Leg-length can be adjusted with a hem, which helps to retain fit during the adolescent and early adulthood growth years. Tailoring adjustment of girth to accommodate weight gain or weight loss is relatively limited, and otherwise serviceable trousers might need to be replaced after a significant change in body composition. Higher-quality trousers often have extra fabric included in the centre-back seam allowance, so the waist can be let out further.

== Terminology ==
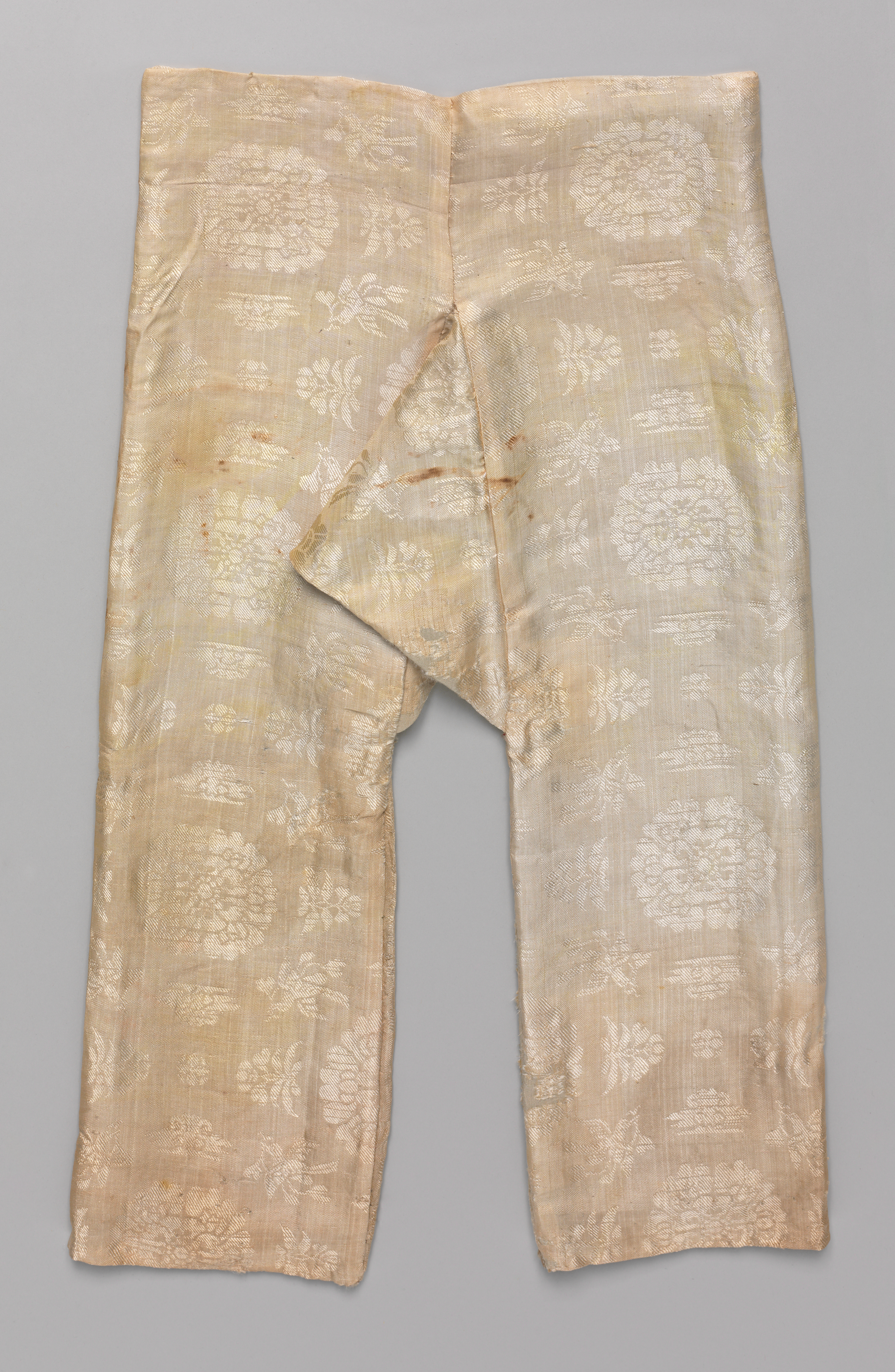
Silk trousers, Tang dynasty

In Scotland, a type of tartan trousers traditionally worn by Highlanders as an alternative to the Great Plaid and its predecessors is called trews or in the original Gaelic triubhas. This is the source of the English word trousers. Trews are still sometimes worn instead of the kilt at ceilidhs, weddings etc. Trousers are also known as breeks in Scots, the cognate of breeches. The item of clothing worn under trousers is called pants. The standard English form trousers is also used, but it is sometimes pronounced in a manner approximately represented by [ˈtruːzɨrz], as Scots did not completely undergo the Great Vowel Shift, and thus retains the vowel sound of the Gaelic triubhas, from which the word originates.

In North America, Australia, and South Africa, pants is the general category term, whereas trousers (sometimes slacks in Australia and North America) often refers more specifically to tailored garments with a waistband, belt-loops, and a fly-front. In these dialects, elastic-waist knitted garments would be called pants, but not trousers (or slacks).

North Americans call undergarments underwear, underpants, undies, or panties (the last are women's garments specifically) to differentiate them from other pants that are worn on the outside. The term drawers normally refers to undergarments, but in some dialects, may be found as a synonym for breeches, that is, trousers. In these dialects, the term underdrawers is used for undergarments. Many North Americans refer to their underpants by their type, such as boxers or briefs.

In Australia, men's underwear also has various informal terms including under-dacks, undies, dacks or jocks. In New Zealand, men's underwear is known informally as undies or dacks.

In India, underwear is also referred to as innerwear.

The words trouser (or pant) instead of trousers (or pants) is sometimes used in the tailoring and fashion industries as a generic term, for instance when discussing styles, such as "a flared trouser", rather than as a specific item. The words trousers and pants are pluralia tantum, nouns that generally only appear in plural form—much like the words scissors and tongs, and as such pair of trousers is the usual correct form. However, the singular form is used in some compound words, such as trouser-leg, trouser-press and trouser-bottoms.

Jeans are trousers typically made from denim or dungaree cloth.

=== Types ===
There are several different main types of pants and trousers, such as dress pants, jeans, khakis, chinos, leggings, overalls, and sweatpants. They can also be classified by fit, fabric, and other features. There is apparently no universal, overarching classification.

== History ==
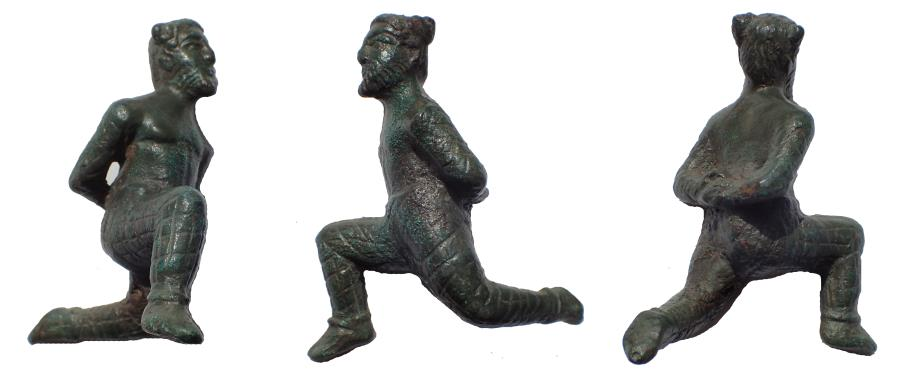
Roman Bronze Statuette of a Suebian wearing trousers. First to third century AD

=== Prehistory ===
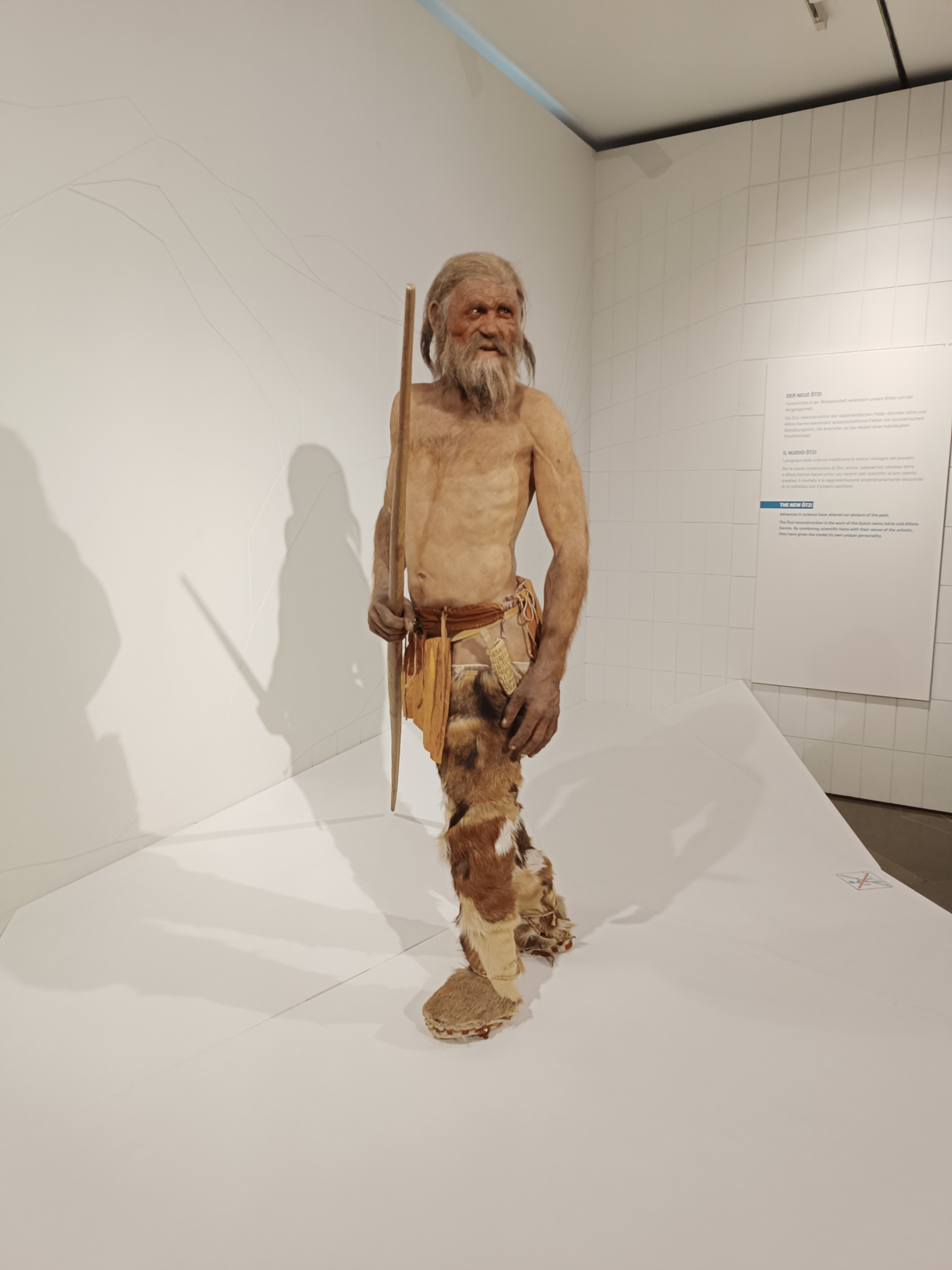
Reconstruction of Ötzi the Iceman who lived between 3350 and 3105 BC in the Ötztal Alps (Austria–Italy border) and he wore leggings that look like trousers

There is some evidence, from figurative art, of trousers being worn in the Upper Paleolithic, as seen on the figurines found at the Siberian sites of Mal'ta and Buret'. Fabrics and technology for their construction are fragile and disintegrate easily, so often are not among artefacts discovered in archaeological sites. The oldest known trousers were found at the Yanghai cemetery, extracted from mummies in Turpan, Xinjiang, western China, belonging to the people of the Tarim Basin; dated to the period between the thirteenth and the tenth century BC and made of wool, the trousers had straight legs and wide crotches, and were likely made for horseback riding.

=== Antiquity ===
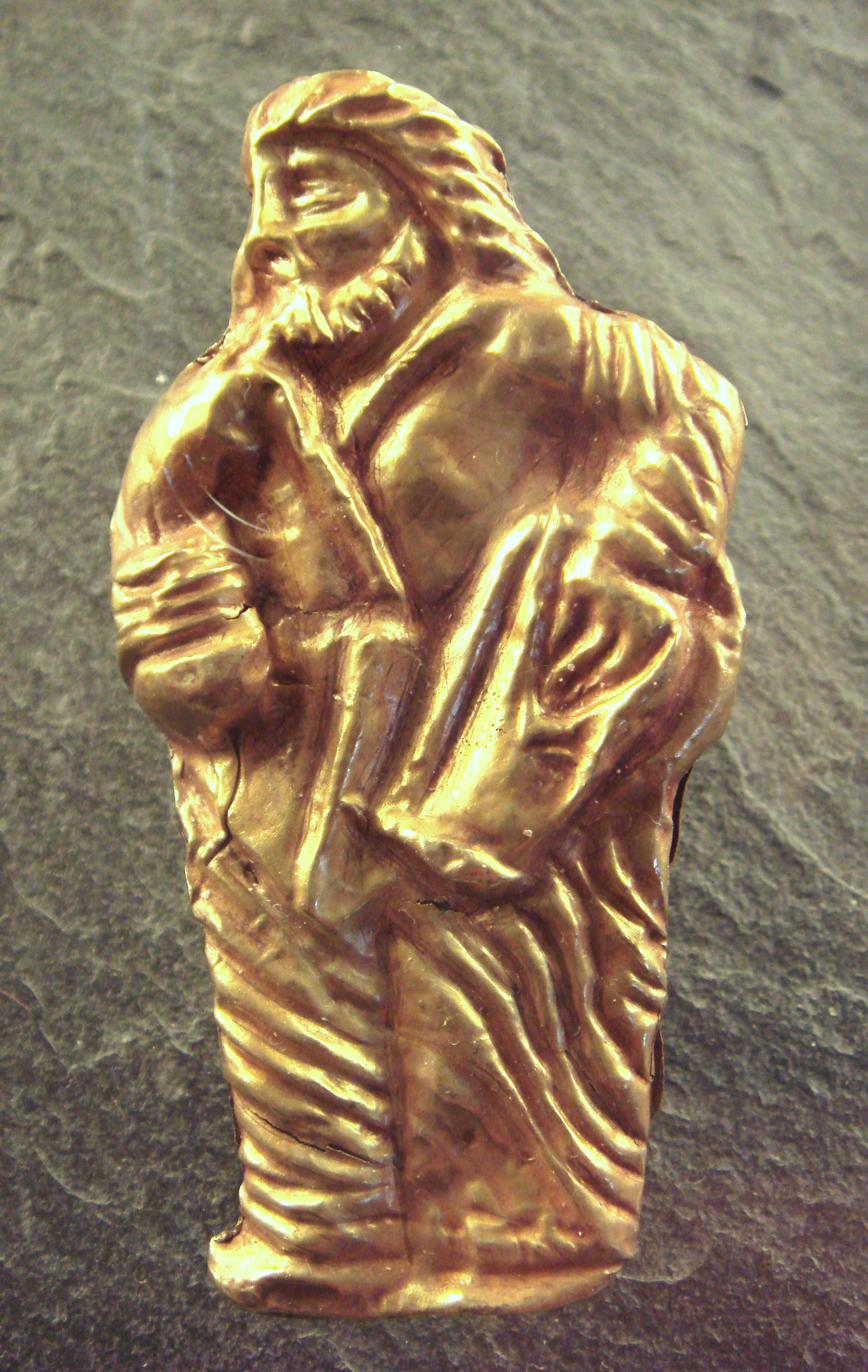
Scythian wearing trousers

Remnants of short and long trousers remain from the mummified human remains in salt mines in Iran dating back to the Persian Empire. Trousers enter recorded history in the sixth century BC, on the rock carvings and artworks of Persepolis, and with the appearance of horse-riding Eurasian nomads in Greek ethnography. At this time, Iranian peoples such as Scythians, Sarmatians, Sogdians and Bactrians among others, along with Armenians and Eastern and Central Asian peoples such as the Xiongnu/Hunnu, are known to have worn trousers. Trousers are believed to have been worn by people of any gender among these early users.

The ancient Greeks used the term ἀναξυρίδες (anaxyrides) for the trousers worn by Eastern nations and σαράβαρα (sarabara) for the loose trousers worn by the Scythians. However, they did not wear trousers since they thought them ridiculous, using the word θύλακοι (thulakoi), pl. of θύλακος (thulakos) 'sack', as a slang term for the loose trousers of Persians and other Middle Easterners.

Republican Rome viewed the draped clothing of Greek and Minoan (Cretan) culture as an emblem of civilization and disdained trousers as the mark of barbarians. As the Roman Empire expanded beyond the Mediterranean basin, however, the greater warmth provided by trousers led to their adoption. Two types of trousers eventually saw widespread use in Rome: the feminalia, which fit snugly and usually fell to knee length or mid-calf length, and the braccae, loose-fitting trousers that were closed at the ankles. Both garments were adopted originally from the Celts of Europe, although later familiarity with the Persian Near East and the Germanic peoples increased acceptance. Feminalia and braccae both began use as military garments, spreading to civilian dress later, and were eventually made in a variety of materials, including leather, wool, cotton and silk.

=== Medieval Europe ===
Trousers of various designs were worn throughout the Middle Ages in Europe, especially by men. Loose-fitting trousers were worn in Byzantium under long tunics, and were worn by many tribes, such as the Germanic tribes that migrated to the Western Roman Empire in Late Antiquity and the Early Middle Ages, as evidenced by both artistic sources and such relics as the fourth-century costumes recovered from the Thorsberg peat bog (see illustration). Trousers in this period, generally called braies, varied in length and were often closed at the cuff or even had attached foot coverings, although open-legged pants were also seen.

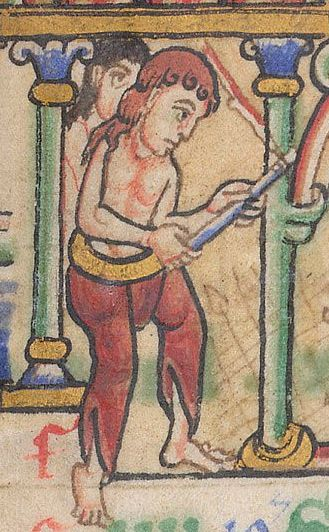
Psalter (the 'Shaftesbury Psalter') with calendar and prayers, England, second quarter of the twelfth century

By the eighth century there is evidence of the wearing in Europe of two layers of trousers, especially among upper-class males. The under layer is today referred to by costume historians as drawers, although that usage did not emerge until the late sixteenth century. Over the drawers were worn trousers of wool or linen, which in the tenth century began to be referred to as breeches in many places. Tightness of fit and length of leg varied by period, class, and geography. (Open legged trousers can be seen on the Norman soldiers of the Bayeux Tapestry.)

Although Charlemagne (742–814) is recorded to have habitually worn trousers, donning the Byzantine tunic only for ceremonial occasions, the influence of the Roman past and the example of Byzantium led to the increasing use of long tunics by men, hiding most of the trousers from view and eventually rendering them an undergarment for many. As undergarments, these trousers became briefer or longer as the length of the various medieval outer garments changed, and were met by, and usually attached to, another garment variously called hose or stockings.

In the fourteenth century it became common among the men of the noble and knightly classes to connect the hose directly to their pourpoints (the padded under jacket worn with armoured breastplates that would later evolve into the doublet) rather than to their drawers. In the fifteenth century, rising hemlines led to ever briefer drawers until they were dispensed with altogether by the most fashionable elites who joined their skin-tight hose back into trousers. These trousers, which we would today call tights but which were still called hose or sometimes joined hose at the time, emerged late in the fifteenth century and were conspicuous by their open crotch which was covered by an independently fastening front panel, the codpiece. The exposure of the hose to the waist was consistent with fifteenth-century trends, which also brought the pourpoint/doublet and the shirt, previously undergarments, into view, but the most revealing of these fashions were only ever adopted at court and not by the general population.

Men's clothes in Hungary in the fifteenth century consisted of a shirt and trousers as underwear, and a dolman worn over them, as well as a short fur-lined or sheepskin coat. Hungarians generally wore simple trousers, only their colour being unusual; the dolman covered the greater part of the trousers.

=== Europe before the 20th century ===
Around the turn of the sixteenth century it became conventional to separate hose into two pieces, one from the waist to the crotch which fastened around the top of the legs, called trunk hose, and the other running beneath it to the foot. The trunk hose soon reached down the thigh to fasten below the knee and were now usually called "breeches" to distinguish them from the lower-leg coverings still called hose or, sometimes stockings. By the end of the sixteenth century, the codpiece had also been incorporated into breeches which featured a fly or fall front opening.

As a modernization measure, Tsar Peter the Great of Russia issued a decree in 1701 commanding every Russian man, other than clergy and peasant farmers, to wear trousers.

Western dress shall be worn by all the boyars, members of our councils and of our court...gentry of Moscow, secretaries...provincial gentry, gosti,[3] government officials, streltsy,[4] members of the guilds purveying for our household, citizens of Moscow of all ranks, and residents of provincial cities...excepting the clergy and peasant tillers of the soil. The upper dress shall be of French or Saxon cut, and the lower dress...--waistcoat, trousers, boots, shoes, and hats--shall be of the German type

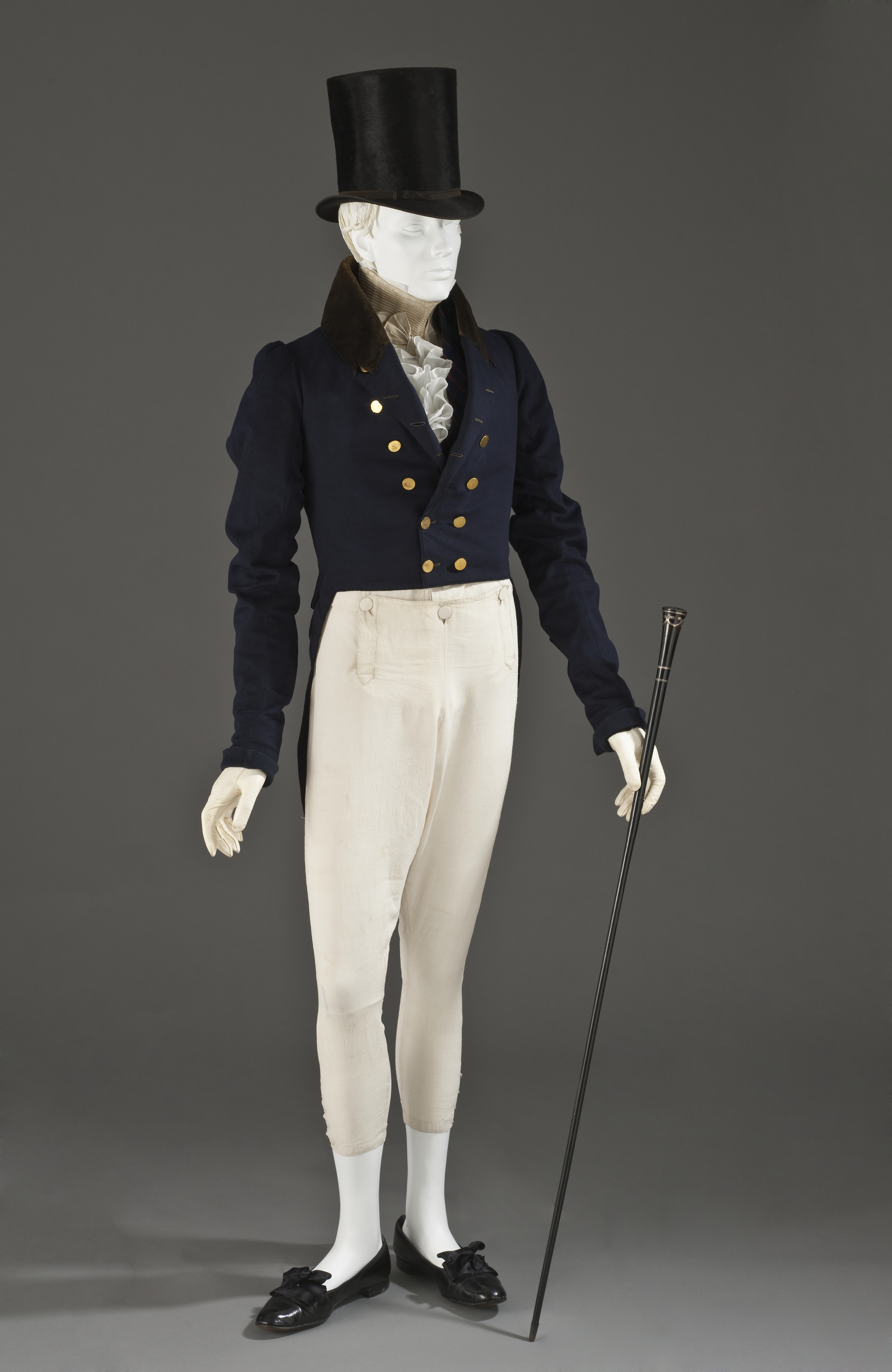
Pantaloons, Scotland, early 19th century

During the French Revolution of 1789 and following, many male citizens of France adopted a working-class costume including ankle-length trousers, or pantaloons (named from a Commedia dell'Arte character named Pantalone) in place of the aristocratic knee-breeches (culottes). (Compare sans-culottes.) The new garment of the revolutionaries differed from that of the ancien regime upper classes in three ways:

- it was loose where the style for breeches had most recently been form-fitting
- it was ankle length where breeches had generally been knee-length for more than two centuries
- they were open at the bottom while breeches were fastened

Pantaloons became fashionable in early nineteenth-century England and the Regency era. The style was introduced by Beau Brummell (1778–1840) and by mid-century had supplanted breeches as fashionable street-wear. At this point, even knee-length pants adopted the open bottoms of trousers (see shorts) and were worn by young boys, for sports, and in tropical climates. Breeches proper have survived into the twenty-first century as court dress, and also in baggy mid-calf (or three-quarter length) versions known as plus-fours or knickers worn for active sports and by young schoolboys. Types of breeches are also still worn today by fencers, baseball and American football players, and by equestrians.

Sailors may have played a role in the worldwide dissemination of trousers as a fashion. In the seventeenth and eighteenth centuries, sailors wore baggy trousers known as galligaskins. Sailors also pioneered the wearing of jeans – trousers made of denim. These became more popular in the late nineteenth century in the American West because of their ruggedness and durability.

Starting around the mid-nineteenth century, Wigan pit-brow women scandalized Victorian society by wearing trousers for their work at the local coal mines. They wore skirts over their trousers and rolled them up to their waists to keep them out of the way. Although pit-brow lasses worked above ground at the pit-head, their task of sorting and shovelling coal involved hard manual labour, so wearing the usual long skirts of the time would have greatly hindered their movements.

=== Medieval Korea ===
The Korean word for trousers, baji (originally pajibaji) first appears in recorded history around the turn of the fifteenth century, but pants may have been in use by Korean society for some time. From at least this time pants were worn by both sexes in Korea. Men wore trousers either as outer garments or beneath skirts, while it was unusual for adult women to wear their pants (termed sokgot) without a covering skirt. As in Europe, a wide variety of styles came to define regions, time periods and age and gender groups, from the unlined gouei to the padded sombaji.

=== Women wearing trousers ===
See also: the Laws section below.

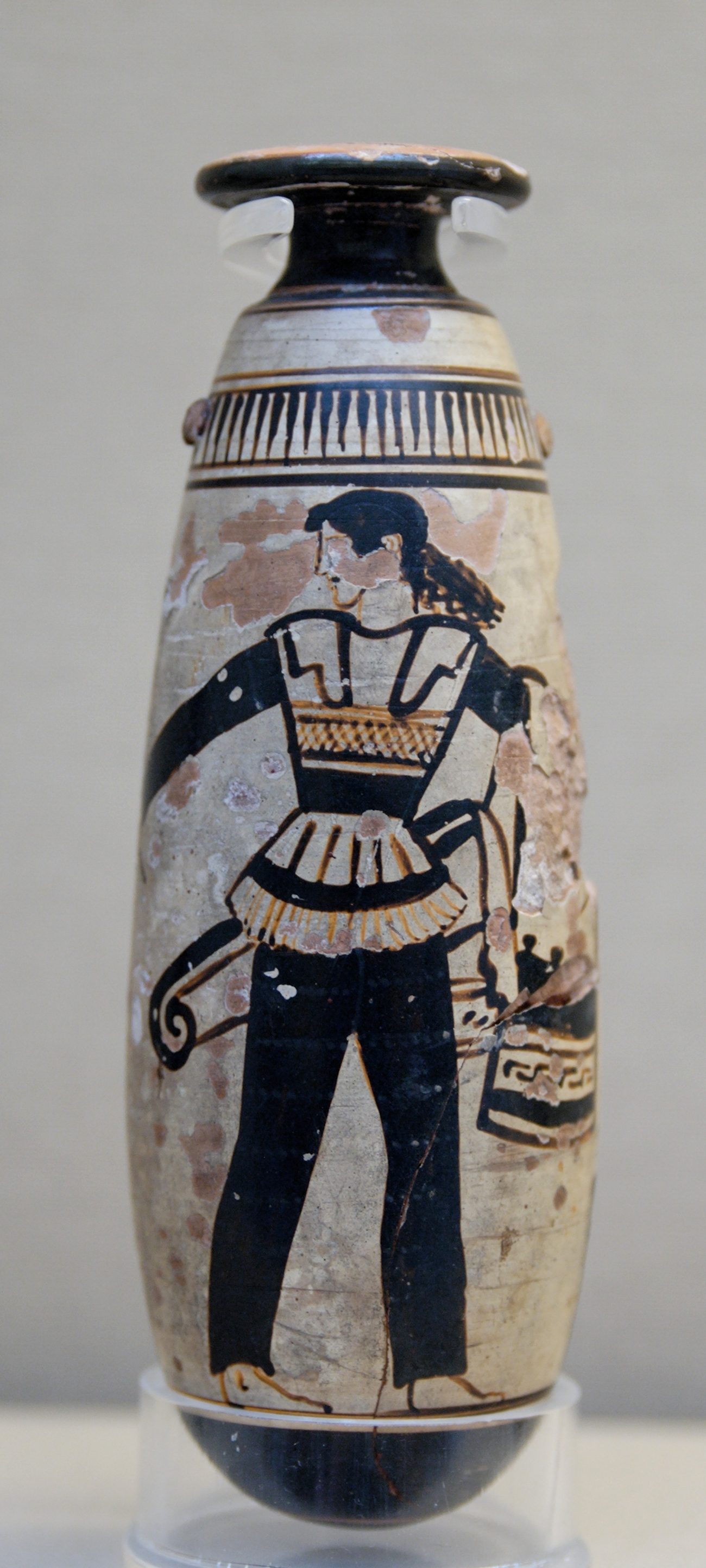
Amazon wearing trousers and carrying a shield with an attached patterned cloth and a quiver. Ancient Greek Attic white-ground alabastron, c. 470 BC, British Museum, London

In Western society, it was Eastern culture that inspired French designer Paul Poiret (1879–1944) to be one of the first to design pants for women. In 1913, Poiret created loose-fitting, wide-leg trousers for women called harem pants, which were based on the costumes of the popular ballet Sheherazade. Written by Nikolai Rimsky-Korsakov in 1888, Sheherazade was based on a collection of legends from the Middle East called 1001 Arabian Nights.

In the early twentieth century, women air pilots and other working women often wore trousers. Frequent photographs from the 1930s of actresses Marlene Dietrich and Katharine Hepburn in trousers helped make trousers acceptable for women. During World War II, women employed in factories or doing other "men's work" on war service wore trousers when the job demanded it. In the post-war era, trousers became acceptable casual wear for gardening, the beach, and other leisure pursuits. In Britain during World War II the rationing of clothing prompted women to wear their husbands' civilian clothes, including trousers, to work while the men were serving in the armed forces. This was partly because they were seen as practical for work, but also so that women could keep their clothing allowance for other uses. As this practice of wearing trousers became more widespread and as the men's clothing wore out, replacements were needed. By the summer of 1944, it was reported that sales of women's trousers were five times more than the previous year.

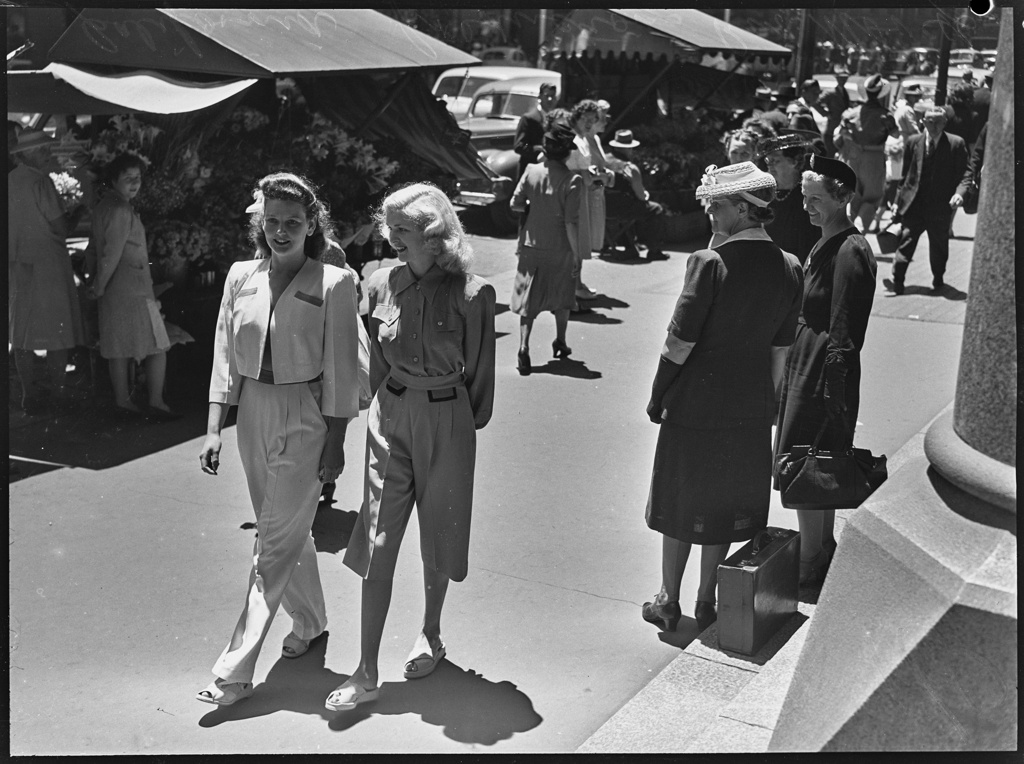
Women wearing slacks, Sydney, 1946

In 1919, Luisa Capetillo challenged mainstream society by becoming the first woman in Puerto Rico to wear trousers in public. Capetillo was sent to jail for what was considered to be a crime, but the charges were later dropped.

In the 1960s, André Courrèges introduced long trousers for women as a fashion item, leading to the era of the pantsuit and designer jeans and the gradual erosion of social prohibitions against girls and women wearing trousers in schools, the workplace and in fine restaurants.

In 1969, Rep. Charlotte Reid (R-Ill.) became the first woman to wear trousers in the US Congress.

Pat Nixon was the first American First Lady to wear trousers in public.

In 1989, California state senator Rebecca Morgan became the first woman to wear trousers in a US state senate.

Hillary Clinton was the first woman to wear trousers in an official American First Lady portrait.

Women were not allowed to wear trousers on the US Senate floor until 1993. In 1993, Senators Barbara Mikulski and Carol Moseley Braun wore trousers onto the floor in defiance of the rule, and female support staff followed soon after; the rule was amended later that year by Senate Sergeant-at-Arms Martha Pope to allow women to wear trousers on the floor so long as they also wore a jacket.

In Malawi women were not legally allowed to wear trousers under President Kamuzu Banda's rule until 1994. This law was introduced in 1965.

Since 2004 the International Skating Union has allowed women to wear trousers instead of skirts in ice-skating competitions.

In 2009, journalist Lubna Hussein was fined the equivalent of $200 when a court found her guilty of violating Sudan's decency laws by wearing trousers.

In 2012 the Royal Canadian Mounted Police began to allow women to wear trousers and boots with all their formal uniforms.

In 2012 and 2013, some Mormon women participated in "Wear Pants to Church Day", in which they wore trousers to church instead of the customary dresses to encourage gender equality within the Church of Jesus Christ of Latter-day Saints. More than one thousand women participated in 2012.

In 2013, Turkey's parliament ended a ban on women lawmakers wearing trousers in its assembly.

Also in 2013, an old bylaw requiring women in Paris, France to ask permission from city authorities before "dressing as men", including wearing trousers (with exceptions for those "holding a bicycle handlebar or the reins of a horse") was declared officially revoked by France's Women's Rights Minister, Najat Vallaud-Belkacem. The bylaw was originally intended to prevent women from wearing the pantalons fashionable with Parisian rebels in the French Revolution.

In 2014, an Indian family court in Mumbai ruled that a husband objecting to his wife wearing a kurta and jeans and forcing her to wear a sari amounts to cruelty inflicted by the husband and can be a ground to seek divorce. The wife was thus granted a divorce on the ground of cruelty as defined under section 27(1)(d) of the Special Marriage Act, 1954.

Until 2016 some female crew members on British Airways were required to wear British Airways' standard "ambassador" uniform, which has not traditionally included trousers.

In 2017, The Church of Jesus Christ of Latter-day Saints announced that its female employees could wear "professional pantsuits and dress slacks" while at work; dresses and skirts had previously been required. In 2018 it was announced that female missionaries of that church could wear dress slacks except when attending the temple and during Sunday worship services, baptismal services, and mission leadership and zone conferences.

In 2019, Virgin Atlantic began to allow its female flight attendants to wear trousers.

== Parts of trousers ==
Parts of men's trousers

=== Pleats ===
Pleats located just below the waistband on the front typify many styles of formal and casual trousers, including suit trousers and khakis. There may be one, two, three, or no pleats, which may face either direction. When the pleats open toward the pockets they are called reverse pleats (typical of most trousers today) and when they open toward the fly they are known as forward pleats.

=== Pockets ===
In modern trousers, men's models generally have pockets for carrying small items such as wallets, keys or mobile phones, but women's trousers often do not – and sometimes have what are called Potemkin pockets, a fake slit sewn shut. If there are pockets, they are often much smaller than in men's clothes. In 2018, journalists at The Pudding found less than half of women's front pockets could fit a thin wallet, let alone a handheld phone and keys. 'On average, the pockets in women's jeans are 48% shorter and 6.5% narrower than men's pockets.' This gender difference is usually explained by diverging priorities; as French fashion designer Christian Dior allegedly said in 1954: 'Men have pockets to keep things in, women for decoration.'

=== Cuffs/Bottom hem ===
Trouser-makers can finish the legs by hemming the bottom to prevent fraying. Trousers with turn-ups (cuffs in American English), after hemming, are rolled outward and sometimes pressed or stitched into place.

=== Fly ===
A fly is a covering over an opening join concealing the mechanism, such as a zipper, velcro, or buttons, used to join the opening. In trousers, this is most commonly an opening covering the groin, which makes the pants easier to put on or take off. The opening also allows men to urinate without lowering their trousers.

Trousers have varied historically in whether or not they have a fly. Originally, hose did not cover the area between the legs. This was instead covered by a doublet or by a codpiece. When breeches were worn, during the Regency period for example, they were fall-fronted (or broad fall). Later, after trousers (pantaloons) were invented, the fly-front (split fall) emerged. The panelled front returned as a sporting option, such as in riding breeches, but is now hardly ever used, a fly being by far the most common fastening. Most flies now use a zipper, though button-fly pants continue to be available.

=== Trouser support ===
At present, most trousers are held up through the assistance of a belt which is passed through the belt loops on the waistband of the trousers. However, this was traditionally a style acceptable only for casual trousers and work trousers; suit trousers and formal trousers were suspended by the use of braces (suspenders in American English) attached to buttons located on the interior or exterior of the waistband. Today, this remains the preferred method of trouser support amongst adherents of classical British tailoring. Many men claim this method is more effective and more comfortable because it requires no cinching of the waist or periodic adjustment.

== Society ==
In modern Western society, men customarily wear trousers and not skirts or dresses. There are exceptions, however, such as the ceremonial Scottish kilt and Greek fustanella, as well as robes or robe-like clothing such as the cassocks of clergy and the academic robes, both rarely worn today in daily use. (See also Men's skirts.)

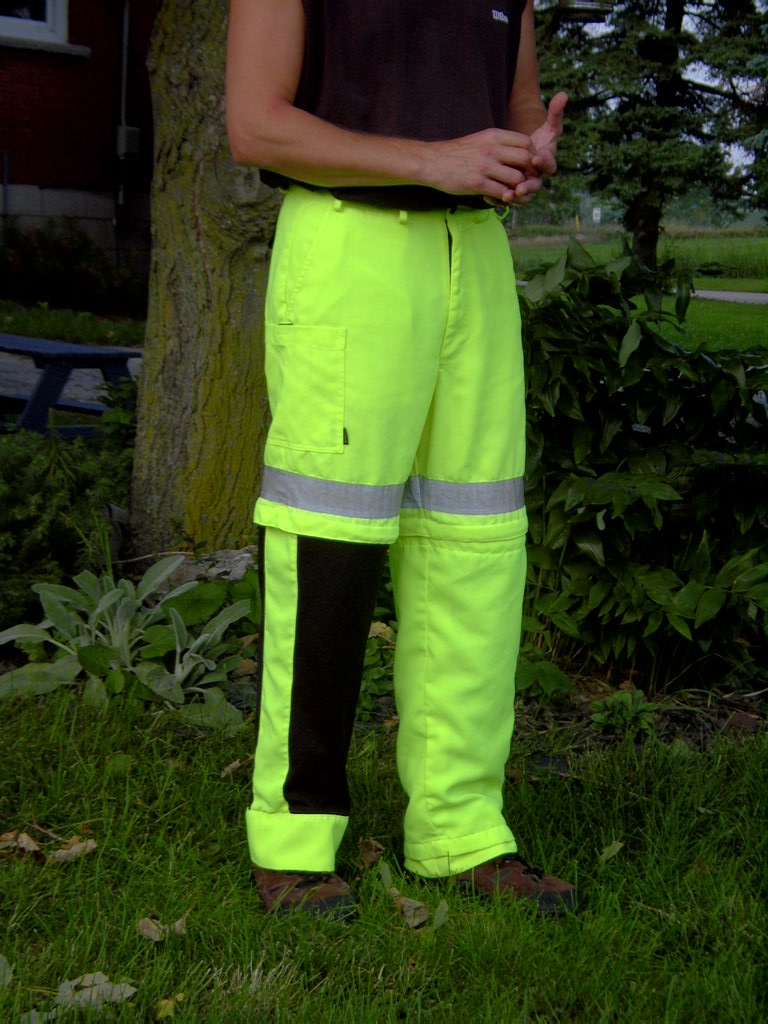
Convertible Ventilated Trousers shown with one leg cover removed

Among certain groups, low-rise, baggy trousers exposing underwear became fashionable; for example, among skaters and in 1990s hip hop fashion. This fashion is called sagging or, alternatively, "busting slack".

Cut-offs are homemade shorts made by cutting the legs off trousers, usually after holes have been worn in fabric around the knees. This extends the useful life of the trousers. The remaining leg fabric may be hemmed or left to fray after being cut.

=== Religion ===
Based on Deuteronomy 22:5 in the Bible ("A woman shall not wear a man’s apparel, nor shall a man put on a woman’s garment, for whoever does such things is abhorrent to the Lord your God."), some groups, including the Amish, Hutterites, some Mennonites, some Baptists, a few Church of Christ groups, and most Orthodox Jews, believe that women should not wear trousers. These groups permit women to wear underpants as long as they are hidden. By contrast, many Muslim sects approve of pants as they are considered more modest than any skirt that is shorter than ankle length. However, some mosques require ankle length trousers for both Muslims and non-Muslims on the premises.

The Catholic Pope Nicholas I approved of both men and women wearing pants. In 866, he wrote in response to the Bulgar Kahn St Boris the Baptiser, "For whether you or your women wear or do not wear pants neither impedes your salvation nor leads to any increase of your virtue." He then proceeded to expound the virtue of wearing the "spiritual pants" in the form of a temperate life while restraining disordered passions.

== Laws ==
=== France ===
In 2013, a long-unenforced law requiring women in Paris to ask permission from city authorities before "dressing as men", including wearing trousers (with exceptions for those "holding a bicycle handlebar or the reins of a horse") was declared officially revoked by France's Women's Rights Minister, Najat Vallaud-Belkacem. The bylaw was originally intended to prevent women from wearing the pantalons fashionable with Parisian rebels in the French Revolution.

=== India ===
In 2014, an Indian family court in Mumbai ruled that a husband objecting to his wife wearing a kurta and jeans and forcing her to wear a sari amounts to cruelty inflicted by the husband and can be a ground to seek divorce. The wife was thus granted a divorce on the ground of cruelty as defined under section 27(1)(d) of Special Marriage Act, 1954.

=== Italy ===
In Rome in 1992, a 45-year-old driving instructor was accused of rape. When he picked up an 18-year-old for her first driving lesson, he allegedly raped her for an hour, then told her that if she was to tell anyone he would kill her. Later that night she told her parents and her parents agreed to help her press charges. While the alleged rapist was convicted and sentenced, the Supreme Court of Cassation overturned the conviction in 1998 because the victim wore tight jeans. It was argued that she must have necessarily have had to help her attacker remove her jeans, thus making the act consensual ("because the victim wore very, very tight jeans, she had to help him remove them...and by removing the jeans...it was no longer rape but consensual sex"). The court stated in its decision "it is a fact of common experience that it is nearly impossible to slip off tight jeans even partly without the active collaboration of the person who is wearing them." This ruling sparked widespread feminist protest. The day after the decision, women in the Italian Parliament protested by wearing jeans and holding placards that read "Jeans: An Alibi for Rape". As a sign of support, the California Senate and Assembly followed suit. Soon Patricia Giggans, executive director of the Los Angeles Commission on Assaults Against Women, (now Peace Over Violence) made Denim Day an annual event. As of 2011 at least 20 U.S. states officially recognize Denim Day in April. Wearing jeans on this day, 22 April, has become an international symbol of protest. In 2008 the Supreme Court of Cassation overturned the ruling, so there is no longer a "denim" defense to the charge of rape.

=== Malawi ===
In Malawi, women were not legally allowed to wear trousers under President Kamuzu Banda's rule until 1994. This law was introduced in 1965.

=== Puerto Rico ===
In 1919, Luisa Capetillo challenged mainstream society by becoming the first woman in Puerto Rico to wear trousers in public. Capetillo was sent to jail for what was then considered to be a crime, but the judge later dropped the charges against her.

=== Turkey ===
In 2013, Turkey's parliament ended a ban on women lawmakers wearing trousers in its assembly.

=== Sudan ===
In Sudan, Article 152 of the Memorandum to the 1991 Penal Code prohibits the wearing of "obscene outfits" in public. This law has been used to arrest and prosecute women wearing trousers. Thirteen women including journalist Lubna al-Hussein were arrested in Khartoum in July 2009 for wearing trousers; ten of the women pleaded guilty and were flogged with ten lashes and fined 250 Sudanese pounds apiece. Lubna al-Hussein considers herself a good Muslim and asserts "Islam does not say whether a woman can wear trousers or not. I'm not afraid of being flogged. It doesn't hurt. But it is insulting." She was eventually found guilty and fined the equivalent of $200 rather than being flogged.

=== United States ===
In May 2004, in Louisiana, Democrat and state legislator Derrick Shepherd proposed a bill that would make it a crime to appear in public wearing trousers below the waist and thereby exposing one's skin or "intimate clothing". The Louisiana bill did not pass.

In February 2005, Virginia legislators tried to pass a similar law that would have made punishable by a $50 fine "any person who, while in a public place, intentionally wears and displays his below-waist undergarments, intended to cover a person's intimate parts, in a lewd or indecent manner". (It is not clear whether, with the same coverage by the trousers, exposing underwear was considered worse than exposing bare skin, or whether the latter was already covered by another law.) The law passed in the Virginia House of Delegates. However, various criticisms to it arose. For example, newspaper columnists and radio talk show hosts consistently said that since most people that would be penalized under the law would be young African-American men, the law would thus be a form of racial discrimination. Virginia's state senators voted against passing the law.

In California, Government Code Section 12947.5 (part of the California Fair Employment and Housing Act (FEHA)) expressly protects the right to wear pants. Thus, the standard California FEHA discrimination complaint form includes an option for "denied the right to wear pants".

== See also ==
- Capri pants
- Churidar
- Clothing sizes
- Low-rise pants
- Oxford bags
- Pantsuit
- Shorts
- Fisherman pants
- Trouser clips
