= Arming point =

Reinforced sections of gambesons

Arming points are reinforced sections of a gambeson or arming doublet where pieces of body armor were laced on.

Illustration of arming points and tresses on a doublet.

During the Medieval and Renaissance periods of European history, arming points allowed heavy armor to be fastened securely to a cloth undergarment via cloth or leather laces. These fastenings evolved from civilian clothing, which used similar tresses to attach sleeves and hose to a doublet, and to hold heavy coats together. The concept itself predated the Middle Ages, as both Greeks and Romans "used larger pieces of bronze and, later, iron fastened together with internal leathers..." The popularization of full plate armour, however, required specially-made gambesons or arming doublets that could support heavy pieces of armour.

Arming points make custom armor fit appropriately, leading to a great deal of variation in the construction of arming points. While the hose supporting an arming point on the leg could be made from worsted cloth, for example, additional padding or "blanketing" was usually added to the knee to prevent painful chafing. Specific arming points needed to be secured first if a warrior was dressing in full plate armour, beginning with the feet and moving upward. This process allowed plates to overlap, creating a glancing surface that would direct the potentially lethal force of a blow away from the body. Even if the armor was successful in redirecting such a blow, soft points on the body such as the elbow, neck, and knees required arming points with "rivets in which there is a certain amount of play" to ensure that the body could move with the force of a blow.
