= Jerkin =

Man's short close-fitting jacket

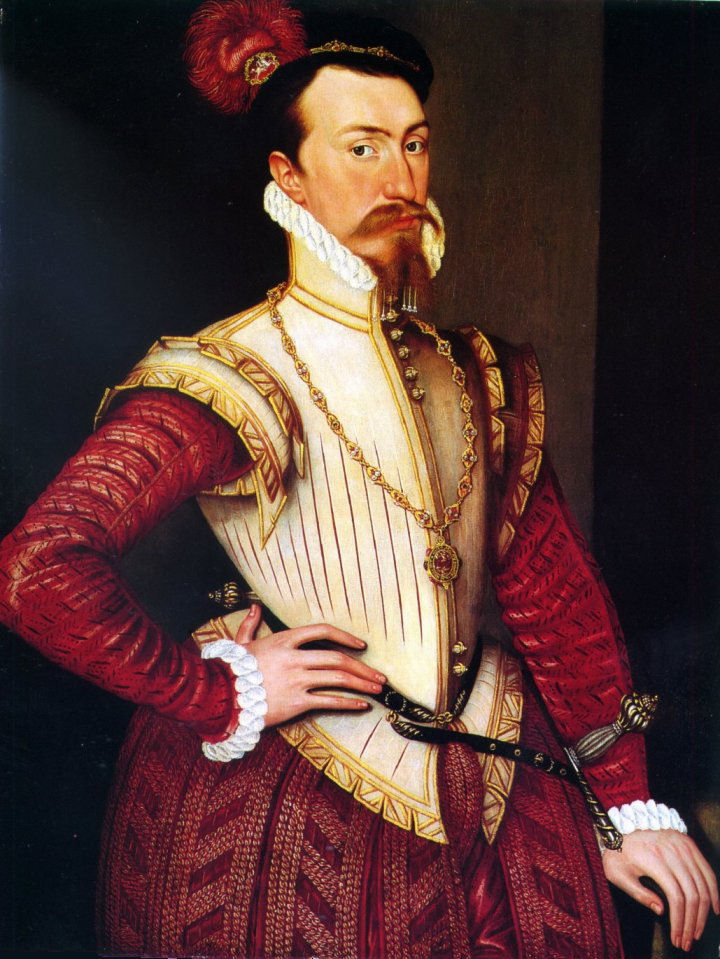
Robert Dudley in a slashed, probably leather, jerkin of the 1560s

A jerkin is a man's short close-fitting jacket, made usually of light-coloured leather, and often without sleeves, worn over the doublet in the 16th and 17th centuries. The term is also applied to a similar sleeveless garment worn by the British Army in the 20th century. A buff jerkin is an oiled oxhide jerkin, as worn by soldiers.

The origin of the word is unknown. The Dutch word jurk, a dress, taken in the past as the source, is modern, and represents neither the sound nor the sense of the English word.

== Sixteenth and seventeenth centuries ==
Leather jerkins of the 16th century were often slashed and punched, both for decoration and to improve the fit.

Jerkins were worn closed at the neck and hanging open over the peascod-bellied fashion of the doublet. At the turn of the 17th century, the fashion was to wear the jerkin buttoned at the waist and open above to reflect the fashionable narrow-waisted silhouette.

By the mid-17th century, jerkins were high-waisted and long-skirted like doublets of the period.

=== Gallery ===
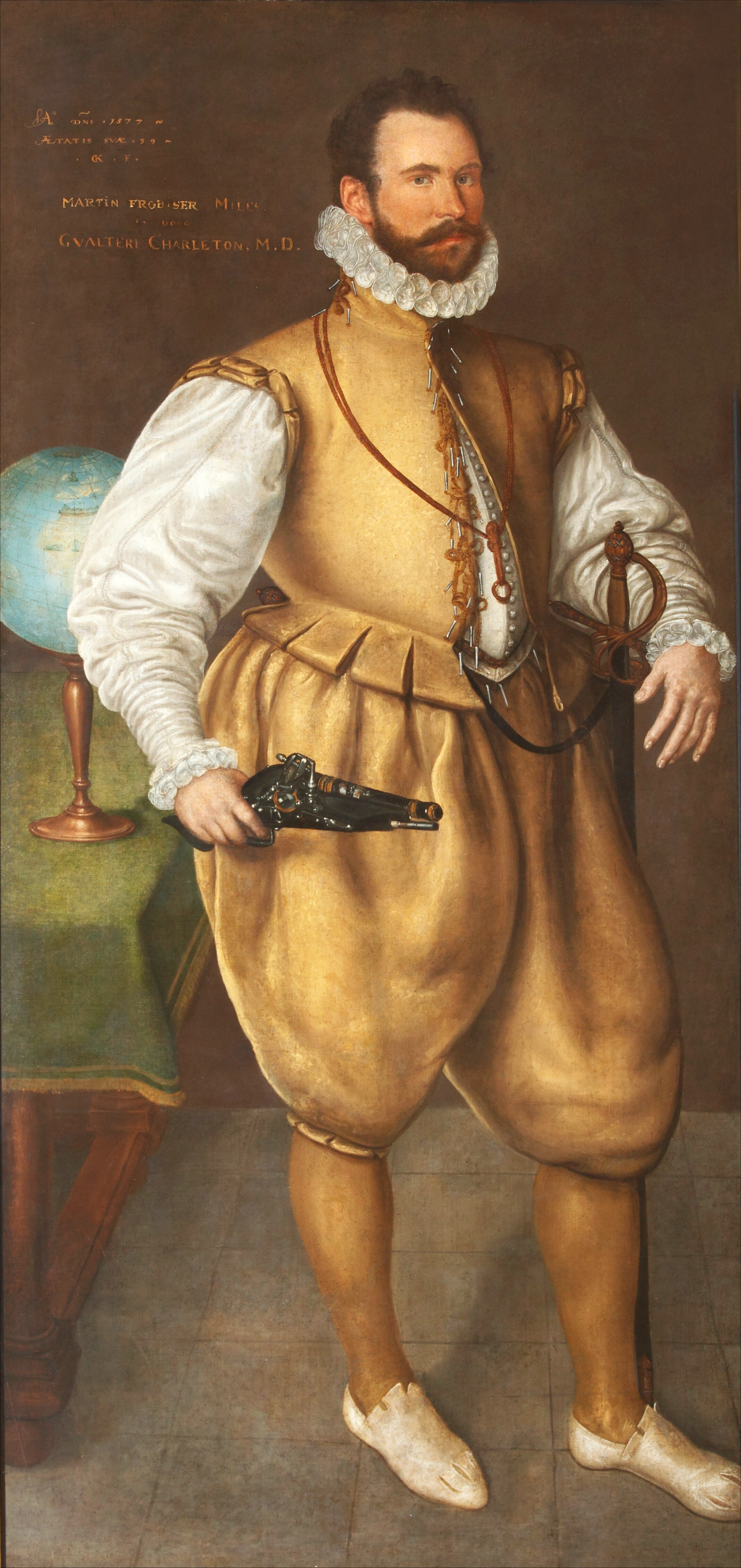
Martin Frobisher wears his jerkin closed at the neck and open below, 1570s.

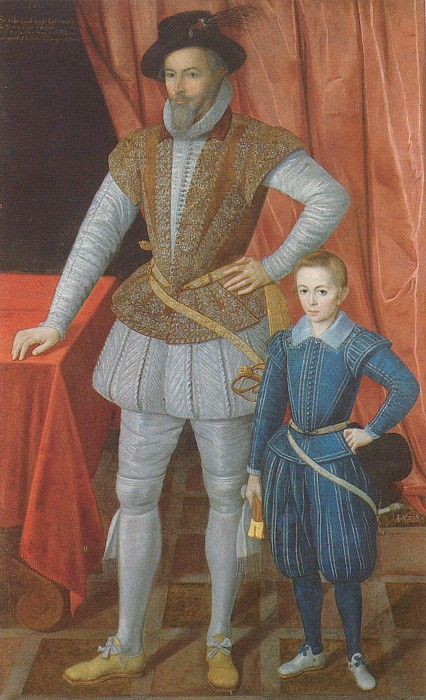
Sir Walter Raleigh wears his jerkin closed at the waist, 1602. His son wears a similar garment.

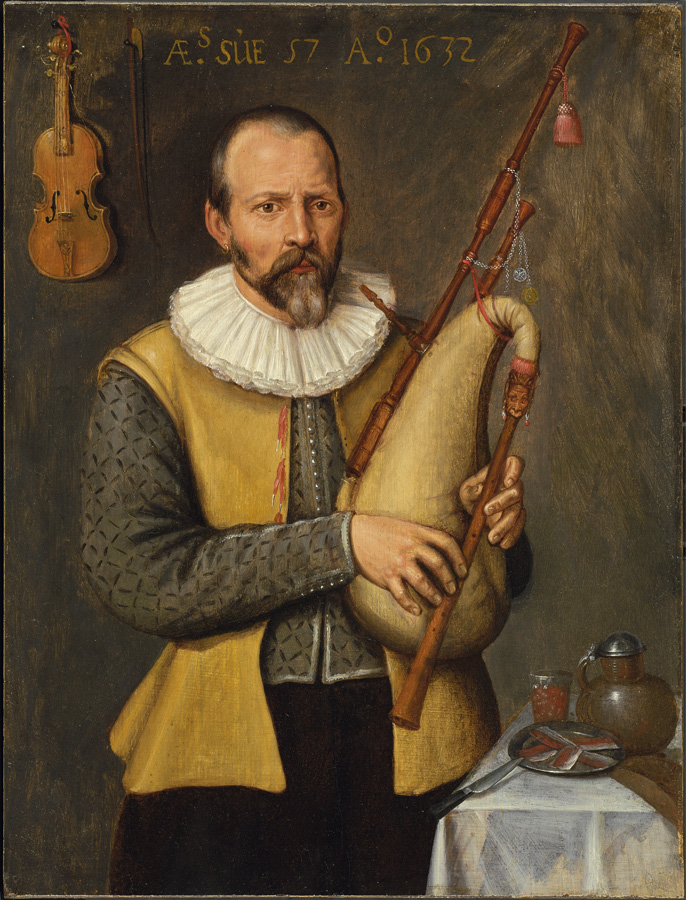
Dutch musician wears a jerkin with ribbon points as fasteners, 1632.

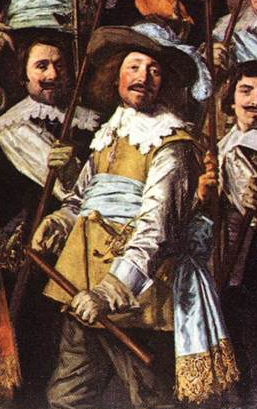
Guardsman's buff jerkin worn with a sash, c. 1639, from a painting by Frans Hals.

== 20th century ==
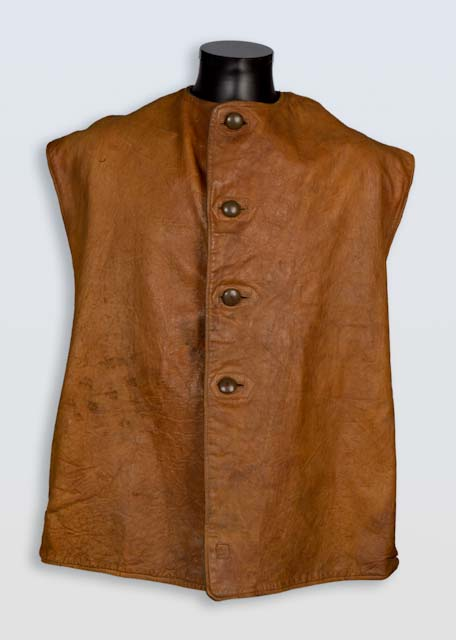
Jerkin worn by a British soldier at the Battle of the Somme

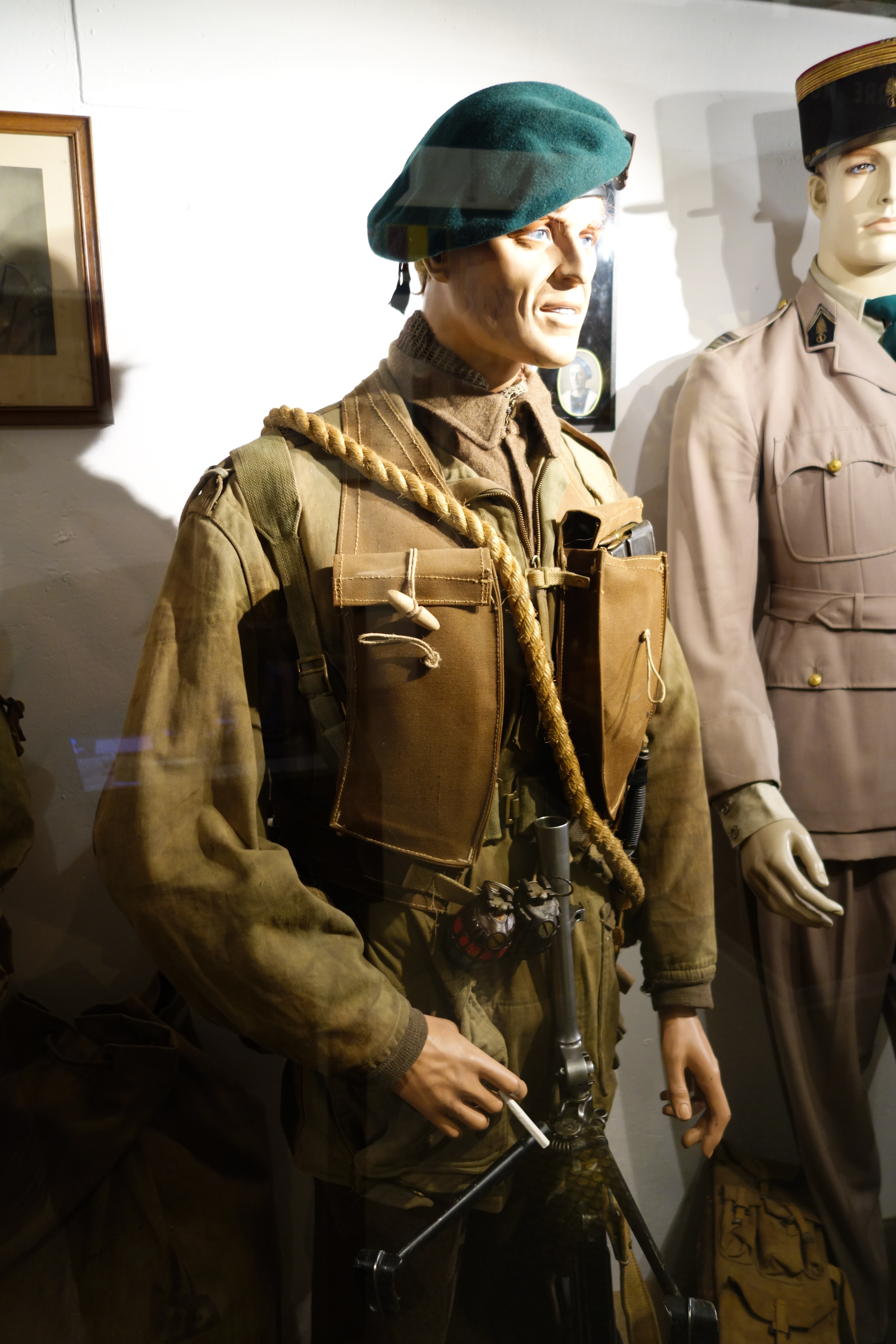
Battle Jerkin, a proto tactical load bearing vest used on D-Day

During the First World War, the British army issued brown leather jerkins to the troops as a measure to protect against the cold and to allow freedom of movement. These garments generally had four buttons and were lined with khaki wool. They were practical, hardwearing and appreciated by officers and other ranks alike. By the time of the Second World War, the leather jerkins were still on issue to all the Commonwealth forces and were universally popular. Jerkins made in Canada were dark brown with black wool linings and differed in general appearance from the British jerkins.

The jerkins from WWII had bakelite buttons instead of the brass or brown leather of the originals, and were each unique in that they were finished around the bottom edges with offcuts to eliminate waste. (It has been suggested that many of the WWII jerkins were made from leather remaining from the Irvin flying jackets also in production in the UK. The flying jackets were made of sheepskin so this may not be the case). Jerkins remained warm and comfortable garments to wear while fighting, working or driving, and came to characterise the British forces as a preferred alternative to the heavy greatcoats that other armies persisted with. Horsehide Leather Jerkins of the Great War/Second World War pattern continued to be produced into the late 1950s before being replaced with a version made of artificial leather.

A practical garment known as the Battle Jerkin was developed in 1942 by Colonel Rivers-MacPherson of the British Army. A modification of the English hunting vest, it was developed into a garment made of heavy-duty dark brown, water-repellent canvas with multiple pockets and attachment points for field equipment such as the standard issue entrenching tool that formed part of the 1937 pattern web equipment. While originally intended to replace the conventional web gear then in use, the original Battle Jerkin was found to be cumbersome and lacking the modularity of 1937 Pattern webbing to add and remove items as demanded by operational realities. The garment was found to cause soldiers to overheat during strenuous activities, and very limited numbers were issued to assault troops for the Normandy landings. A lighter, skeletalised version consisting only of a Y-shaped back piece and two large ammunition pouches on the chest as well as webbing straps for attaching other kit was used widely by commando personnel in 1944–45 to carry ammunition.

During the post-war period, a much less distinctive PVC version of the Leather Jerkin was introduced to British forces with the final version being produced in olive green with a mesh back strengthened with nylon straps printed with DPM camouflage. The Belgian Army also produced vinyl jerkins in the postwar era.

WD surplus leather jerkins flooded the UK during the 1950s and 1960s and were a common sight on manual workmen across the country. Wartime vintage leather jerkins are now collector's items, and at least one UK firm has produced a facsimile.

== See also ==
- 1550–1600 in fashion
- 1600–1650 in fashion
