= Gambeson =

Medieval defensive jacket

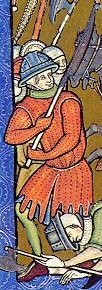
Depiction of a 13th-century gambeson (Morgan Bible, fol. 10r)

A gambeson (also known as, or similar to where historic or modern distinctions are made, the acton, aketon, padded jack, pourpoint, paltock, haustement, or arming doublet) is a padded defensive jacket, worn as armour separately, or combined with mail or plate armour. Gambesons were produced with a sewing technique called quilting or pourpointing that produced a padded cloth. They were usually constructed of linen or wool; the stuffing varied, and could be, for example, scrap cloth or horse hair.

An arming doublet worn under armour, particularly plate armour of fifteenth- and sixteenth-century Europe, contains arming points for attaching plates. Fifteenth-century examples may include mail goussets sewn into the elbows and armpits, to protect the wearer in locations not covered by plate. German gothic armour arming doublets were generally shorter than Italian white armour doublets, which could extend to the upper thigh. In late fifteenth-century Italy, this also became a civilian fashion. Men who were not knights wore arming doublets, probably because the garment suggested status and chivalry.

== Etymology ==
The term gambeson is a loan from the Old French gambeson, gambaison, originally wambais, formed after the Middle High German term wambeis, 'doublet', in turn from Old High German wamba, 'stomach' (cognate to womb).

The term aketon, originally the medieval French alcottonem, might be a loan from Arabic al-qutn, meaning 'cotton' (definite article – "the cotton").

In medieval Norse, the garment was known as vápntreyja, literally 'weapon shirt', or panzari/panzer. Treyja is a loan from (Middle) Low German. Panzari/panzer is probably also a loan from Middle Low German, though the word has its likely origin in Italian, and is related to the Latin pantex, meaning 'abdomen', cognate with English paunch.

== History ==
Open, quilted leather jackets and trousers were worn by Scythian horsemen before the 4th century BC, as can be seen on Scythian gold ornaments crafted by Greek goldsmiths. As stand-alone cloth armour, the European gambeson can be traced at least to the late tenth century, but it is likely to have been used in various forms for longer. In the Middle Ages, its use became widespread in the thirteenth century and resembled a tunic. Eventually, it made way for the pourpoint (jack or paltock) in the 14th century and had supplanted the gambeson in Henry III's Assize of Arms (1242).

The gambeson was used both as a complete armour unto itself and underneath mail and plate to cushion the body and prevent chafing. Evidence for its use under armour does not appear in iconography until the mid-twelfth century.

Although they are thought to have been used in Europe much earlier, gambesons underwent a revolution from their first proven use (in the late eleventh and early twelfth centuries) as an independent item of armour to one that facilitated the wearing of mail. They remained popular amongst infantry as cloth armour. Although quilted armour survived into the English Civil War in England as a "poor man's cuirass" and as an item to be worn beneath the few remaining suits of full plate, it was increasingly replaced by the buff coat—a leather jacket of rough suede.

There are two distinctive designs of gambeson: those designed to be worn beneath armour, and those designed to be worn as independent armour. The latter tend to be thicker and higher in the collar and faced with other materials, such as leather or heavy canvas. This variant is usually referred to as "padded jack" and made of several (some say around 18, some even 30) layers of cotton, linen or wool. These jacks were known to stop even heavy arrows, and their design of multiple layers bears a striking resemblance to modern-day body armour, which used at first silk, then ballistic nylon, and later, Kevlar as its fabric.

For common soldiers who could not afford mail or plate armour, the gambeson, combined with a helmet as the only additional protection, remained a common sight on European battlefields during the entire Middle Ages. Its decline—paralleling that of plate armour—came only with the Renaissance, as the use of firearms became more widespread. By the eighteenth century, it was no longer in military use.

While the use of linen in these jackets has been proven by archaeological evidence, the use of cotton—and cotton-based canvas—is disputed since large amounts of cotton cloth were not widely available in Northern Europe. It is probable that Egypt (and Asia Minor generally) still produced cotton well after the 7th and 8th centuries, and knowledge (and samples) of this cloth was brought to Europe by the returning Crusaders; however, the logistics and expense of equipping a town militia or army with large numbers of cotton-based garments make its usage doubtful when flax-based textiles (linen) were in widespread use.

Linothorax was a type of armour similar to gambeson, used by ancient Greeks. Meanwhile, the Mesoamericans were known to have used a kind of quilted textile armour called ichcahuipilli before the arrival of the conquistadors, who loaned this word as Spanish: escaupil. Another example is the bullet-resistant Myeonje baegab created during Joseon Korea to confront the effects of Western rifles.

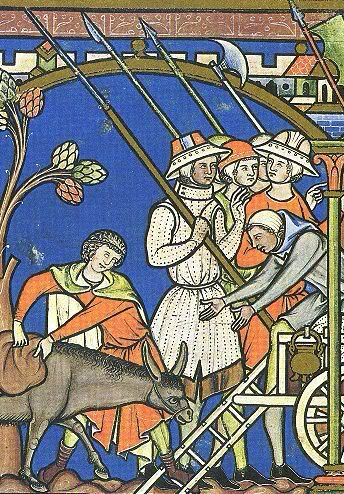
13th-century gambeson worn by a soldier in the Morgan Bible

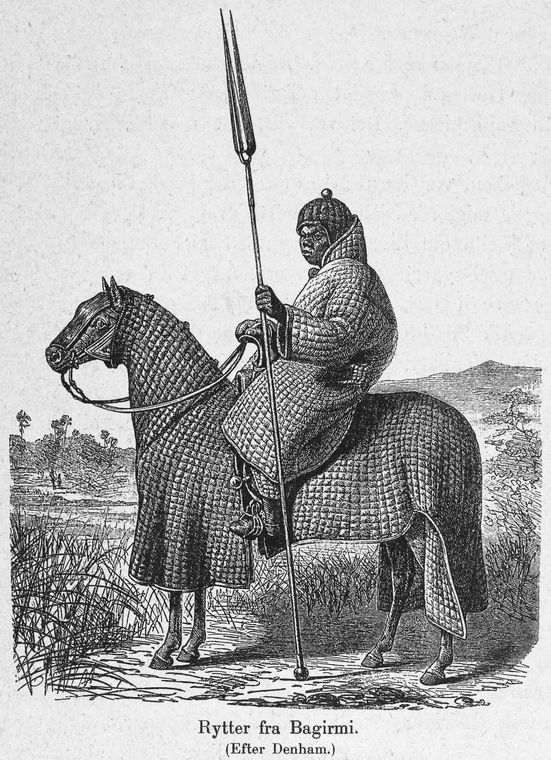
Sultanate of Bagirmi horseman in full padded armour suit, 1901

== See also ==
- Buff coat
- Doublet
- Ichcahuipilli
- Jack of plate
- Pourpoint
