= Peascod belly =

Padded belly fashionable for men in the 16th century

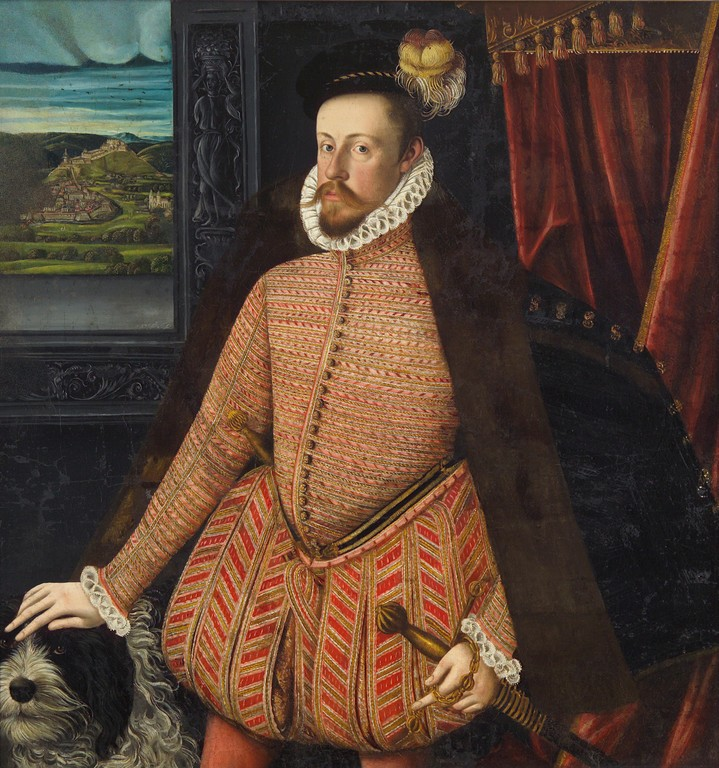
Charles II, Archduke of Austria, wearing a peascod-bellied doublet in 1569

A peascod belly is a type of exaggeratedly padded stomach that was very popular in men's dress in the mid-16th and early 17th centuries. The term has been said to have come from "peacock," though more likely it comes from the resemblance of the stomach shape in profile to a peapod, as "peascod" is an archaic form of the word. Contemporary plate armour copies this fashionable silhouette, which was sometimes called a "goose belly".

In the late 16th century the stomach of the doublet was padded to stick out, however, by 1625, the padding had become more evenly distributed over the chest area.

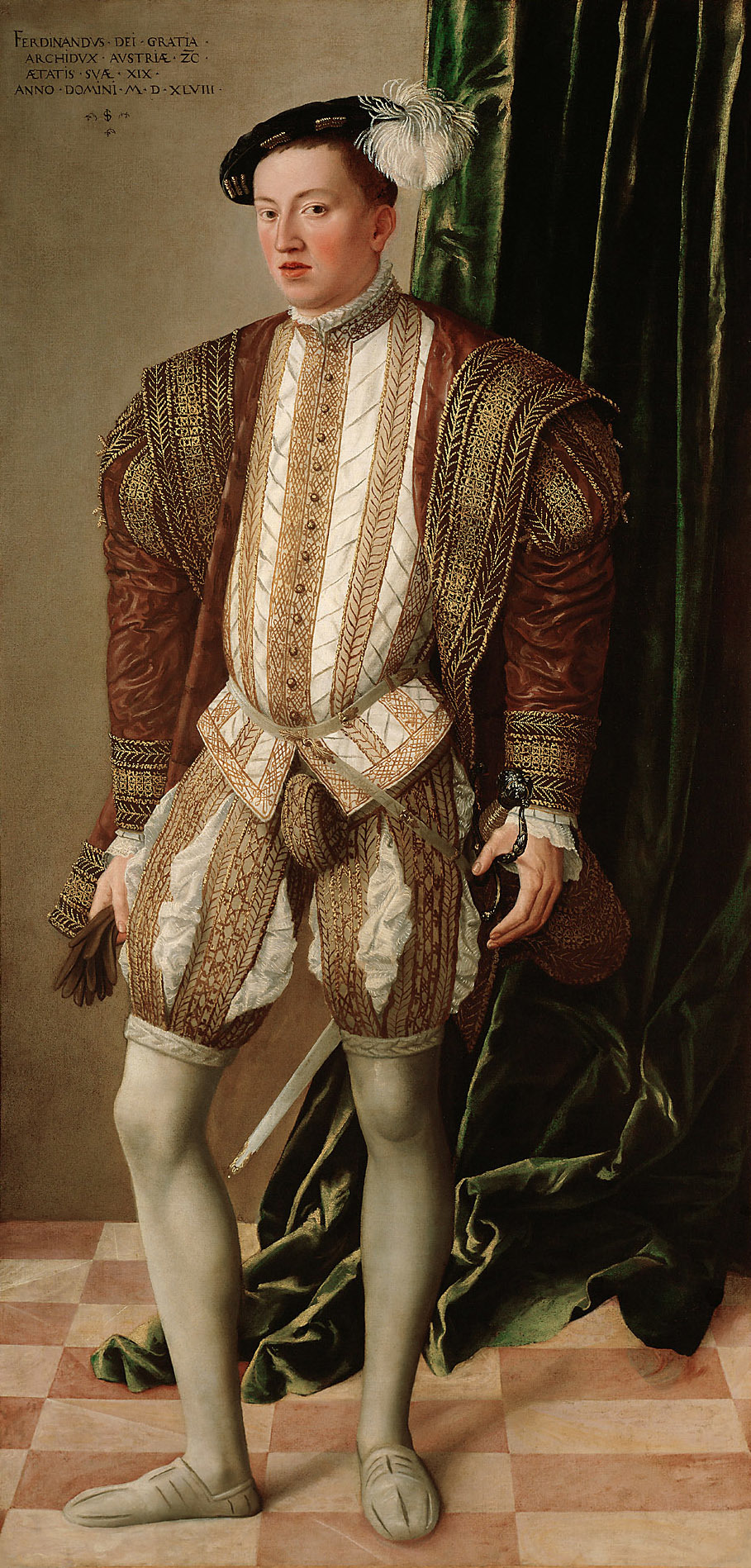
Archduke Ferdinand of Tyrol, 1542, by Jakob Seisenegger

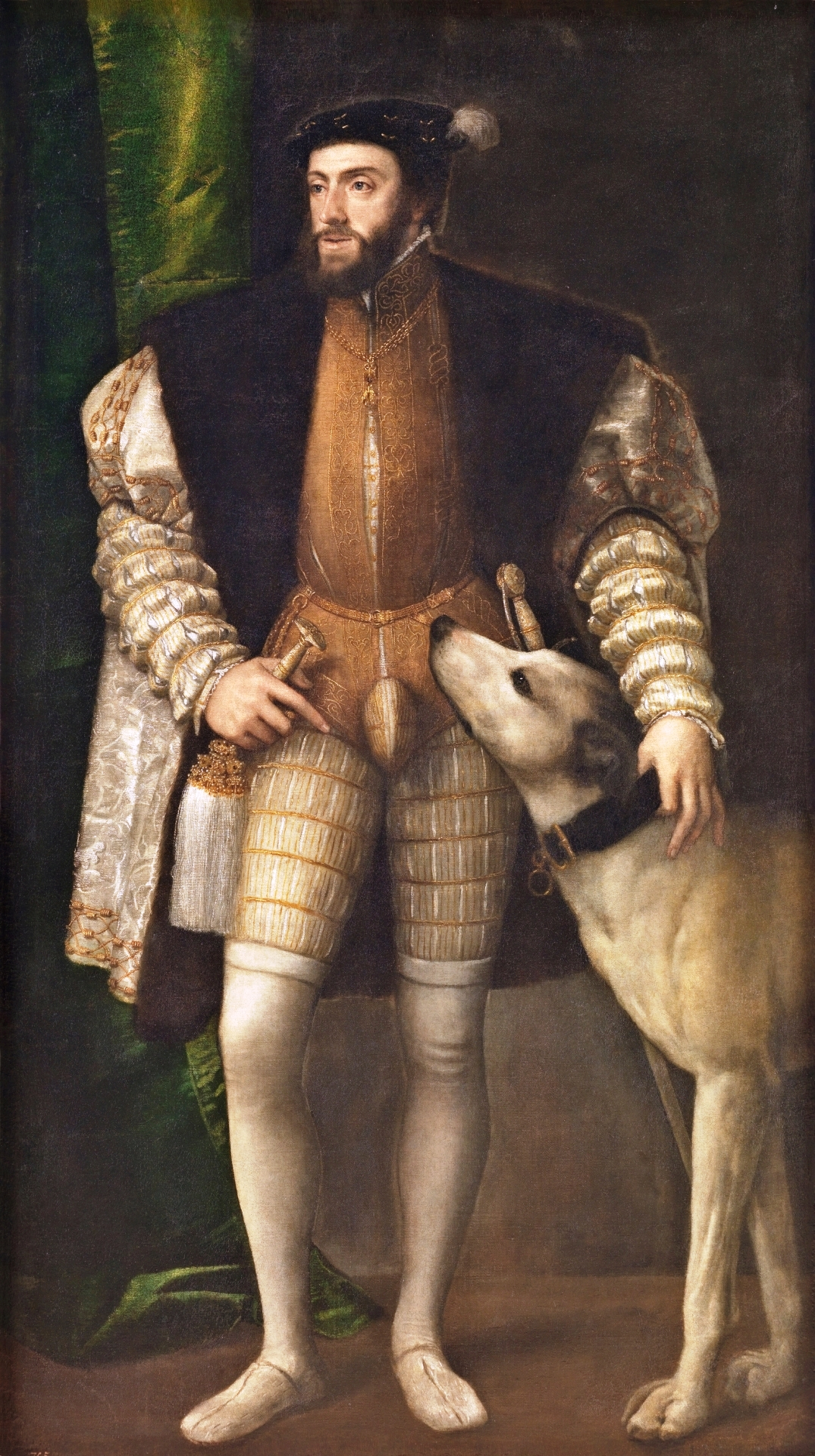
Charles V Standing with His Dog, by Titian
