= Pourpoint =

Late medieval piece of clothing

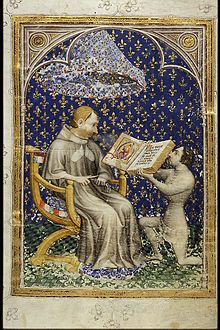
Man on the right wearing a pourpoint, The Hague MMW, 10 B 23.jpg

The pourpoint (formerly called jack or paltock) was a garment worn by noblemen of the late 14th century in civilian or military situations. It is not to be confused with the jupon or the umbrella term "gambeson". This garment is known for its wasp waisted and round silhouette which was achieved thanks to its sewing pattern, its quilting and its "grande assiette" style sleeves.

== Etymology ==
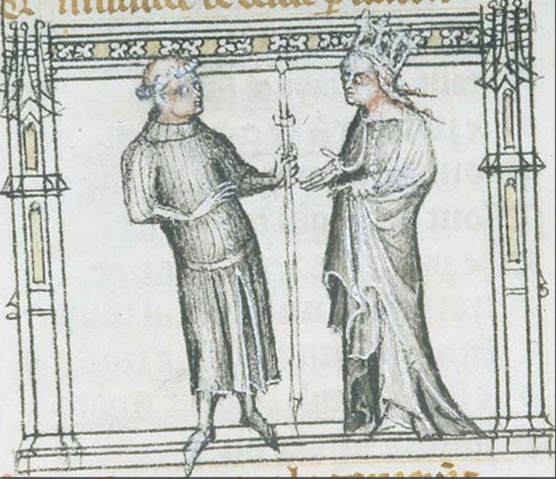
mid 14th century gambeson

Pourpoint is a loan from the French word "pourpoint" which came from the Middle French noun "Pourpoint"(the quilted garment) from the Middle French "pourpoindre" (meaning to quilt or to embroider) which came from the Latin "perpunctus".

The word pourpoint existed as early as the late 12th century. In fact, it was originally a synonym for the terms gambeson and aketon in both England (it supplanted the gambeson in Henry III's Assize of Arms (1242) and France (as described in the 14th century "pélérinage de la vie humaine"). But in the late 14th century, it turned into the Pidgeon breasted garment we know today. At this time, they were commonly referred to as jacks or paltocks.

== History ==
The pourpoint marked a major shift in western European fashion as it led to people moving away from the boxy silhouettes of ancient and earlier medieval clothes into the elaborate garb of the Late Medieval period and the Modern era. It was invented as a military garment which cut into the waist in order to prepare the body for the breastplate that sat between the ribs and the pelvis. Thus, shifting its weight from the shoulders to the hips.

Instead of wearing the armor's weight on the shoulders, late medieval knights opted to distribute their harness' weight throughout the body. Eventually, this garment started being worn by noble men in their day-to-day lives as outer garments (over the undertunic) replacing the tunic.

As soon as the 15th century, manuscripts depict people wearing doublets instead.

The word was also used for a women's garment in the 16th century. An inventory of the wardrobe of Mary, Queen of Scots at Chartley Castle in 1586, written in French, lists fifteen "pourpoincts" of satin, taffeta, and canvas. These were described as doublets in later lists.

== Design ==
=== Pattern ===
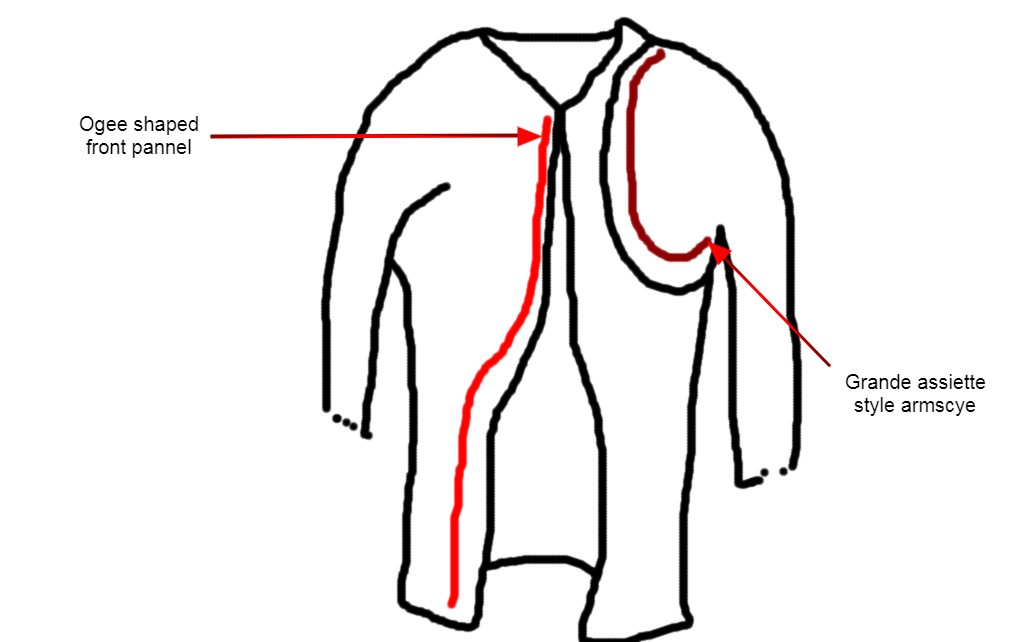
Diagram of a pourpoint

The pourpoint featured many sewing techniques unseen in 21st century clothes. These include the ogee shaped front panels which make the torso rounder by forcing the belly inwards, an armscye big enough to cover part of the ribs and chest (grande assiette style) and curved sleeves designed to allow mobility despite the light padding and tight fitting woven fabric.

=== Fabric ===
Many fabrics have been used for the pourpoint but the main ones are wool, fustian silk Lampas and silk satin/canvas of Reims as outer fabrics. The same fabrics were used as lining but soft wool fabrics were commonly used even by the nobility. As for interlining, wool fabrics such as blanchet and carisé were used. Blanchet was an umbrella term for white canvas of varying qualities and prices, while carisé was a twill rudimentary wool fabric imported from England to France and the duchy of Burgundy. Otherwise, strong linen or cotton was used.

Doublets made of silk fabric were worn in the battlefield.

== Illustration gallery ==
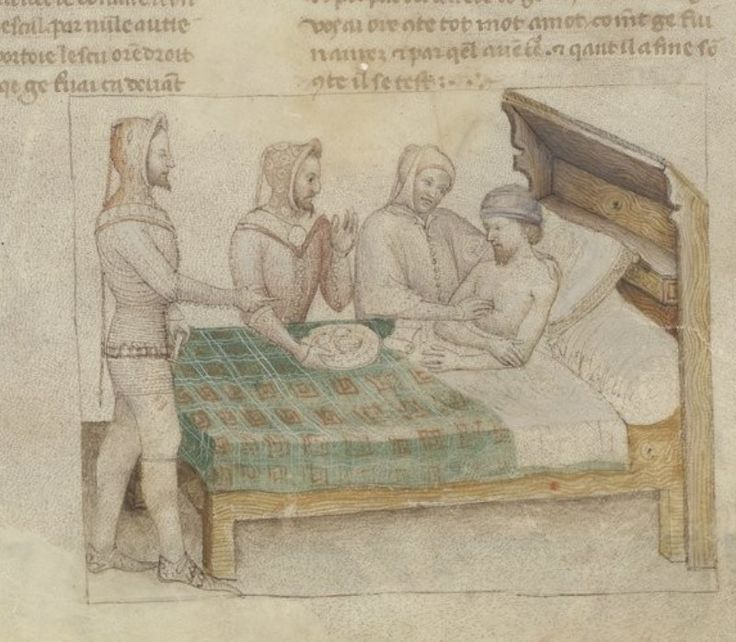
Milanese miniature depicting a pourpoint

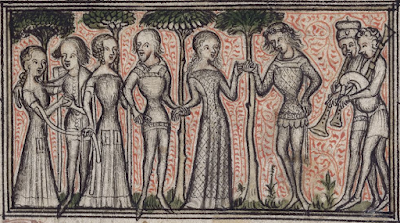
Dancing nobles wearing garments over pourpoint
