= Hose (clothing) =

Historical men's clothing for the legs and lower body

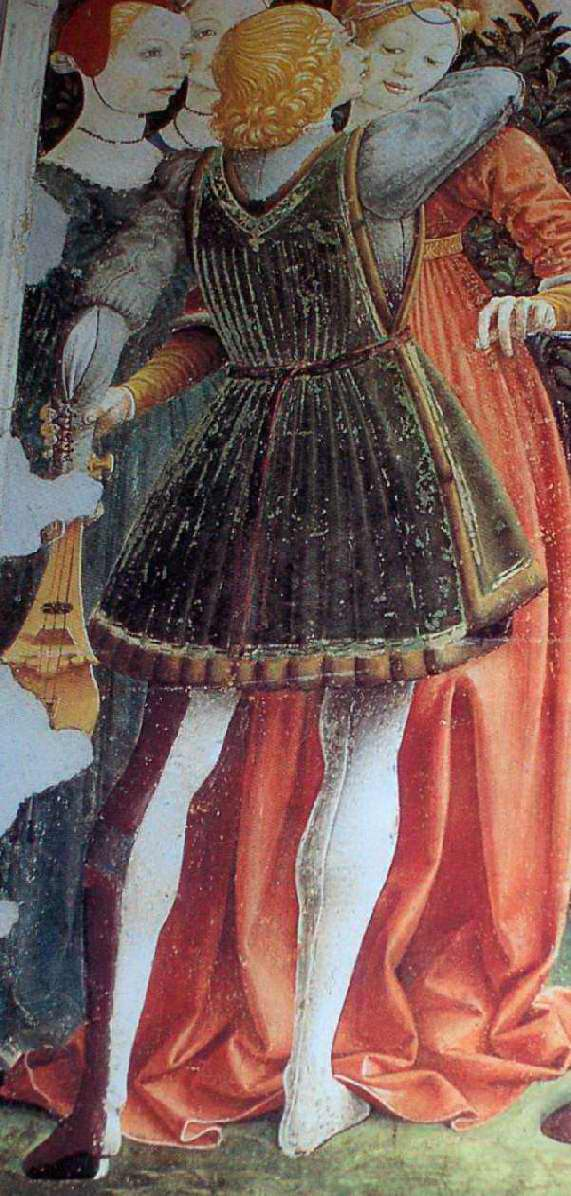
Florentine particolored hose, c. 1470

Hose are any of various styles of men's clothing for the legs and lower body, worn from the Middle Ages through to the 17th century, when the style fell out of use in favour of breeches and stockings. The old plural form of "hose" was "hosen". In German these terms (Hose, singular, and Hosen, plural) remained in use and are the generic terms for trousers today. The French equivalent was chausses.

== History ==
Since the 13th century, hose were already known to have been worn in Europe; these were tights that stretch from waist to feet. The outline of the legs were conspicuously shown, with the groin area sometimes covered by a material called a codpiece. Unlike modern tights, these hose were not elastic; they were laced to the doublet to keep them taut.

During the 14th century, medieval hosen were made of wool and were made to fit tightly. Towards the end of the century traders and shopkeepers wore coloured hose. Some people did away with wearing shoes and instead wore hose that had leather soles sewn under the foot section, this part of the hose being the same colour as the rest of the leggings. Brighter hosen seem to be more prominent by the late 14th century, and seem to more resemble trousers that was held up with rope-belts at the waist; hose were sometimes tied directly to the doublet.

15th century hose were often made particolored or mi-parti, each leg having a different colour, or even one leg made of two colors. These early hosen were footed, in the manner of modern tights, and were open from the crotch to the leg. When very short doublets were in fashion, codpieces were added to cover the front opening.

By the 16th century, hose had separated into two garments: upper hose or breeches and nether hose or stockings. When hunting in the Scottish Highlands, James V wore "heland tartane" hose. In February 1591, a pair of long black silk hose was made for James VI to wear with a masque costume of black taffeta.

From the mid-16th to early 17th centuries, a variety of styles of hose were in fashion. Popular styles included:

- Trunk hose or round hose, short padded hose. Very short trunk hose were worn over cannions, fitted hose that ended above the knee.
- Slops or galligaskins, loose hose reaching just below the knee.

Trunk hose and slops could be paned or pansied, with strips of fabric (panes) over a full inner layer or lining. A pansied slop is a round hose characterized by the addition of a layer of panes, or strips of fabric running from the waistband to the leg band. These are commonly referred to as "pumpkin" pants.

Other varieties included:

- Pluderhosen, a Northern European form of pansied slops with a very full inner layer pulled out between the panes and hanging below the knee. Originating in Germany, Pluderhosen soon spread to central and Eastern Europe.
- Venetians, semi-fitted hose reaching just below the knee.

In the latter 16th century, breeches began to replace hoses. Unlike breeches, which were sewn together, the hose were in principle separate garments for each leg.

== Gallery ==
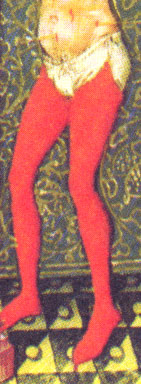
Hose or chausses worn with braies and tied to a belt, 1440

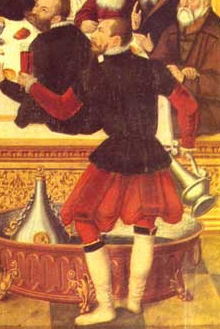
Servant wearing pluderhosen, 1565

Charles IX of France wearing padded hose, 1566

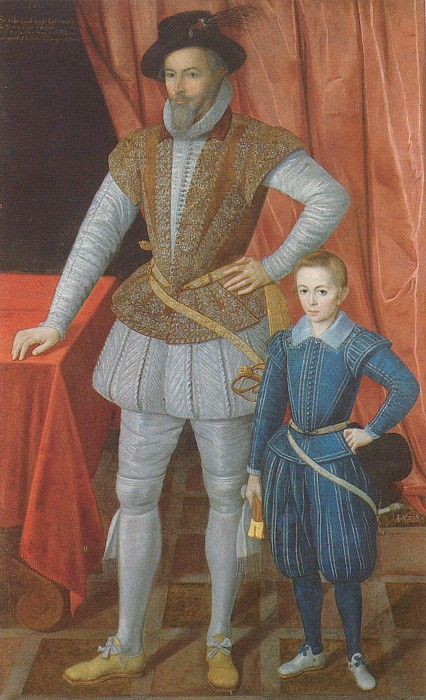
Sir Walter Raleigh in paned trunk hose and cannions, and his son in loose slops, 1602

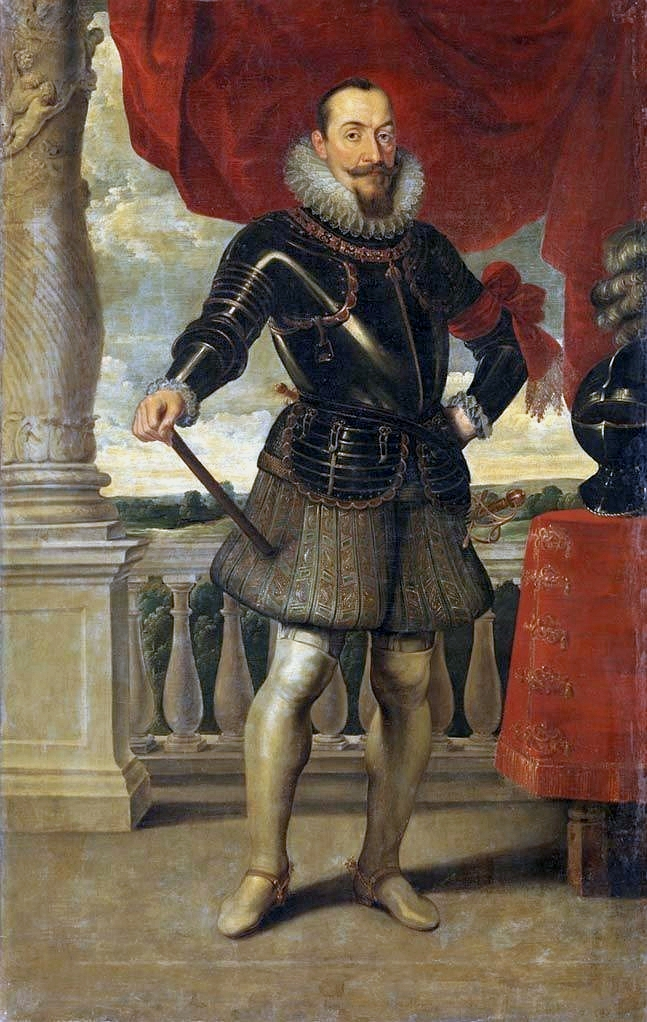
Sigismund III of Poland in Spanish-style hose, while one of the popular type of hose in Spain around that time were Polish-style hose, c. 1620

== See also ==
- 1500–1550 in fashion
- 1550–1600 in fashion
