= Doublet (clothing) =

15th- to 17th-century men's garment

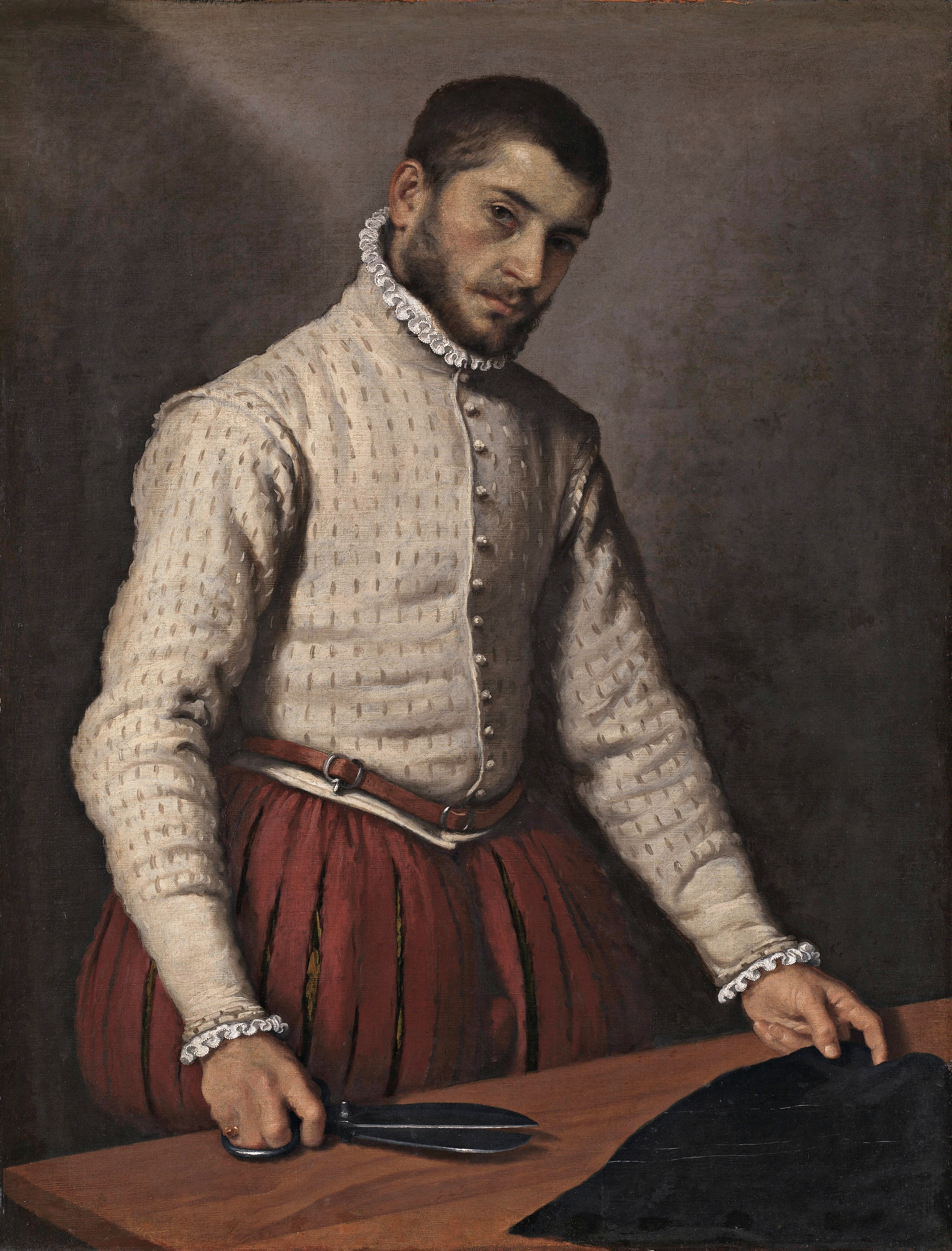
The unidentified tailor in Giovanni Battista Moroni's famous portrait of c. 1570 is in doublet and lined and stuffed ("bombasted") hose.

A doublet (/ˈdʌblɪt/; derived from Italian: giubbetta) is a kind of snug-fitting jacket that is shaped and fitted to a man's body. Until the end of the 15th century, the doublet was most often worn under another layer of clothing such as a gown, mantle, or houppelande when in public. In the 16th century, it was covered by the jerkin which often matched. Women started wearing doublets in the 16th century. The doublet could be thigh length, hip length or waist length depending on the period, and worn over the shirt with matching or contrasting "hose", the term for the tight leggings and later breeches-like lower garment which were attached by lacing to the doublet with "points", the cord or ribbon laces.

Like the pourpoint, its ancestor, the doublet was used by soldiers in the 15th and 16th centuries to facilitate the wearing of the brigandine, breastplate, cuirass, and plackart, which had to cut into the waist in order to shift their weights from the shoulders to the hips. However, it differs from the pourpoint by being shut with lacing instead of being closed with buttons and having a different shape and cut.

In the 16th century, it might have featured a stomacher at the front. By the 1520s, the edges of the doublet more frequently met at the center front. Then, like many other originally practical items in the history of men's wear, from the late 15th century onward it became elaborate enough to be seen on its own.

Throughout the 250 years of its use, the doublet served the same purposes: to give the fashionable shape of the time, to add padding to the body under armour in war, to support the hose by providing ties, and to provide warmth to the body. The only things that changed about the doublet over its history were its style and cut.

== History ==
The doublet developed from the 14th century padded garment worn under armour called the pourpoint, similar to the aketon.

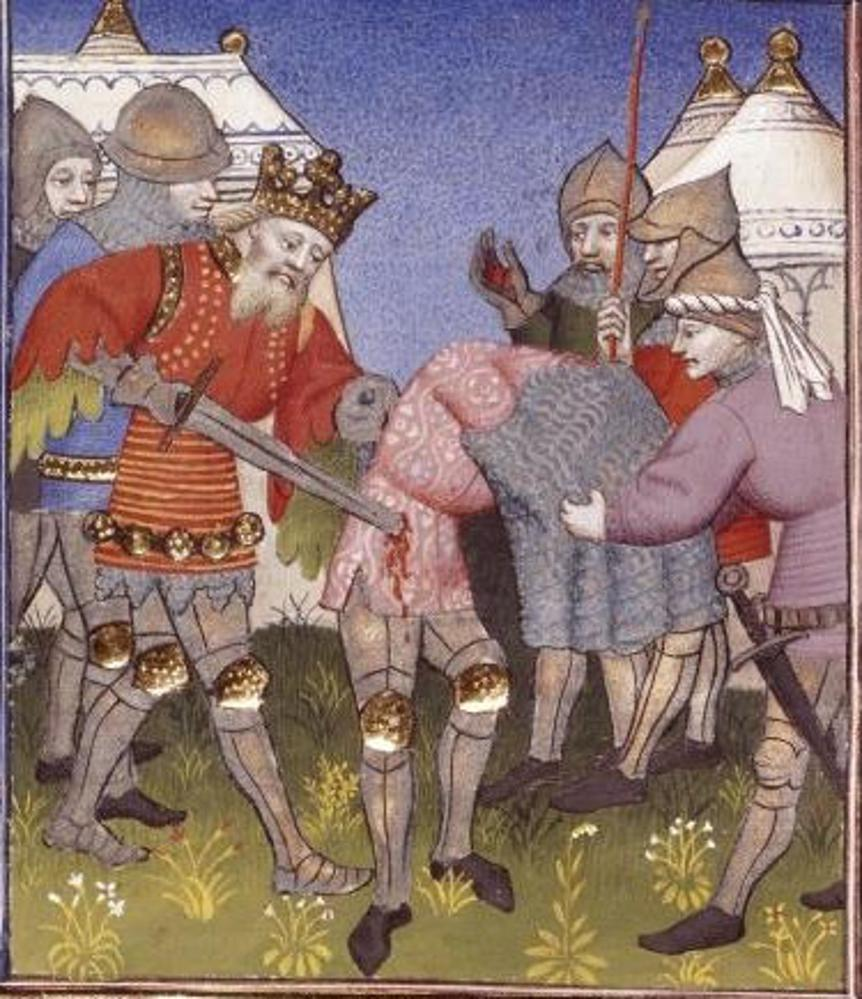
Doublet c.1412, worn underneath chain mail

Despite keeping the same silhouette as the pourpoint, early 15th century doublets feature some noticeable differences like puffed sleeves and lack of quilting. Later in the 15th century, the doublet changed shape over time with each country developing its own style.

Satin doublets with stomachers or "placards" were worn by footmen and henchmen at the coronation of Henry VII of England in October 1485. Through the Tudor period, fashionable doublets were close-fitting with baggy sleeves, and elaborate surface decoration such as pinks (patterns of small cuts in the fabric), slashes, embroidery, and applied braid. A man's doublet was worn above a shirt, and it was sometimes sleeveless or had tight or detachable sleeves. It was either made of wool or a kersey, which was a rough canvas material that would be mixed with wool. Until 1540, doublets had laces that would allow the hose to be tied to it.

=== 16th century ===
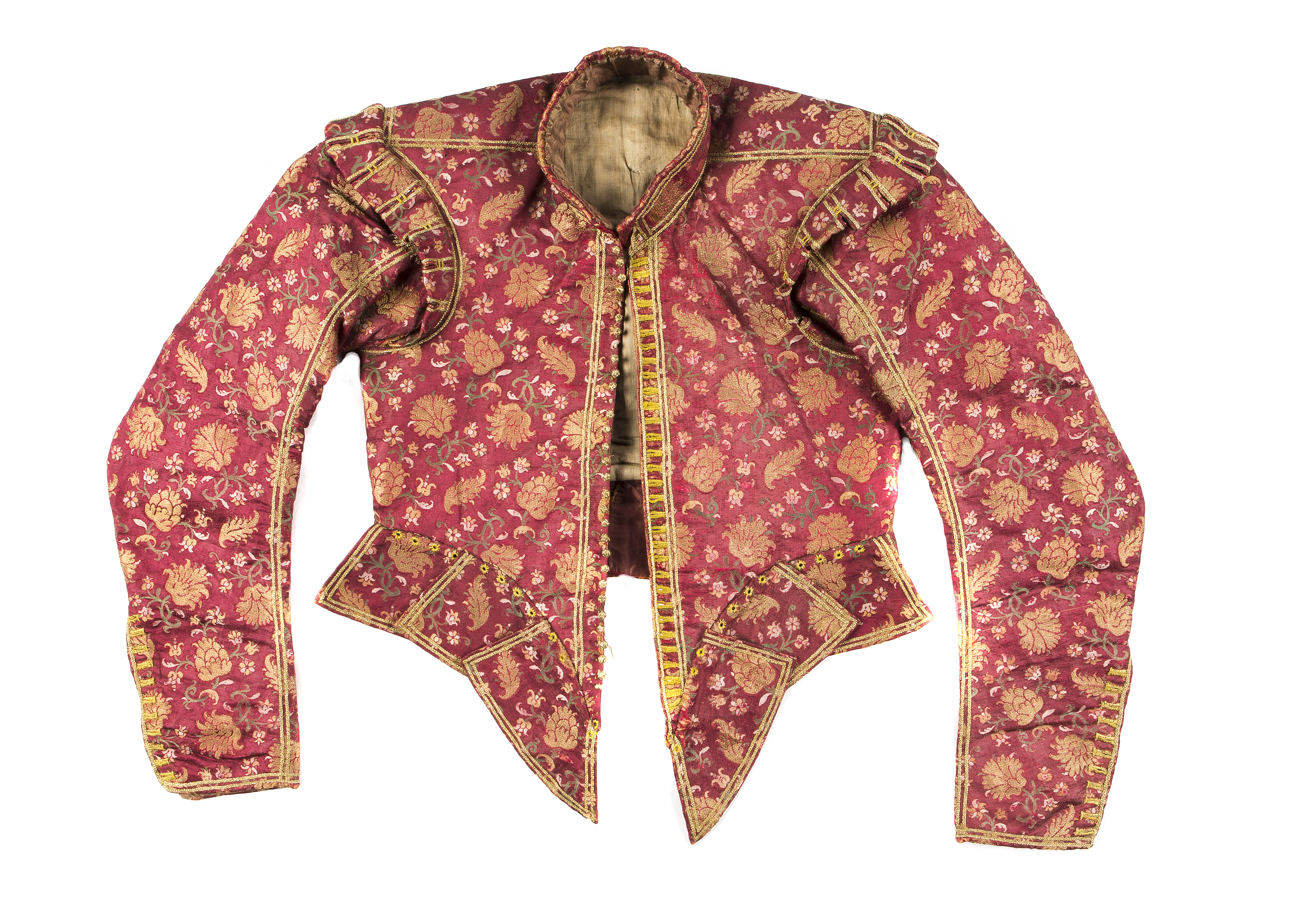
Doublet, c. 1610

In England in the beginning of the Renaissance, a high-quality doublet would have lasted for at least two years, however there are many reports of doublets disintegrating after only four months. Items of costume were suitable for New Year's Day gifts amongst the aristocracy. In 1574, Gilbert Talbot gave his father, the Earl of Shrewsbury, a perfumed doublet.

In 1536, the embroiderer William Ibgrave fashioned the initials of Jane Seymour with pearls and emeralds to decorate a doublet for Henry VIII. He was paid for pinking and cutting the doublets of Edward VI in 1553. In the early Elizabethan period, doublets for men were padded over the belly with bombast in a "pouter pigeon" or "peascod" silhouette. Sleeve attachments at the shoulder were disguised by decorative wings, tabs, or piccadills, and short skirt-like peplums or piccadills covered the waist of the hose or breeches. Padding gradually fell out of fashion again, and the doublet became close-fitting with a deep V-waistline.

Elizabeth I's tailor, Walter Fyshe, first made her a doublet in 1575, of yellow satin decorated with silver lace. Elizabethan writers like Philip Stubbes criticised the fashion, as doublets were "a kind of attire appropriate only to man". A different style of upper garment fashionable for women from the 1580s, first known as "a pair of square bodies" from the style of the neckline, came to be called a doublet, although the garment did not fasten with buttons at the front.

In November 1590, an African servant at the Scottish court was given a doublet of shot or "changing" Spanish taffeta with 48 buttons, with breeches of orange velvet, and a hat of yellow taffeta. As a New Year Day's gift to Elizabeth I in January 1600, Elizabeth Brydges, a maid of honour, presented a doublet of network lawn, cut and tufted up with white knit-work, flourished with silver.

=== 17th century ===
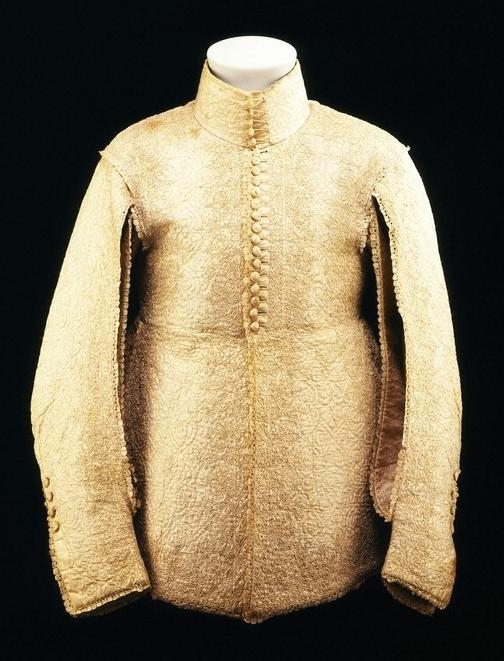
Doublet, 1635–1640 V&A Museum no. 177-1900

By the 17th century, doublets were short-waisted. A typical sleeve of this period was full and slashed to show the shirt beneath; a later style was full and paned or slashed to just below the elbow and snug below. Decorative ribbon points were pulled through eyelets on the breeches and the waist of the doublet to keep the breeches in place, and were tied in elaborate bows.

James Hay, 1st Earl of Carlisle wrote about the tight-fitting costumes worn by performers in English court masques, the fashion was "to appear very small in the waist, I remember was drawn up from the ground by both hands whilst the tailor with all his strength buttoned on my doublet".

The doublet fell permanently out of fashion in the mid-17th century when Louis XIV of France and Charles II of England established a court costume for men consisting of a long coat, a waistcoat, a cravat, a wig, and breeches—the ancestor of the modern suit.

== Gallery ==
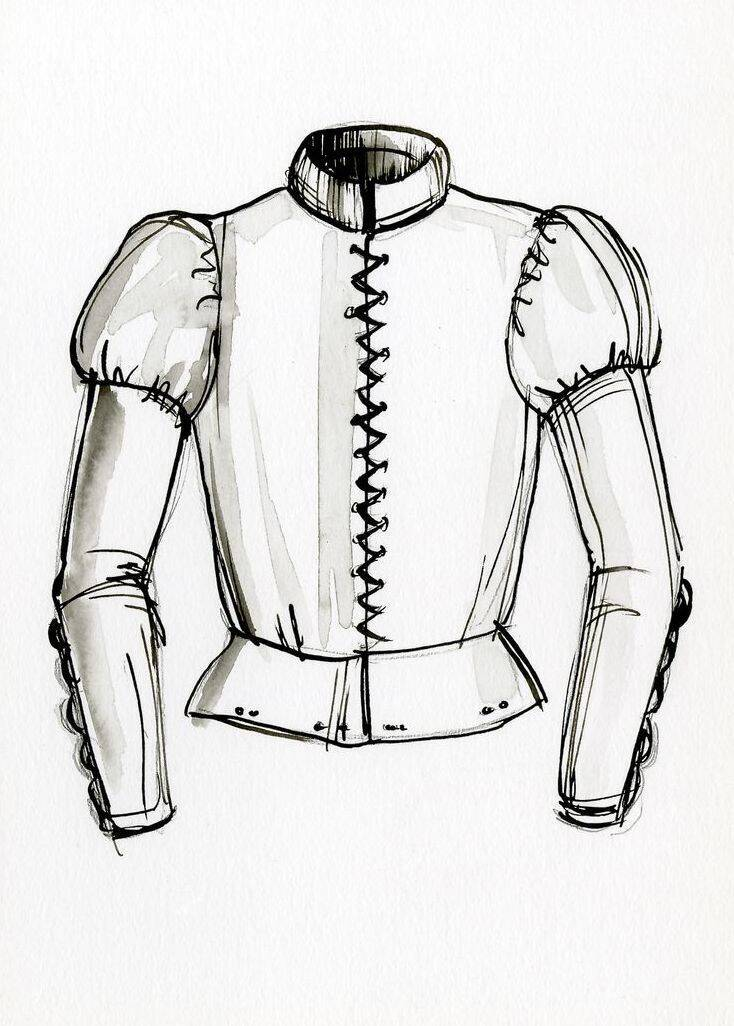
Sketch of a doublet

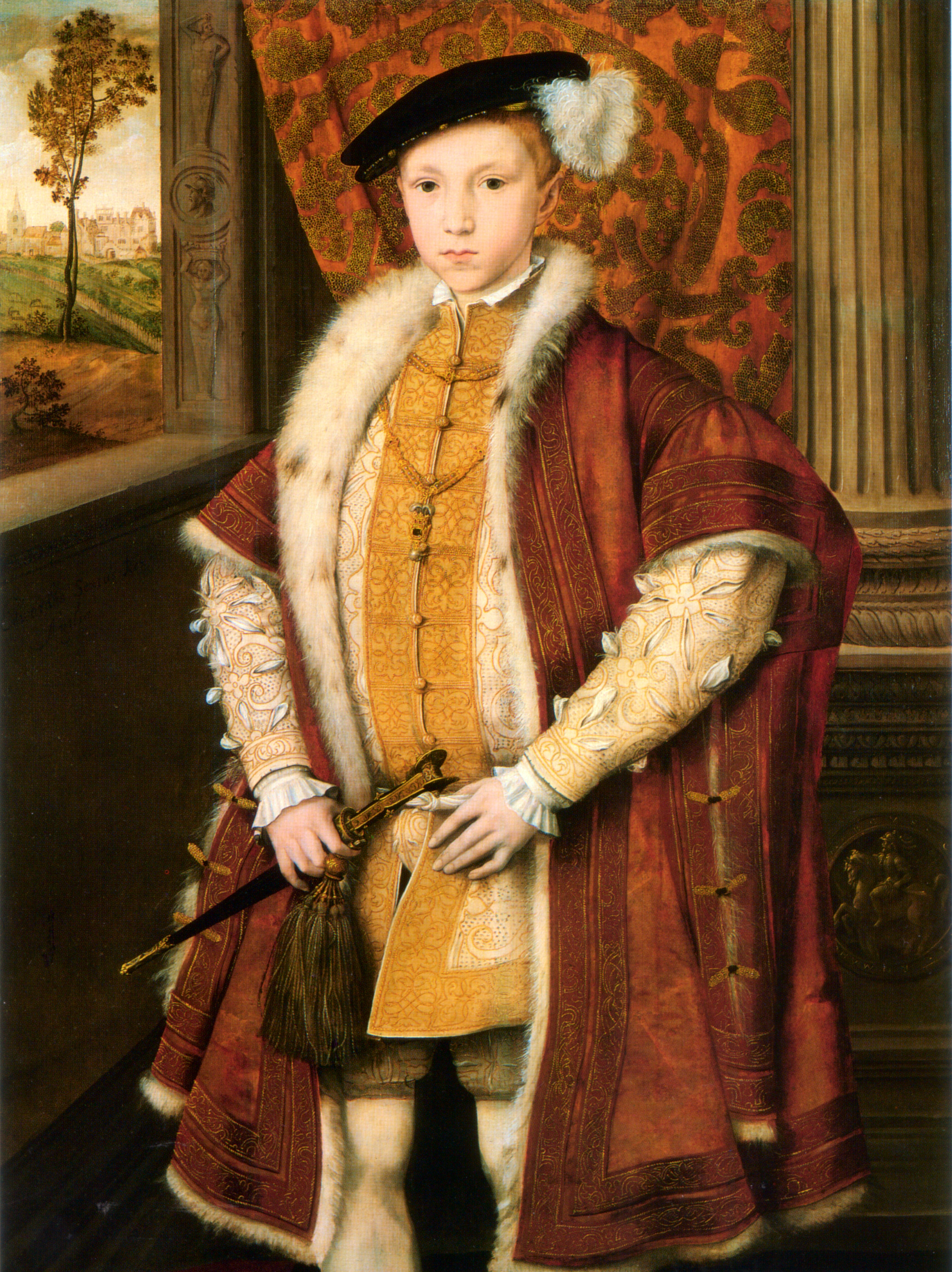
Edward VI in a long-skirted late Tudor doublet under a crimson gown with hanging sleeves

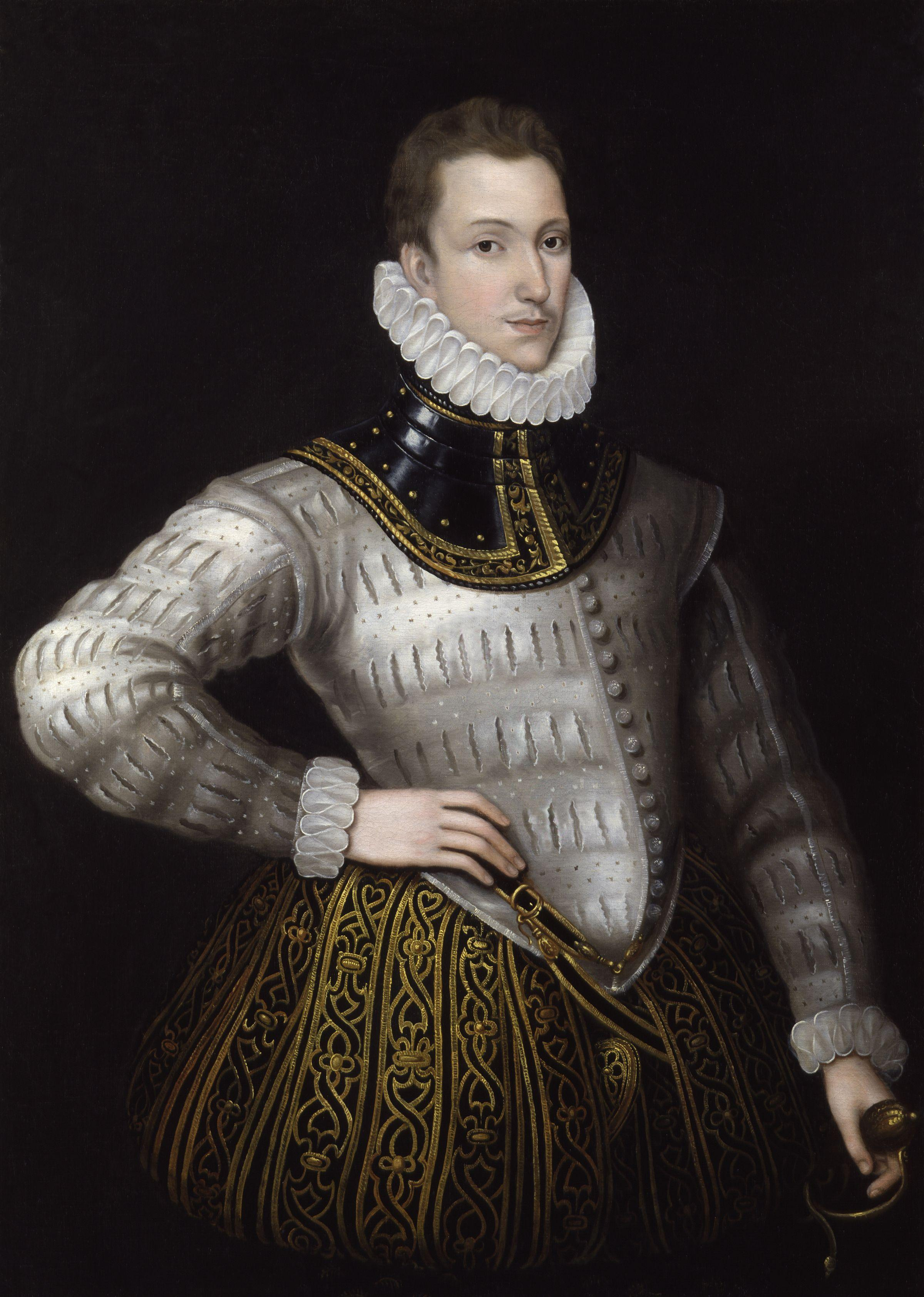
Philip Sidney, English poet and diplomat, wearing a doublet

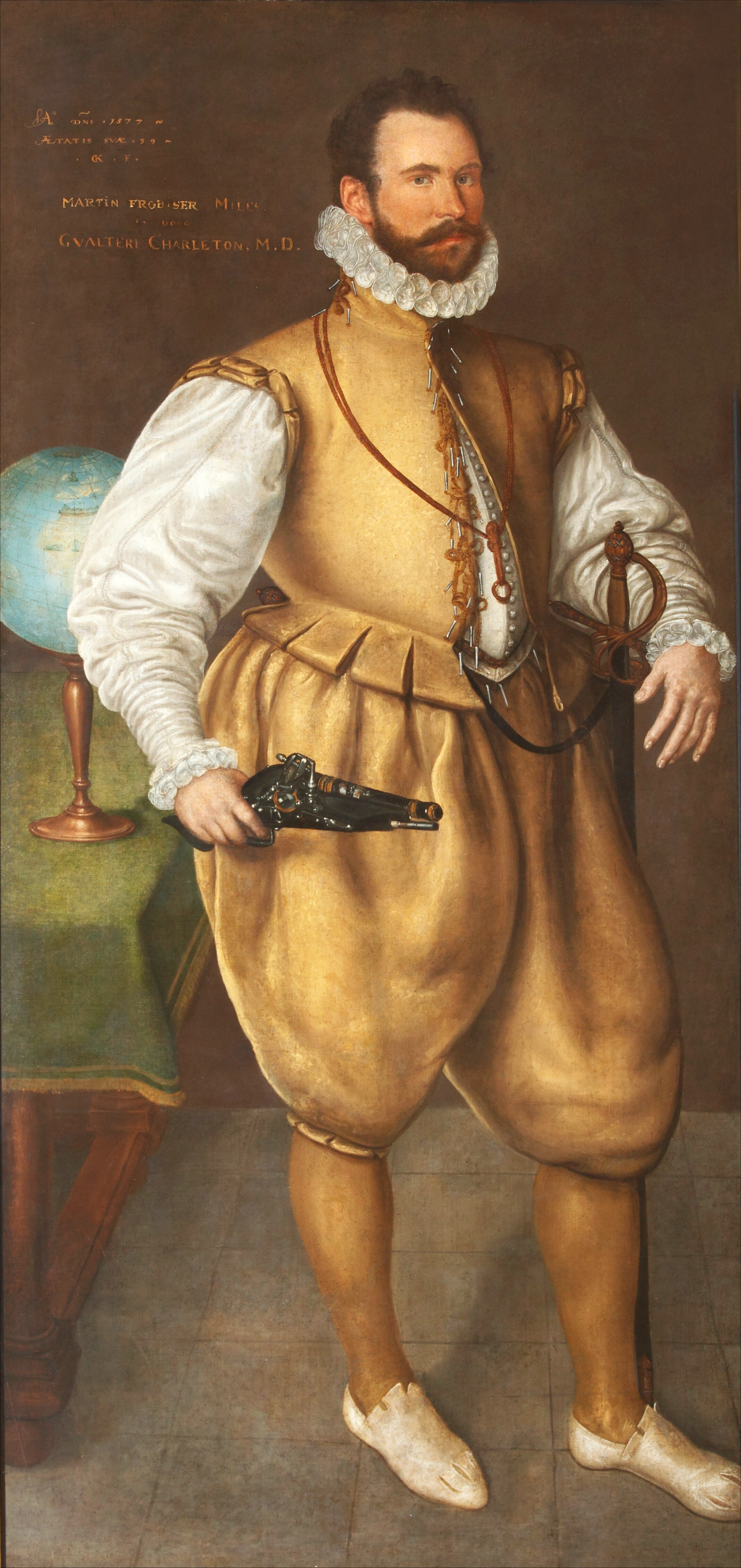
Martin Frobisher in a peascod-bellied doublet under a buff jerkin

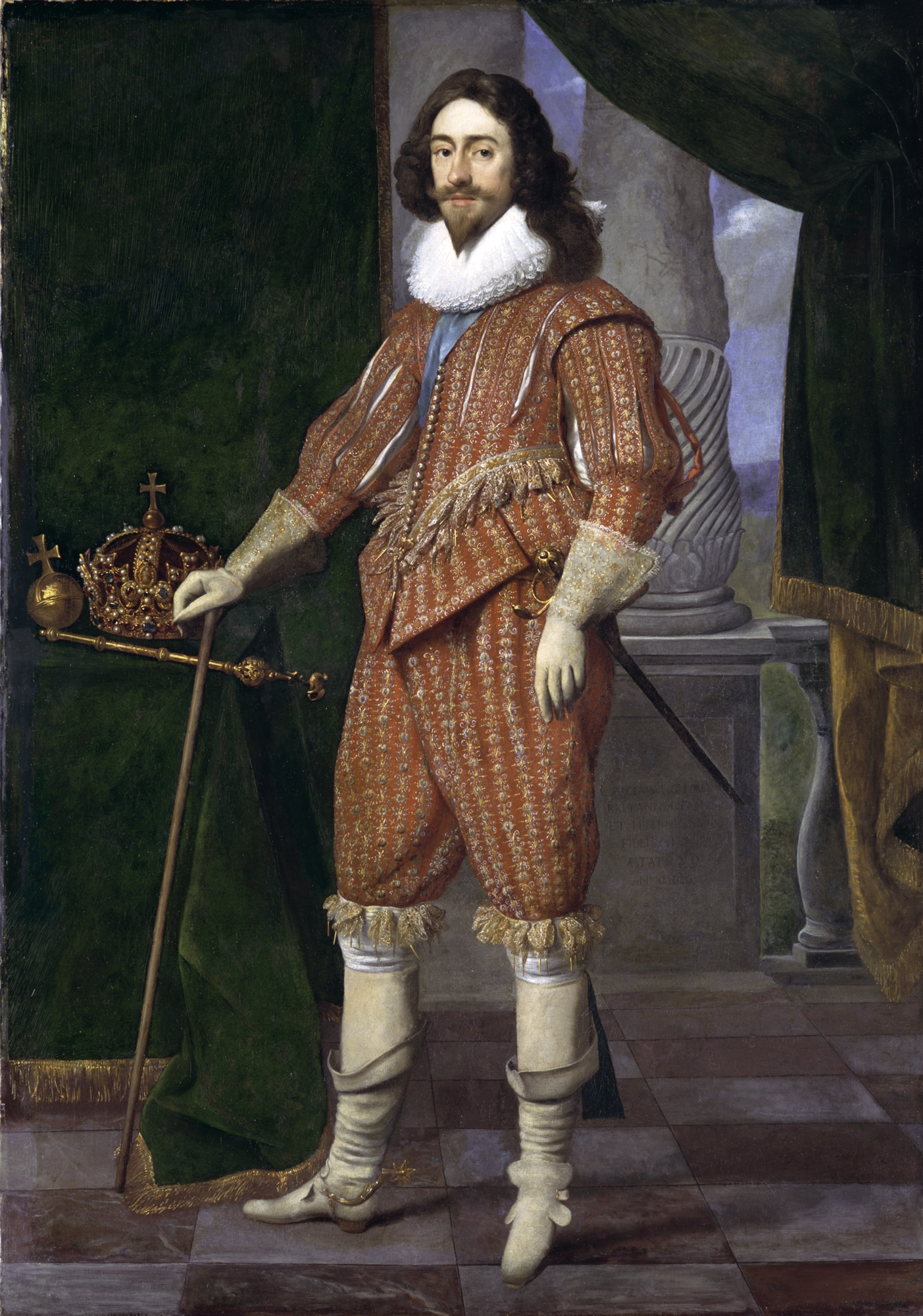
Charles I in a points-fastened doublet and breeches. 1629, by Daniel Mijtens the Elder

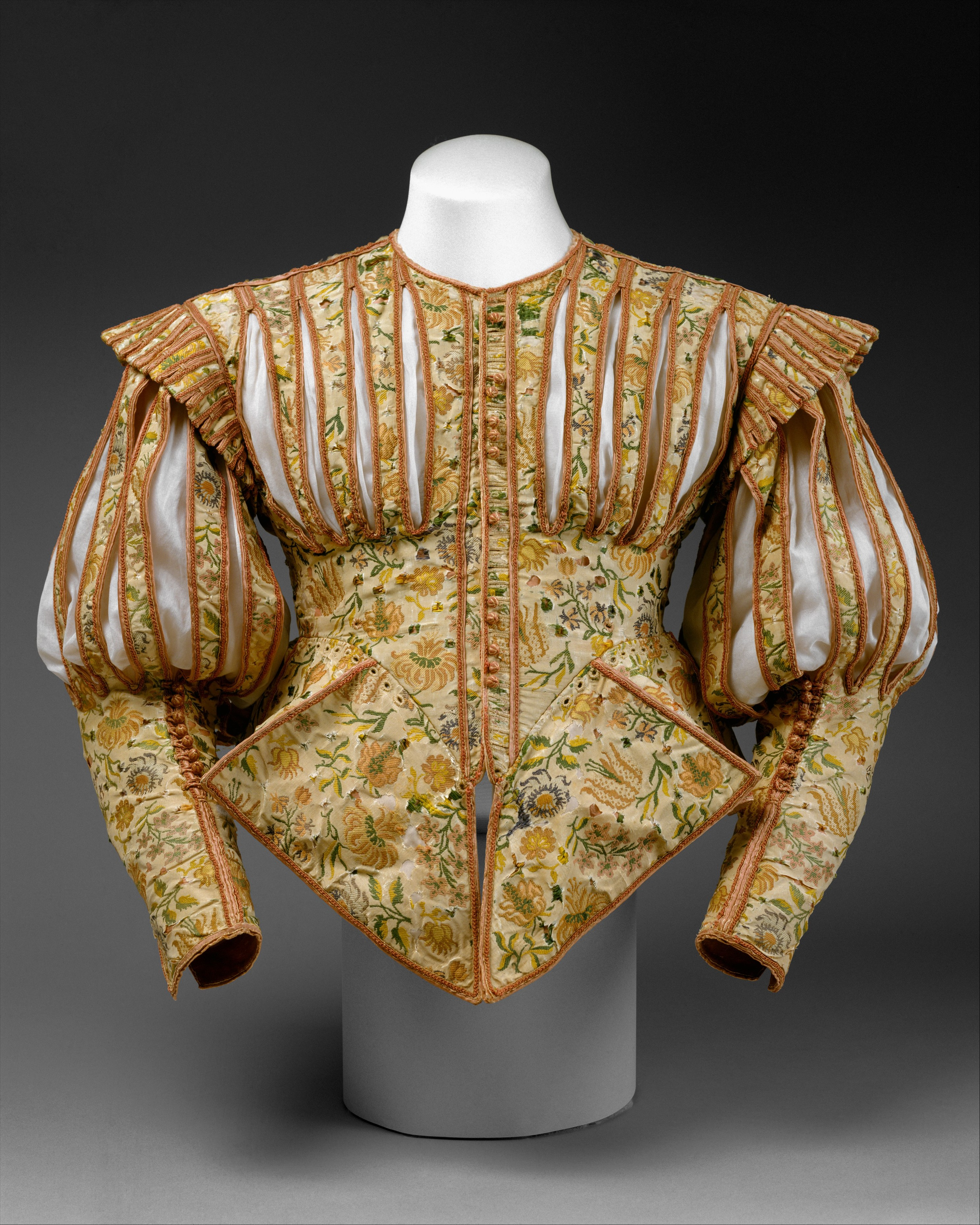
Doublet, c. 1620, Metropolitan Museum of Art

== See also ==
- 1500–1550 in fashion
- 1550–1600 in fashion
- 1600–1650 in fashion
- 1650-1700 in fashion
- Brigandine

== Bibliography ==
- Arnold, Janet (1986 rev ed.) [1985]. Patterns of Fashion: The Cut and Construction of Clothes for Men and Women 1560–1620. Revised edition. London: MacMillan Publishers. ISBN 0-89676-083-9.
