= Tibetan armor =

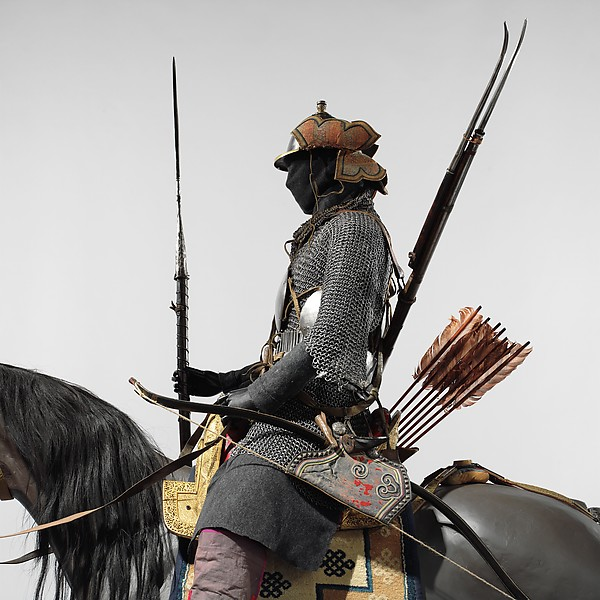
18th century Tibetan cavalryman and horse armor on display at the Metropolitan Museum of Art.

Tibetan culture has a long history of producing armor for military and ceremonial use. Tibetan armor came in many forms, and was produced into the 20th century due to the isolation of the Tibetan Plateau.

== History ==
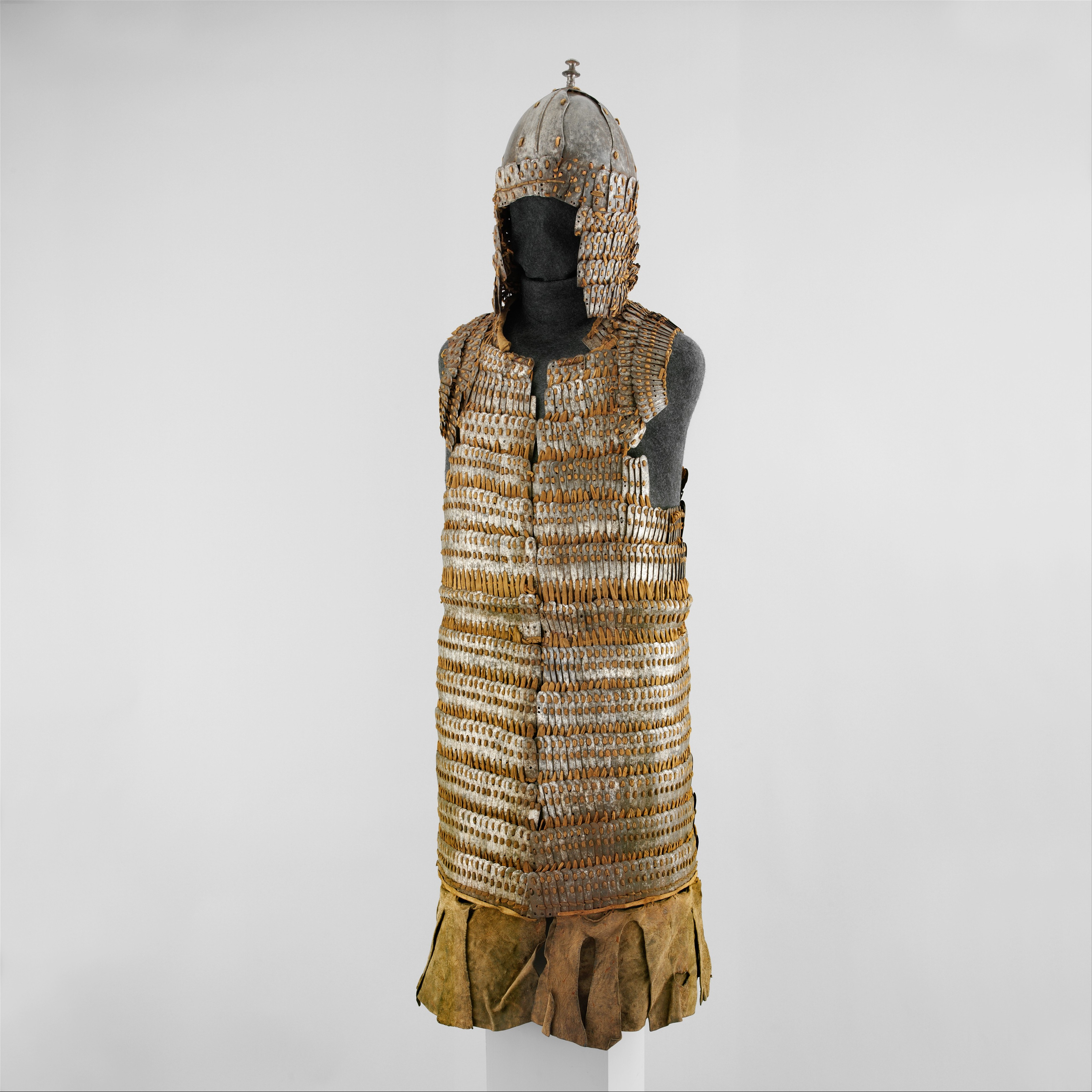
Tibetan lamellar armour, 16th-17th century

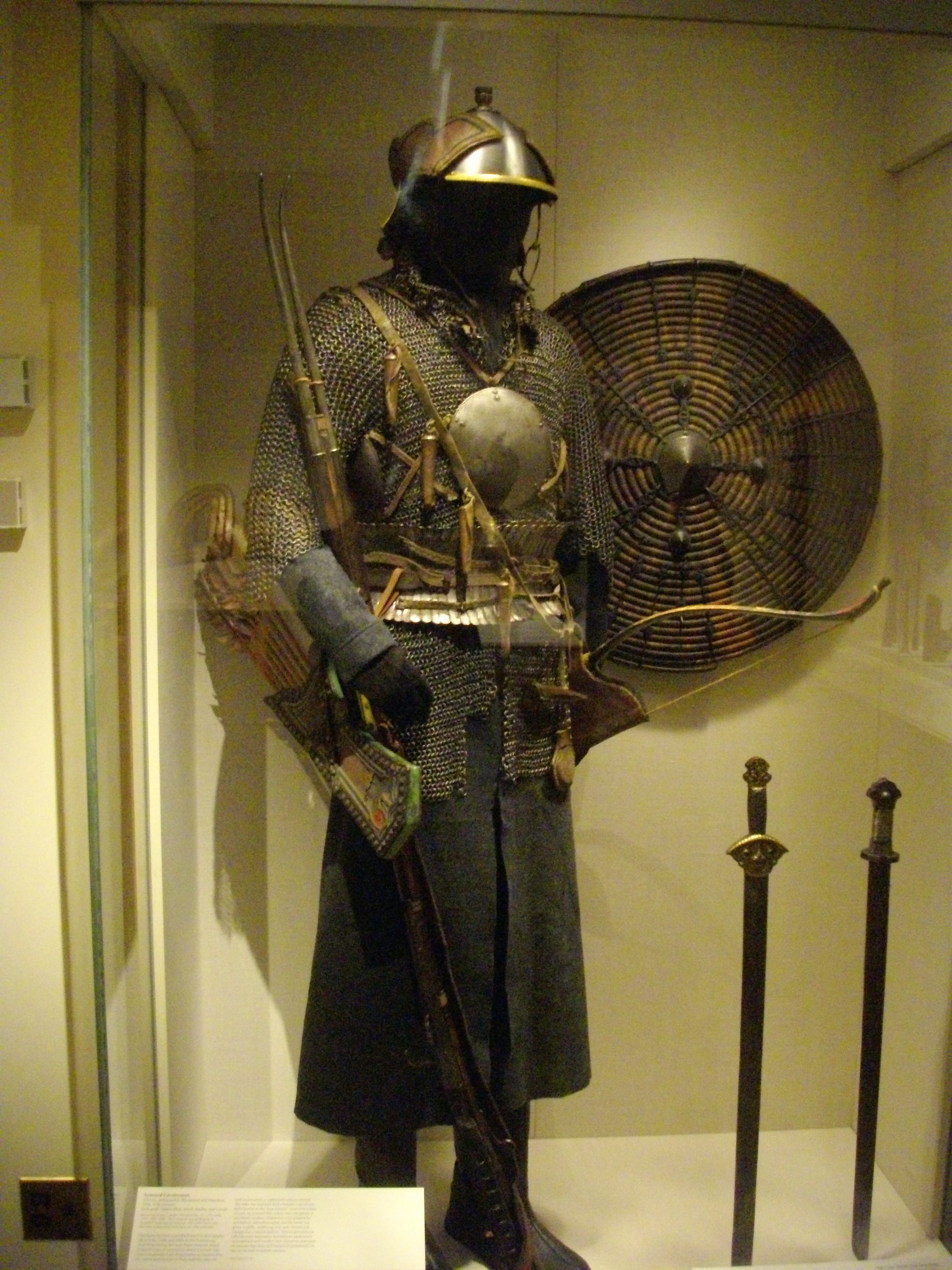
Tibetan Cavalry armor; riveted mail hauberk with mirror armor, steel helmet, armored belt, 18th–19th century, Met museum.

=== Development ===
According to Donald J. La Rocca of the Metropolitan Museum of Art's Department of Arms and Armor, Tibetan soldiers were most commonly protected by body armor, a helmet, and a rattan-reed shield reinforced with iron struts. Tibetan cavalry also protected their horses's bodies with thin leather armor and their heads with thick iron plates. The most common form of Tibetan armor was lamellar armor called byang bu'i khrab, which was created by overlapping squares of force-absorbing material.

A common material used in Tibetan armor was leather (which was really untanned or superficially tanned rawhide). Higher ranking Tibetan soldiers were equipped with iron or copper lamellar armor, often elaborately decorated with gold inlay. In later eras, iron-worked mail armor was used after being introduced. Some Eastern Tibetan tribes were speculated to have employed heavy infantry clad entirely in iron armor. This observation is complemented by an account by Chinese historian Du You in his encyclopedia Tongdian. He had noted that, during the reign of the Tibetan Empire (7th to 9th centuries AD), Tibetan heavy infantry were entirely encased in armor. He wrote that,

The men and horses all wear chain mail armor. Its workmanship is extremely fine. It envelops them completely, leaving openings only for the two eyes. Thus, strong bows and sharp swords cannot injure them. Their archery is weak but their armor is strong.

— Du You

Starting in the 17th century, Tibetan cavalrymen rode into battle protected by four large iron disks strapped to their torsos, backs, and sides, a method of protection dubbed "the four mirrors" (me long bzhi). These heavy cavalrymen also wore specialized helmets with iron wings on the sides. Some Tibetan armorers produced plate armor known as duru. Developments in armor design continued into the age of gunpowder, as the relative remoteness of the Tibetan plateau isolated Tibetan armorers from having to contend with the widespread use of firearms in warfare.

=== Decoration and religious usage ===
Tibetan arms and armor were used outside of the battlefield. Ceremonial armor was used as part of rituals during the annual Great Prayer Festival in Lhasa. To evoke the aid of guardian deities, specialized shrines called Gonkhang Mgon Khang were established in Buddhist temples. These shrines housed the venerated arms and armor of Tibetan warriors, and it was these chapels that preserved many of the pieces of Tibetan armor that survive to the present day. As far as decorations are concerned, many high-quality works of Tibetan armor were decorated with inlaid precious metals, gemstones, or were emblazoned with Buddhist iconography.

== Gallery ==
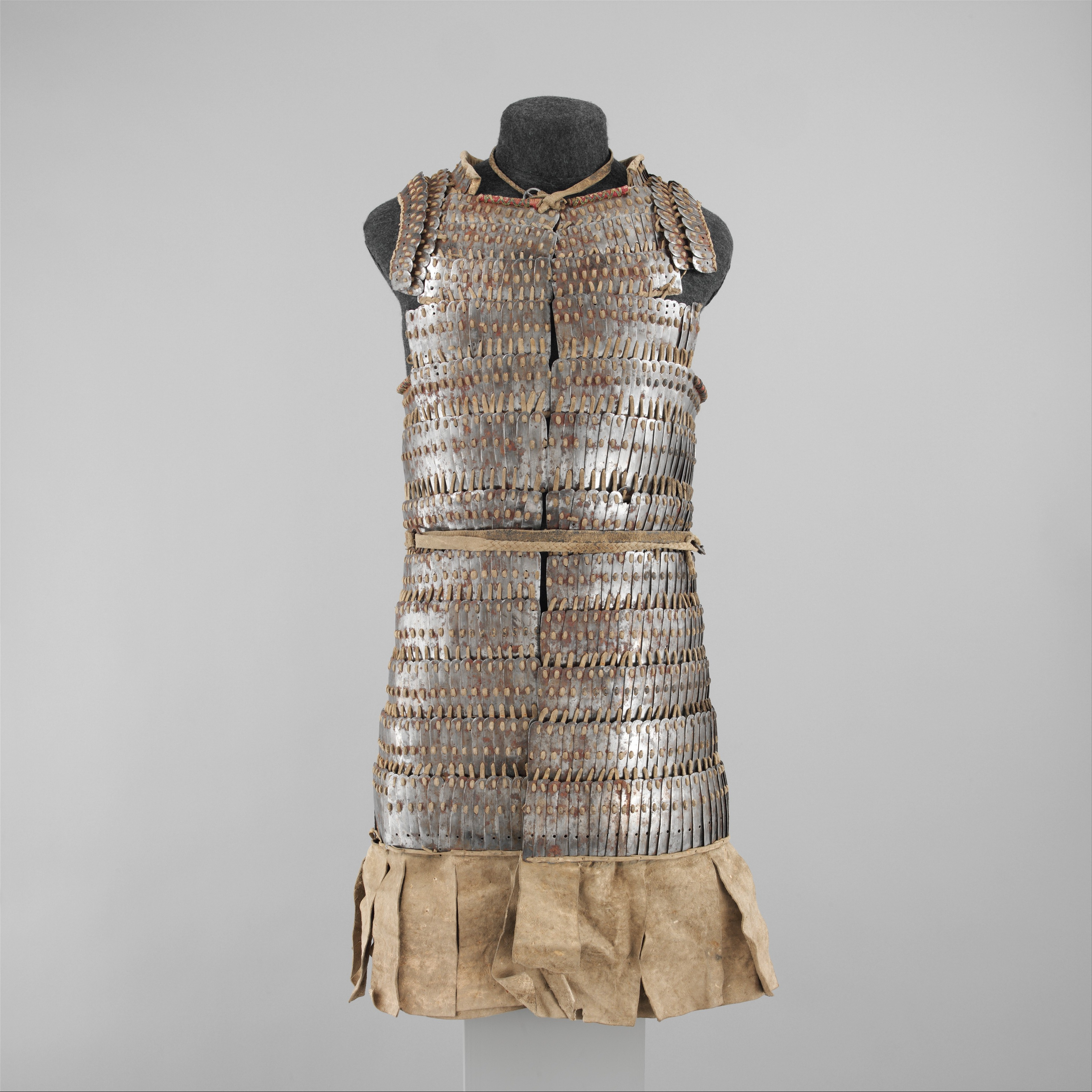
16th century Tibetan lamellar armor. Composed of iron and leather overlapping, interlocking squares designed to reduce the force of an impact.

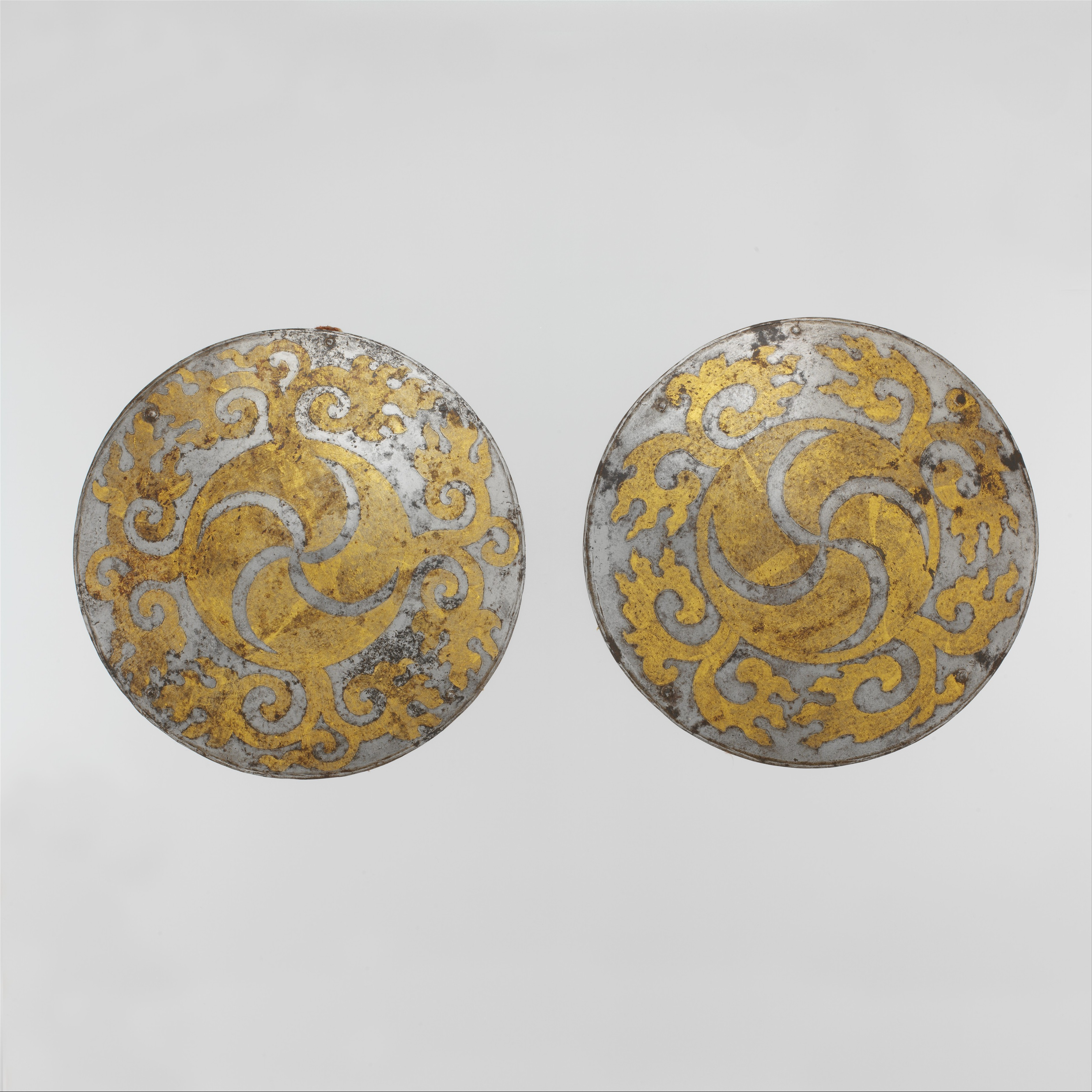
Breastplate and backplate from a set of "four mirrors", ornamented with gold, 17th–18th century, Met museum.

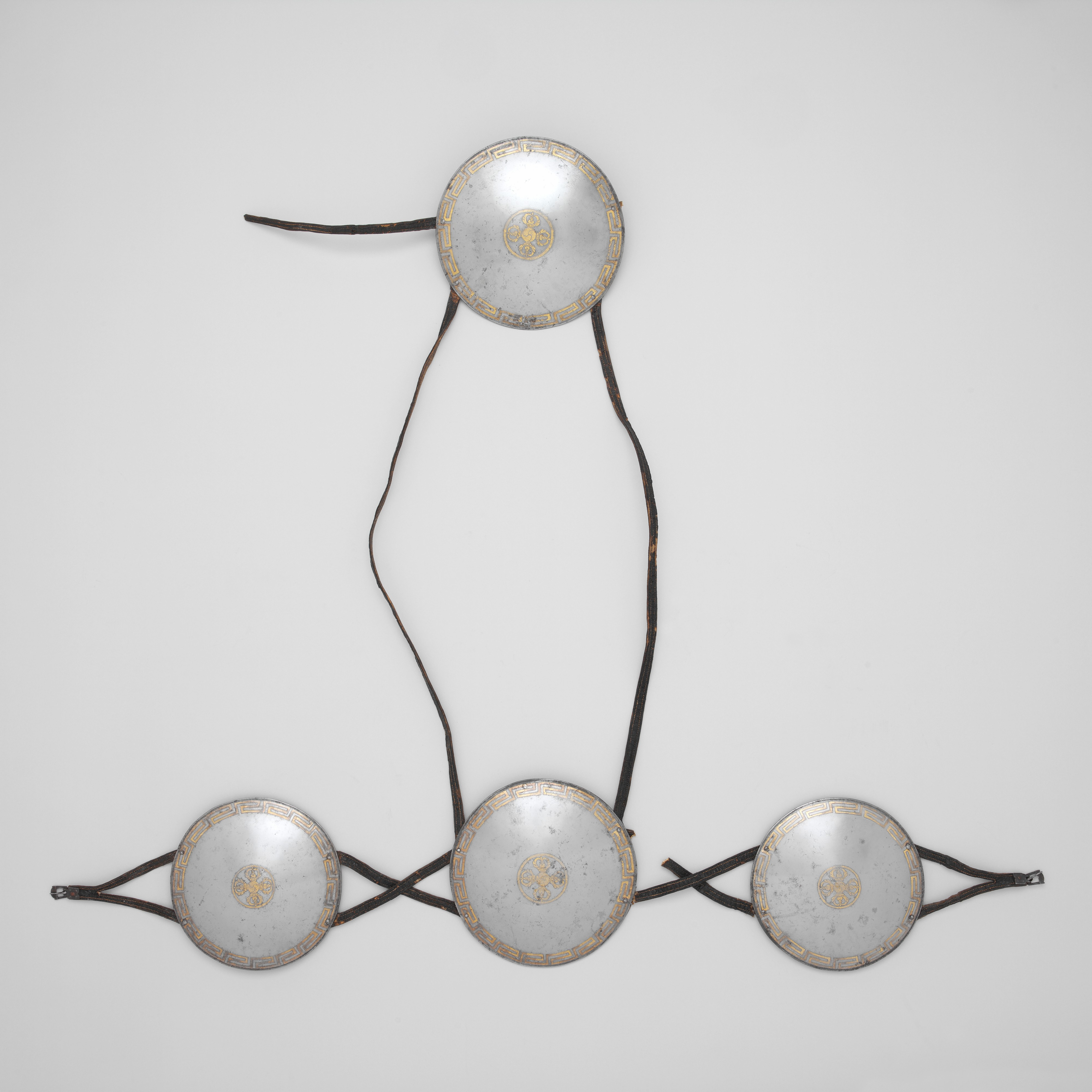
A set of "four mirrors", 18th–19th century, Met museum.

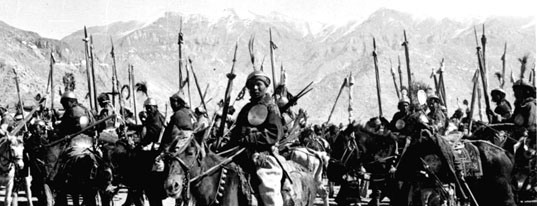
Tibetan mounted warriors.

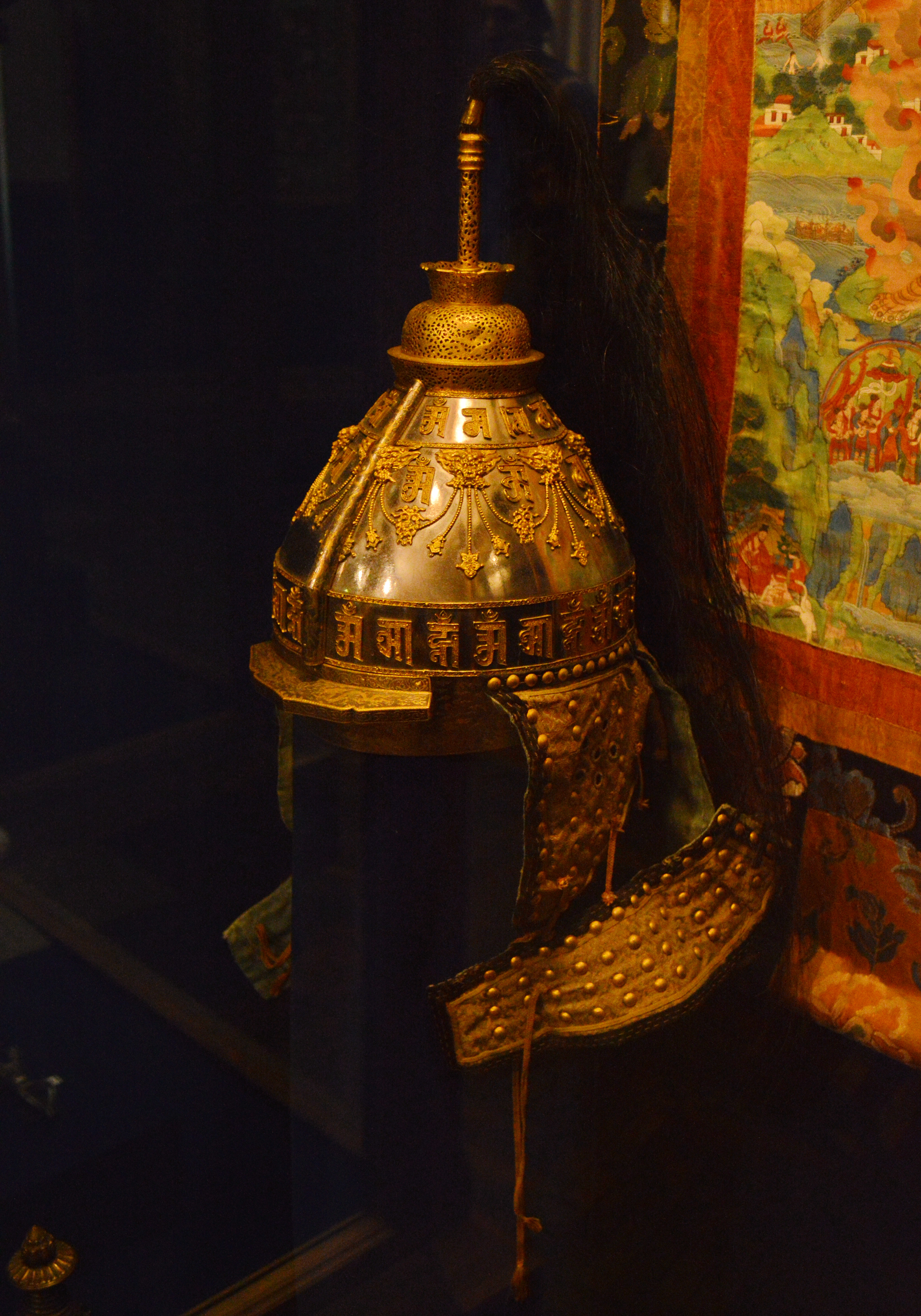
Ceremonial helmet, Tibet, 18th century.
