= Saint Maurice (Lucas Cranach the Elder and Workshop) =

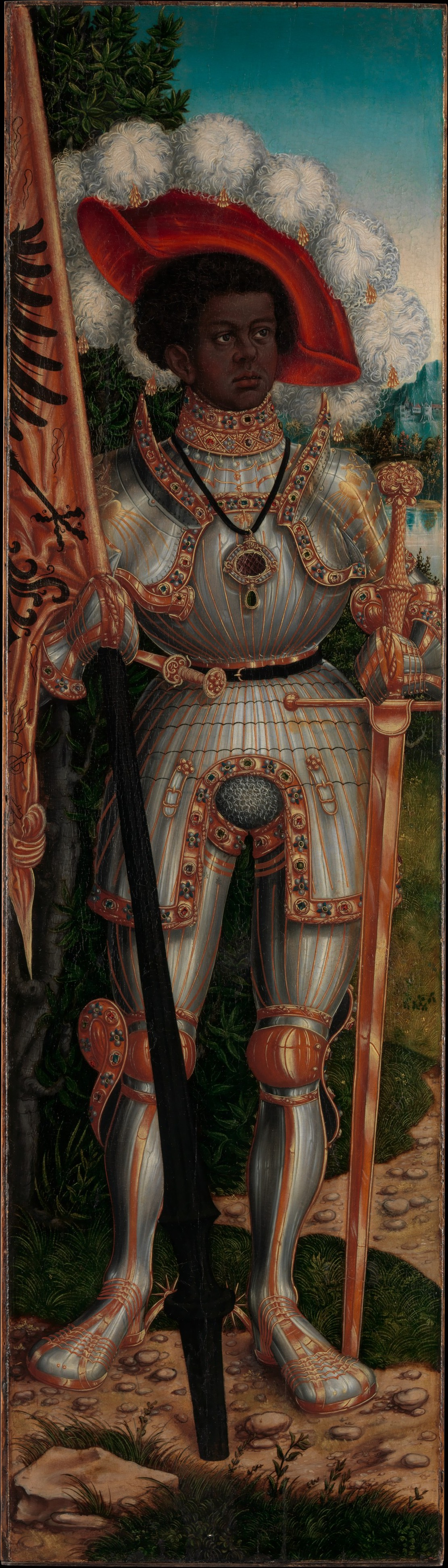
- Artist: Lucas Cranach the Elder and Workshop
- Year: ca. 1520-1525
- Medium: Oil on linden
- Location: Metropolitan Museum of Art; New York City

Saint Maurice is a painting attributed to Lucas Cranach the Elder and his workshop depicting Saint Maurice, an early Christian martyr from North Africa. It was made for a church in Halle (Saale), specifically Marktkirche, as the interior left wing of a larger paneled altarpiece. Saint Maurice was the patron saint of the church.

== Description ==
The piece depicts Saint Maurice in a full set of highly adorned plate armor, while wielding a golden sword, with a dagger and banner by his side. He wears a red ostrich feather frilled cap atop his head as well as a pendant upon his chest. The banner has an eagle upon it but is otherwise covered similarly in gold. His armor has jewels embroidered into it and gold laced into the metal of the armor. Gilt badges are placed on the breastplate and pauldrons, signifying the Order of the Golden Fleece, Charles V's insignia.Behind him is a forested area, castle and sky. When it was a part of a larger altarpiece, it was located to the left of a Madonna centerpiece and a donor portrait of the patron of the artwork, Cardinal Albrecht of Brandenburg.

Armor and Accessories

The armor consists of highly adorned and gold laced pauldrons, breastplate, gorget, fauld and tassets.

The armor in the painting is based on one of the reliquaries containing relics of Saint Maurice that was housed inside the church. The relic was inserted in a wax statue wearing armor depicting the Saint Maurice; neither the relic nor the reliquary currently exist. The saint's armor in the painting is depicted as was made of silver and covered in gems and pearls. One of the prevailing academic theories is that the armor worn by the reliquary and used as a model for this painting was a suit that Charles V had worn at his coronation.

Given that the patron Albrecht of Brandenburg, who was archbishop-elector of Mainz at the time, was a leading figure in the coronation ceremony, he may have been gifted the armor afterwards.Nonetheless, there are reasons to believe that the reliquary was clad in worn Habsburg-style armor, or at the very least a model of Habsburg armor.

== Historical Context ==
Saint Maurice was originally commissioned by Albert of Brandenburg as part of fifteen other altarpieces for a church of his, the Marktkirche. It isn't known if the art piece was completed by the time of the church's dedication in 1523, but the piece was finished and catalogued as installed as of October 1525 according to the church records of its inventory.

Halle claimed to possess relics of Maurice and experienced a surge in the creation of new images of Saint Maurice with dark skin. These efforts to create more images is largely headed by the patron of this painting, Albert, who commissioned various works as the Cardinal of Brandenburg and then as Archbishop of Magdeburg. He was also the brother of the Elector of Brandenburg, a city that also held reliquaries of Saint Maurice.

Saint Maurice

Saint Maurice was a commander of the Theban Legion who was martyred along with his troops in the late third century for their refusal to persecute other Christians. The Theban Legion was an all-Egyptian unit of Roman legionnaires that he led. St. Maurice's death occurred in what is now Switzerland.

Prior to the time period of this painting, St. Maurice hadn't been commonly depicted with dark skin. This tradition to represent him as such started in the mid-thirteenth century and Cranach perpetuated this style of depiction.

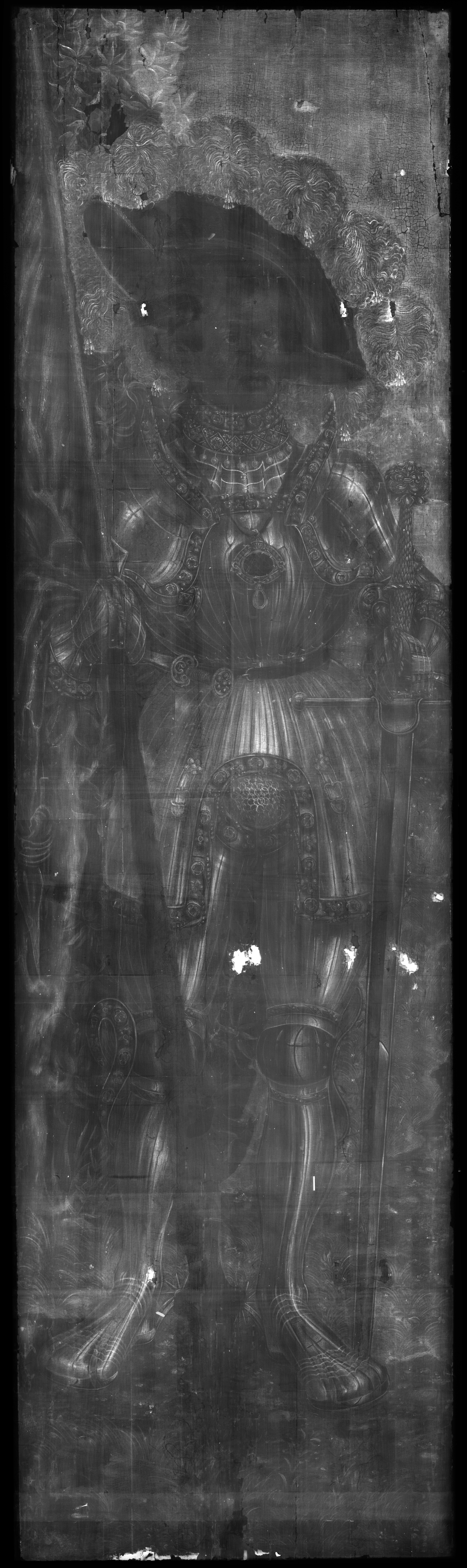
Saint Maurice, covered in grime prior to restoration.

This tradition of depicting Saint Maurice as a black figure was shown first in Magdeburg then later in the northeastern part of German speaking lands. This darker skinned version of Maurice was likely due to several factors at the time, both in language, local understanding, and importance to Hohenstaufen imperial imagery. St. Maurice likely got the association with darker skin due to his name resembling the word "moor," an English word with Germanic origins, a term used for Muslim, black, and/or North African people. In addition, there was a local idea that people of dark complexion were Egyptian. However, one of the main reasons for Saint Maurice being depicted in this manner came from the role that dark skinned individuals played in Hohenstaufen imperial imagery. In imperial imagery, dark skinned individuals were symbolic of universal sovereignty. The iconography of depicting Saint Maurice in this way spread to the Baltic, Scandinavian and German lands but not much elsewhere despite veneration of the Saint himself in farther lands. The iconography of depicting Saint Maurice in this way spread to the Baltic, Scandinavian and German lands but not much elsewhere despite veneration of the Saint himself in farther lands.

== Restoration ==
The painting was donated to and restored by the Metropolitan Museum of Art in 2005. At first glance, it was difficult to tell what repairs were needed other than upon the linden panel. This was due to the amount of grime and discolored varnish that coated the painting, covering the painting and obscuring the damages. Conservators George Bisacca and Michael Alan Miller restored the panel, while the cleaning and restoration work was done by Micheal Gallagher.

Attribution

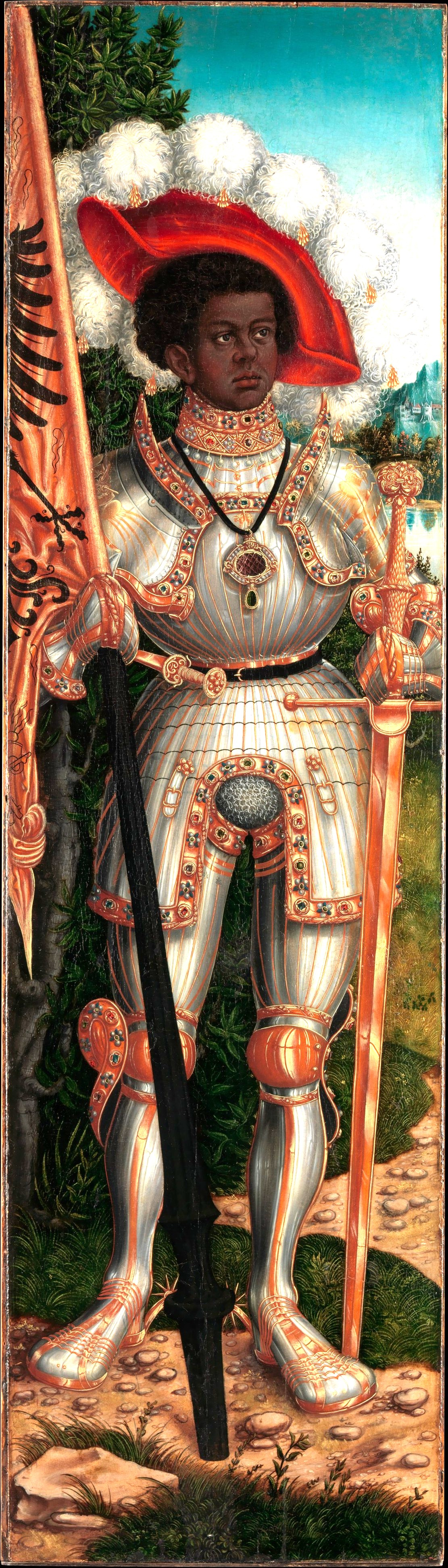
Saint Maurice, post restoration

The Metropolitan Museum inspected the altarpiece for authenticity and to identify the artist. After identifying that Cranach likely took part in the painting, the museum then endeavored to investigate which parts of the painting may have been completed by Cranach alone or with help from his workshop. One of the ways that they accomplished this was via the use of infrared reflectography in order to individually analyze the individual brushstrokes.

With that method of analysis it was revealed the ostrich feathers were free drawn. The under-drawing was done in Cranach's own hand, with the painting of the armor given to his apprentice and his workshop. Several details on the armor were not planned via the underlayer by Cranach but were added on during the process, which is uncommon with paintings of this time period and in this medium. Charles V's insignia on both the breastplate and the pauldrons, most of the armor's jeweled elements and the grip of the sword were added later, with the latter two in particular only suggested by the under-layering Under-drawn flutes of the breastplates conform to the shape of the chest, while the painted breastplates lack this conformity. The plates of the faulds are rounded in the underlayer, yet the painter produced these as straight lines.

After identifying this and varying amount of skill throughout the process of painting this, it was determined that Cranach mainly worked on the underlayers of the piece but left the rest of the details to his workshop. Additional evidence includes the fact that compared to a similar painting by Cranach the Elder, Judith with the Head of Holofernes, the necklace depicted upon Saint Maurice shows less light refractive properties.
