= Spaulder =

Piece of armor to protect the shoulder

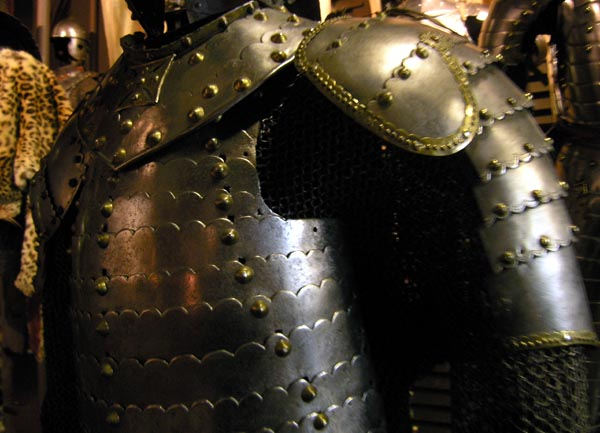
A set of spaulders

A modern replica spaulder

Spaulders are pieces of armour in a harness of plate armour. Typically, they are a single plate of steel or iron covering the shoulder with bands (lames) joined by straps of leather or rivets. By the 1450s, however, they were often attached to the upper cannon or rerebrace, a feature that continued into the 16th century.

== Description ==
According to some pictorial evidence of the early Middle Ages, such as the Barberini Ivory, Roman officers wore single spaulders with pteruges attached to protect their upper arms and shoulders.

The use of spaulders developed in the West during the 14th century, appearing more often in the 1300s. Unlike pauldrons, spaulders do not cover the armpits. Instead, the gaps may be covered by besagews or simply left bare, exposing the mail beneath.

== Modern use ==
Though the use of spaulders has declined, craftsmen and machine shops still exist which can craft a pair of spaulders for use in a museum or in simulated combat during reenactments.

Additionally, the Iraq War saw the introduction of a modern-day version of the spaulder, in the form of the "Deltoid Axillary Protector" add-on to the Interceptor body armour worn by US soldiers.
