= Rondel (armour) =

Circular metal plate used on late-medieval armour

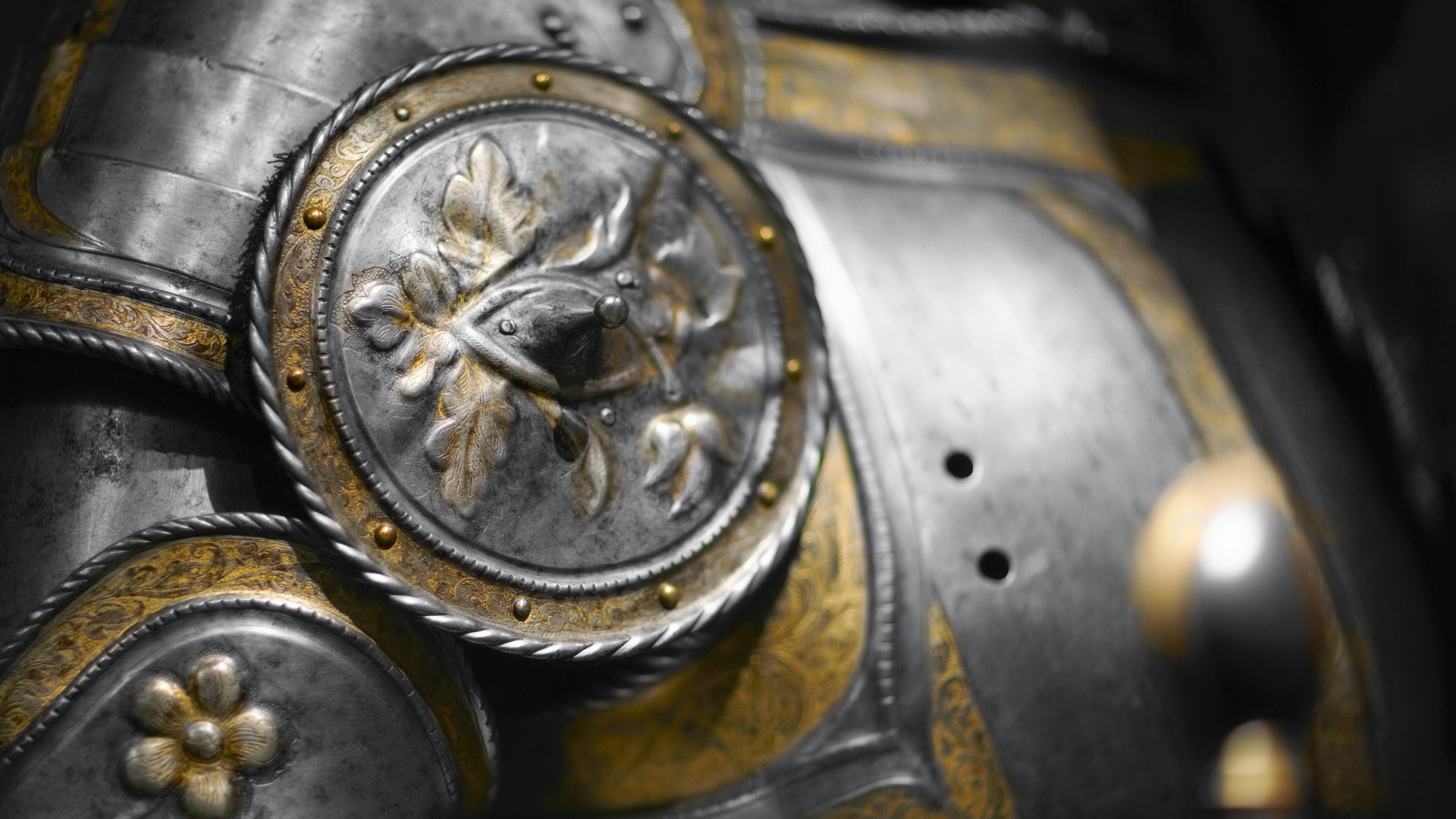
16th-century cuirass with shoulder-hung besagews, Livrustkammaren.

A rondel (French: rondelle; not to be confused with a vamplate, which was referred to by the same term) is a circular, disk-shaped plate of metal added to a harness of late-medieval plate armor to close structural gaps or to reinforce vulnerable straps and hinges. The rondel was also used in weapons as a handguard, in particular the rondel dagger but also in swords.

== Historical development ==
The first rondels appeared in the late 14th century, soon after rigid cuirasses made of breastplates and backplates had replaced the earlier coat of plates. By the mid-15th century their use had spread throughout Europe until being phased out in field armour of the mid 16th century.

== Typology and applications ==
=== Armpit defenses ===
In late medieval and Renaissance armour the armpits were protected by besagews. These often took the form of plain, slightly convex rondels that hung from either the pauldron or the top edge of the gorget, covering the otherwise exposed gap at the arm's forward pivot. The plate was normally secured with a very short leather strap and buckle, with laces, or on some breastplates by a turning pin.

=== Head defenses ===
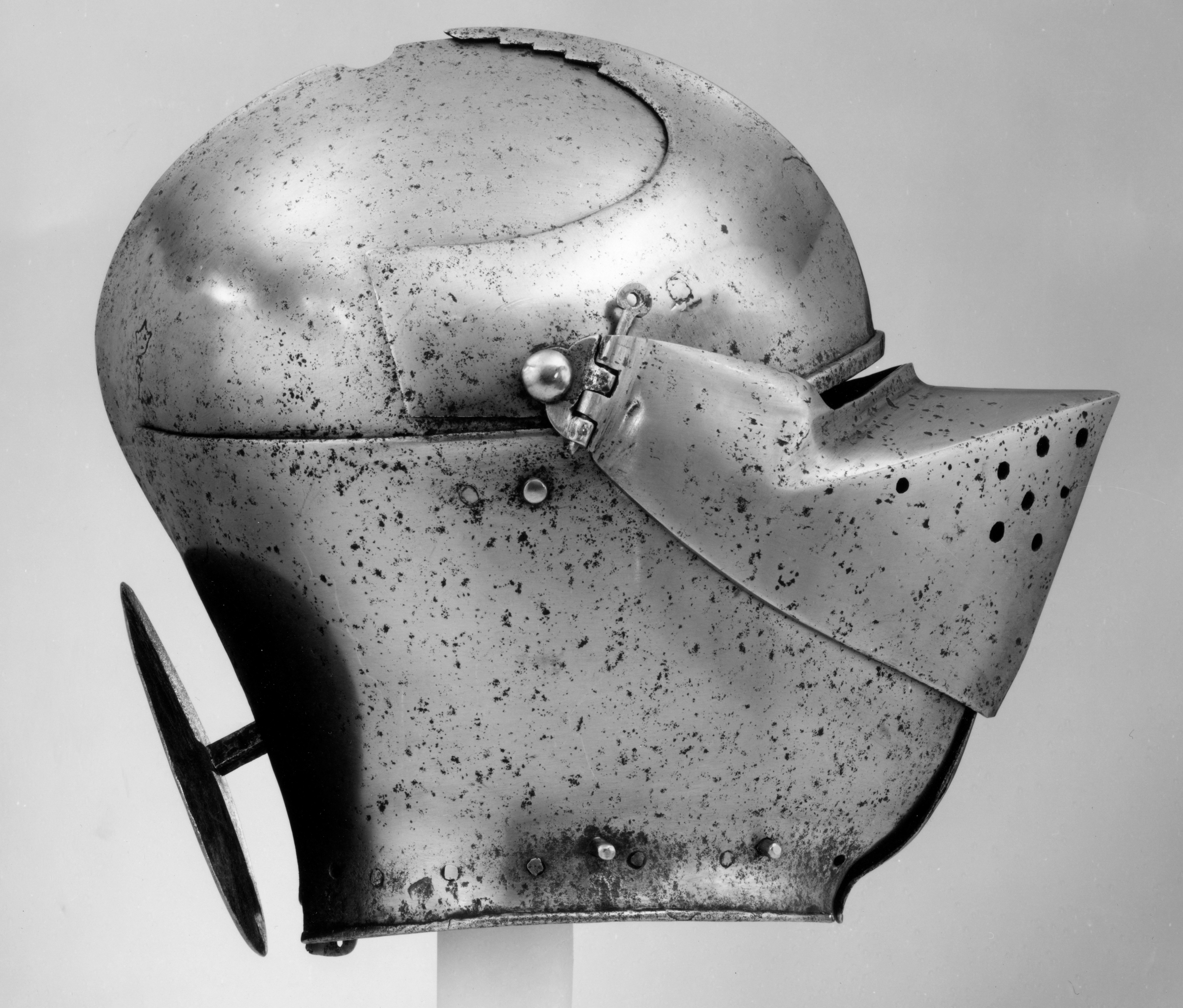
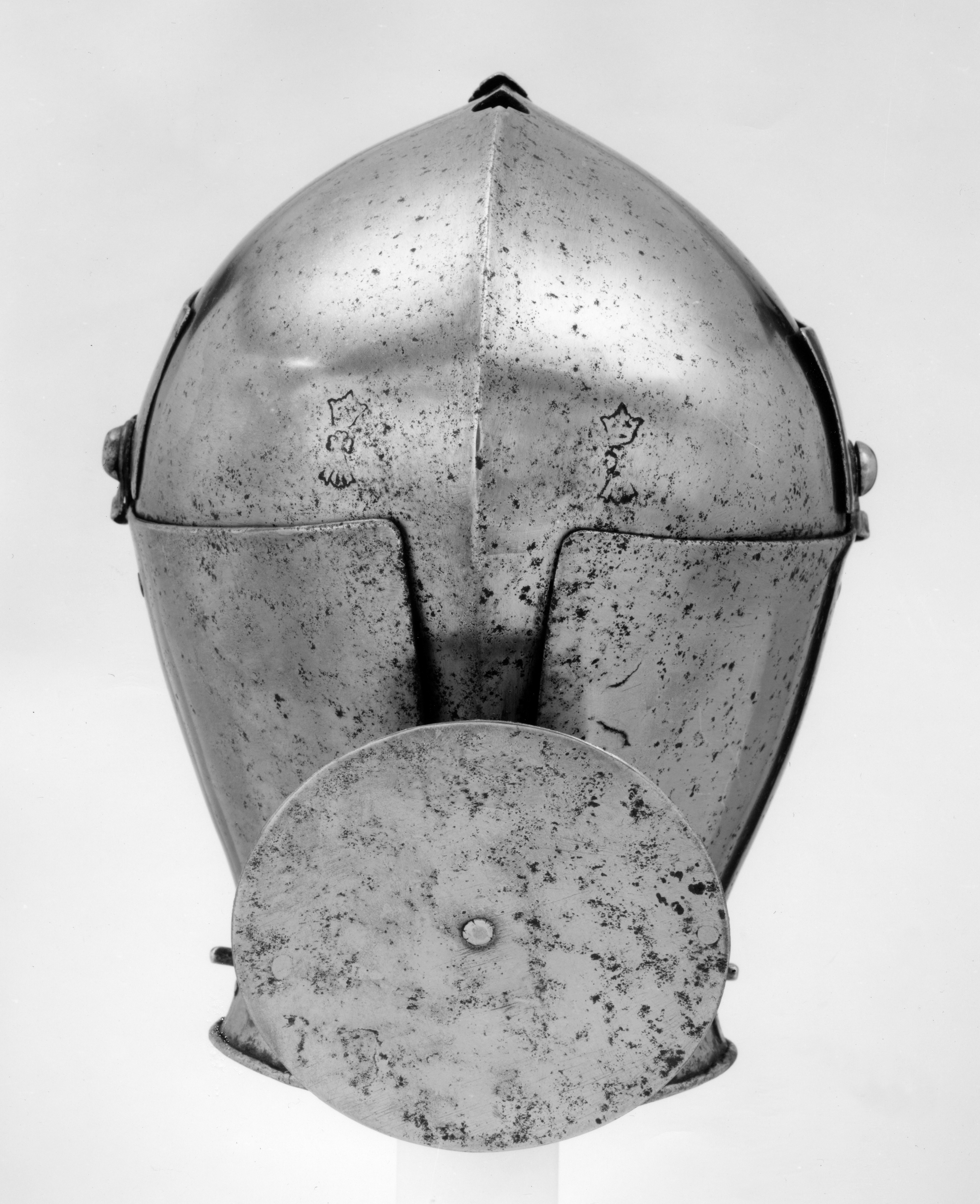
An Italian armet from c. 1450–60 housed at the Metropolitan Museum of Art, featuring a rondel (or volet) on the nape

Armets often carried a small rondel, also called a volet, attached to the nape of the helmet's skull by a stem. This disk is believed to have protected the leather strap of the wrapper (a reinforce for the visor that preceded the buffe) and prevented an opponent from cutting it away, along with protecting the rear junction of the cheekpieces. Early close helmets, which often mimicked the style of the armet, also made use of rondels at the nape and occasionally at higher points of the skull of the helmet.

Rondels were also depicted in illuminated manuscripts being affixed to the sides of bascinets and sallets. Aventails were also sometimes depicted with rondels being affixed to them to cover the throat, much like a bevor.

=== Elbow disks ===
Some mid-14th-century armour employed a simple globular couter consisting of a rondel centred on the elbow joint. By the 15th century this form had largely been superseded by winged couters that wrapped around the joint.

=== Gauntlets ===
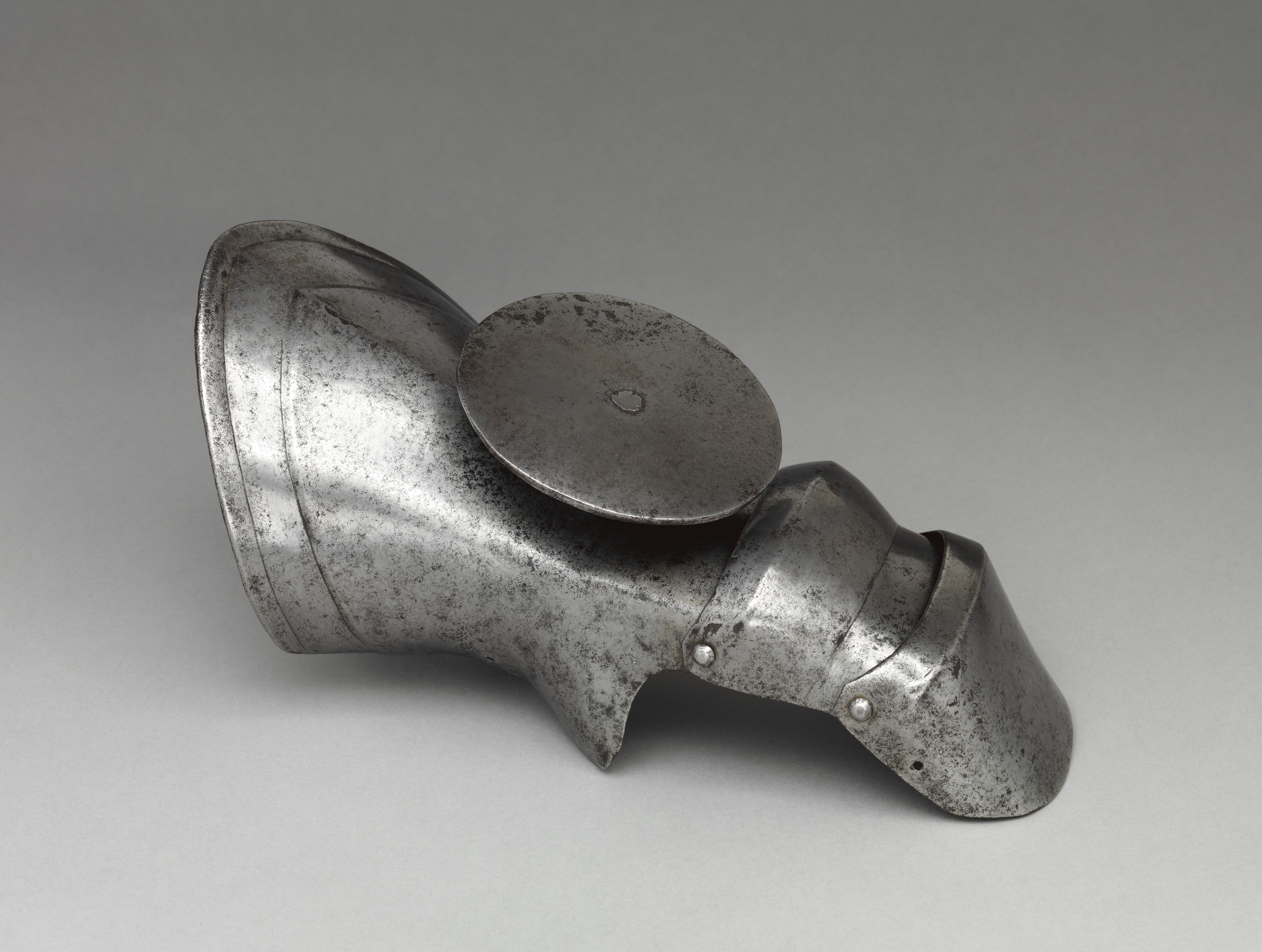
A main de fer type gauntlet with a rondel on the metacarpal

Small rondels occasionally strengthen the back of gauntlets, either brazed on or riveted through the glove lining, to stiffen the metacarpals and act as a stop for the tourney shield. The manifer (main de fer), a type of gauntlet that protected the left hand in the joust, employed the rondel as a reinforce.

=== Shaffrons ===
The shaffron, a forehead defense that formed part of the barding for a horse, sometimes featured a rondel in the midpoint between the horse's eyes where it was affixed with a spike on which it could rotate to dampen the impact of blows from blunt weapons. They were often ornate and formed part of the style of barding for nobility.

== See also ==
- Besagew, the armpit defense that often took the form of a rondel
- Mirror armor, eastern cuirasses made of large, polished rondels
