= Mirror armour =

Type of cuirass (armour)

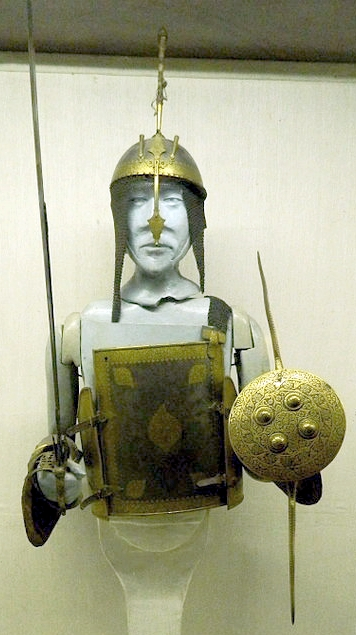
Classic Indian char-aina, also chahar-aina or chahar-ai-ne (the four mirrors), Persian (چهارآينه), shown with kulah khud helmet and madu shield, Mumtaz Mahal Museum, Red Fort, Delhi India.

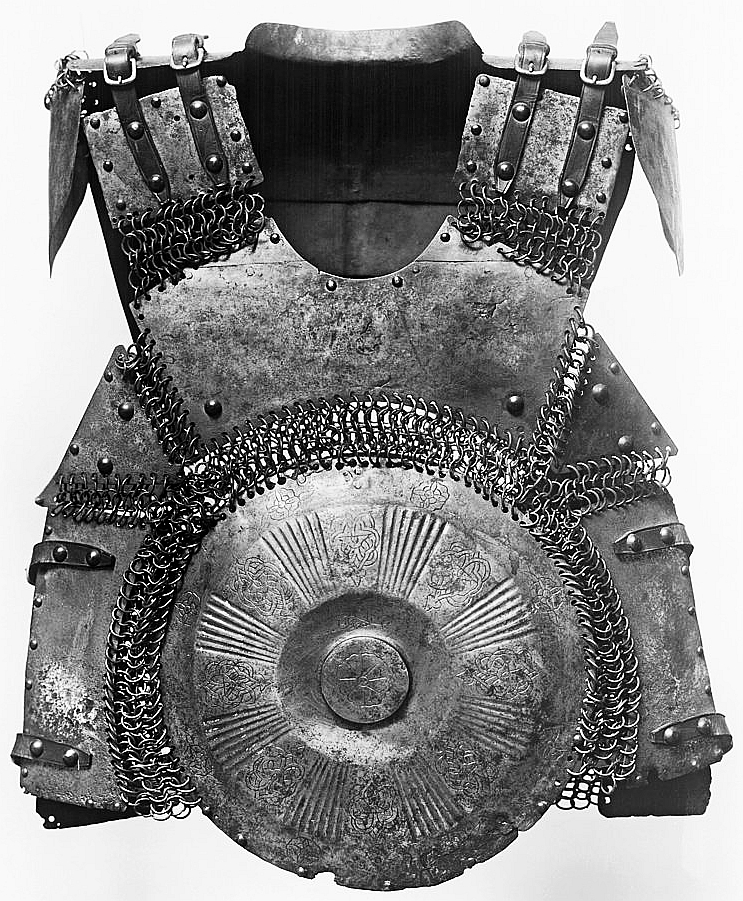
Early 16th century Ottoman mirror armour (krug), a distinctively Ottoman protection consisting of large round steel plates in the front and back connected by mail.

Mirror armour (Russian: зерцало, zertsalo, meaning "mirror"; Chinese: 护心镜, hùxīnjìng, meaning "protect-heart mirror"), sometimes referred to as disc armour or as chahār-āyneh or char-aina (Persian: چهارآینه meaning "four mirrors"; whence Kazakh: шар-айна, şar-ayna), is a type of cuirass that was used mainly in Asia and Eastern Europe, including India, Iran, Tibet, Russia, and the Ottoman Empire. It literally translates to "four mirrors" which is a reflection of how these pieces look, resembling four (sometimes more) metal discs or rectangular armour plates. Mirror armor was used in some cultures up to the 20th century.

== Description and history ==
"Mirror armour" is a type of partial plate armour which was developed initially from round metal mirrors (a kind of rondel) worn over other armour (usually over mail) as reinforcement. Metal mirrors in this armour were considered as protection from not only cold steel and arrows, but also supernatural influence. It was believed that mirrors could reflect the evil eye, so they were polished and worn over other armour.

Early mirror armour consisted of a round mirror attached to the body with a few leather laces (similar to the Roman phaelerae). In Europe, they were known as kardiophylax (Greek) or apezak (Armenian) and were popular with various Bronze Age civilizations, as well as the Central Asian tribes such as the Saka and Yuezhi, and also among the Sasanians. The Kardiophylax was used by the Samnites before they developed the triple-disc cuirass. Although, it continued to be used as a Status symbol after it was discontinued from popular use. This armor would go on to be used by Salian priests as a form of ritual dress.

Late mirror armour took the form of a mirror cuirass, helmet, greaves, and bracers worn with mail. There were two alternative constructions of mirror cuirass:

- with discs – two large round mirrors surrounded by smaller mirror plates, such as the Klivanion.
- without discs – typically having four mirror plates – frontplate, backplate, and two sideplates joined by hinges or laces.

Early types of this armour were known among the Celtiberians, by the Romans, in West Asia, Central Asia, India, Russia, Siberia (where it was worn by Siberian natives before the Russian conquest), Mongolia, Indochina and China (including Tibet).

Later types of this armour were known in West and Central Asia, India, and Russia. The mirror cuirass with discs was popular in Turkey and Russia, while that without discs was popular in Iran, Central Asia and India.

In India, there was a popular form of brigandine with a few mirror plates riveted to it.

According to Bobrov, round metal mirrors worn by Mongolian warriors as armour reinforcement are shown in Persian miniatures of 13c. This is verified by archaeological finds in Central and East Asia. This kind of armour prevailed in Central Asia during 15–17c, and could be worn over any armour including brigandines, lamellar armour, chainmail and even plated mail. In 16c Iran, mirror plates became much larger and changed their shape to rectangular in order to improve body protection. This improved mirror armour gradually spread during 16–17c to Central Asia and North India. Further improvements were made during the 1640s when mirror plates evolved into mirror cuirass, which sometimes had additional mirror plates used as pauldrons for protection of the shoulder laces. Besides separate mirror plates laced as reinforcement to other armours there were small mirrors that were sewn or riveted to brigandine. Brigandines with such integral reinforcements were very popular at the end of the 15th century, but their use had practically been abandoned by the end of the 17th century.

Many modern army ballistic vests resemble the "Chahar-Aine" layout with basic soft anti-fragmentation armour (analogue of chain mail) covering a large area, and two, four or even more bulletproof plates ("mirrors") worn above it, thus combining weight saving and freedom of movement with high level of protection of vital areas.

Ottoman 15th to 16th century mirror armour is commonly referred to as "Krug", while the name for the same type of armour in Russia is зерцало (zertsalo), and the modern technical term is зерцальный доспех (zertsal'niy dospekh), from the Russian зерцальный (zertsal'niy) – "mirror"; and Russian: доспех (dospekh) – "armour".

Zertsalo consisted of a number plates that formed the two halves: front and rear. Each sides consists of: a middle plate called the "krug" (rondel), side plates, upper plates (above the "krug") called "ozherelie" (gorget) and "obruch" (ring) enveloping the neck; the front side additionally had "naramki" – shoulder strappings, and the back side had – "naplechniki" (pauldrons)
Зерцало состояло из ряда досок, образовавших две половины – переднюю и заднюю. Каждую половину составляли: средняя доска, или круг, боковые дощечки, верхние (над кругом), или ожерелье, и обруч – часть, обхватывающая шею; у передней половины были еще нарамки – плечевые скрепления, а у задней – наплечки

— Brockhaus and Efron Encyclopedic Dictionary

== Gallery ==
Mirror armours:

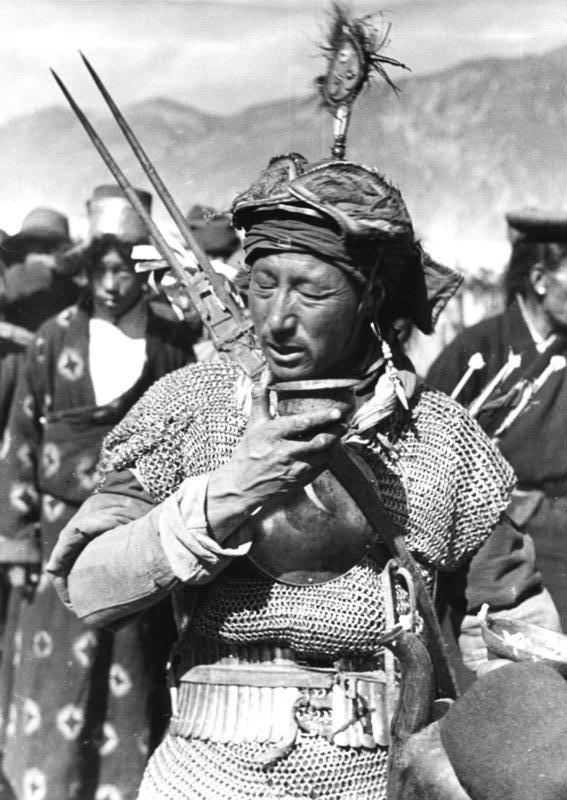
Tibetan round mirror plate shown worn over mail on the chest, circa 1938.

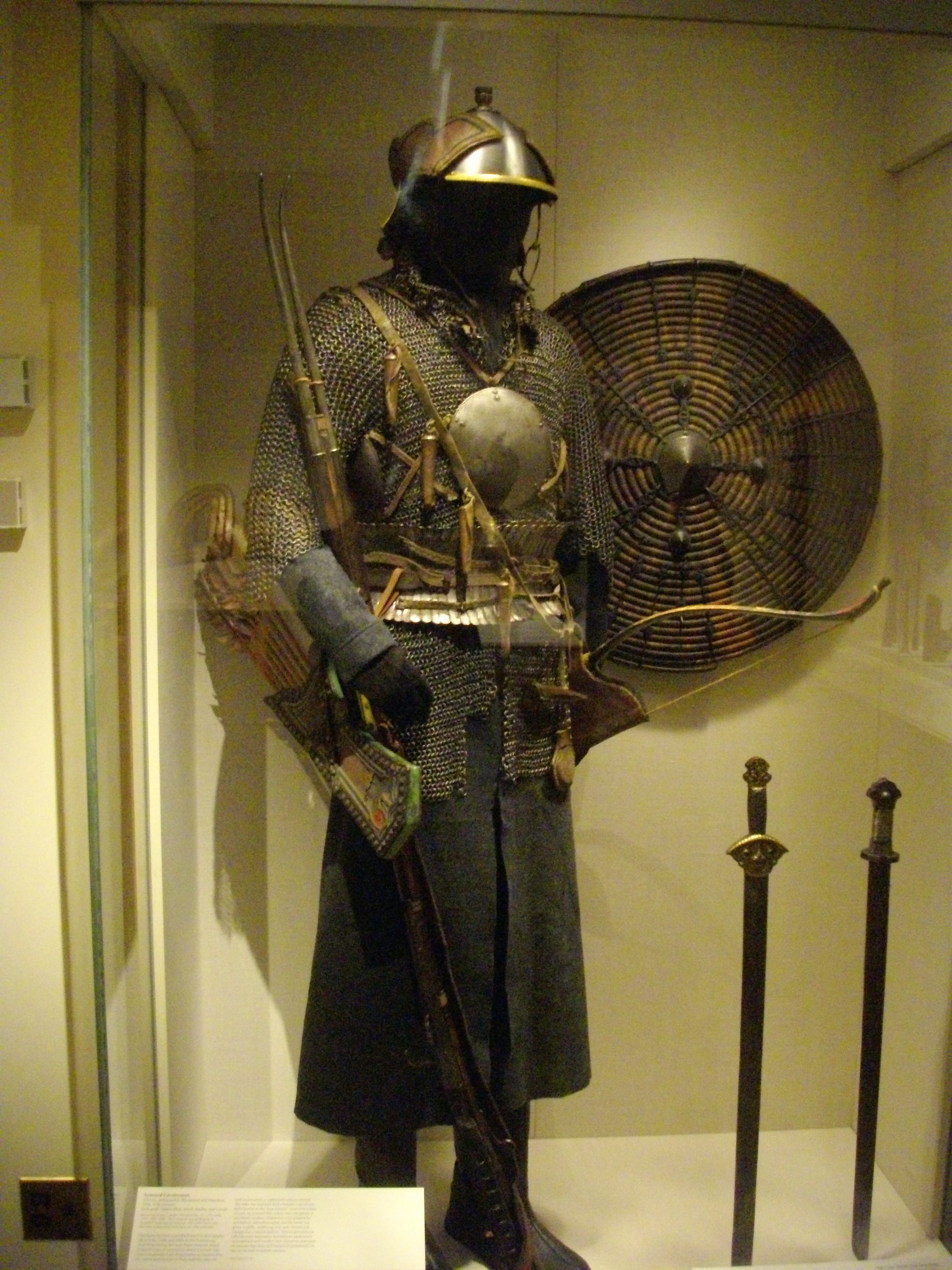
Tibetan mirror armour; four mirrors (me long bzhi) with the front and one side plate visible and worn over a mail hauberk.

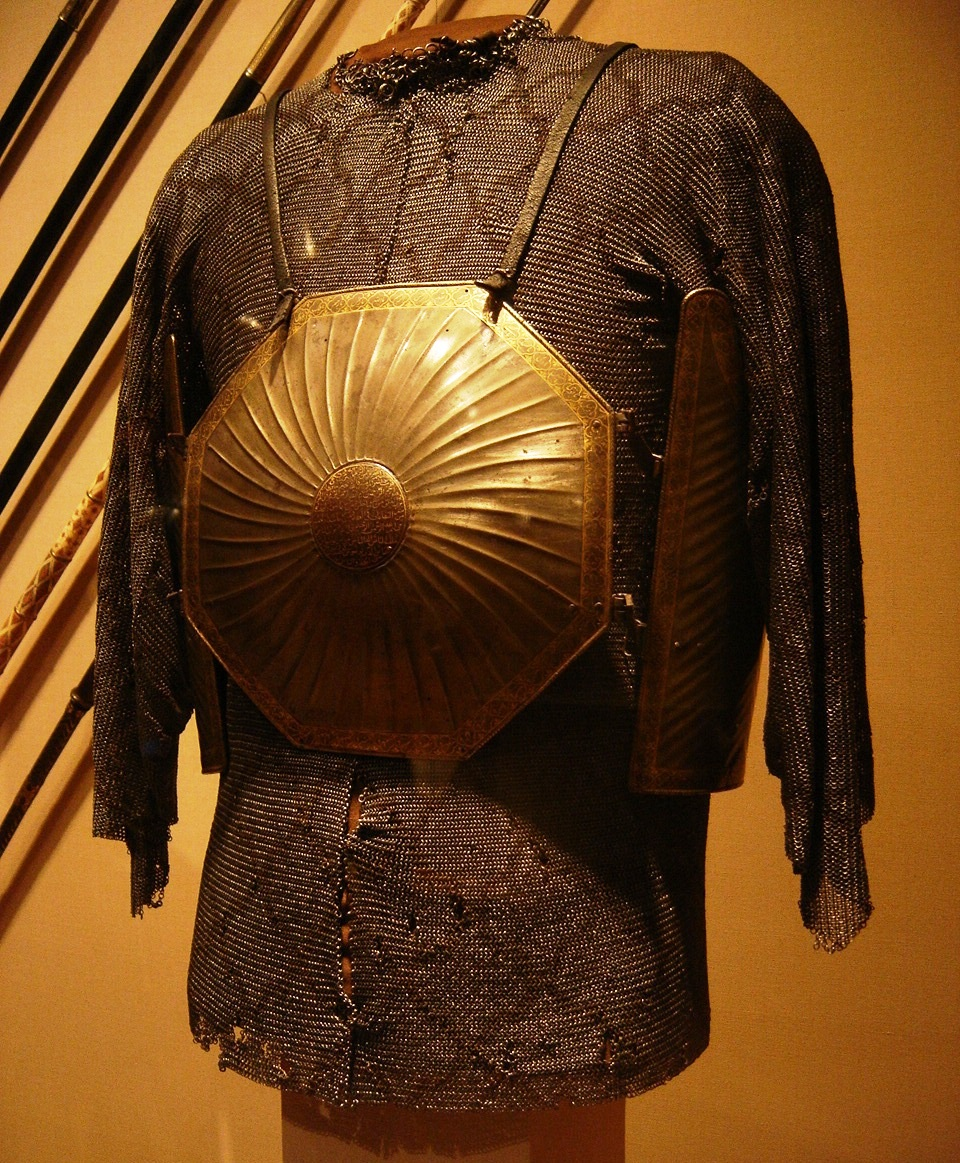
Char-aina with octagonal front plate.

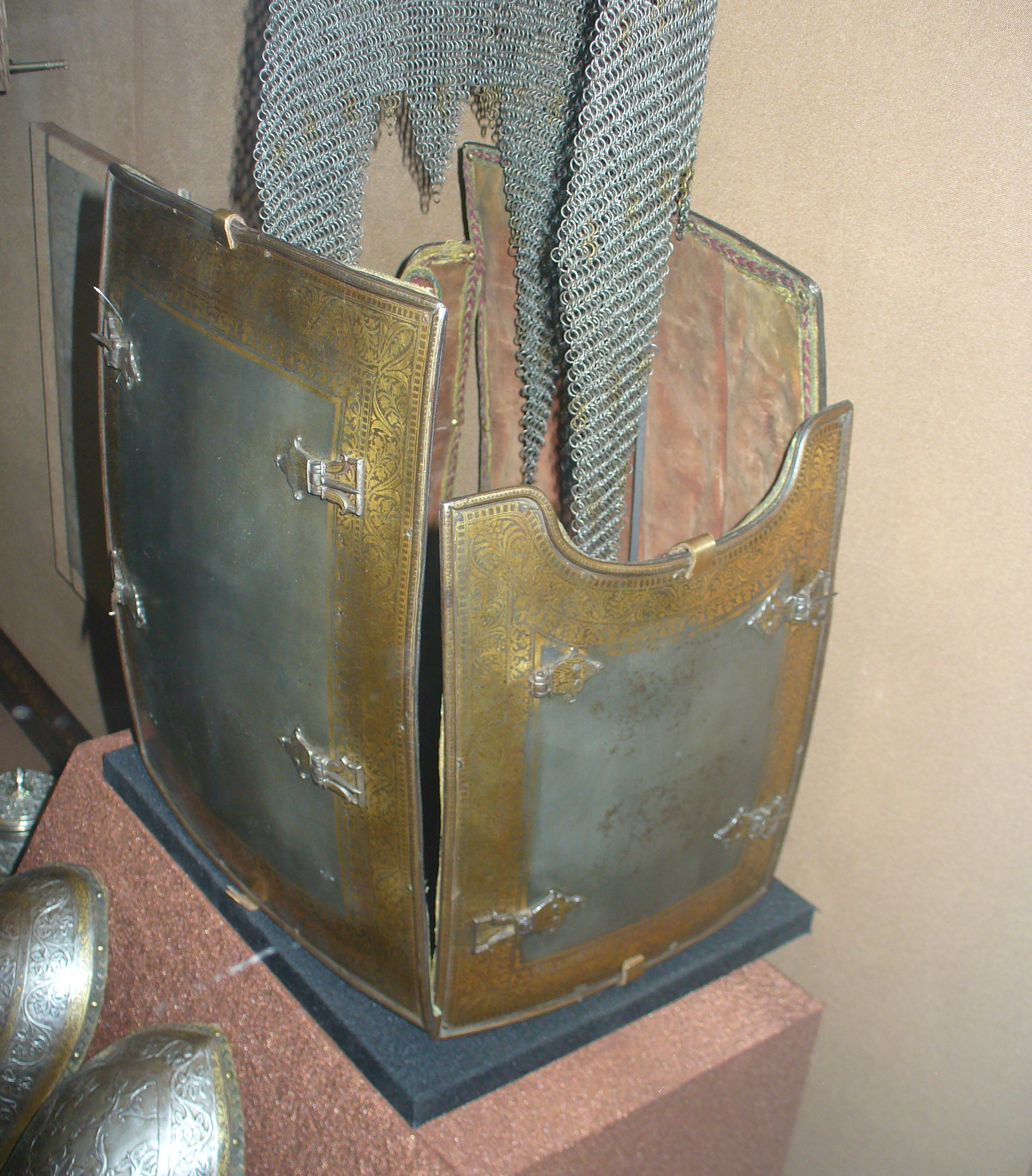
Classic 4-mirror Chahār-Āyneh

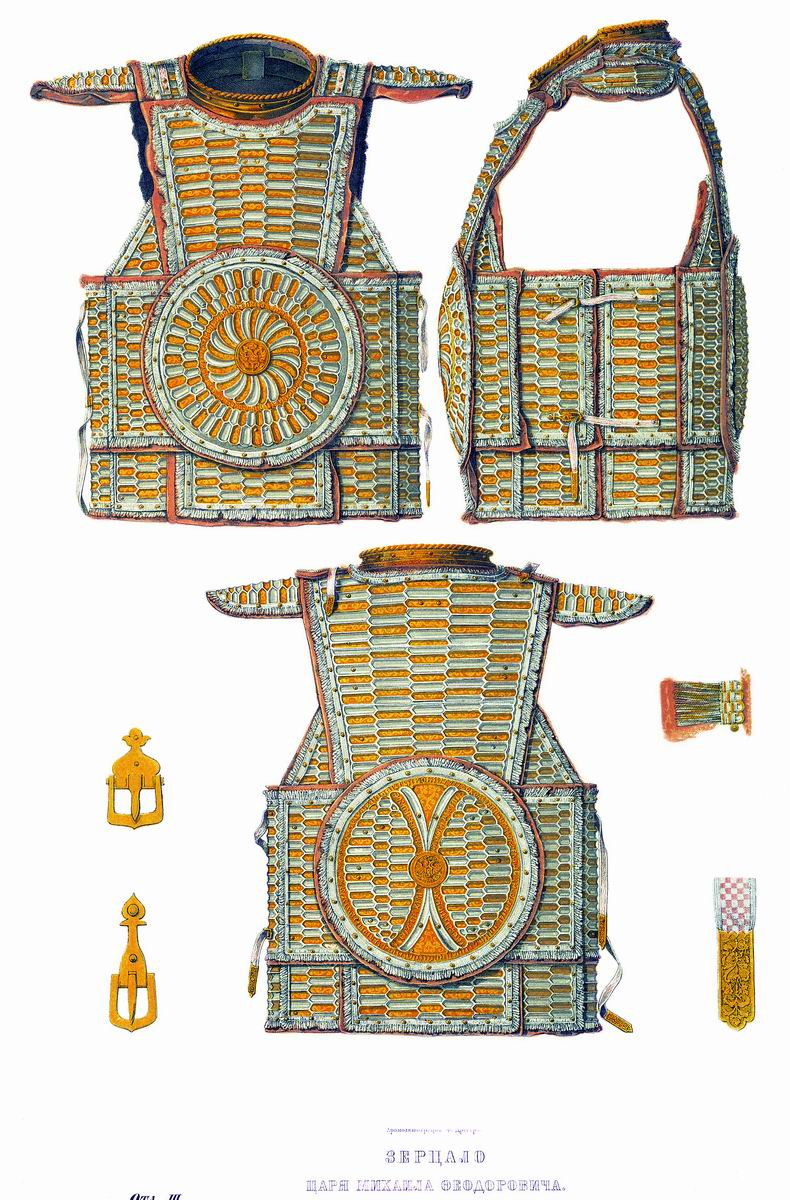
Alternative mirror armour with discs.

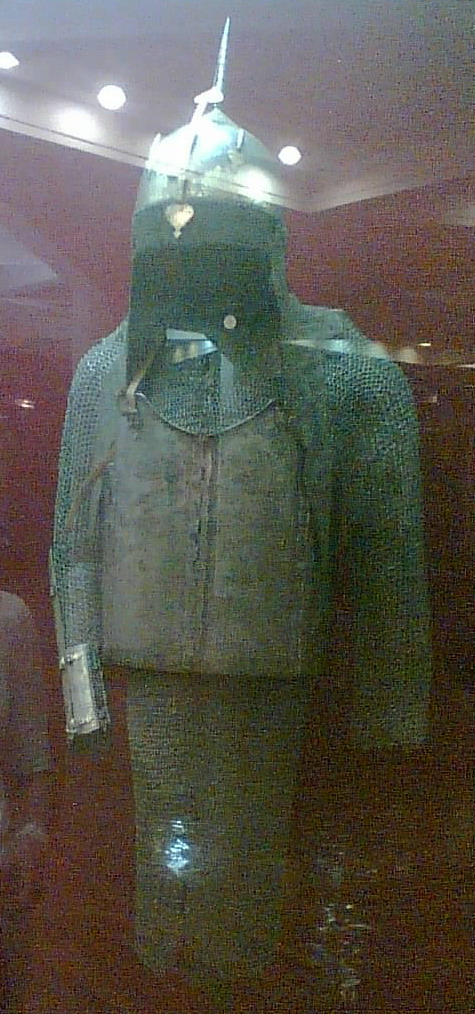
Late Chahar-Ai-Ne consisting of five plates instead of four.

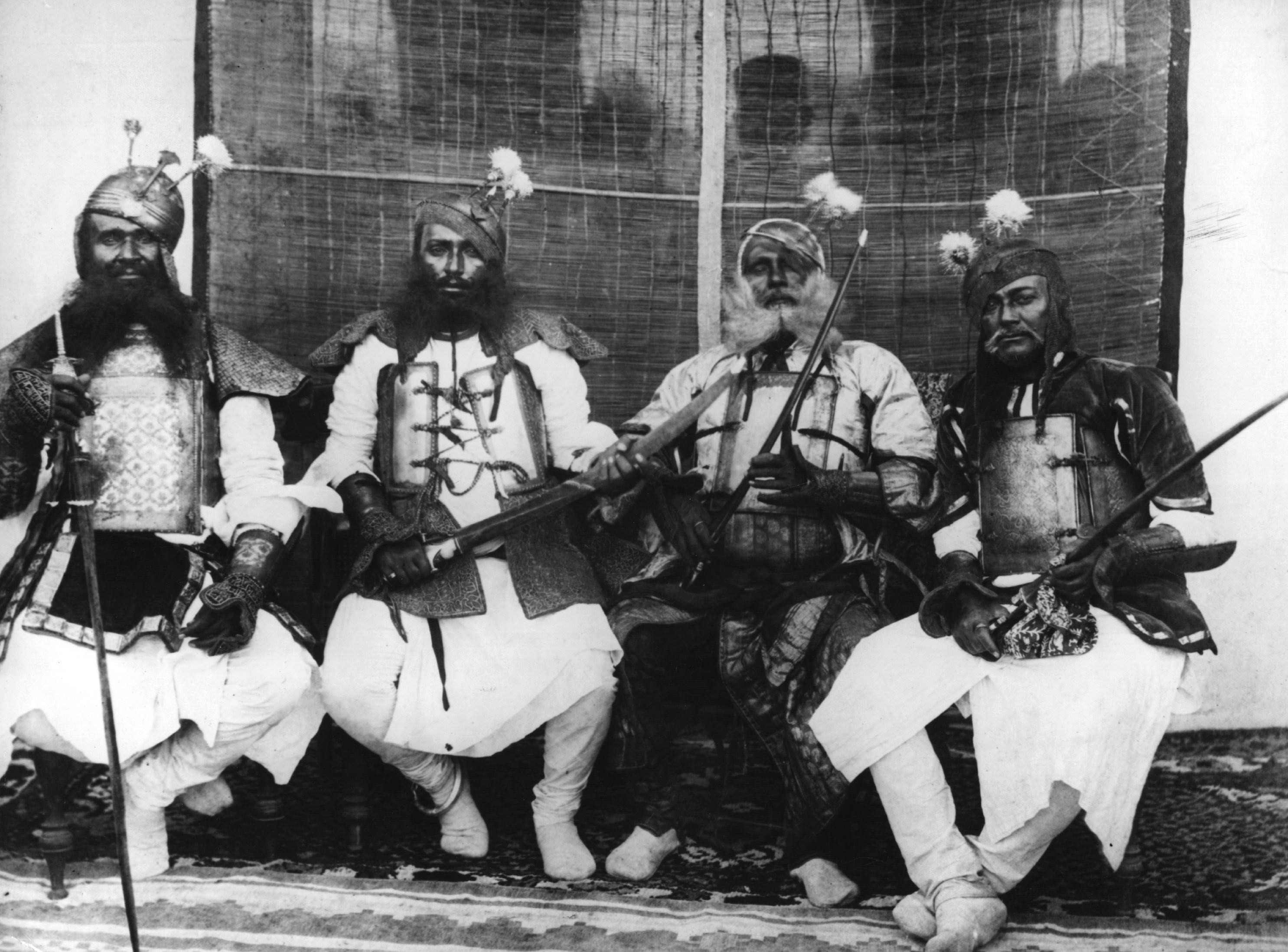
Four Indian warriors wearing char-aina, circa 1873.

Brigandines reinforced by mirror plates:

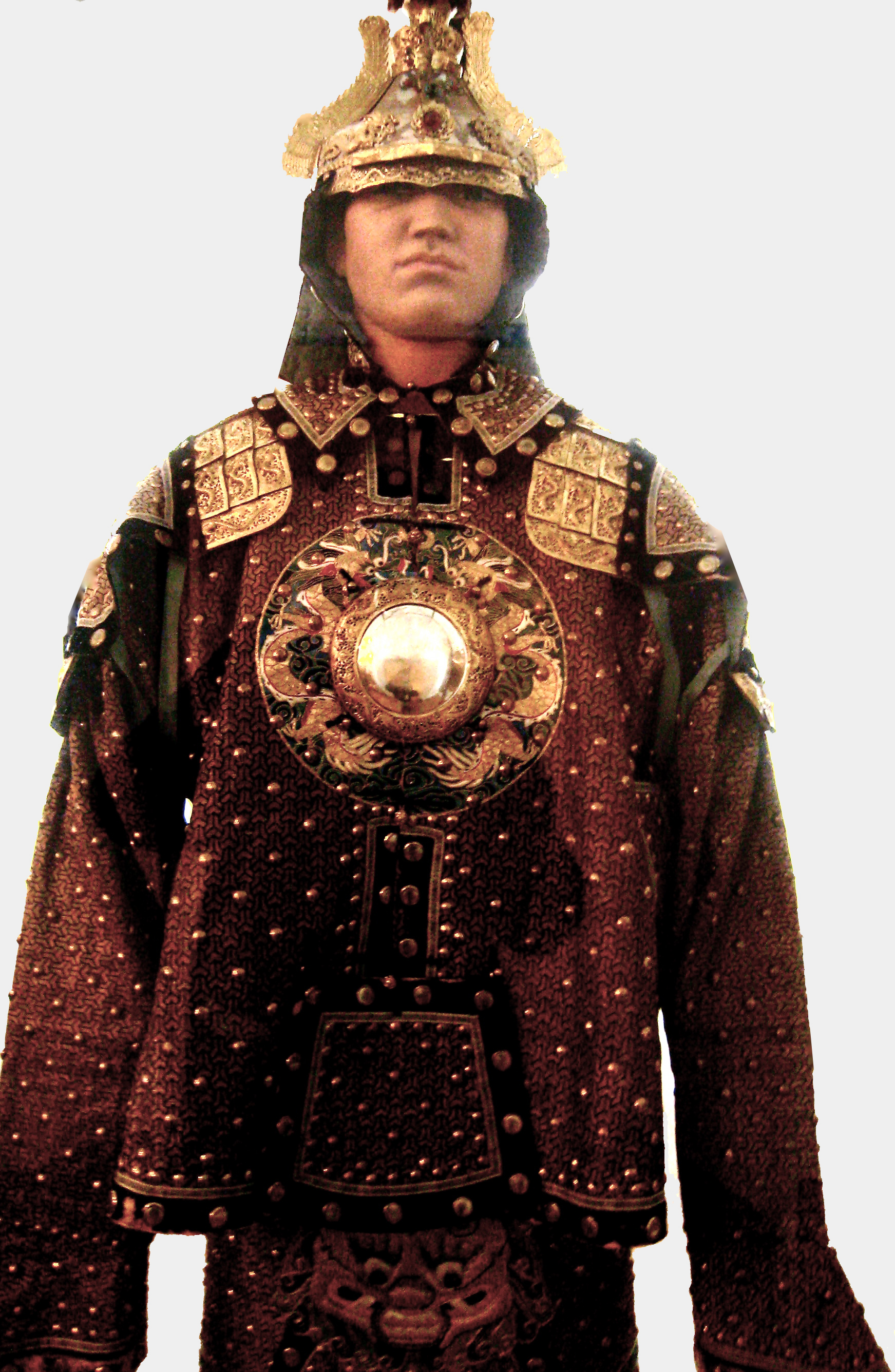
Chinese dingjia brigandine reinforced by classic round mirror.

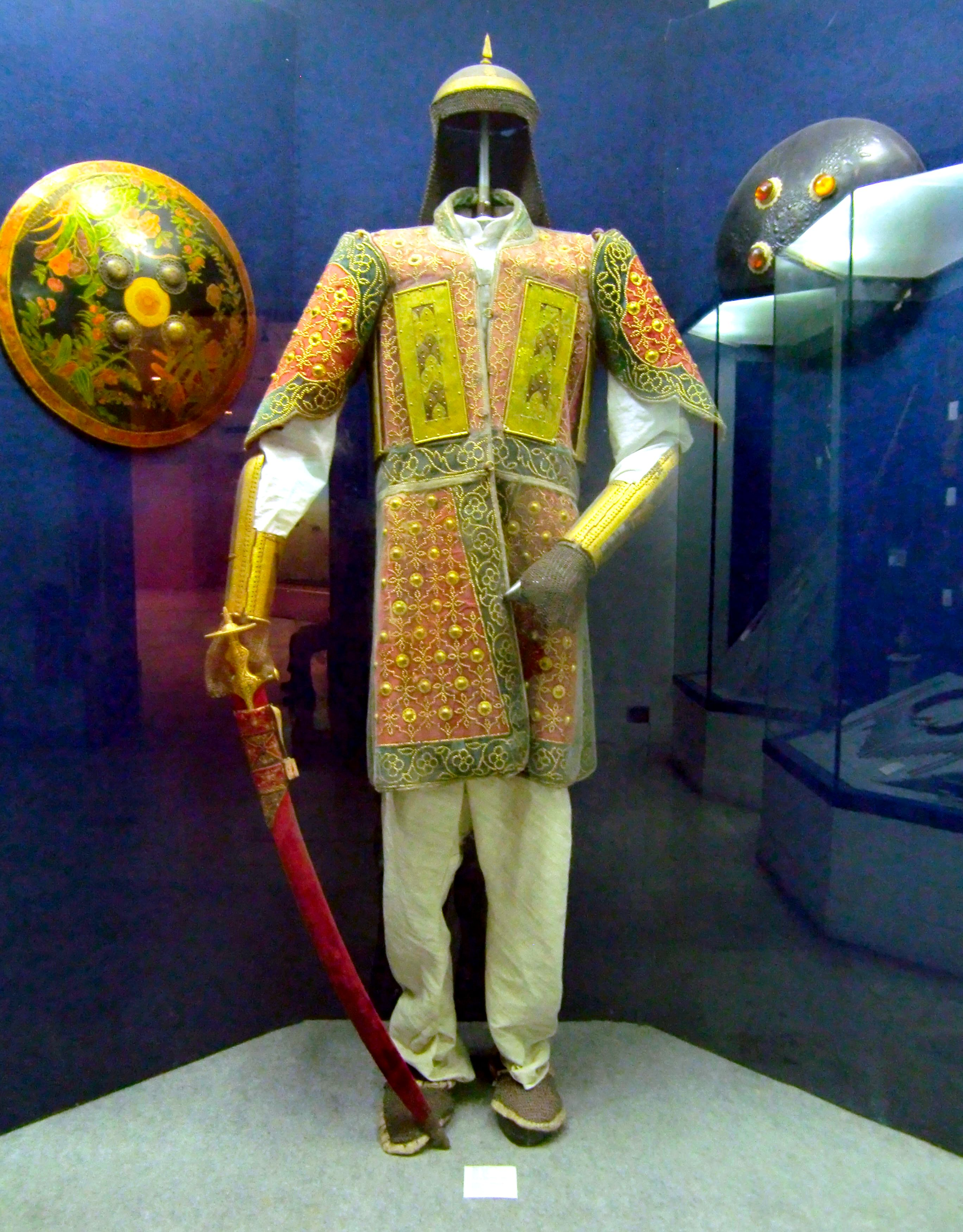
Indian brigandine reinforced by mirror plates.

Compare analogues which are not mirror armours, but have the same construction:

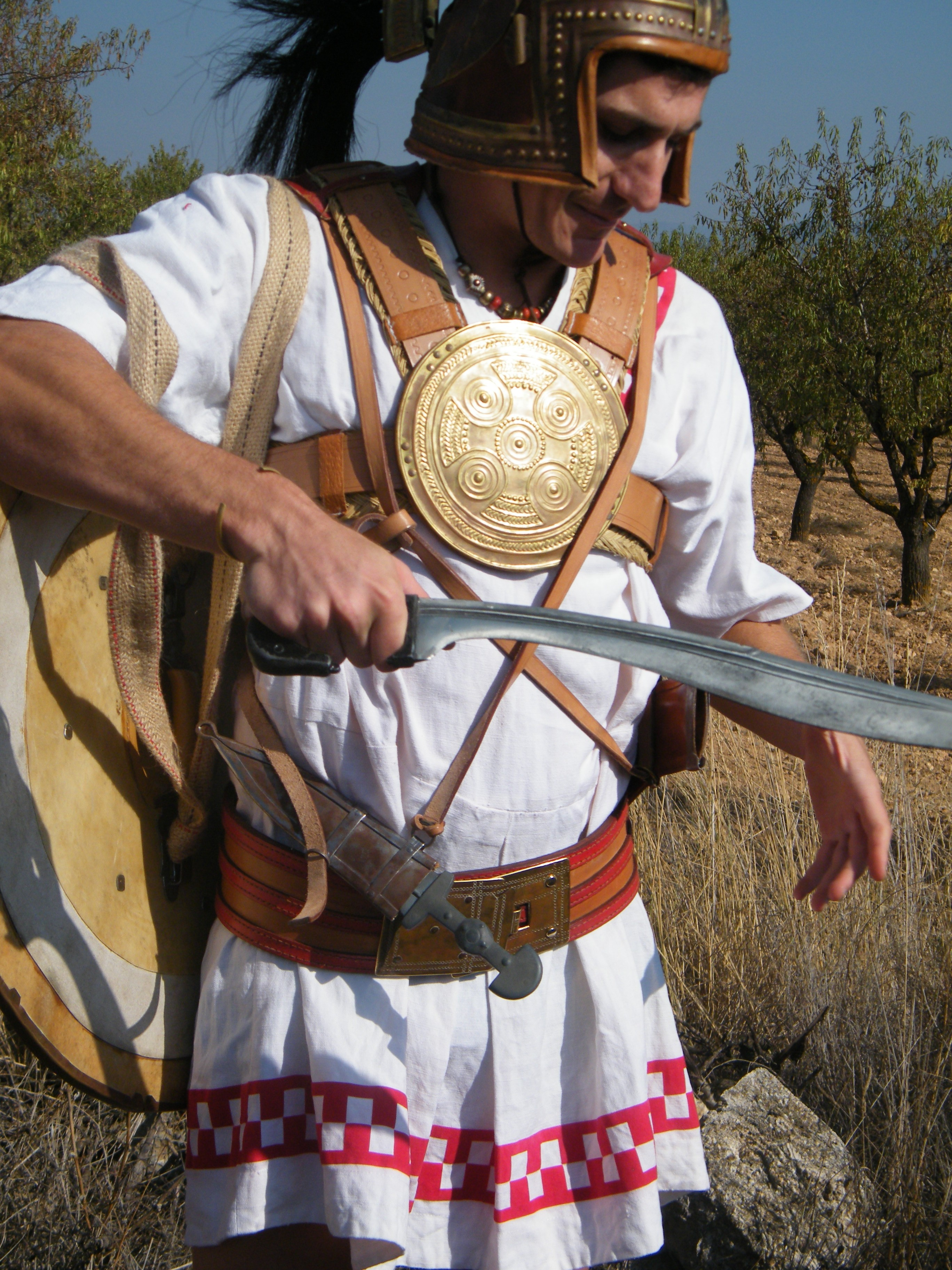
Iberian Caetratus reenactor of the 3rd Century B.C. in Kardiophylax

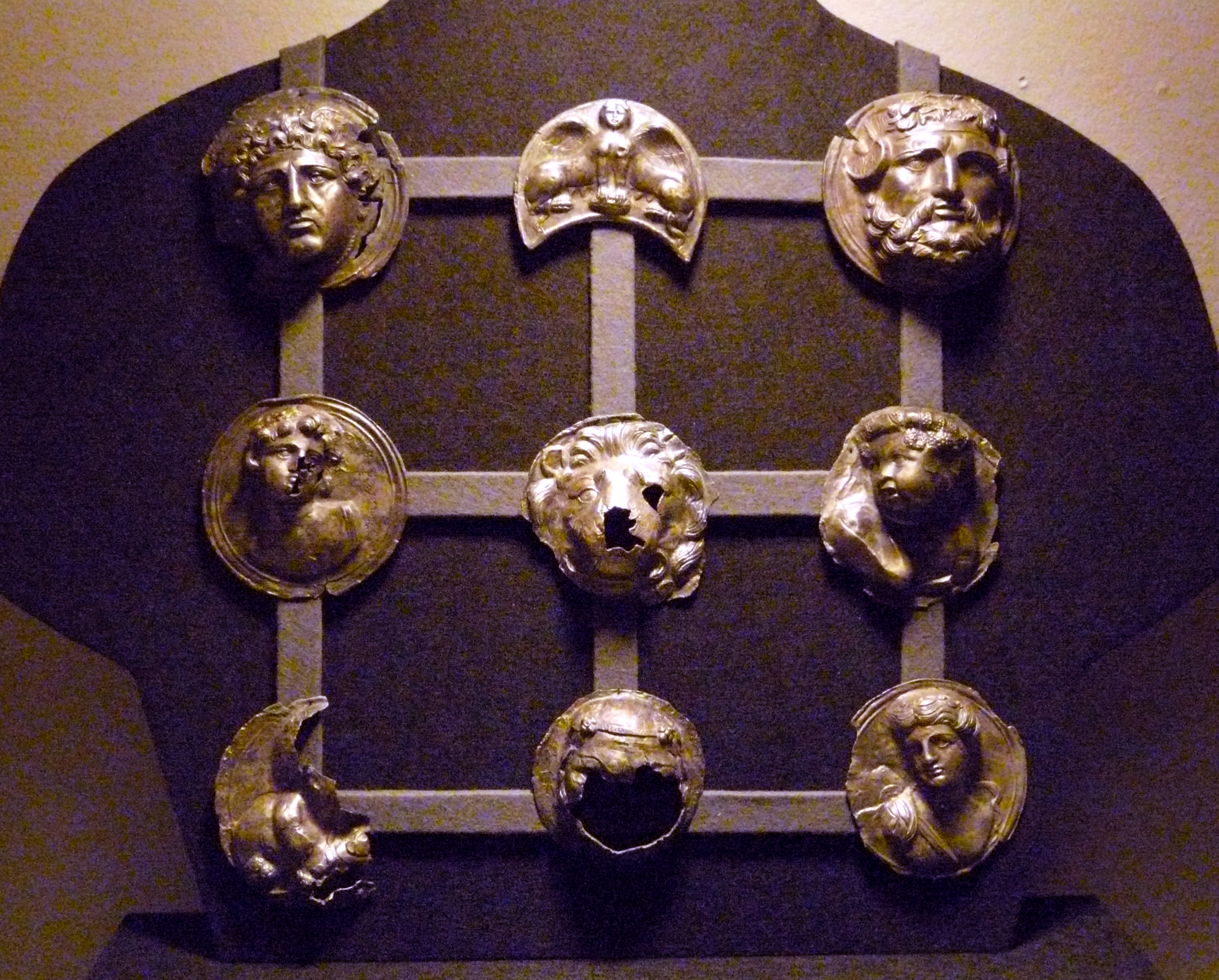
Roman phalerae

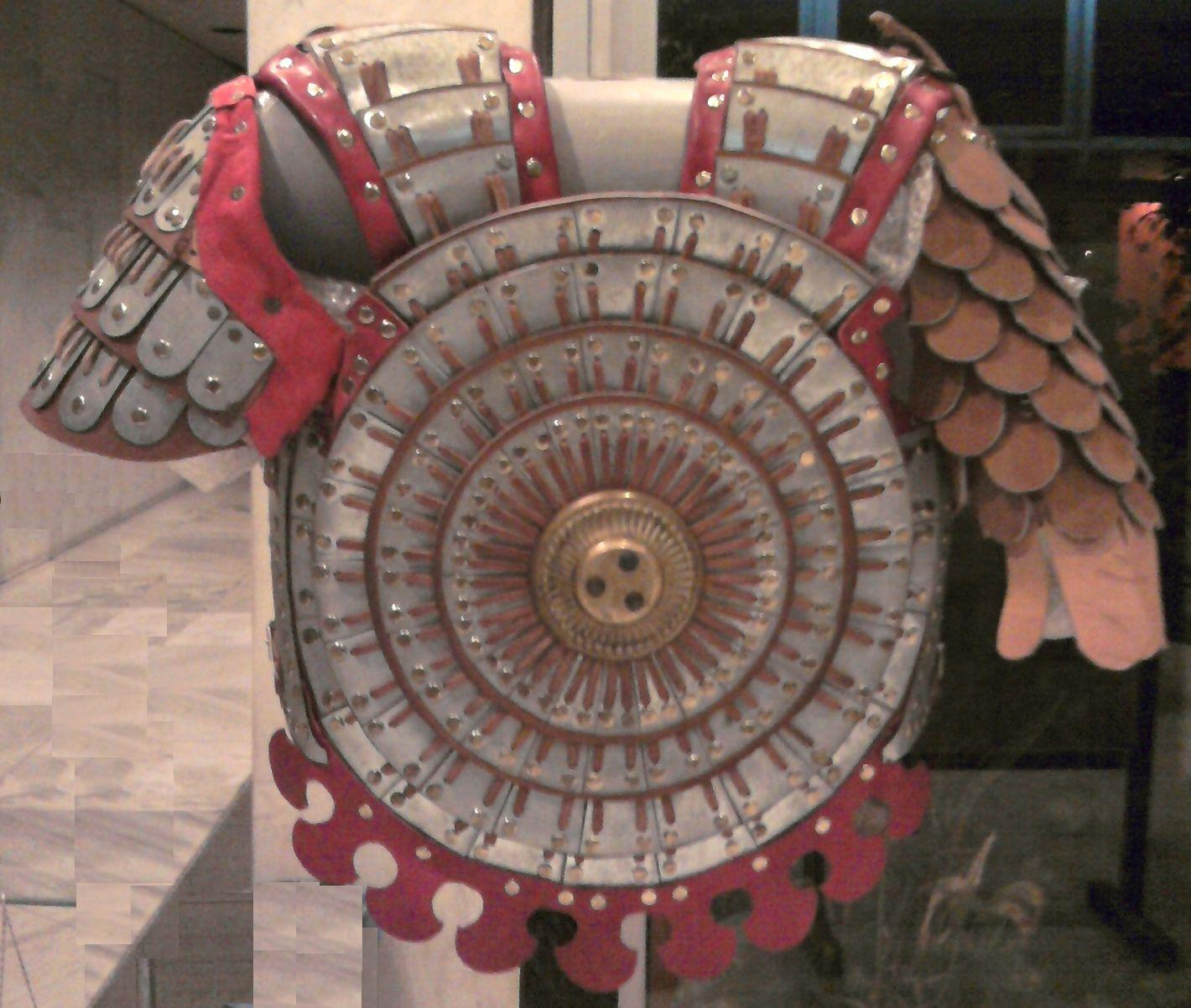
Byzantine klivanium (Κλιβάνιον)

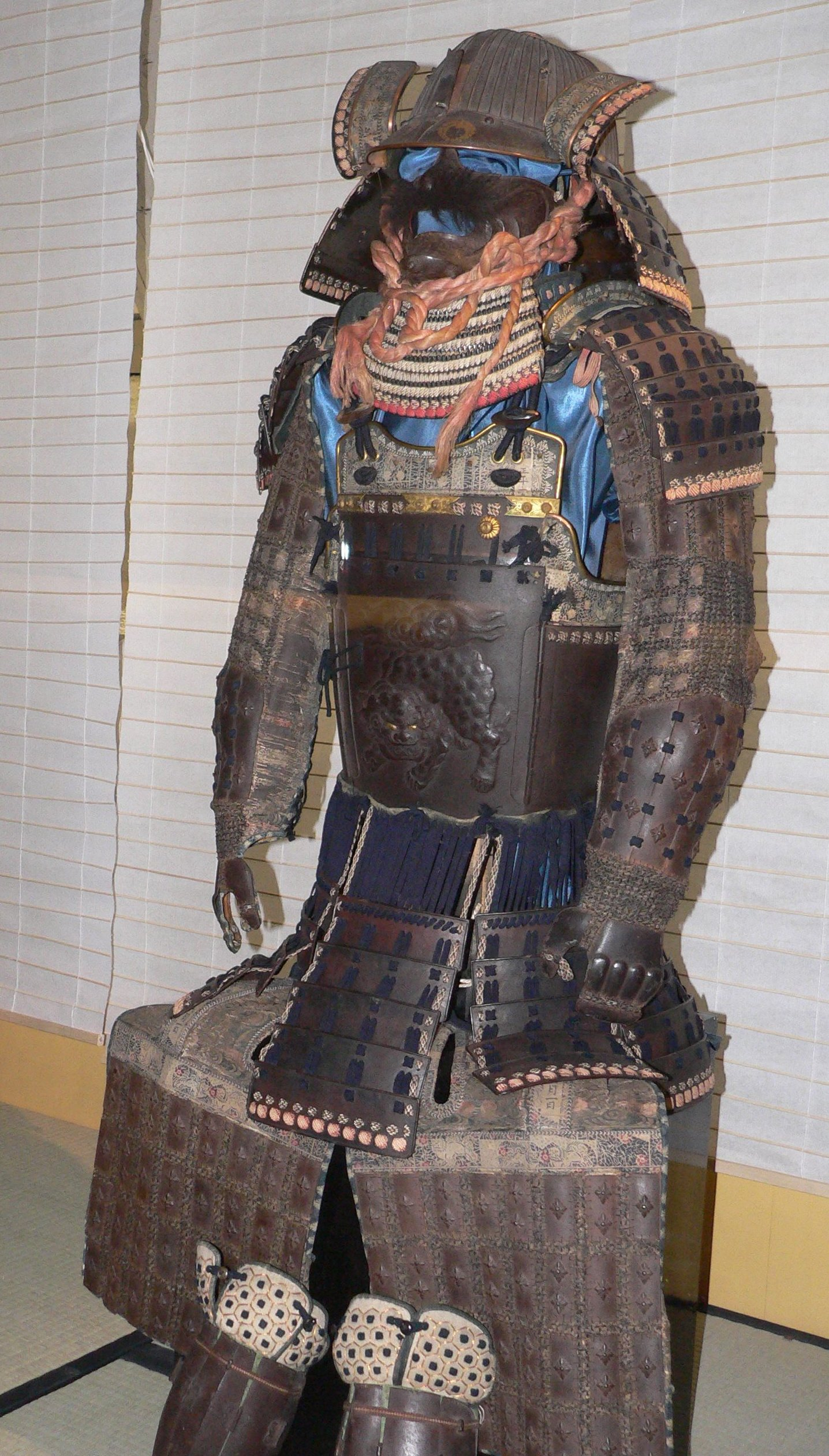
Japanese yukinoshita dō armour

== See also ==
- Mail and plate armour
- Mail (armour)
- Melong
- Toli
