= Toli (shamanism) =

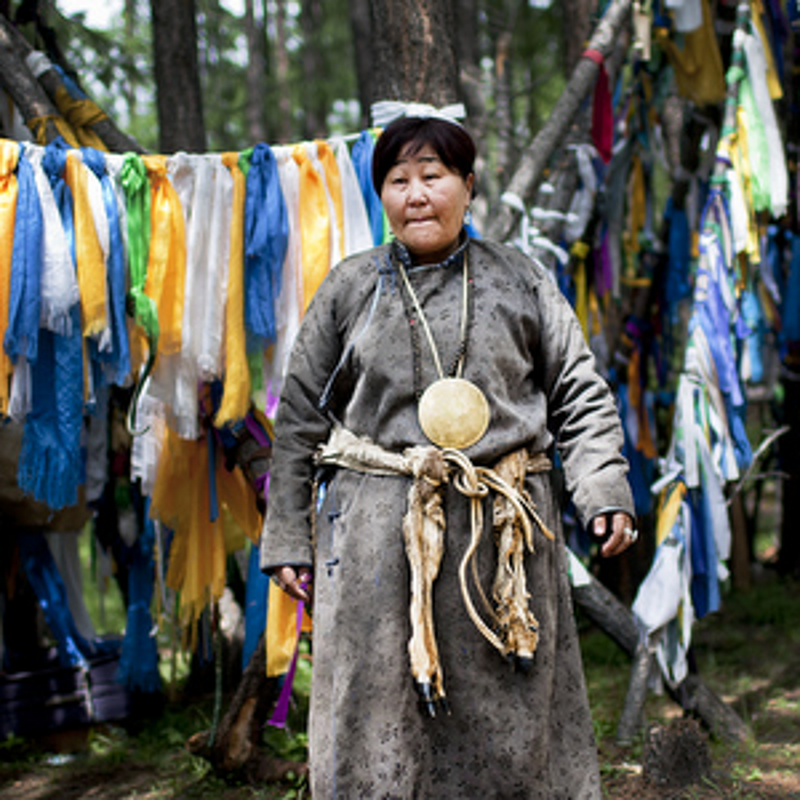
Tsaatan shaman wearing a toli hanging from her neck; Khövsgöl Province, Mongolia

A toli (Mongolian: ᠲᠣᠯᠢ, толь lit. 'mirror') is a ritual brass, copper, or bronze mirror used in shamanism in some parts of Mongolia and in the Republic of Buryatia. The mirror is typically round and ornamented on one side but polished on the other, although this may vary between regions and ethnic groups (see below).

== Description ==
Toli are traditionally worn as part of a shaman's attire around the shaman's neck, or in quantity on the shaman's deel or apron - often called their armour as these pieces of ritual clothing help to protect the shaman from hostile spirit attack. Toli may be used in different sizes: among the Daur, the front and back of the shaman's costume was covered with small toli placed like overlapping scales while the front might also feature eight large mirrors and one medium-sized mirror to protect the heart, the neker-toli, which might be plated in nickel; according to Heissig, in Hure Banner shamans wore nine mirrors, nine being a particularly meaningful number in Mongolian religion and mythology.

== Function ==
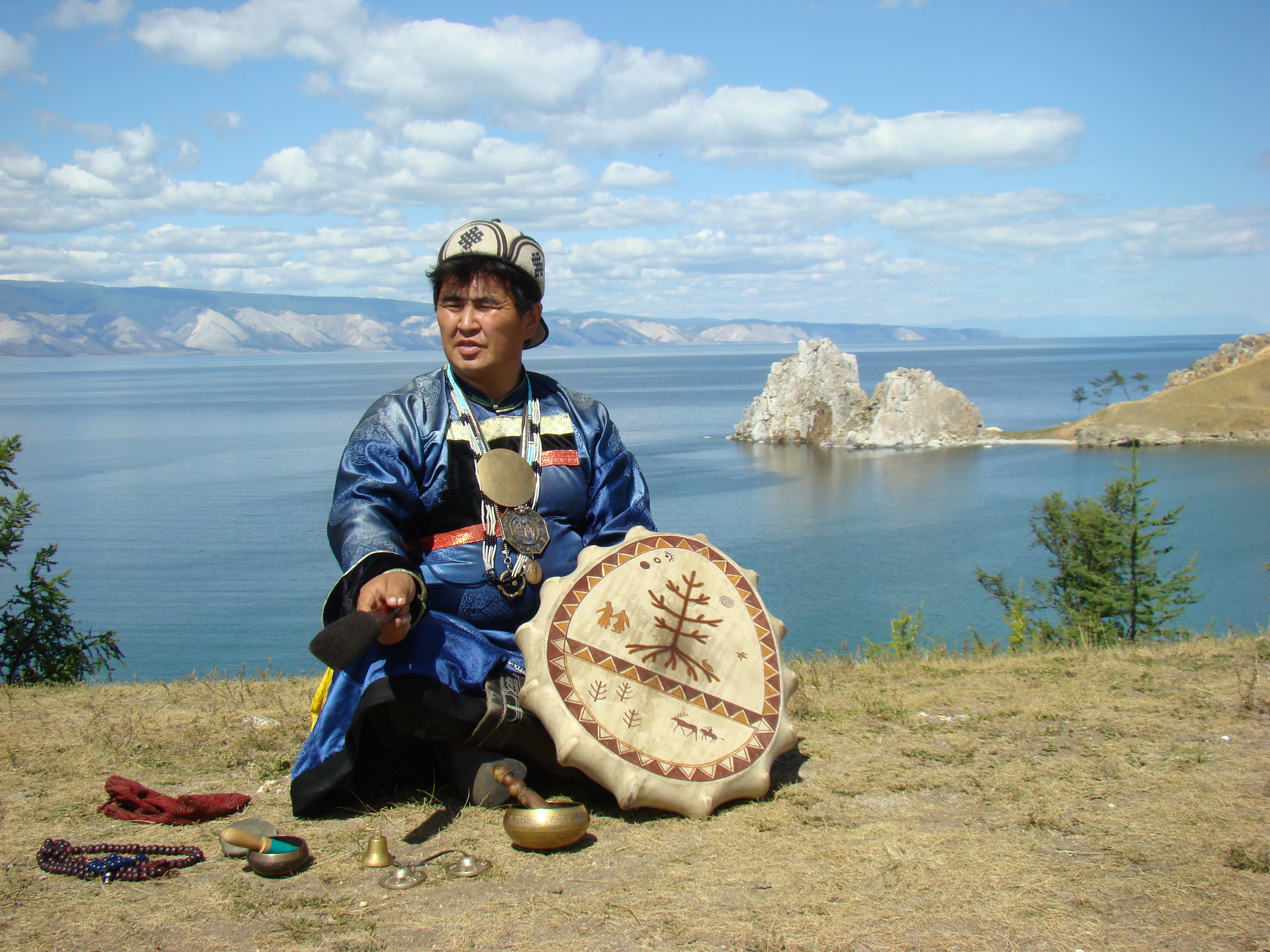
Buryat shaman wearing a toli hanging from his neck; Olkhon Island, Russia

Toli help ward off harmful or attacking spirits in their own right, and also can be thought of as an object which signifies the shaman's authority or role. Among the Daur, the number of toli collected by a Daur shaman was an indicator of their level of power.

Tolis have additional purposes as well, for example, among the Daur people and all the other shamanistic groups who use them, they are used for a variety of practices, including to purifying and empowering water or vodka, collecting and trapping hostile spirits, and providing a home for helper spirits. They also act as vessels for the shaman's spiritual power, called the 'wind horse' in Mongolia. They can also collect and store the power of blessings, or power given from the sun, moon, stars or other parts of the world, all of which can be given to a sick person, or which can be added to the shaman's own power.

Walther Heissig, describing shamans and their incantations in Hure Banner in the 1940s, remarks that a woman shaman indicated that the toli contained "the white horses of the shamans"; the mirror itself was seen as a vehicle for the shamans.

== See also ==
- Melong
- Mirror armour
- Shinju-kyo
- TLV mirror

== Bibliography ==
- DeMello, Margo (14 February 2012). Faces Around the World: A Cultural Encyclopedia of the Human Face. ABC-CLIO. ISBN 978-1-59884-617-1.
- Edson, Gary (2009). Shamanism: A Cross-Cultural Study of Beliefs and Practices. McFarland. ISBN 978-0-7864-3409-1.
- Heissig, Walther (1944). "Schamanen und Geisterbeschwörer im Küriye-Banner". Folklore Studies. 3 (1): 39–71.
- Hoppál, Mihály; International Society for Shamanistic Research (2000). Shaman traditions in transition. International Society for Shamanistic Research.
- Tedlock, Barbara (27 December 2005). The Woman in the Shaman's Body: Reclaiming the Feminine in Religion and Medicine. Random House Digital, Inc. ISBN 978-0-553-37971-6.
