= Phalera (military decoration) =

Roman sculpted disk

A phalera (pl. phalerae) was a sculpted disk, usually made of gold, silver, bronze or glass, and worn on the breastplate during parades by Roman soldiers who had been awarded it as a kind of medal. Roman military units could also be awarded phalerae for distinguished conduct in action. These awards were often mounted on the staffs of the unit's standards. The term also refers to disks crafted by the continental Celts for religious and ornamental purposes, especially those used on equestrian gear.

== Gallery ==
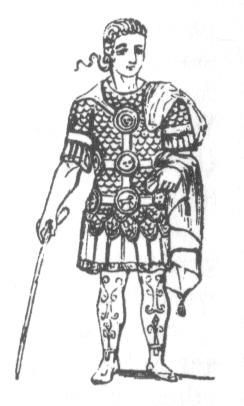
A soldier with seven phalerae

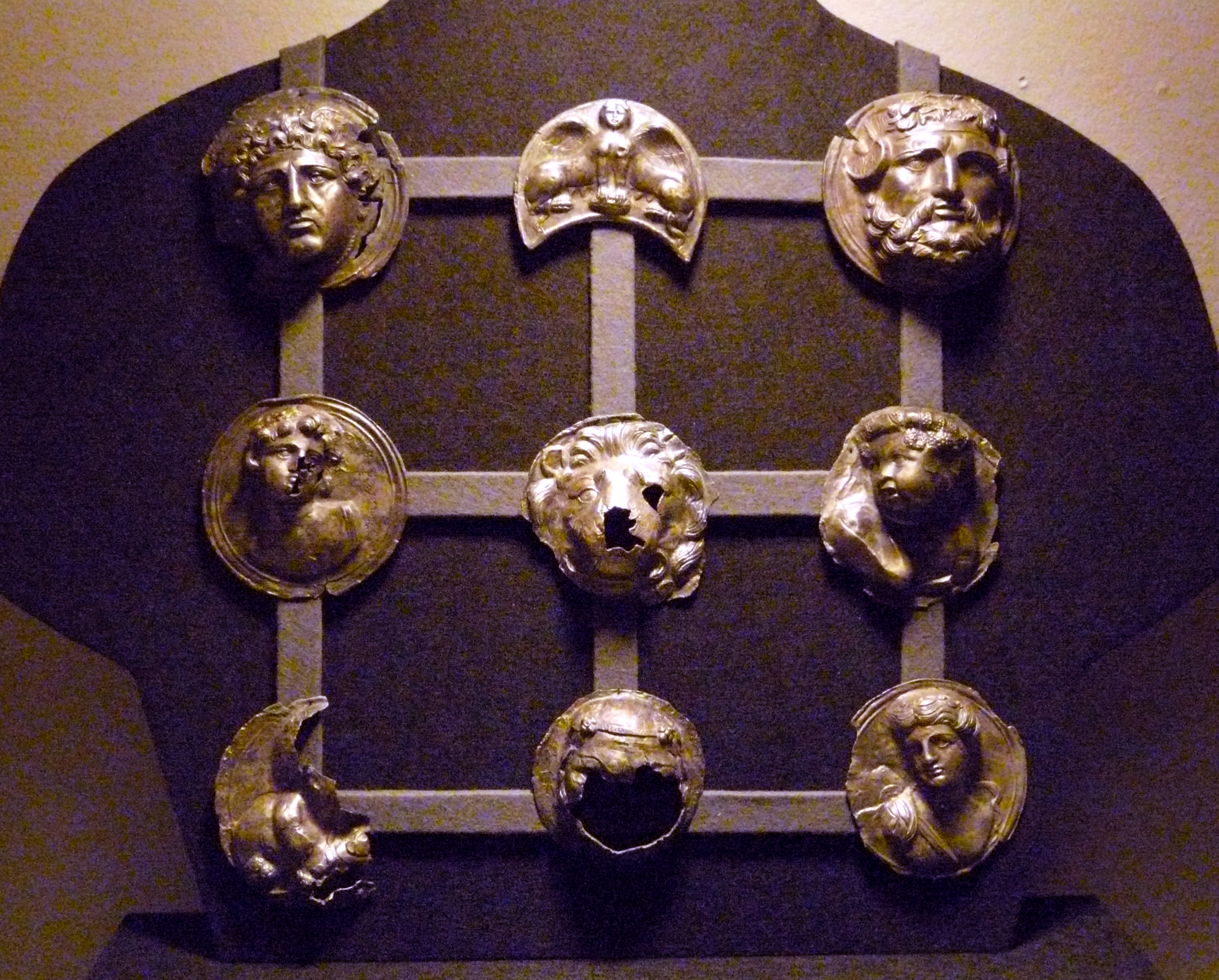
Lauersfort Phalera, Burg Linn Museum Center, Krefeld, Germany

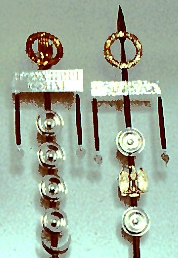
Roman military unit standards with phalerae

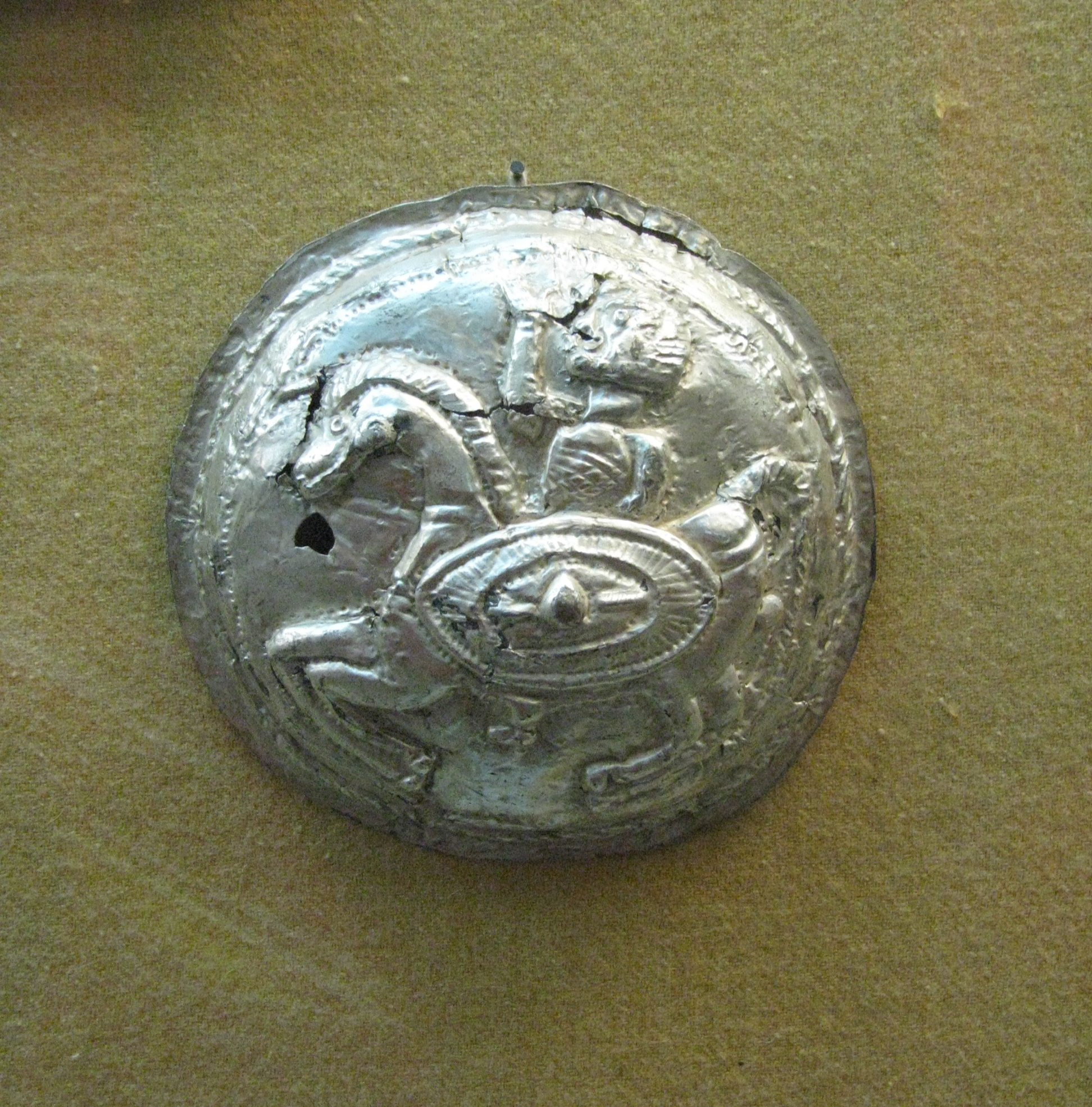
Circular Dacian phalera having the representation of a horseman with shield

== See also ==
- Roman military decorations and punishments
- Mirror armour – similar Asian and Eatern European armour
