= Besagew =

Circular piece of armor to protect the inside of a joint

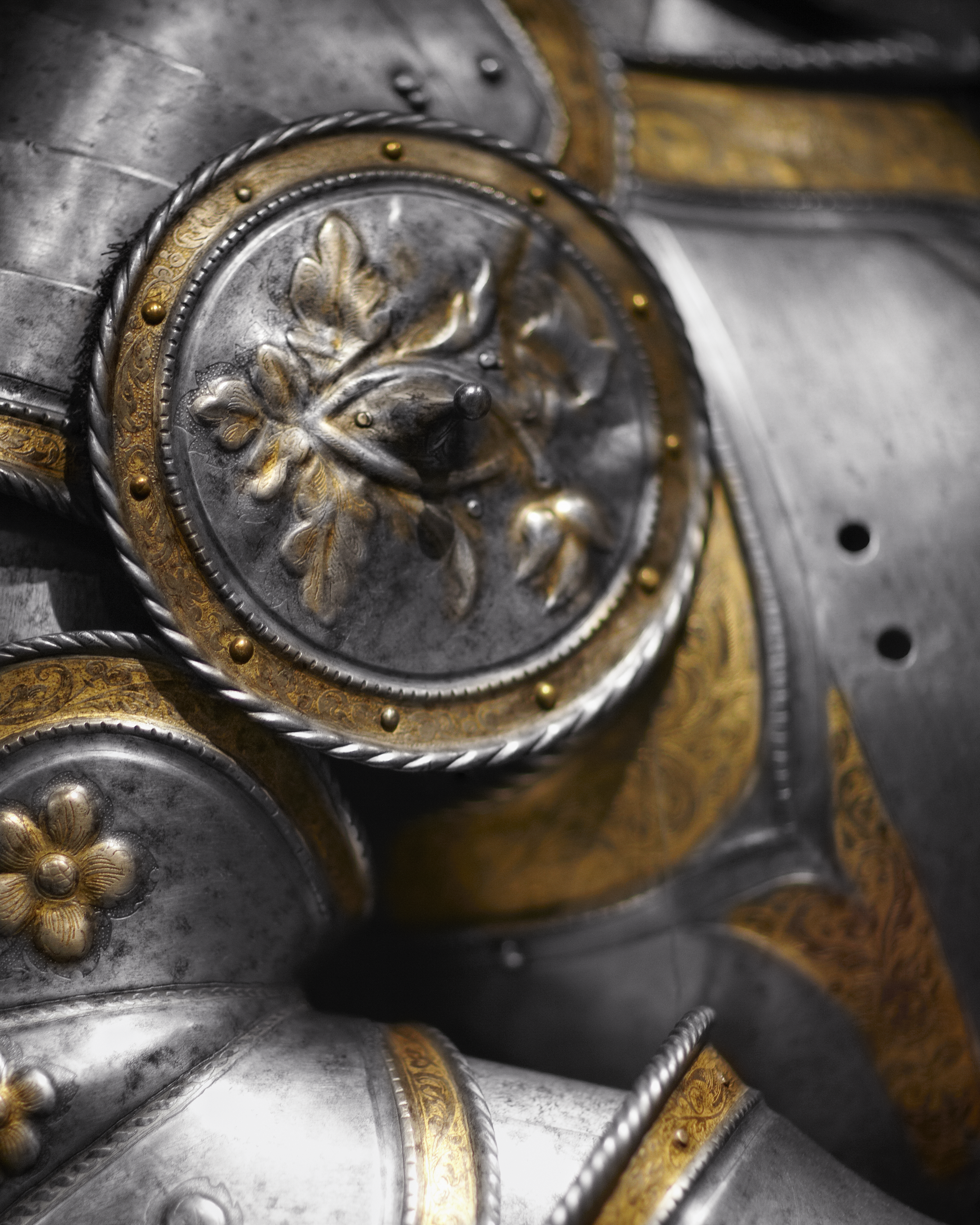
Detail from Gustav Vasa's armour 1540

Armour displaying besagues (full image)

Besagews, also spelled besagues, are a type of rondel designed to protect the armpits, as part of a harness of plate armour. The armpits are the location of the axillary arteries, and protecting them was therefore vital. Armour without besagues might employ larger shoulder defenses, such as winged pauldrons, or simply leave the mail beneath exposed.
