= Melong =

Tibetan term

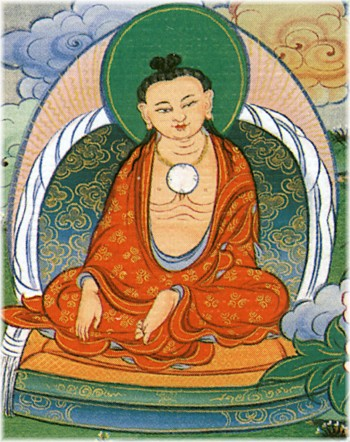
Drubthob Melong Dorje (1243-1303), a lineage holder of the Vima Nyingtik, depicted wearing a mirror hanging from his neck

Melong (Tibetan: མེ་ལོང, Wylie: me long; Sanskrit: ādarśa, darpaṇa) is a Tibetan term that means "mirror", "looking glass". The melong is a polyvalent symbol, divine attribute, and quality of the enlightened mindstream or bodhicitta.

== Meaning and significance ==
The mirror is an ancient symbol throughout Indian religions. In Tibetan iconography it may be understood as a symbol of emptiness (Śūnyatā) and pure (ka dag) consciousness. The mirror is often depicted as an accoutrement (Note: Accoutrement is herein employed in the sense of its etymon: refer, accoutrement.) of the hagiographical signification of fully-realised mahasiddha, dzogchenpa, and mahamudra sadhaka. The mirror may be understood as a quality of the mindstream that denotes perceiving experience as it is without obscuration formed by klesha.

=== Mahayana ===
The mirror is part of the iconography of Akshobhya, one of the Five Tathagatas, who is the embodiment of "Mirror-like Awareness" (Sanskrit: ādarśa-jñāna, which is "devoid of all dualistic thought and ever united with its 'content' as a mirror is with its reflections"; (Note: Ādarśa is Sanskrit for "mirror", the term may be parsed into the etymon of darśana with a grammatical adposition.) This type of wisdom is a transformation of the eighth consciousness, the Alayavijnana.

=== Vajrayana ===
The mirror may be engaged in the advanced Tantric sadhana of the gyulü. As the mirror, so the mind. The mirror as the mind, following Yogacara, reflects quality and form, though it is not directly altered and is 'beyond all attributes and qualities' (nirguna).

In an essay accompanying the curatorial notes of an exhibition for the c. 19th-century xylograph on silk entitled Offerings to Mahakala, which depicts an 'array of ritual offerings' (Note: The 'array of ritual offerings' should be understood to be within the genre of gyan tshok ("host of ornaments") or kangja ("materials for the banquet"). The "banquet" being the ganacakra.) to the dharmapala Mahakala, Sawyer notes the importance of 'mirror' iconography to the dharmakaya:

The looking glass/mirror (T. me-long, Skt. adarsa), which represents the dharmakaya or Truth Body, having the aspects of purity (a mirror is clear of pollution) and wisdom (a mirror reflects all phenomena without distinction).

=== Dzogchen ===
The mirror motif is pervasive throughout Buddhist literature and is important to traditions of Dzogchen, representing the ground or base. Namkhai Norbu (1938–2018) writes that the term base denotes "the fundamental ground of existence, both at the universal level and at the level of the individual, the two being essentially the same." This base is "uncreated, ever pure and, self-perfected, it is not something that has to be constructed," however it "remains hidden to the experience of every being affected by the illusion of dualism." Jean Luc-Achard defines the basis as "the actual, authentic abiding mode of the Mind." According to Achard, Dzogchen tantras define the basis as "Great Primordial Purity" (ka dag chen po). The Tantra of the Beautiful Auspiciousness (bKra shis mdzes ldan gyi rgyud) defines this as "the state abiding before authentic Buddhas arose and before impure sentient beings appeared."

Namkhai Norbu relates that the metaphor of the mirror reflects the trifold nature of the base:

- The essence, or 'fundamental voidness' of the base, which cannot be changed, just as a mirror is not changed by the reflections it enfolds;
- The nature of the base is 'to manifest', just as a mirror must reflect whatever is before it, without judging the content;
- The energy of the base, or dang, refers to how the 'world around us' arises due to the delusion known as 'karmic vision'; just as a mirror faithfully reflects any content, dang "has the capacity to adopt any form".

A number of texts use the mirror motif in their title, such as The Mirror of the Heart of Vajrasattva (Tibetan: རྡོ་རྗེ་སེམས་དཔའ་སྙིང་གི་མེ་ལོང, Wylie: rdo rje sems dpa' snying gi me long) which is one of the Seventeen Tantras of the Upadesha.

== See also ==
- Mandarava § Iconography
- Mirror armour – Type of cuirass (armour)
- Saraswati § In Indo-Tibetan Buddhism
- Toli
