= Pauldron =

Plate armor for the shoulder and upper arms

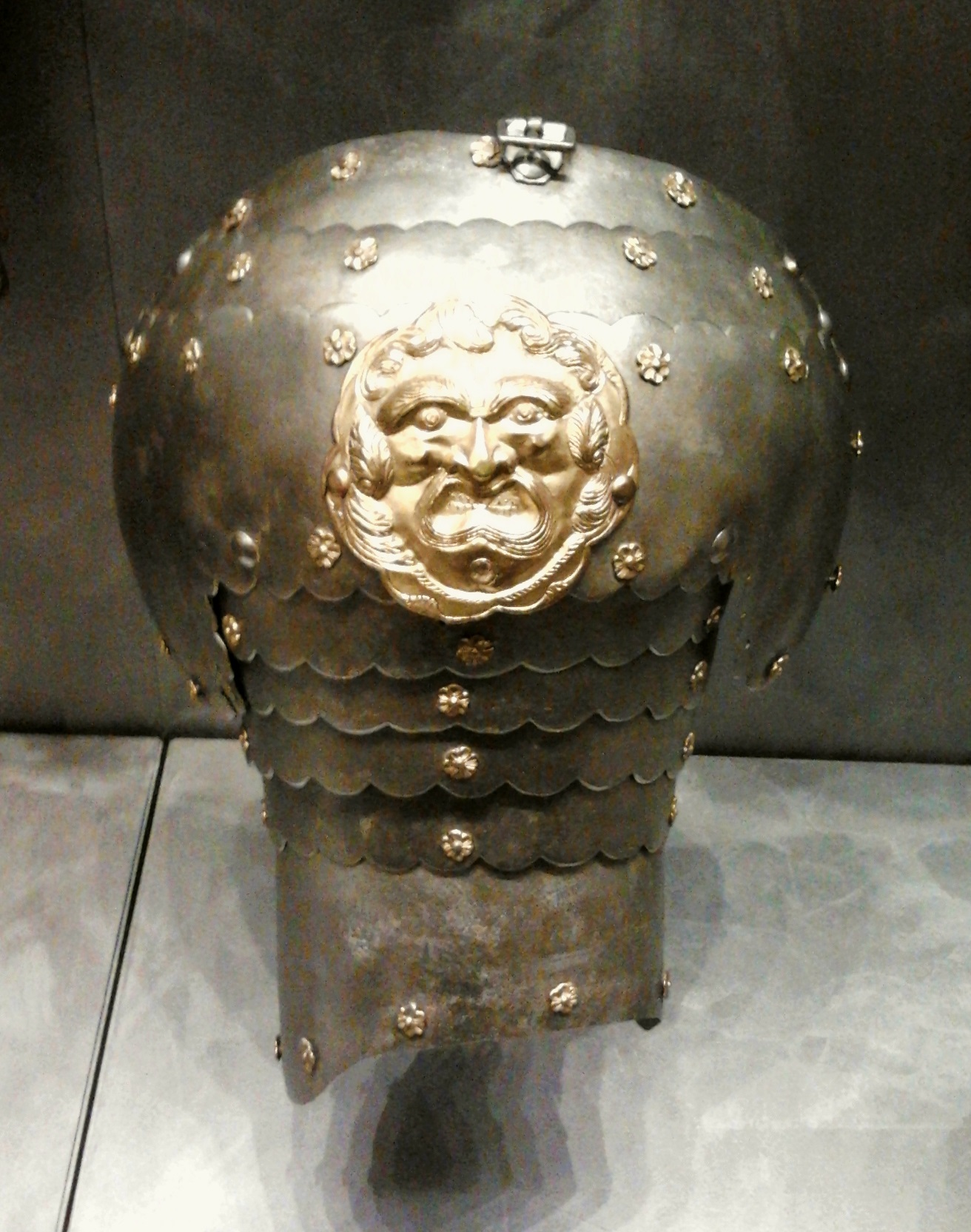
Right pauldron of hussar's armor, 17th century, District Museum in Tarnów

A pauldron (sometimes spelled pouldron or powldron) is a component of plate armor that evolved from spaulders in the 15th century. As with spaulders, pauldrons cover the shoulder area. Pauldrons tend to be larger than spaulders, covering the armpit and sometimes parts of the back and chest. A pauldron typically consists of a single large dome-shaped piece to cover the shoulder (the "cop") with multiple lames attached to it to defend the arm and upper shoulder. On some suits of armour, especially those of Italian design, the pauldrons would be asymmetrical, with one pauldron covering less (for mobility) and sporting a cut-away to make room for a lance rest.

== Jousting ==
The pauldron of a knight was also important in jousts. While most points in a jousting competition were scored by unhorsing the opponent or striking the lance, points could also be scored if a lance was to hit the enemy pauldron, albeit for lesser points than a true strike. Many pauldron styles used a lance rest to assist in the joust, allowing the knight an area to ready the lance for stronger blows. The pauldron would typically be cut shorter to allow this rest without restricting arm mobility or the rider's protection. Typically, only the right pauldron would support this cut-away, as this was the lance arm of the knights contending in a joust.

Typical tournament armor for jousting would be padded with cloth to minimize injury from an opponent's lance and prevent the metal of the pauldron from scraping against the breastplate. This protective cloth padding would extend about half an inch from the rolled edge of the armor, and it was secured in place with rivets along the entire edge. This cloth protection could not be too thick in battle, or the knight would have no arm mobility. However, in a safer tournament setting, mobility was less important compared to safety, thus leading to heavier padding. In fact, knights in this era could be padded to the point where they look "more wide than tall" compared to contemporary depictions of jousting armor.

== In fantasy fiction ==
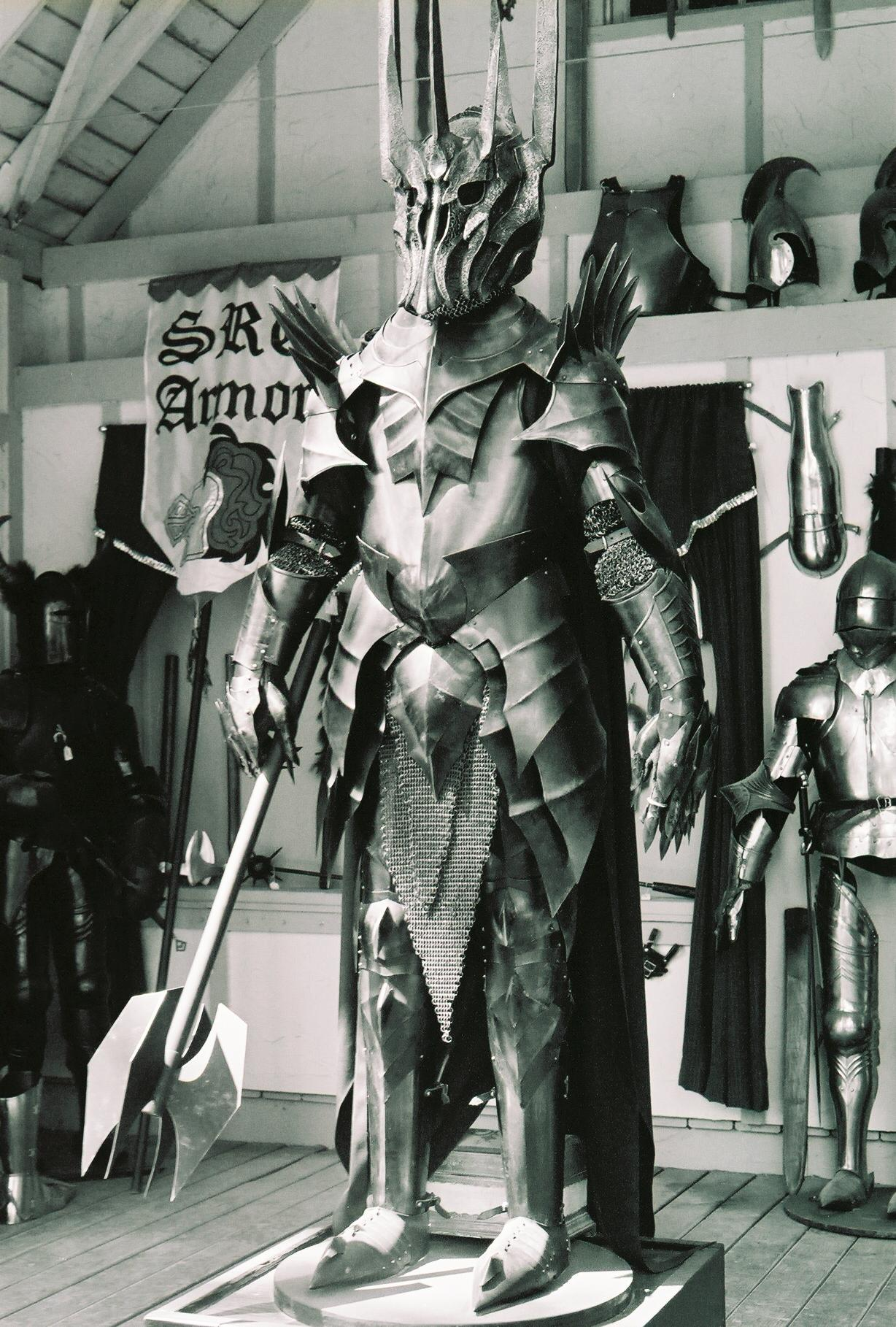
Replica of fantasy armor worn by Sauron, featuring pauldrons with large spikes

In visual artwork inspired by fantasy fiction, pauldrons are often depicted with spikes. Such a feature would be impractical in combat, as performing any action that requires raising an arm risks a spike poking the wearer in the head.

An example of this style of pauldron can be seen in the armor worn by Sauron in the Lord of the Rings film trilogy.
