= Breastplate =

Type of armor that protects the front of the torso

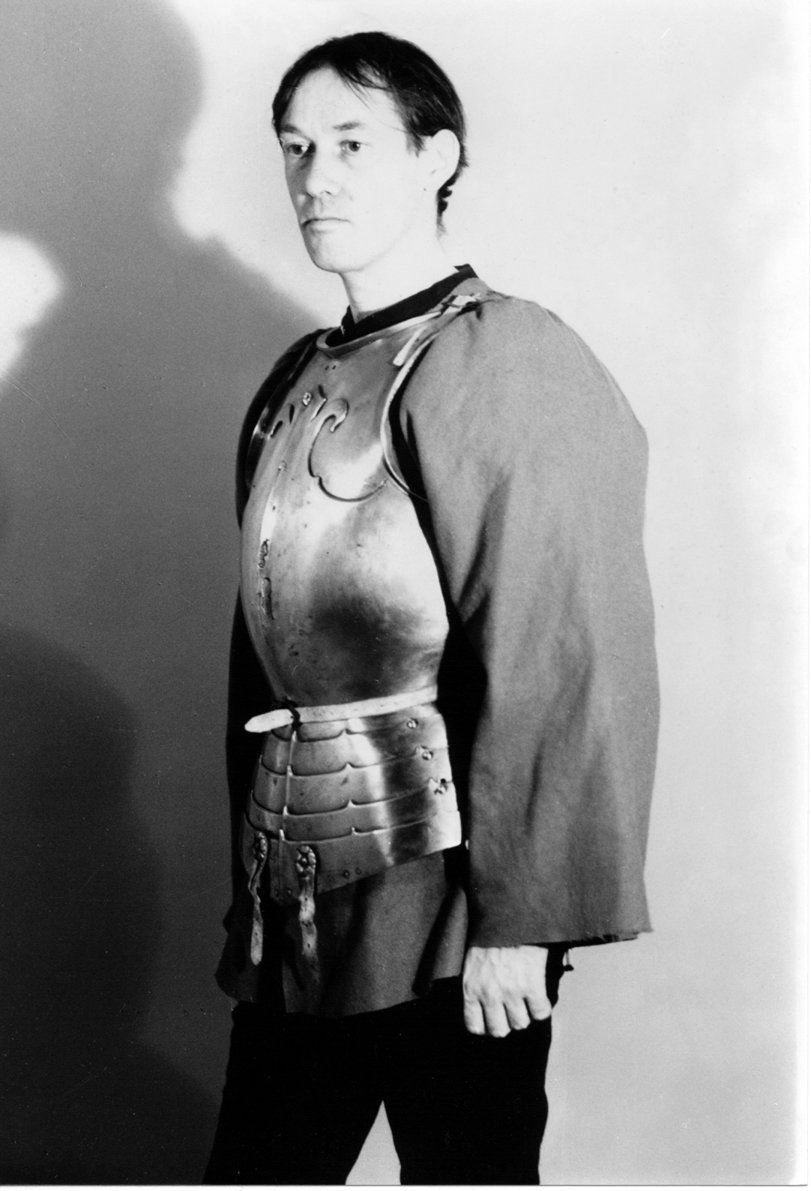
A 15th-century Gothic breastplate, with belts hanging below the fauld for the attachment of tassets

A breastplate or chestplate is a device worn over the torso to protect it from injury, as an item of religious significance, or as an item of status.

== European ==
In medieval weaponry, the breastplate is the front portion of plate armour covering the torso. It has been a military mainstay since ancient times and was usually made of leather, bronze or iron in antiquity. By around 1000 AD, solid plates had fallen out of use in Europe and knights of the period were wearing mail in the form of a hauberk over a padded tunic. Plates protecting the torso reappeared in the 1220s as plates directly attached to a knightly garment known as the surcoat. Around 1250 this developed into the coat of plates which continued to be in use for about a century. True breastplates reappear in Europe in 1340 first composed of wrought iron and later of steel. These early breastplates were made of several plates and only covered the upper torso with the lower torso not being protected by plate until the development of the fauld around 1370. They were between 1–2.5 mm (0.039–0.098 in) in thickness. In order to prevent the wearer from being cut by their own armour, the design featured outward-turned edges; these also increased the armour's stiffness. In some cases, further strength was added by a ridge running down through the centre of the plate. The first evidence for one-piece breastplates is from an altarpiece in the Pistoia cathedral dated to 1365. Complete, lightweight, one or two-piece breastplates were readily used by the first decade of the 15th century. The French term pancier, which became English pauncher and German panzer, was also used.

Sometime between 1600 and 1650 a form of breastplate was developed that consisted of two plates in close contact. This was meant to improve protection against bullets and has been described as duplex armour.

Especially thick breastplates were developed for sappers and cuirassiers in siege warfare.

Bullet-proof vests are the modern descendant of the breastplate.

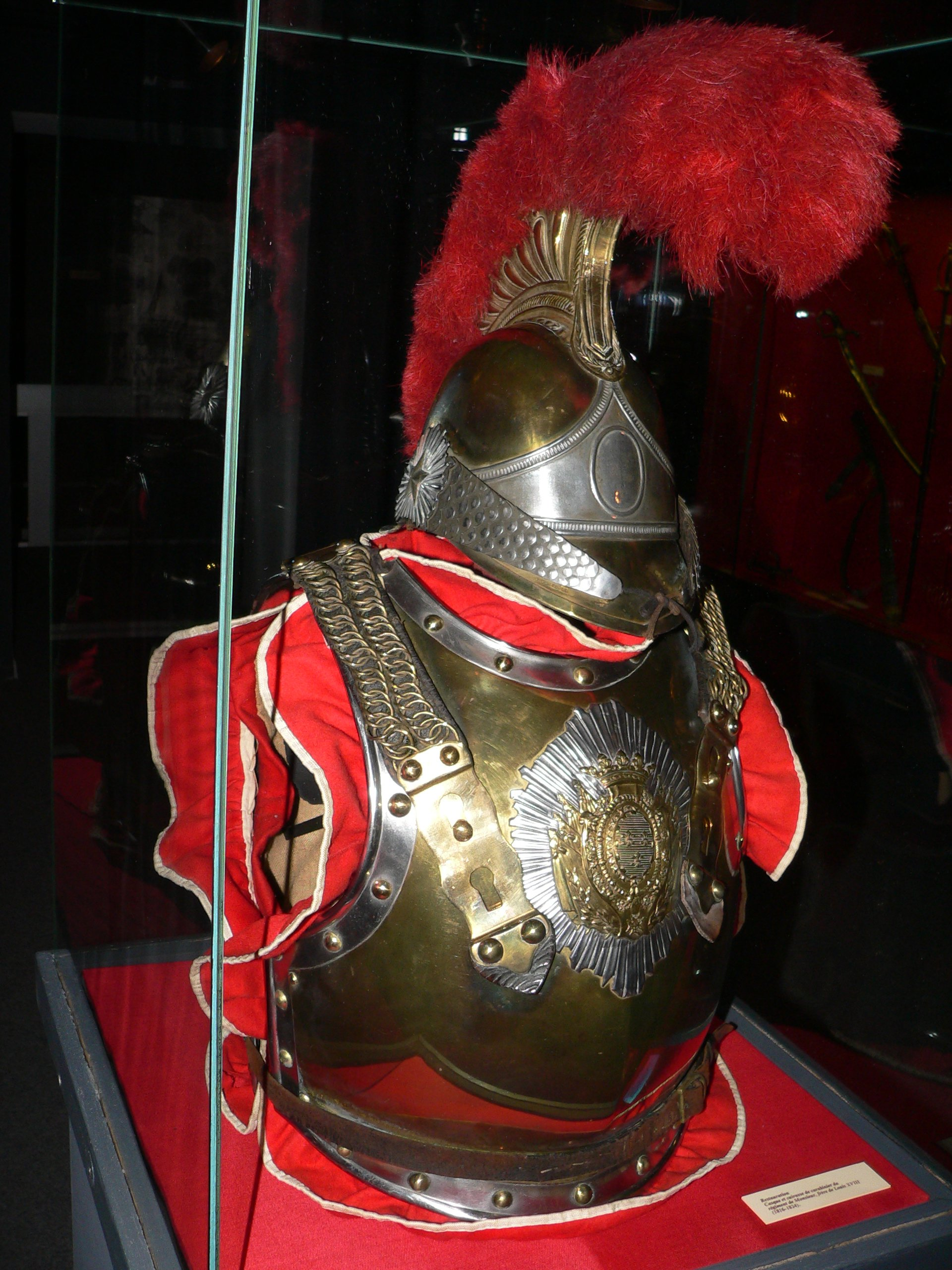
Breastplate and helmet of the French Horse Carabinier, during the Bourbon Restoration (1816–1824)

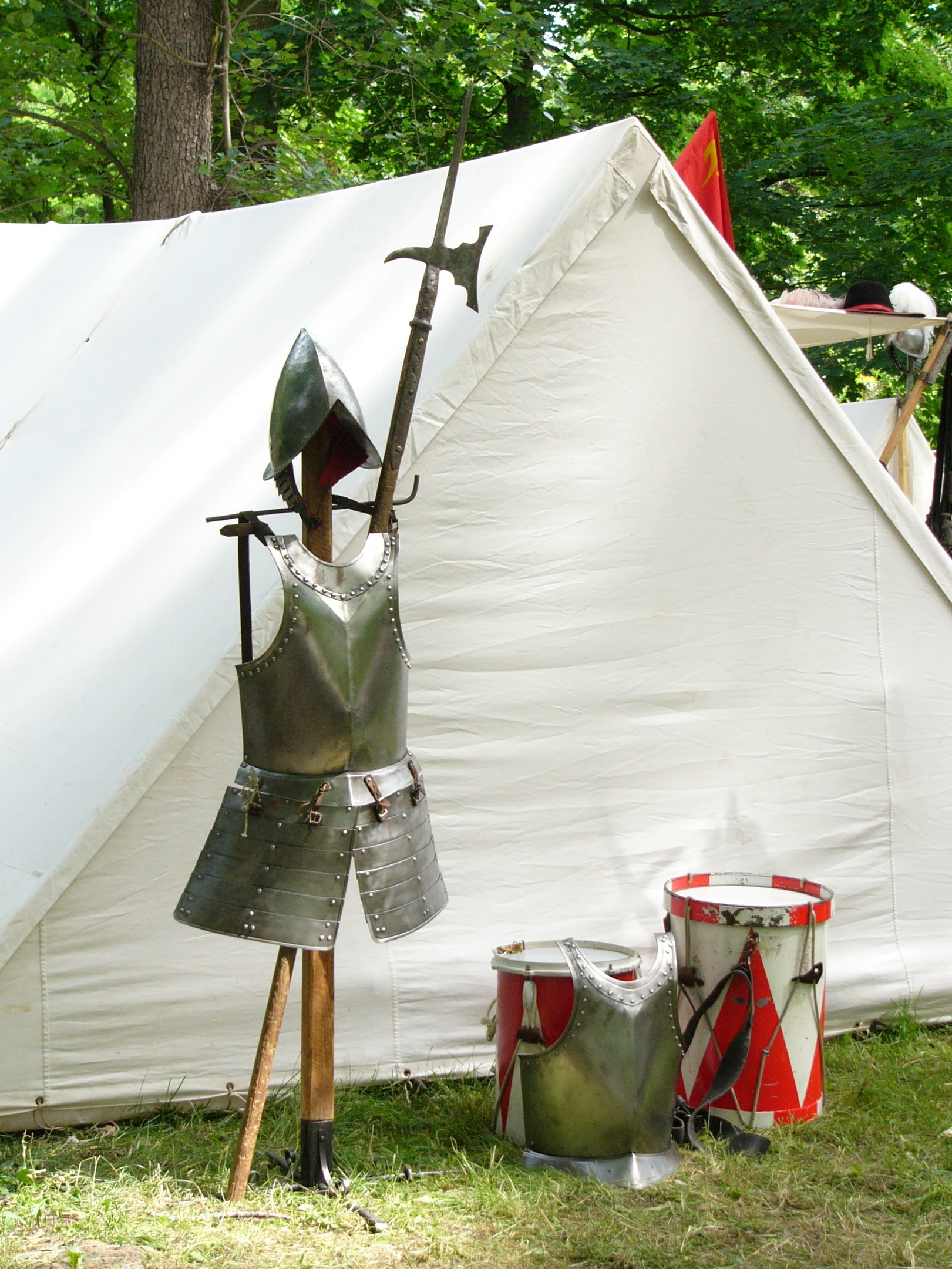
New-made replicas of a 17th-century helmet, two breastplates, tassets, a halberd, and two military marching drums

=== Classical mythology ===
Both Zeus and Athena are sometimes depicted as wearing a goatskin shield or breastplate called an Aegis. At the center of Athena’s shield was the head of Medusa.

== Asian ==
The 14th century Majapahit Empire manufactured breastplate, called karambalangan. The most notable people using this type of breastplate is Gajah Mada, which is reported by Sundanese patih as wearing golden embossed karambalangan, armed with gold-layered spear, and with a shield full of diamond decoration. In Kidung Sunda canto 2 stanza 85 it is explained that the mantris (ministers or officers) of Gajah Mada wore armor in the form of chain mail or breastplate with gold decoration and dressed in yellow attire.

=== Bible ===
According to the biblical Book of Exodus, a "breastplate" or "breastpiece" was among the clothes of the Jewish High Priest. It was a folded-over cloth garment embedded with 12 different gemstones, each inscribed with the name of a tribe of Israel.

In both the Hebrew Bible and the New Testament, the word 'breastplate' is used figuratively to describe protecting oneself from unrighteousness.

== North American ==
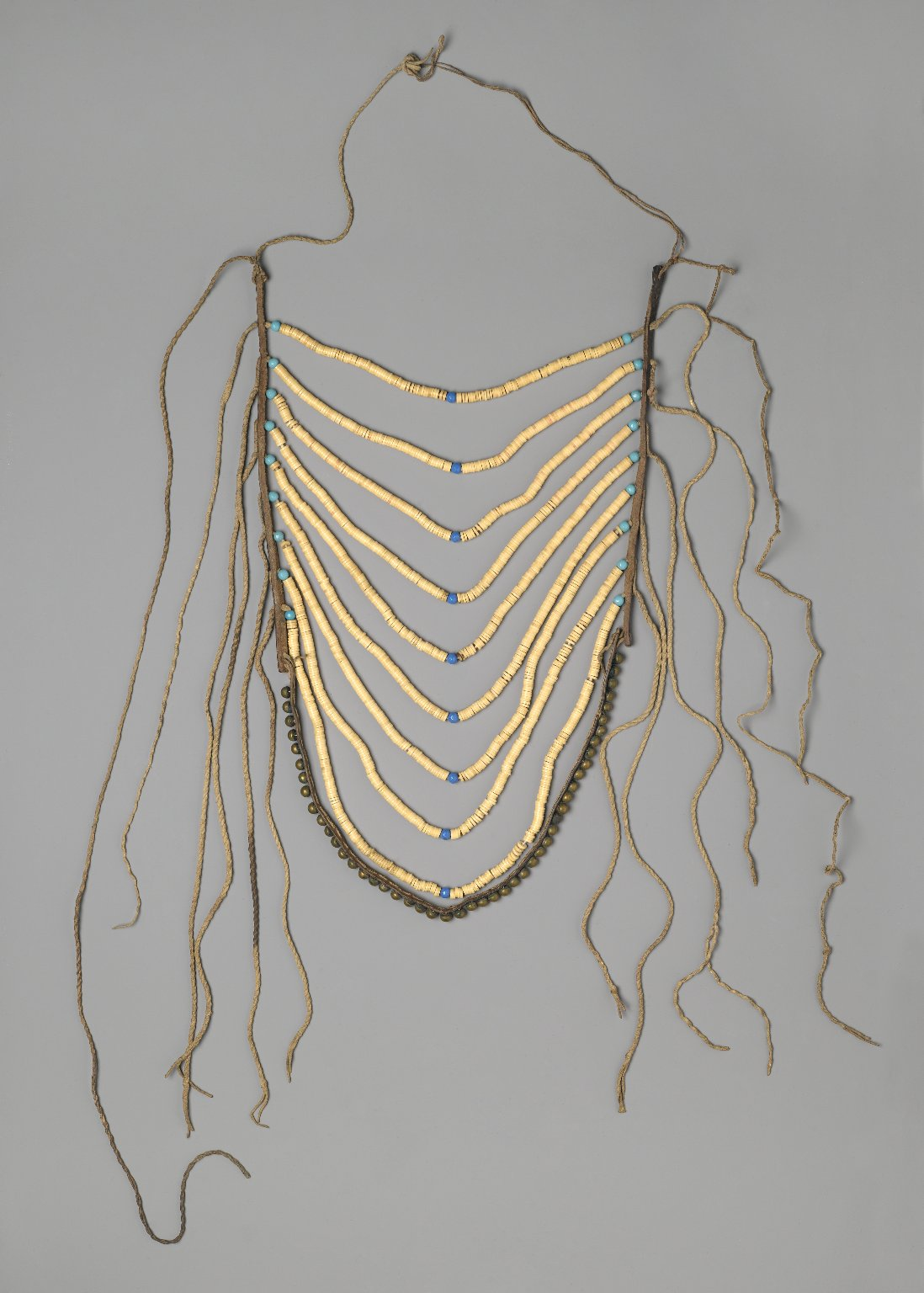
Man's Breastplate, Crow (Native American), 1880–1900, Brooklyn Museum

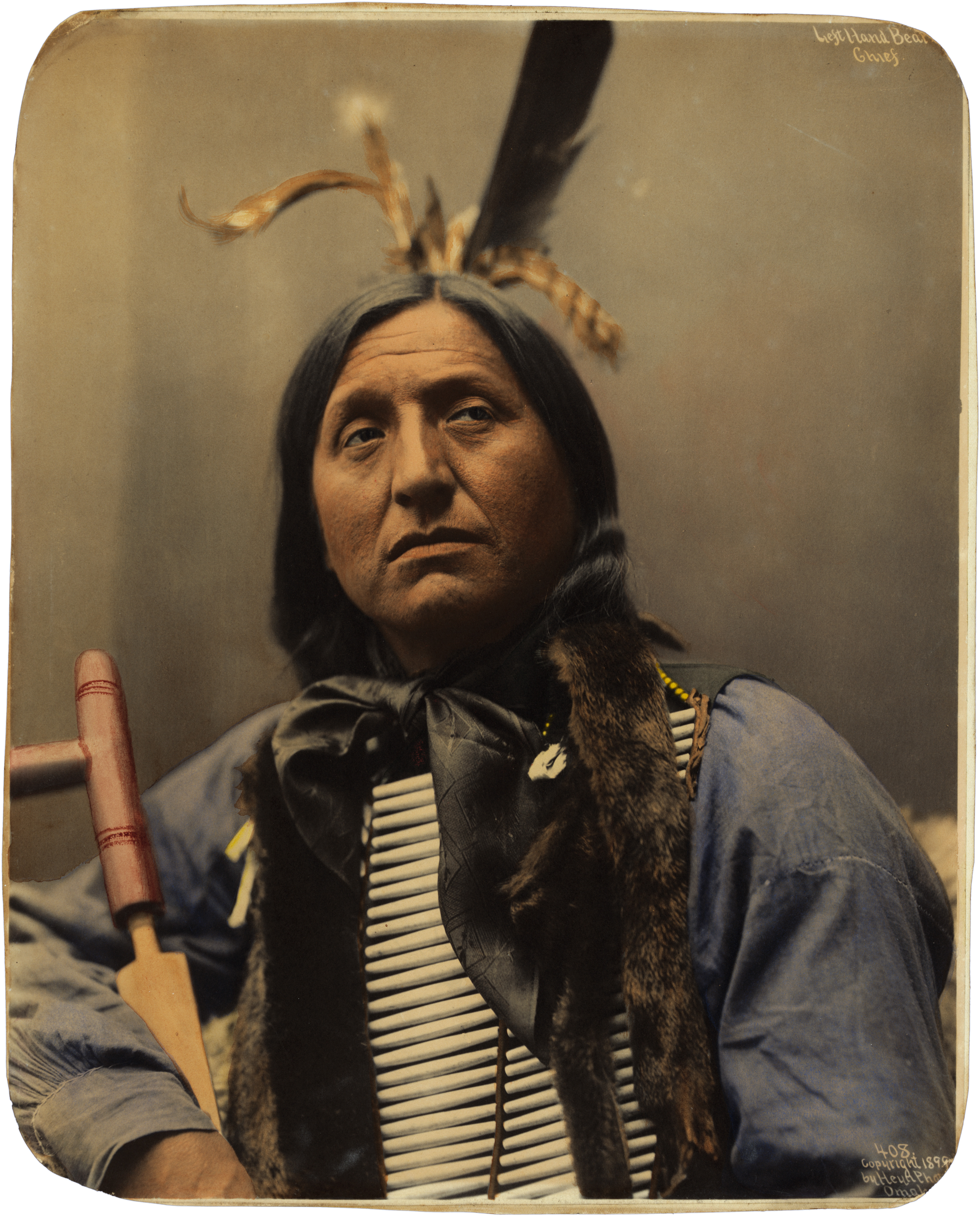
Left Hand Bear, an Oglala Lakota chief, wearing a hair-pipe breastplate, Omaha, 1898.

The hair-pipe breastplates of 19th-century Interior Plains people were made from the West Indian conch, brought to New York docks as ballast and then traded to Native Americans of the upper Missouri River. The materials used to create the indigenous breastplates included animal bones, beads, leather, and hide thong. Due to the materials used in making a breastplate, they were not very durable, therefore the breastplate was often connected to ceremonies and social dances. Their popularity spread rapidly after their invention by the Comanche in 1854. Indigenous breastplates made appearances in Wild West Shows throughout the 1880's when indigenous peoples would appear in them, including Buffalo Bills in 1883. After the Indian Removal Act was passed by the United States Congress in 1830, and many peoples were removed from their land and placed on indian reservations, Plains Indians exchanged breastplates (and other hair pipe native creations) as gifts to the relocated peoples due to increasing friendly relations during the reservation period. during an economic depression among Plains Indians after the buffalo were almost exterminated, the breastplate became a symbol of wealth. It was worn by prominent Indigenous figures such as Running Bird (an Kiowa leader) during an intertribal council on the Little Big Horn in 1909.

== See also ==
- Armour
- Cuirass
- Muscle cuirass
- Lance rest
- Linothorax
- Pteruges
- Gorget
