= Barbute =

Type of helmet

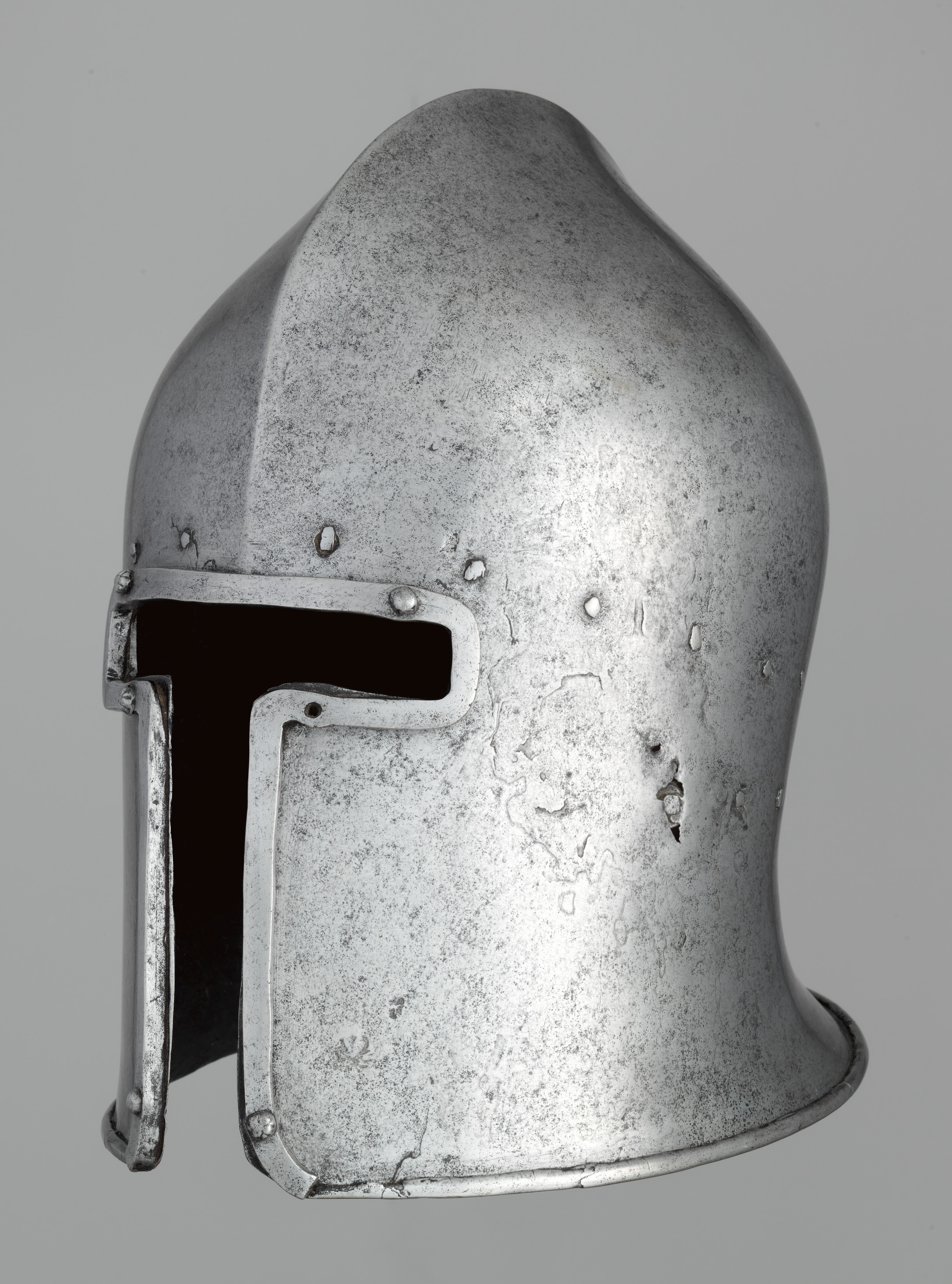
Italian barbuta, c. 1460, of the T-shaped form, the Metropolitan Museum of Art

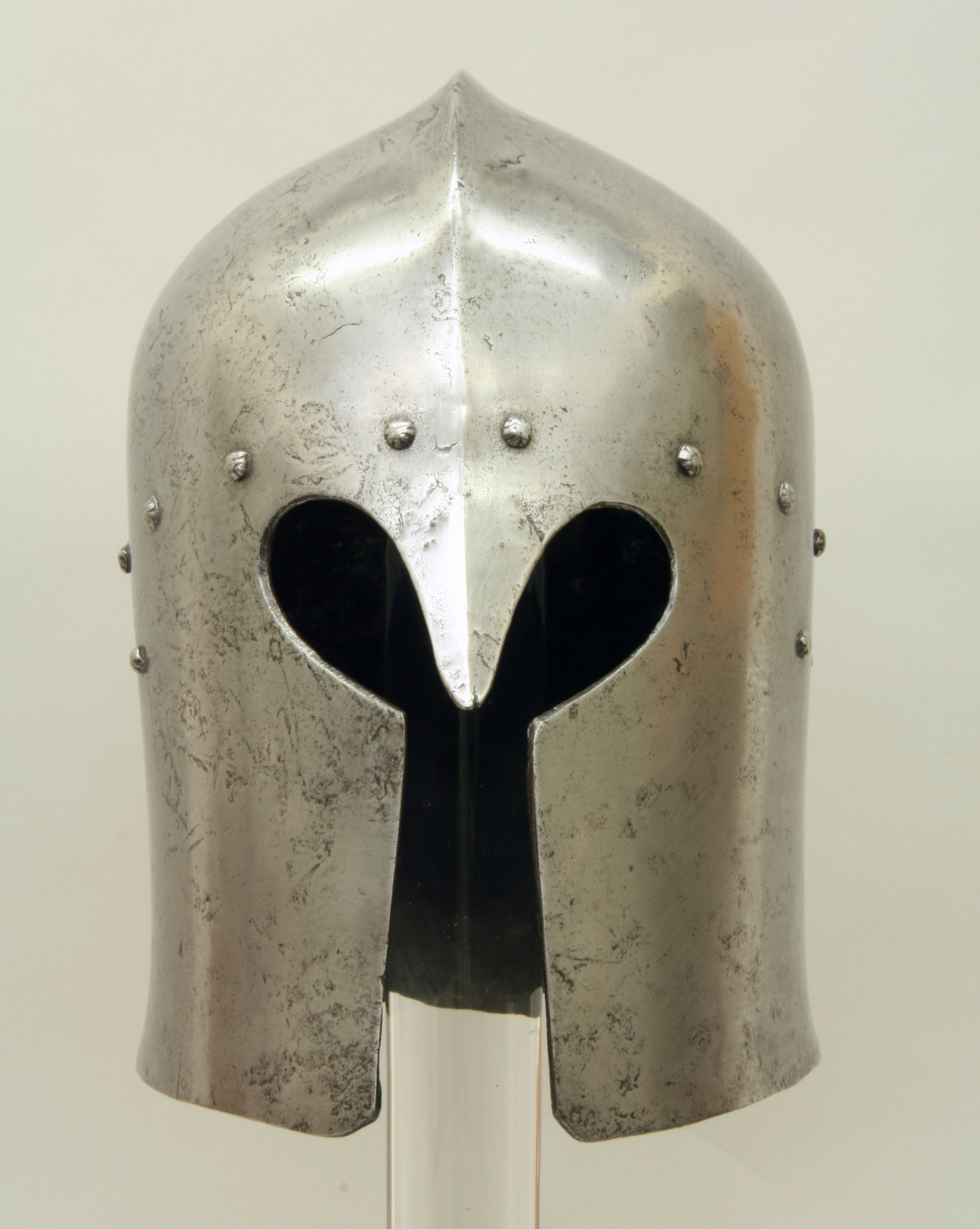
Italian barbuta, of the Y-shaped form with nasal - 1470–80, Metropolitan Museum of Art

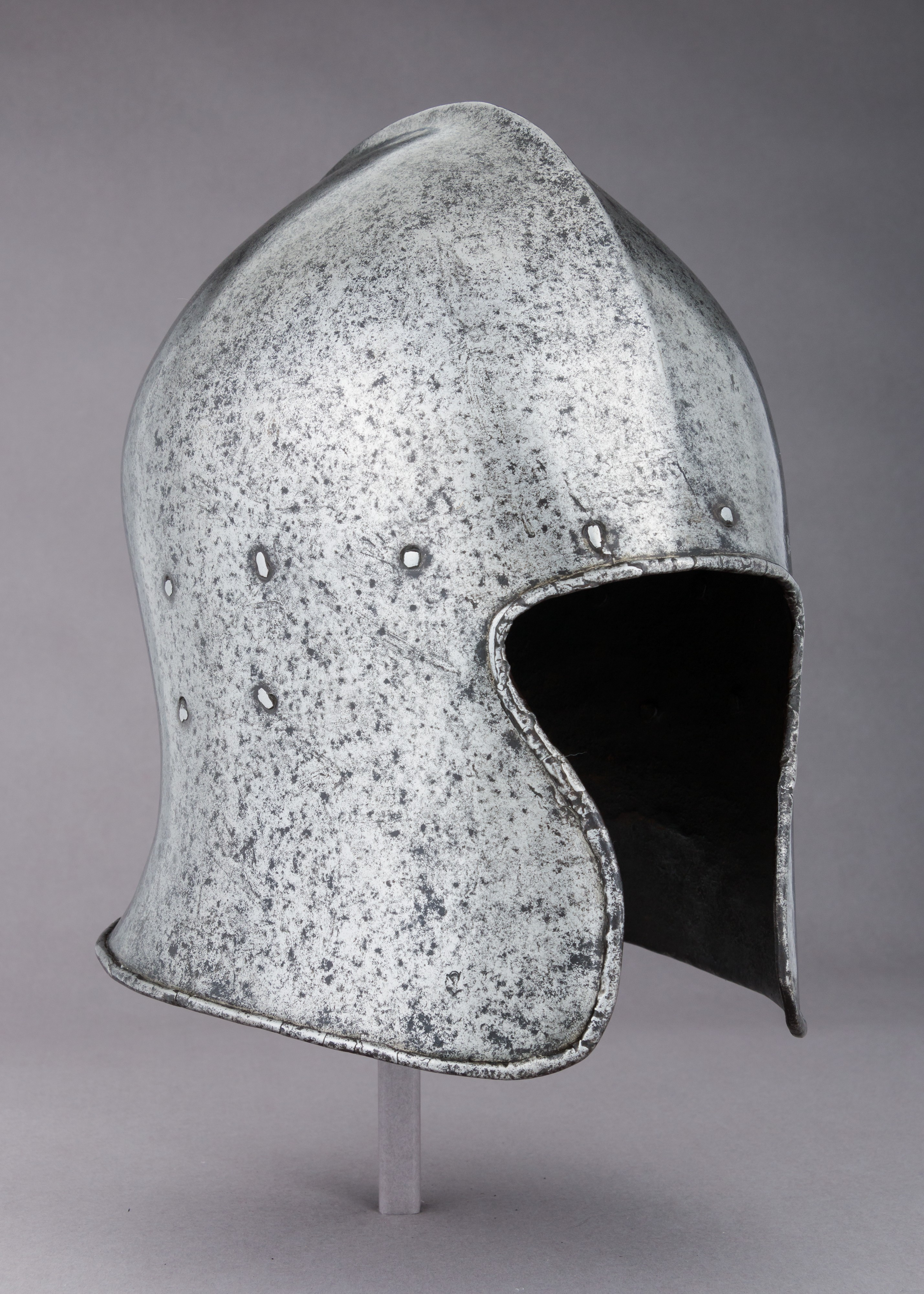
Italian barbuta, 1470–80, of the more open-faced form with an arched opening, the Metropolitan Museum of Art

A barbute (also termed a barbuta, which in Italian literally means "bearded", possibly because the beard of a wearer would be visible) is a visorless war helmet of 15th-century Italian design, often with a distinctive T-shaped or Y-shaped opening for the eyes and mouth.

== Origins ==
The name 'barbuta', when applied to a helmet, is first recorded in an inventory made for the Gonzaga family of Mantua in 1407. The helmet can be considered as a specialised form of the sallet, both types of helmet being ultimately derivations of the earlier bascinet. The barbute resembles classical Greek helmets (most strikingly the Corinthian) and may have been influenced by the renewed interest in ancient artefacts common during this period.

== Characteristics ==
This type of helmet has been described as an example of formal beauty being the result of functional efficiency. The defining characteristic of the barbute is the forward extension of the sides of the helmet towards the mid-line; this gives protection to the sides of the user's face below the eyes. Regardless of the form of the combined vision and breath opening, T-shaped, Y-shaped or arch-shaped, this characteristic is always present. The edge of the T-shaped opening is almost always reinforced by a riveted-on iron rim, usually extending to the lower edge of the helmet. The Y-shaped form often incorporates a distinct projection to guard the nose, which otherwise would protrude from the combined ventilation and vision opening. At least one example exists incorporating an extremely elongated nasal, which is hinged. The barbute could be worn with a plate gorget. However, the barbute was often worn with a stiffened mail collar, termed a "standard", which protected the throat and neck. Some examples of the barbute, as in a number of Italian sallets, were covered in a rich decorative fabric, typically heavy velvet. A number of surviving barbutes incorporate a keyhole-shaped hole at the apex of the skull for the attachment of a decorative crest. A contemporary painting commissioned by Federigo da Montefeltro, Duke of Urbino, shows a barbuta surmounted by a crest in the shape of a heraldic eagle.

Unlike the sallet, the barbute seems to have enjoyed little popularity outside Italy.

Barbutes were most commonly raised from a single sheet of metal; however, modern metallurgy has shown that many Italian Renaissance helmets were essentially of iron faced with steel, which was annealed and quenched to give it the desired characteristics of a hard outer surface, with a ductile inner layer which prevented shattering. Many barbutes feature a low front-to-back ridge, raised from the top of the helmet's skull, as can be seen on all the examples shown.

== Bibliography ==
- Boccia, Leonello (1966). Armi Italiane. Bologna: Zanichelli.
- Grancsay, Stephen V. (January 1963). "Sculpture in Steel: A Milanese Renaissance Barbute". The Metropolitan Museum of Art Bulletin. New Series. 21 (5): 182–191. doi:10.2307/3257953. JSTOR 3257953.
- Oakeshott, Ewart (1980). European Weapons and Armour: From the Renaissance to the Industrial Revolution. Lutterworth Press. ISBN 9780718821265. OCLC 7284129.
- Pyhrr, Stuart W. (1989). "European Armor from the Imperial Ottoman Arsenal". Metropolitan Museum Journal. 24. The University of Chicago Press on behalf of The Metropolitan Museum of Art: 85–116. doi:10.2307/1512872. JSTOR 1512872.
