= Tin hat =

Tin hat can refer to:

- Kettle hat, part of medieval armour
- Tin hat (military), the Brodie helmet of World Wars one and two (which is also the origin of the UK phrase "put the tin hat on [something]")

As a proper noun, Tin Hat can refer to:

- Tin Hat Linux, a Linux distribution
- Tin Hat, formerly known as the Tin Hat Trio, an acoustic chamber music group currently based in San Francisco, California

== See also ==
- Tin foil hat, a headpiece associated with paranoia
