= Standard (mail collar) =

Collar of mail often worn with plate armour

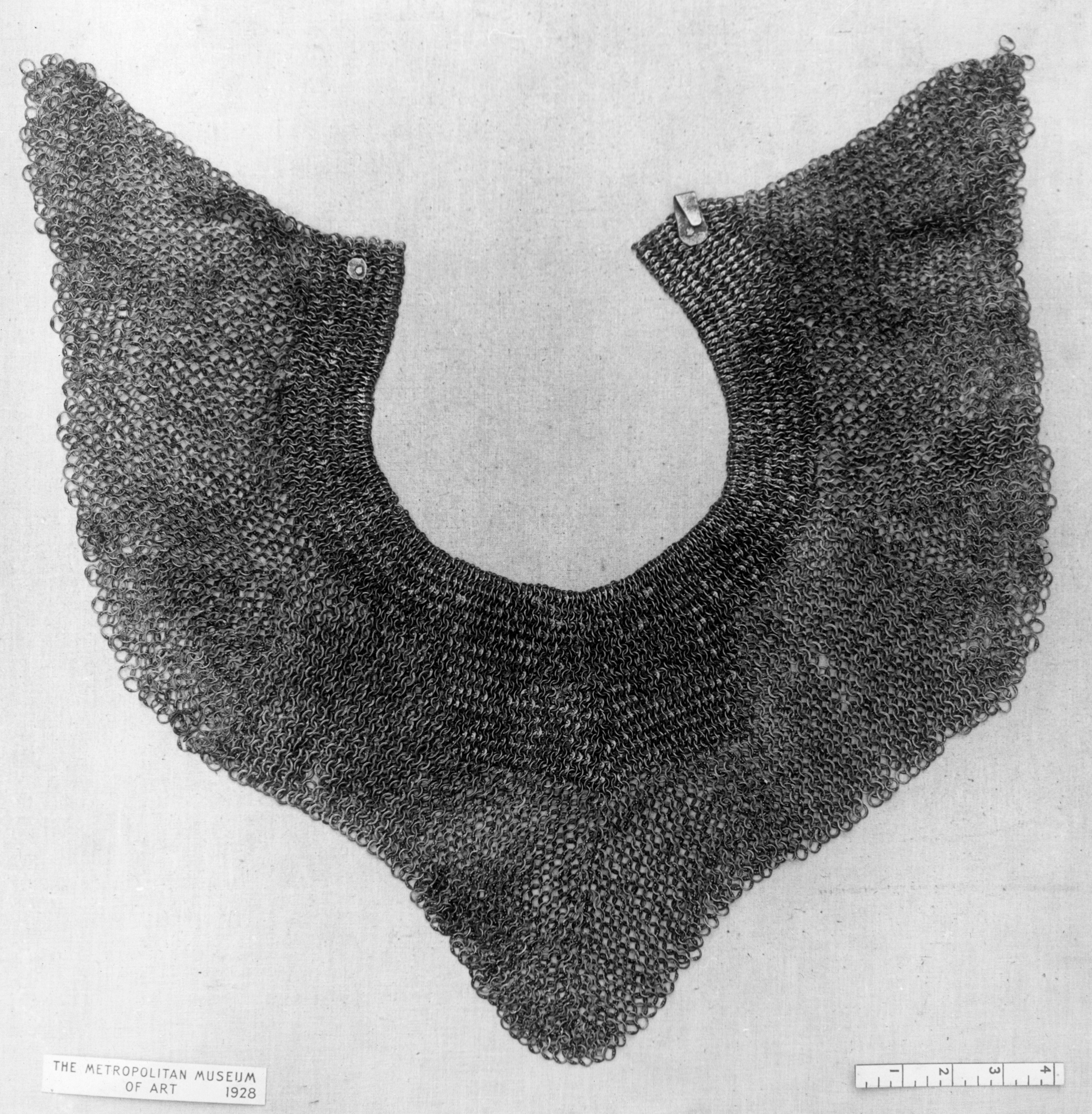
Mail standard 16th century, the transition between the more densely linked upstanding throat/neck part and the less densely linked shoulder section of the collar can be seen

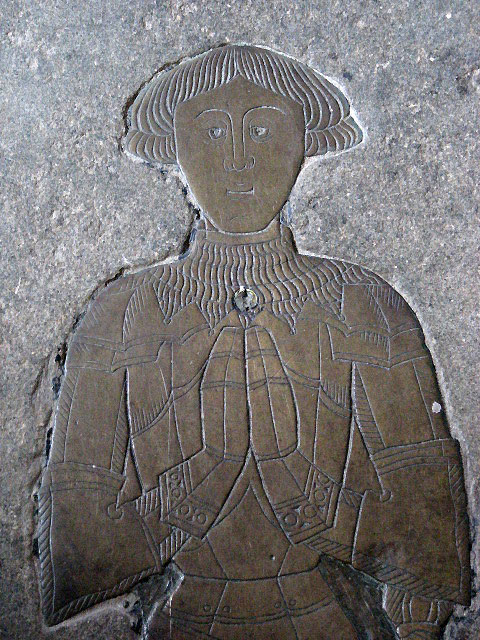
Fully armoured man wearing a vandyked standard, English funerary brass c. 1480

A standard, also called a pizaine, was a collar of mail often worn with plate armour.

== Construction ==
The standard protected the throat and neck and usually extended over the shoulders; it was in use from the 14th to the 16th century. Unlike the similar aventail, it was not attached to a helmet. It was called a standard because the part encircling the neck and throat was able to stand upright without any external stiffening. According to Blair, "this was effected by thickening the rings so that the mesh became semi-rigid." While there exists a surviving mail collar that is thickened at the neck with a 6-in-1 weave this form of construction is extremely rare. Some standards were decorated with edging in brass or bronze links (sometimes gilded), and/or were given a zig-zag lower edge (vandyked).

== Use ==
Standards were sometimes worn under an aventail, or even a gorget, for extra protection. However, standards were often worn without other neck protection by soldiers who valued an unencumbered facility to move the head over additional protection. Standards were popular with archers, whose mobility was at a premium. Standards were frequently worn with helmets that did not afford integral neck and throat protection, such as the sallet, barbute, and kettle hat.

== Bibliography ==
- Blair, C. (1959) European Armour: circa 1066 to circa 1700, The Macmillan Company, New York
- Loades, M. (2013) The Longbow, Bloomsbury Publishing ISBN 9781782000860
- Way, A. (1862) Original Documents The Armour and Arms Belonging to Henry Bowet, Archbishop of York, Deceased in 1423, from the Roll of his Executors’ Accounts, Archaeological Journal, 19:1, 159-165, DOI:10.1080/00665983.1862.10851226
