= Lance rest =

Piece in medieval plate armour

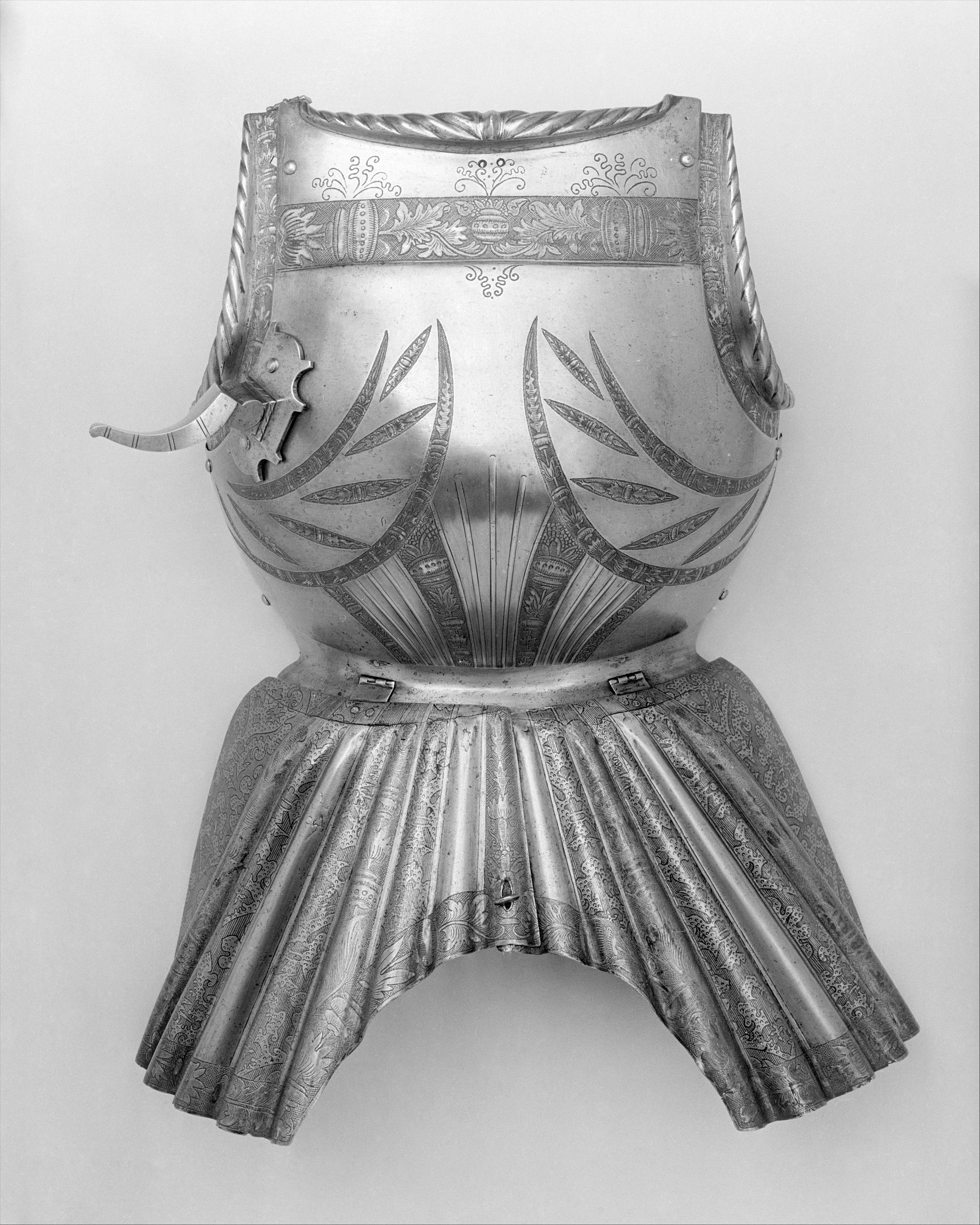
Breastplate with a lance rest on the right side

A lance rest (French: arrêt de cuirasse or arrêt) is a metal flange or hook that is typically attached to the right side of a breastplate, just under the armpit. The lance rest appeared in the late 14th century, remaining in use until the use of full plate armour and heavy lances became obsolete for general use in the late 16th and early 17th centuries.

The lance rest was used to stop the rearward movement of the weapon upon impact. This allowed the wielder of the lance to create an unyielding platform from which to couch the weapon so that the rider's strong armour absorbed the shock of the impact, thus delivering a more solid blow to his target while lessening the chance of injury to himself. The lance rest achieves this by spreading the impact of a blow through the breastplate to the torso of the wearer, thus redirecting the need for the hand, wrist, elbow, and shoulder of the rider to carry the force of blow through onto the target.

A grapper (arrêt de lance) was a ring of wood, leather or metal affixed to the lance behind the hand grip such that it would sit just in front of the lance rest when couched. The grapper would then engage the lance rest upon impact, "arresting" the backward movement of the lance, while also being able to quickly disengage when the lance needed to separate from its wielder or be moved. Together they would form a solid point of resistance to help minimise the dissipation of the force of the lance upon impact and thus help maximise the force of the blow delivered on the target. Similarly, a vamplate in front of the gripping point on the lance would help stop it being forced back through the hand on impact.

The lance rest is typically bolted to the side of the breastplate or secured through the use of metal tabs known as staples. Most lance rests were hinged so that they could be folded upwards to prevent interference with the wearer's sword arm once the lance had been discarded after the initial impact in favor of a sword.
