= Gorget =

Type of body armor worn around the neck

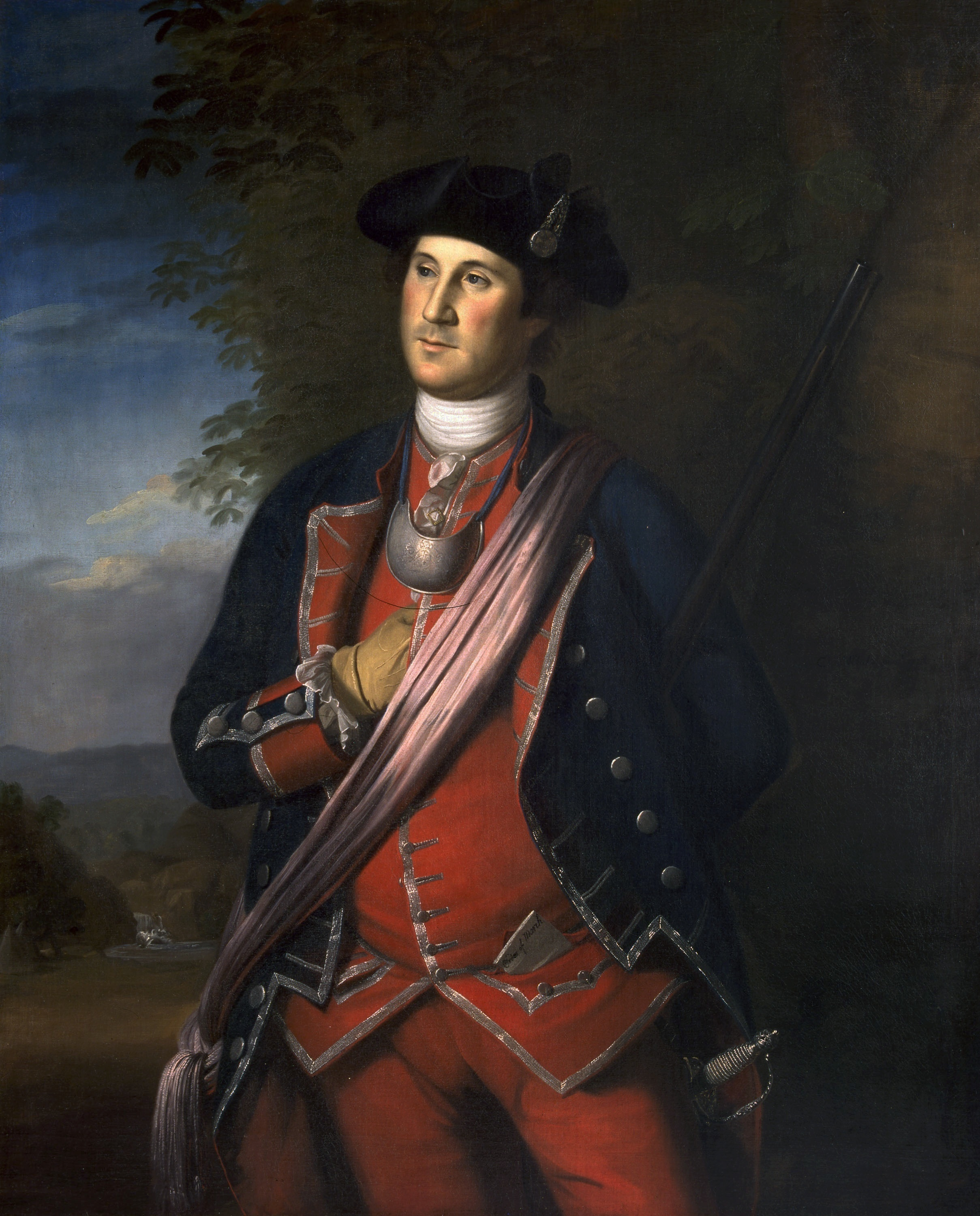
The gorget in this 1772 portrait of Colonel George Washington by Charles Willson Peale, was worn in the French and Indian War to show his rank as an officer in the Virginia Regiment.

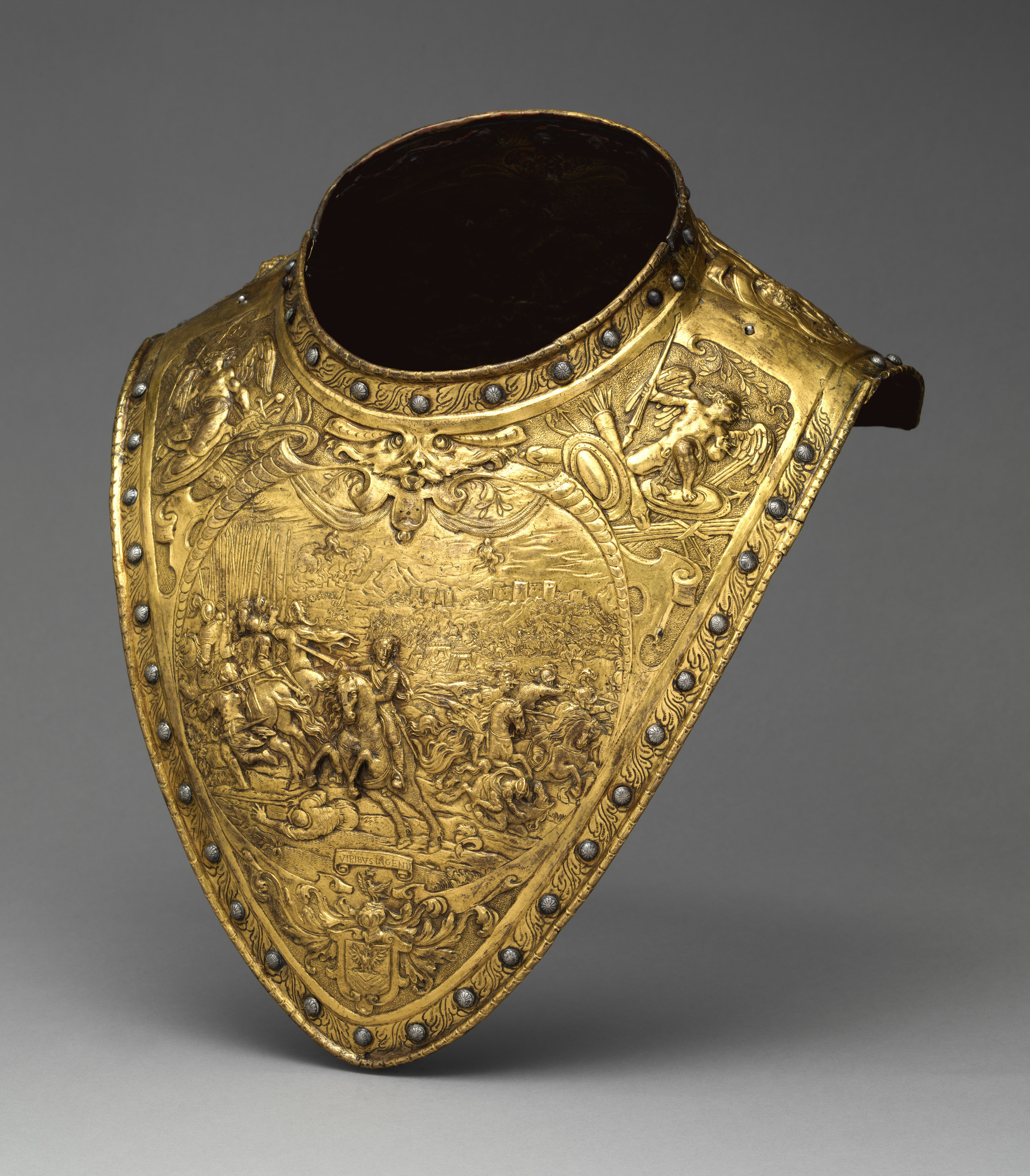
Elaborately decorated gilt-brass gorget of c. 1630, probably Dutch

A gorget (/ˈɡɔːrdʒɪt/ GOR-jit; from Old French gorge 'throat') is a band of linen that was wrapped around a woman's neck and head in the medieval period or the lower part of a simple chaperon hood. The term later described a steel or leather collar to protect the throat, a set of pieces of plate armour, or a single piece of plate armour hanging from the neck and covering the throat and chest. Later, particularly from the 18th century, the gorget became primarily ornamental, serving as a symbolic accessory on military uniforms (mainly on officers' uniforms), a use which has survived in some armies.

The term may also be used for other things such as items of jewellery worn around the throat region in several societies, for example wide thin gold collars found in prehistoric Ireland dating to the Bronze Age.

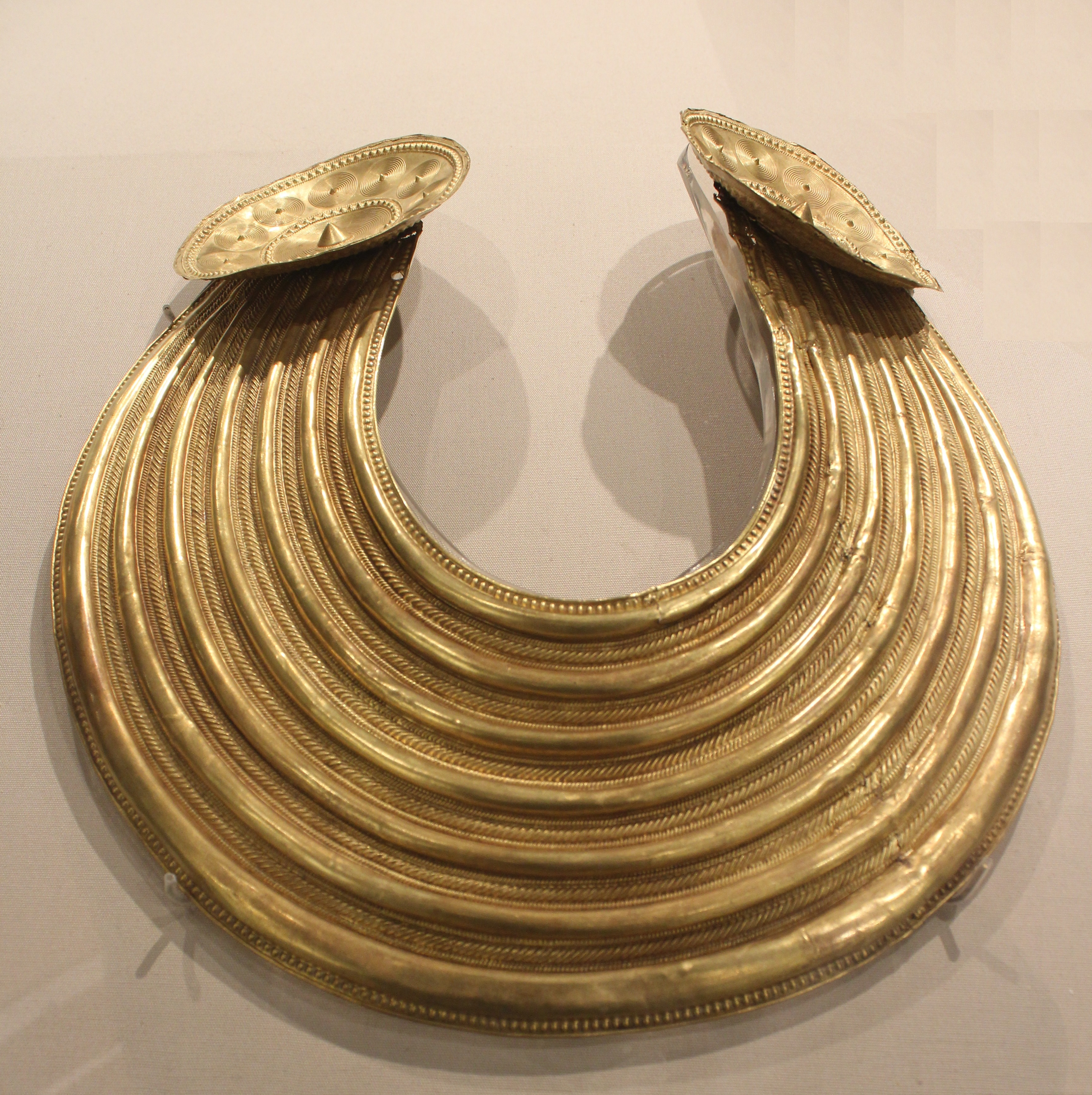
The Gleninsheen gold gorget, Irish Bronze Age, National Museum of Ireland

== As part of armour ==
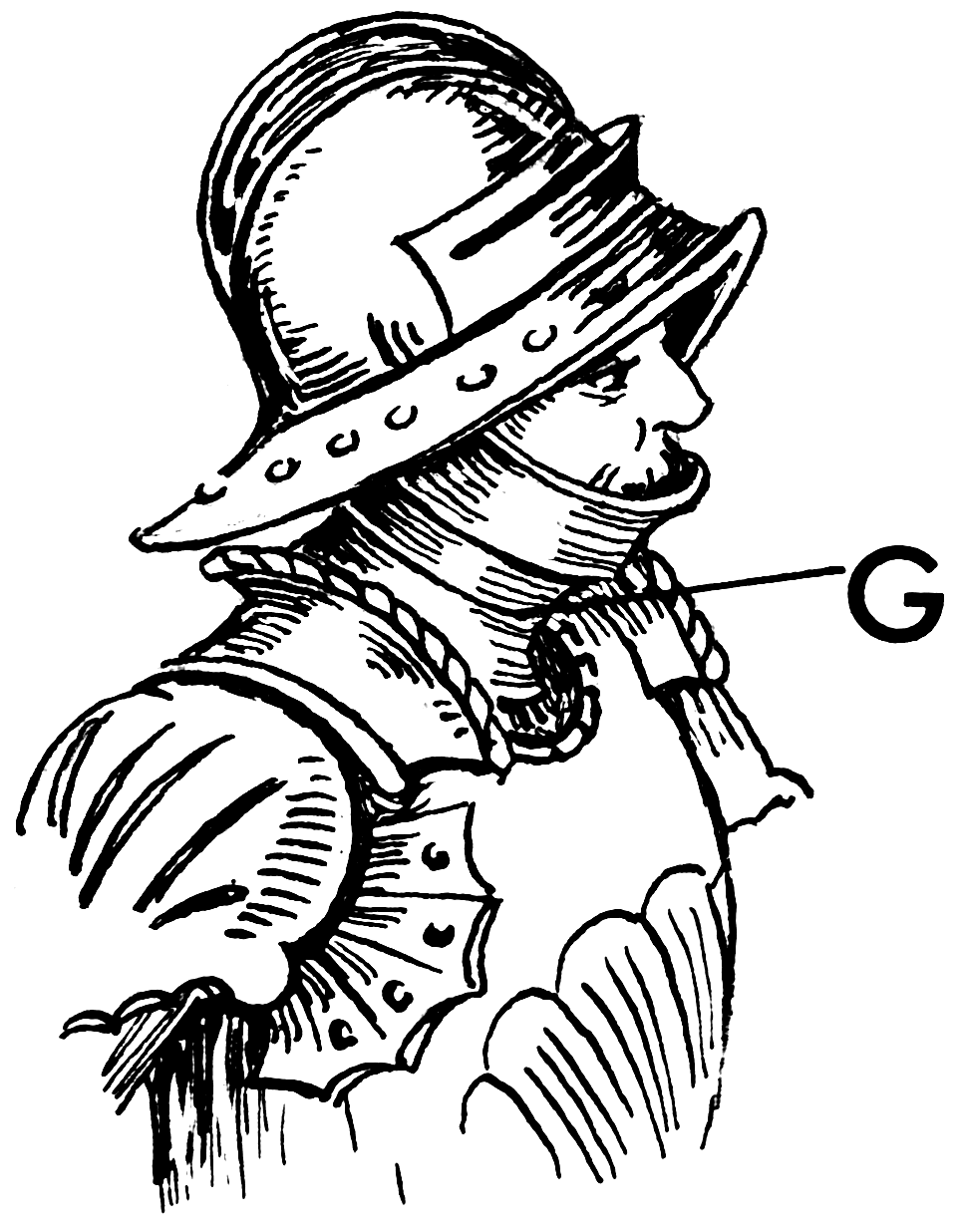
Gorget in a full suit of armour

In the High Middle Ages, when mail was the primary form of metal body armour used in Western Europe, the mail coif protected the neck and lower face. In this period, the term gorget seemingly referred to textile (padded) protection for the neck, often worn over mail. As more plate armour appeared to supplement mail during the 14th century, the bascinet helmet incorporated a mail curtain called the aventail which protected the lower face, neck and shoulders. A separate mail collar called a "pisan" or "standard" was sometimes worn under the aventail as additional protection. Towards the end of the 14th century, threats including the increased penetrating power of the lance when paired with a lance rest on the breastplate made more rigid forms of neck protection desirable. One solution was a standing collar plate separate from the helmet that could be worn over the aventail, with enough space between the collar and helmet that a man-at-arms could turn his head inside it. In the early 15th century, such collar plates were integrated into the helmet itself to form the great bascinet. Other forms of helmet such as the sallet which did not protect the lower face and throat with plate were paired with a separate bevor, and the armet was often fitted with a wrapper that included gorget lames protecting the throat. The mail standard was still worn under such bevors and wrappers, since the plates did not cover the back or sides of the neck.

At the beginning of the 16th century, the gorget reached its full development as a component of plate armour. Unlike previous gorget plates and bevors which sat over the cuirass and also required a separate mail collar to fully protect the neck, the developed gorget was worn under the cuirass and was intended to cover a larger area of the neck, nape, shoulders and upper chest, from which the edges of the backplate and breastplate had receded. The gorget served as an anchor point for the pauldrons, which either had holes in them to engage pins projecting from the gorget, or straps which could be buckled to the gorget. The neck was protected by a high collar of articulated lames, and the entire gorget assembly was divided into a front and a rear half which were hinged at the side so that the gorget could be put on and taken off. Some helmets had additional neck lames which overlapped the gorget, while others formed a tight seal with the rim of the gorget to eliminate any gaps.

By the 17th century there appeared a form of gorget with a low, unarticulated collar and larger front and back plates which covered more of the upper chest and back. In addition to being worn under the breast & backplates, as evidenced by at least two contemporary engravings, they were also commonly worn over civilian clothing or a buff coat. Some gorgets of this period were "parade" pieces that were beautifully etched, gilded, engraved, chased, embossed or enameled at great expense. Gradually the gorget grew smaller and more symbolic, becoming a single crescent shape worn on a chain which suspended the gorget ever lower on the chest, so that the gorget no longer protected the throat in normal wear.

The Japanese (samurai) form of the gorget, called a nodowa, was either fastened by itself around the neck or came as an integral part of the face defence or men yoroi. It consisted of several lames made of lacquered leather or iron, each of which either consisted of one piece or of scales laced together in horizontal rows. The lames were articulated vertically, overlapping bottom to top, by another set of silk laces.

== As part of military uniforms ==
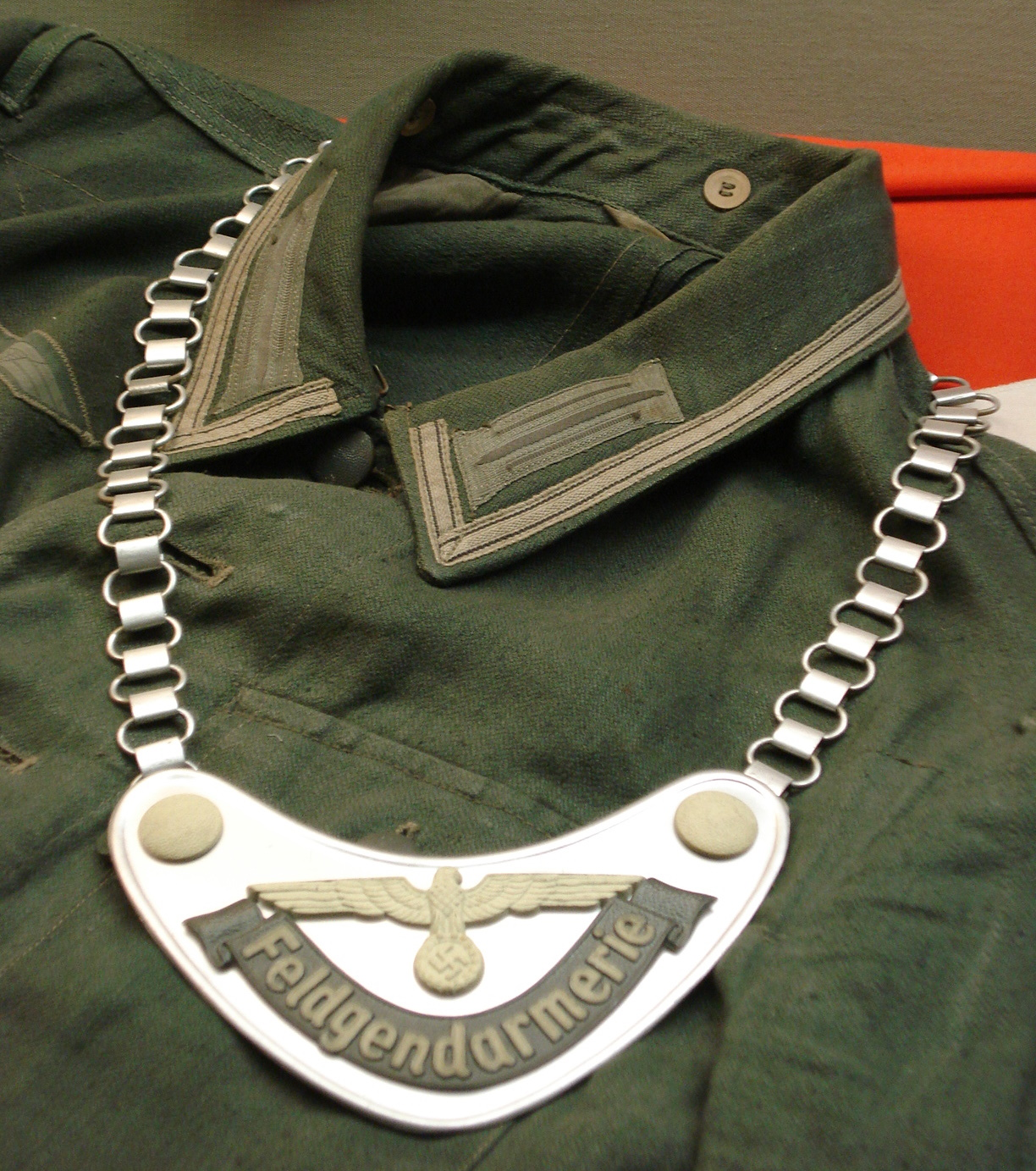
German military police gorget from World War II

During the 18th and early 19th centuries, crescent-shaped gorgets of silver or silver gilt were worn by officers, mainly infantry, in most European armies, as a badge of rank and an indication that they were on duty. These last vestiges of armour were much smaller (usually about 7 to 10 cm (2.8 to 3.9 in) in width) than their Medieval predecessors and were suspended by cords, chains or ribbons. In the British service they carried the Royal coat of arms until 1796 and thereafter the Royal Cypher. During the reign of Napoleon I, the French ones carried often a design with the imperial eagle, the regimental number, a hunting horn or a flaming grenade, but non-regulation designs were not uncommon. Gorgets ceased to be worn by British army officers in 1830 and by their French counterparts 20 years later. They were still worn to a limited extent in the Imperial German Army until 1914, as a special distinction by officers of the Prussian Gardes du Corps and the 2nd Cuirassiers "Queen". Officers of the Spanish infantry continued to wear gorgets with the cypher of King Alfonso XIII in full dress, until the overthrow of the Monarchy in 1931. Mexican Federal army officers also wore the gorget with the badge of their branch as part of their parade uniform until 1947.

The gorget was revived as a uniform accessory in Nazi Germany, seeing widespread use within the German military and Nazi Party organisations, mainly units with a police function and their flag bearers. During World War II, it continued to be used by Feldgendarmerie (military field police), who wore metal gorgets as emblems of authority. German police gorgets of this period typically took the form of flat metal crescents with ornamental designs that were suspended by a chain worn around the neck. These designs and lettering were painted with illuminating paint.

The Prussian-influenced Chilean army uses the German style metal gorget in parades and in the uniform of their Military Police.

=== In Sweden ===
As early as 1688, regulations were provided for the wearing of gorgets by Swedish army officers. For those of captain's rank the gorget was gilt with the king's monogram under a crown in blue enamel, while more junior officers wore silver-plated gorgets with the initials in gold.

The gorget was discontinued as a rank insignia for Swedish officers in the Swedish Armed Forces in 1792, when epaulettes were introduced. The gorget was revived in 1799, when the Officer of the day was given the privilege of wearing a gorget which featured the Swedish lesser coat of arms. It has since been a part of the officer's uniform (when he or she functions as "Officer of the day") a custom which continues.

Early Swedish gorget from the time of king Charles XI of Sweden for a colonel.

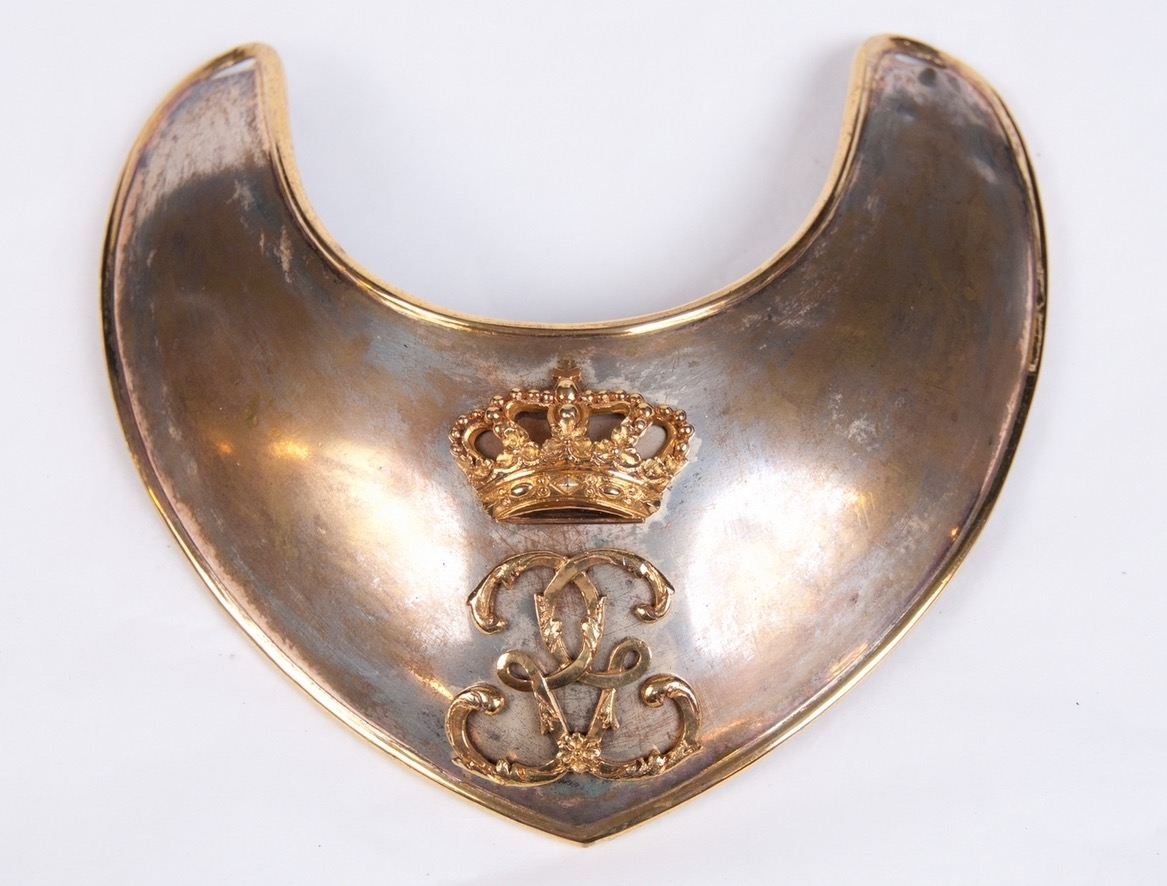
Gorget in silver for ensigns and lieutenants of the Swedish Army, with the royal cypher of Gustav III Swedish Army Museum.

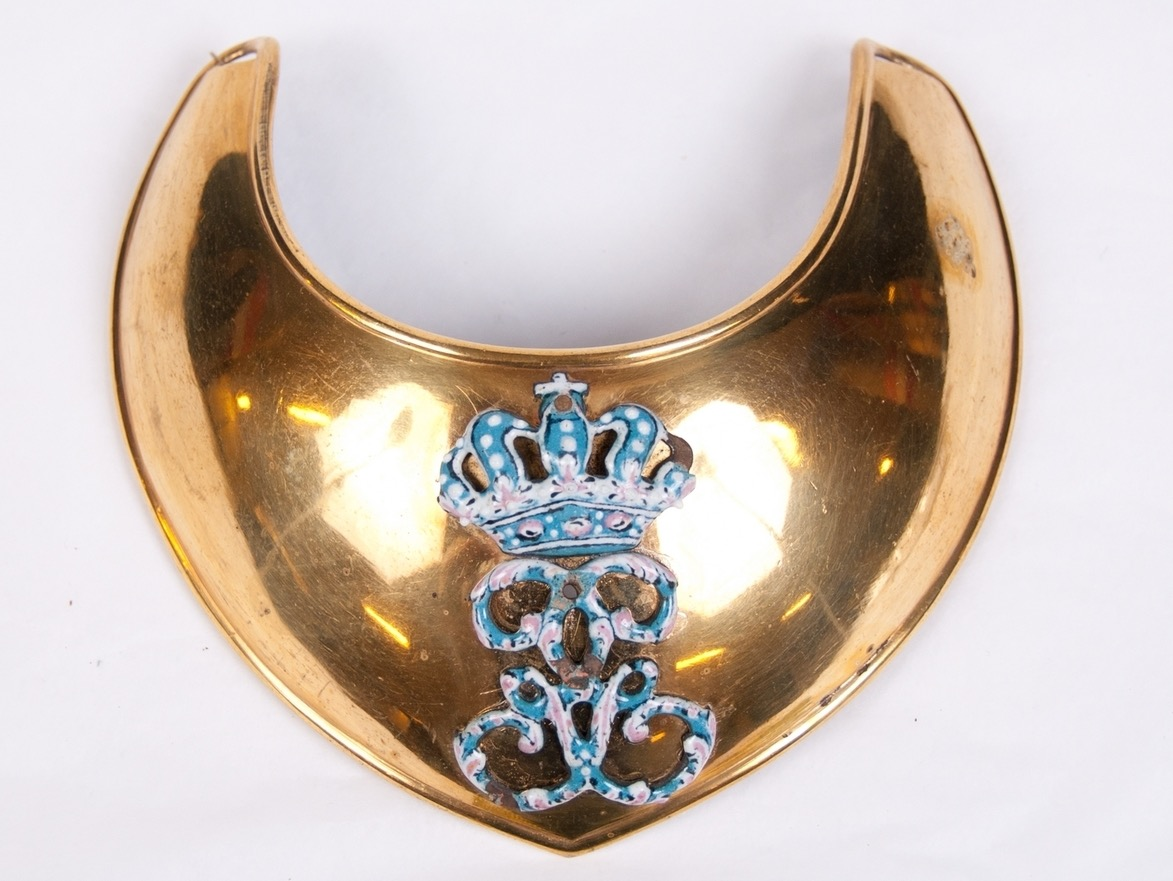
Gorget, silver gilt, for a captain with the royal cypher of Gustav III in enamel. Swedish Army Museum.

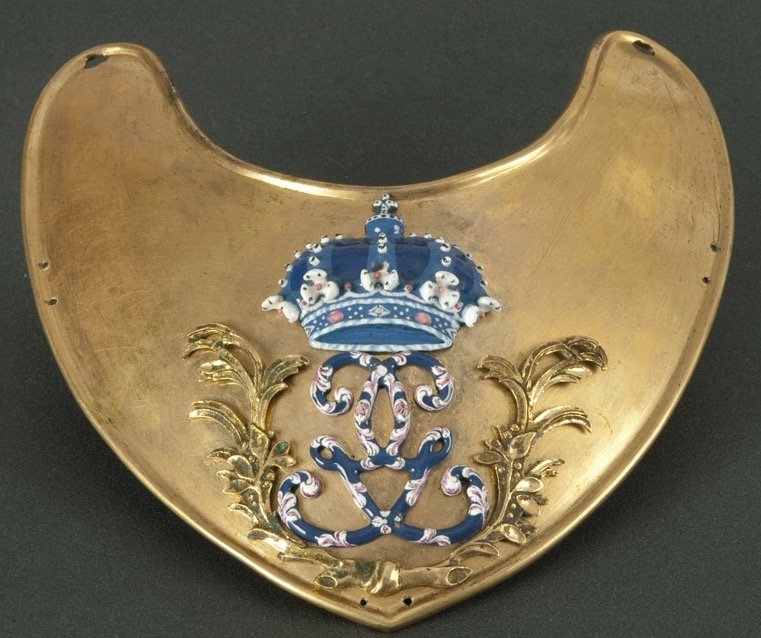
Gorget, silver gilt, for majors, lieutenant-colonels and colonels of the Swedish Army, with the royal cypher of Gustav III and two palm branches, all enameled. Swedish Army Museum.

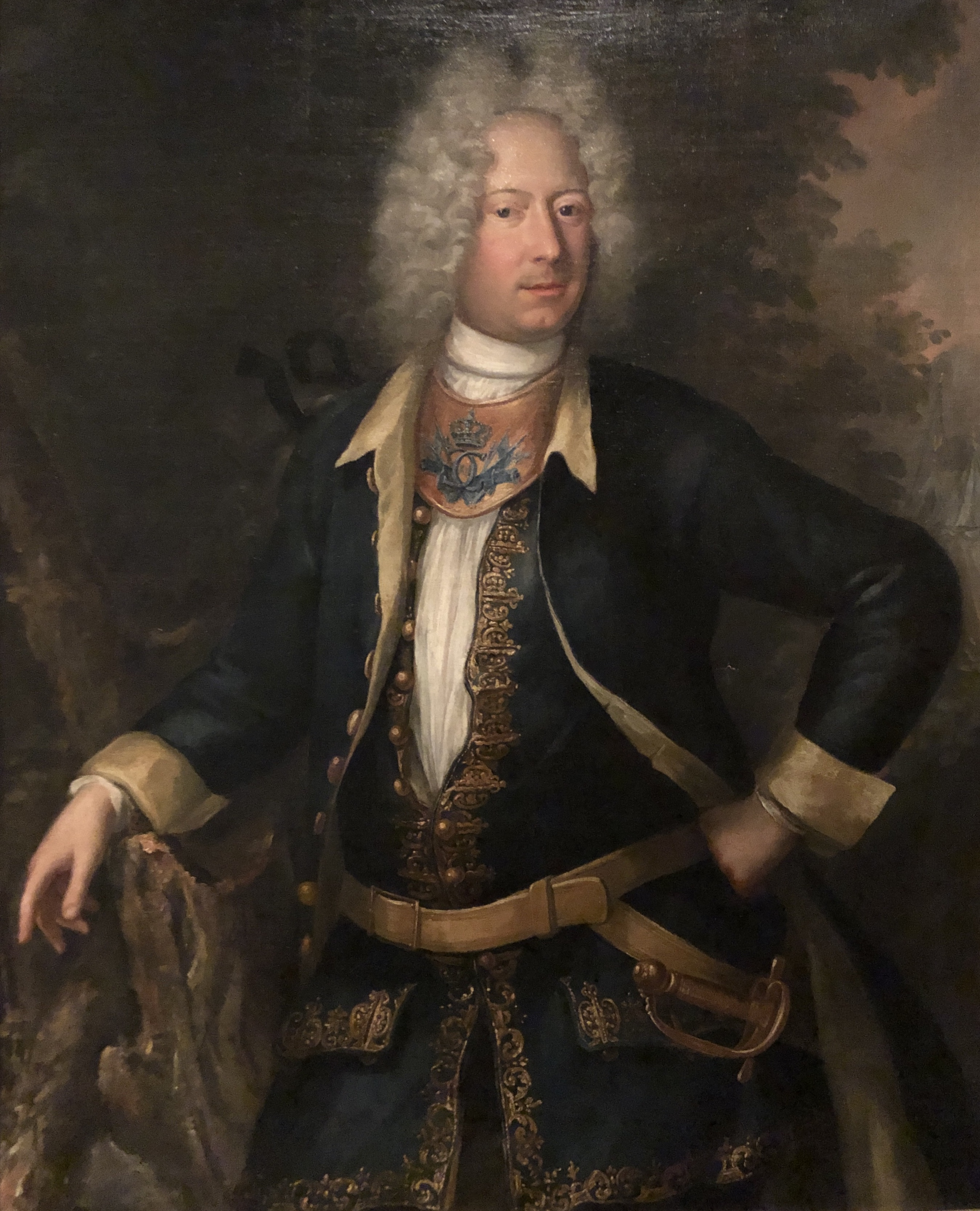
Arvid Horn in a uniform with a gorget for the captain lieutenant of the Kunglig Majestäts drabanter, the gorget with the royal cypher of Charles XII of Sweden, ca 1706.

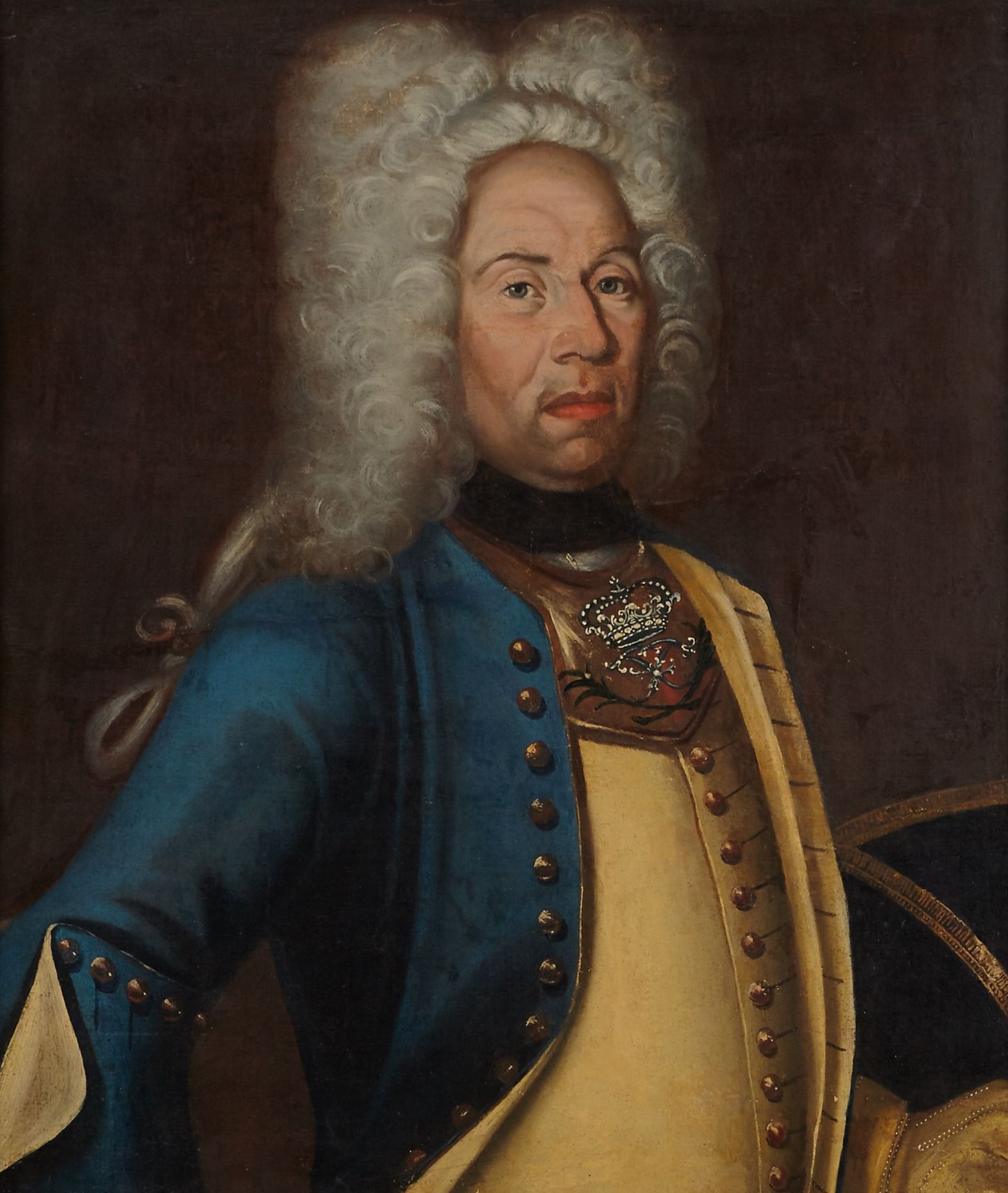
Peter Lilliehorn in the uniform and gorget of a major at the Kalmar Regiment, the gorget with the royal cypher of Frederick I of Sweden, 1727.

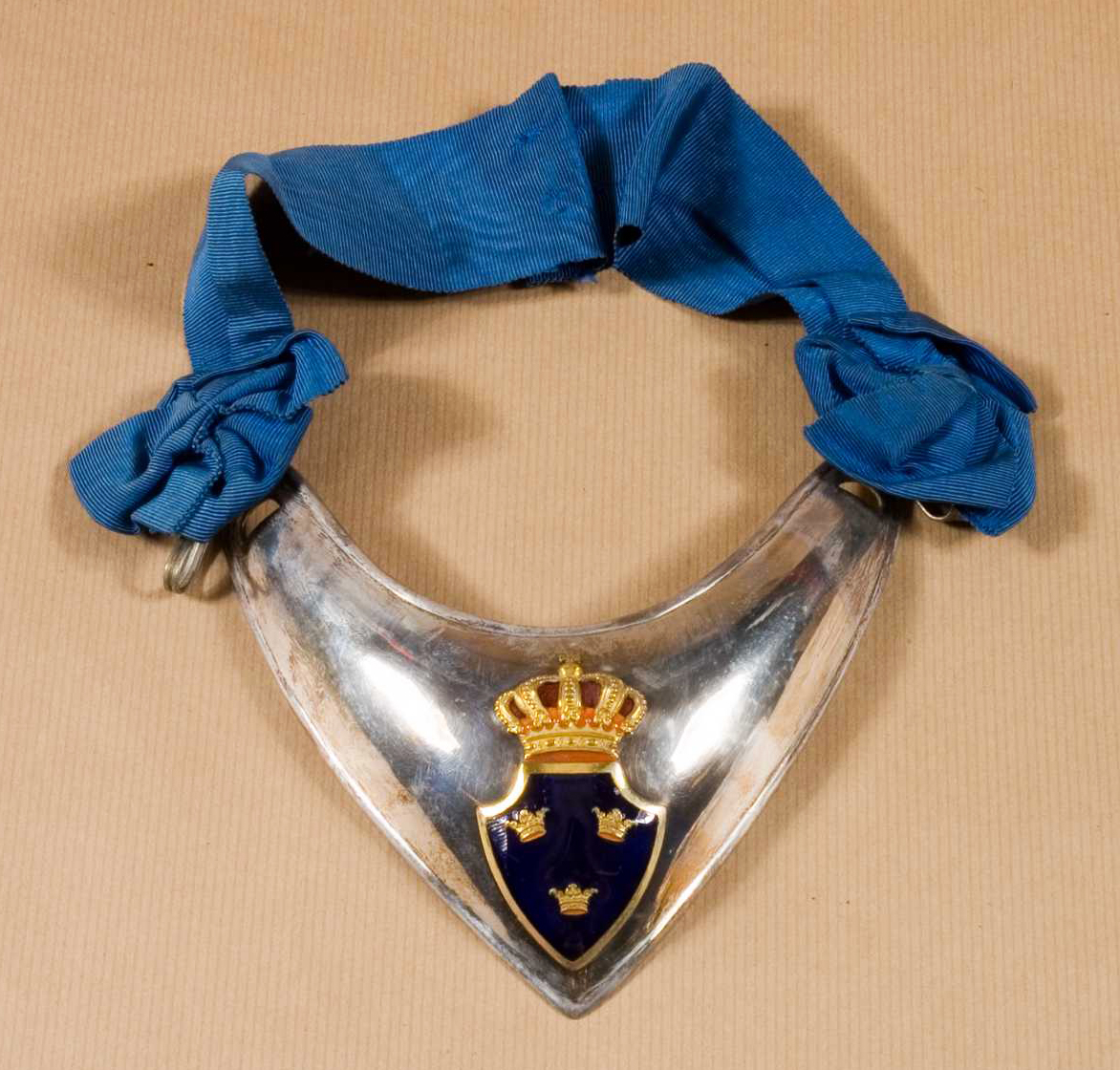
Swedish gorget model 1799 for the officer of the day. Swedish Army Museum.

=== In Norway and Finland ===
The same use of the gorget also continues in Norway and Finland, worn by officers or corporals responsible for guard changes and "Inspecting Officers" (officer of the day). The officer of the day of a company (Finnish: päivystäjä) is usually a non-commissioned officer (or even a private), who guards the entrance and is responsible for security within company quarters.

=== Gorget patches ===
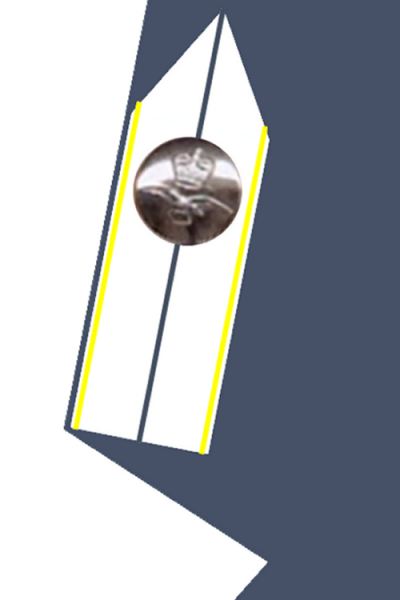
A gorget patch as worn by an RAF Officer Cadet

The scarlet patches still worn on each side of the collar of the tunics of British Army general officers and senior officers are called "gorget patches" in reference to this article of armour. There were two types - the first, red with a crimson centre stripe, were for Colonels and Brigadiers, and red with a gold centre stripe for General Officers. Today, they signify an officer of the General Staff, to which all British officers are appointed on reaching the rank of Colonel. With limited exceptions such as senior officers of the Army Medical and Dental Corps, the historic colour differentials are no longer worn in the British service.

However, the historic colours are still used in the gorget patches of the Canadian Army. Air officers in the Indian and Sri Lankan air forces also wear gorget patches with one to five stars depending on their seniority.

RAF officer cadets wear white gorget patches on their service dress and mess dress uniforms. Very similar collar patches are worn by British army officer cadets at Sandhurst on the standup collars of their dark-blue "Number One" dress uniforms. These features of modern uniforms are a residual survival from the earlier practice of suspending the actual gorgets from ribbons attached to buttons on both collars of the uniform. Such buttons were often mounted on a patch of coloured cloth or gold embroidery.

== Cultural and decorative uses ==
Gorgets made of shell, as well as stone and copper, have been found at archaeological sites of various ages associated with mound building cultures of Eastern North America, going back thousands of years.

Gorget stones are polished pieces of stones that were worn by Native Americans on the neck or chest as a decoration, ornament, or talisman.

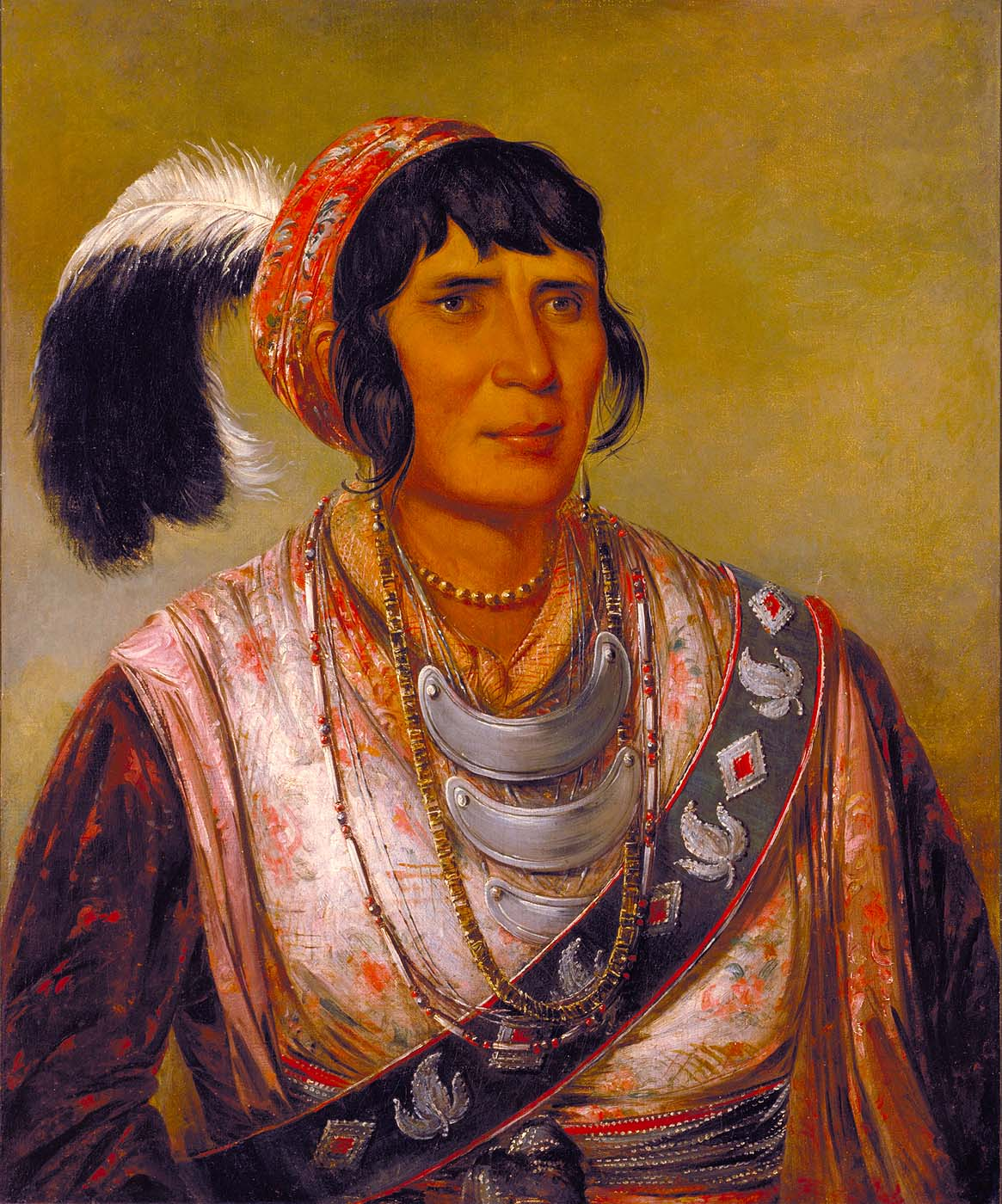
Influential Seminole leader Osceola wearing three metal gorgets in a portrait by George Catlin.

The British Empire awarded gorgets to chiefs of American Indian tribes, both as tokens of goodwill, and as a badge of their high status. Those being awarded a gorget were known as gorget captains Gorgets were also awarded to African chiefs.

In colonial Australia, gorgets were given to Aboriginal people by government officials and pastoralists as insignia of high rank or reward for services to the settler community. Frequently inscribed with the word "King" along with the name of the tribal group to which the recipient belonged (despite the absence of this kind of rank among indigenous Australians), the "breastplates", as they came to be known.

== Modern versions ==
Recent advances in protective armour have led to the functional gorget being reintroduced into the US Army and Marine Improved Outer Tactical Vest and Modular Tactical Vest systems respectively.

Modern bullet proof vest for police use, featuring a gorget (kroppsskydd m/69).

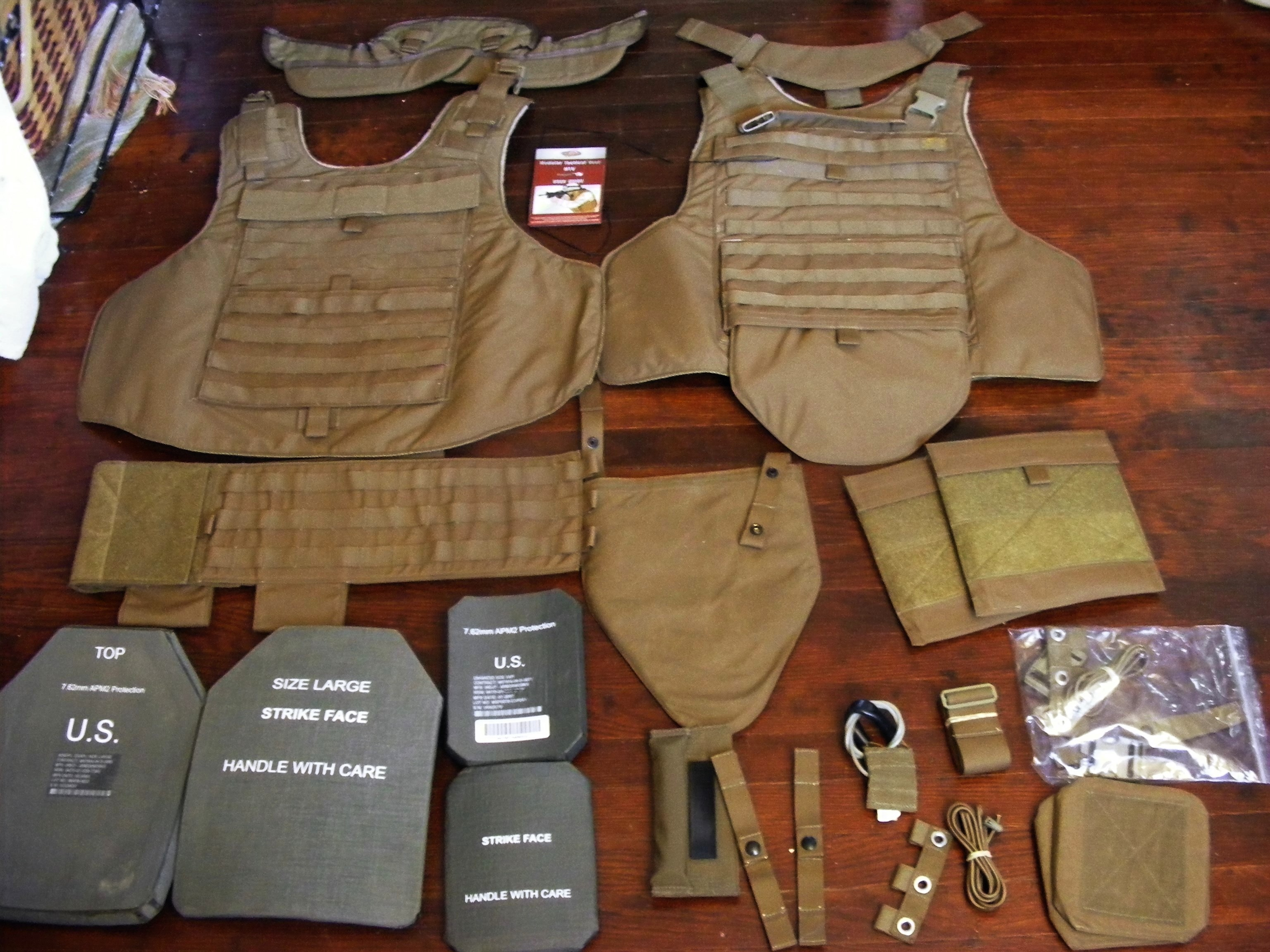
Modern tactical vest components. The gorget is in the upper right corner.

== Other uses ==
The state flag of South Carolina features a crescent in the upper left quadrant which now resembles a crescent moon, but which some oral traditions have suggested may have once represented a gorget. The state flag derives from a flag designed by Colonel William Moultrie in 1775 with a blue ground and crescent based on the uniforms of the Second South Carolina Regiment, who wore a crescent with the tips pointing up on their hats. Through the 19th century, the crescent on the state flag also appeared with the tips pointing up, and it was not until the 20th century that it was turned on its side to resemble a crescent moon. The mystery of its original meaning is still unresolved, and the crescent as it appears on the modern state flag is normally interpreted as a moon.

The term also refers to a patch of coloured feathers found on the throat or upper breast of some species of birds.

== See also ==
- Shell gorget
