= Hair pipe =

Elongated bead popular with American Indians

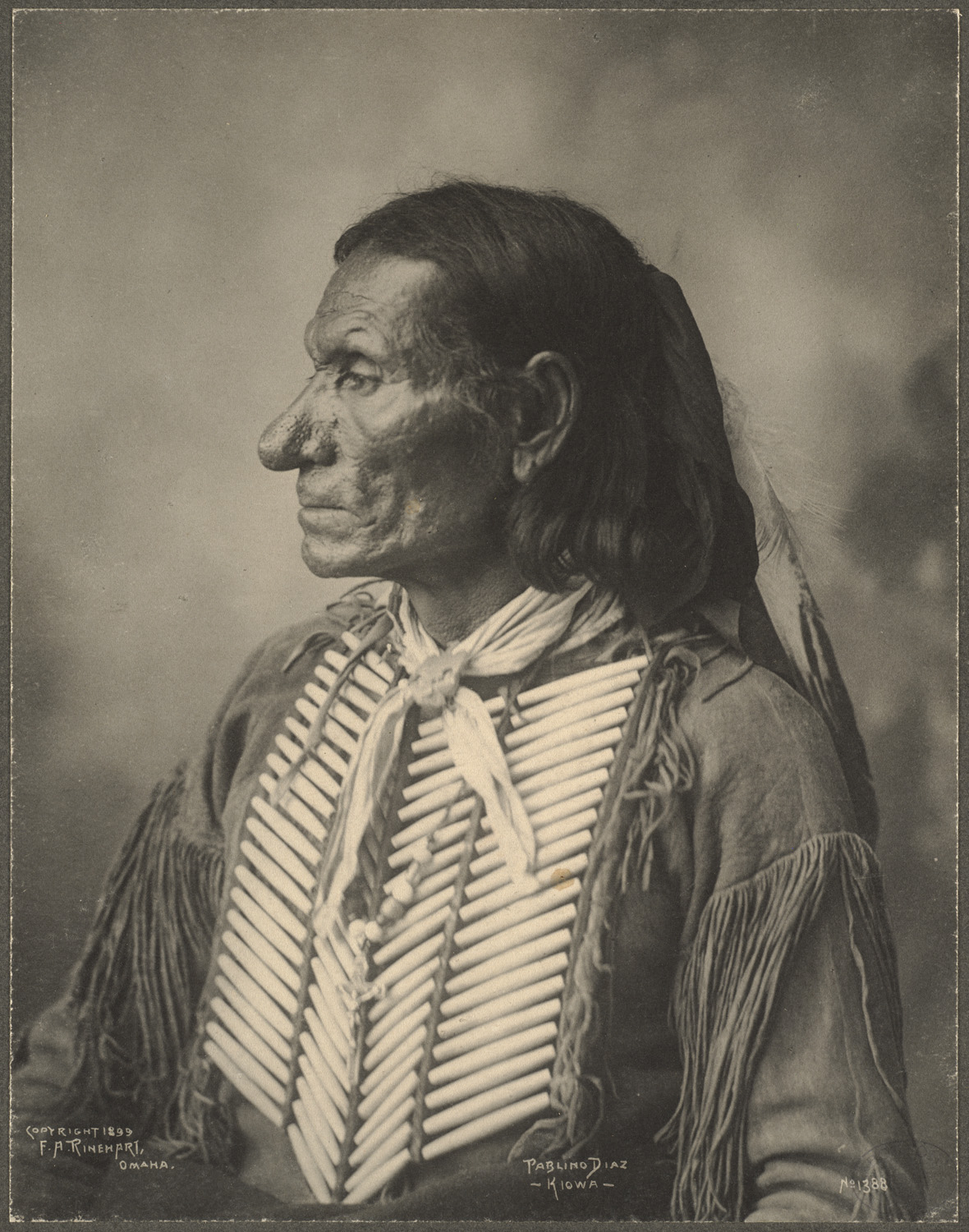
Pablino Diaz (Kiowa) wearing a hair pipe breastplate, 1899

A hair pipe is a term for an elongated bead, more than 1.5 inches (38 mm) long, which are popular with American Indians, particularly from the Great Plains and Northwest Plateau.

== History ==
In 1878, Joseph H. Sherburne became a trader to the Ponca people. The Ponca purchased great quantities of corn cob pipes from Sherburne, but only used the stem of the pipes as beads. White Eagle showed the trader a necklace made of the pipestems and asked if they could be ordered in bulk. Sherburne contacted S. A. Frost in New York about producing tubular bone beads and within a year, he had enough hair pipe beads to sell to the Ponca as well as other Indian traders.

== Pow-wow ==
Hair pipe beads were extremely popular from 1880–1910 and are still very common in powwow regalia today. These beads are used in chokers, breast plates, earrings, and necklaces worn by women and men.

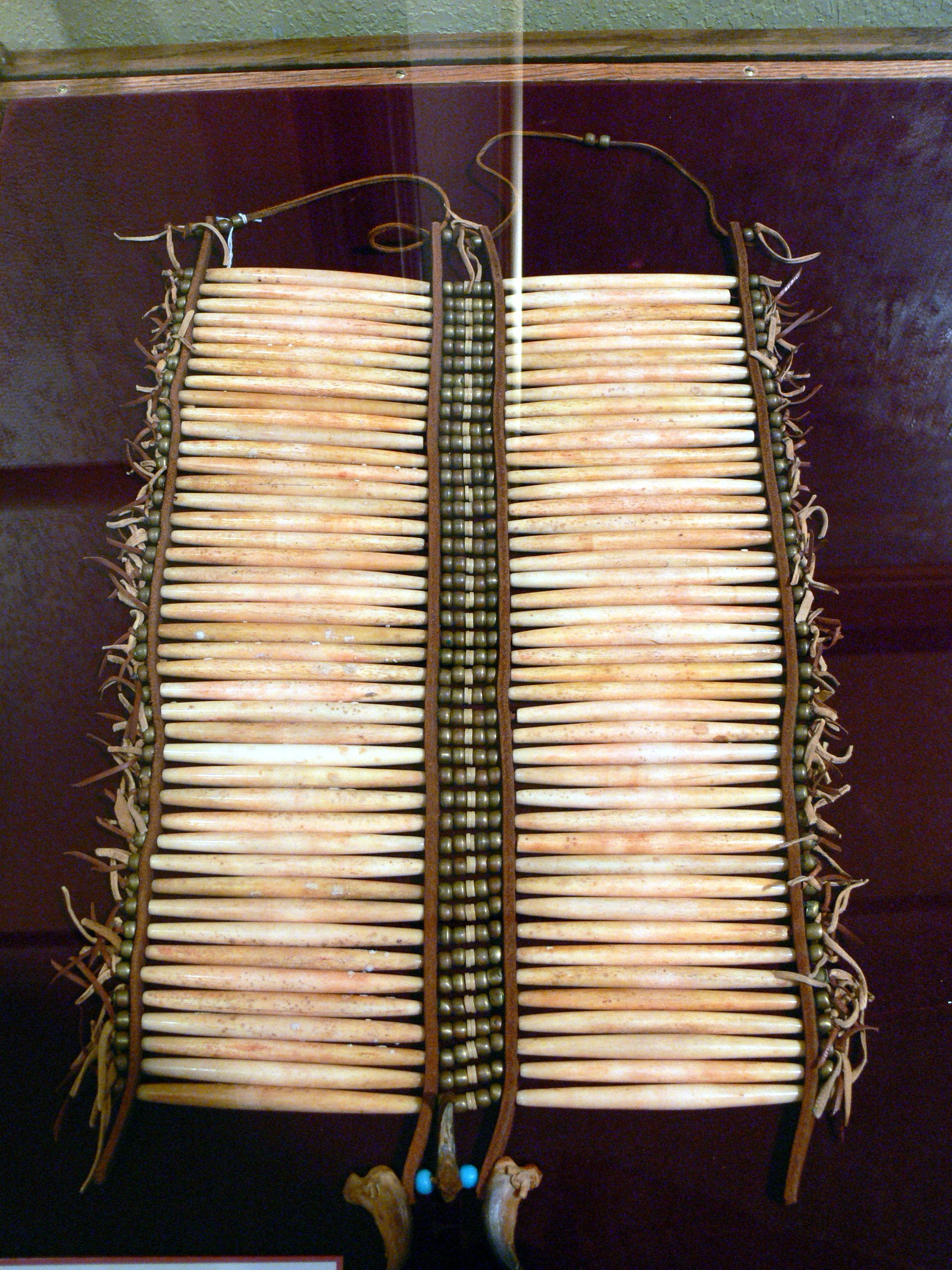
Blackfoot bone hair pipe breastplate, Woolaroc, Oklahoma, 1885
