= Swiss sword =

Swiss sword (Schweizerschwert) can refer to:

- the Swiss degen
- the broadsword used by the Swiss, see walloon sword
- the Swiss sabre

== See also ==
- Swiss arms and armour
