= Fascine knife =

17th–19th century infantry and artillery sidearm

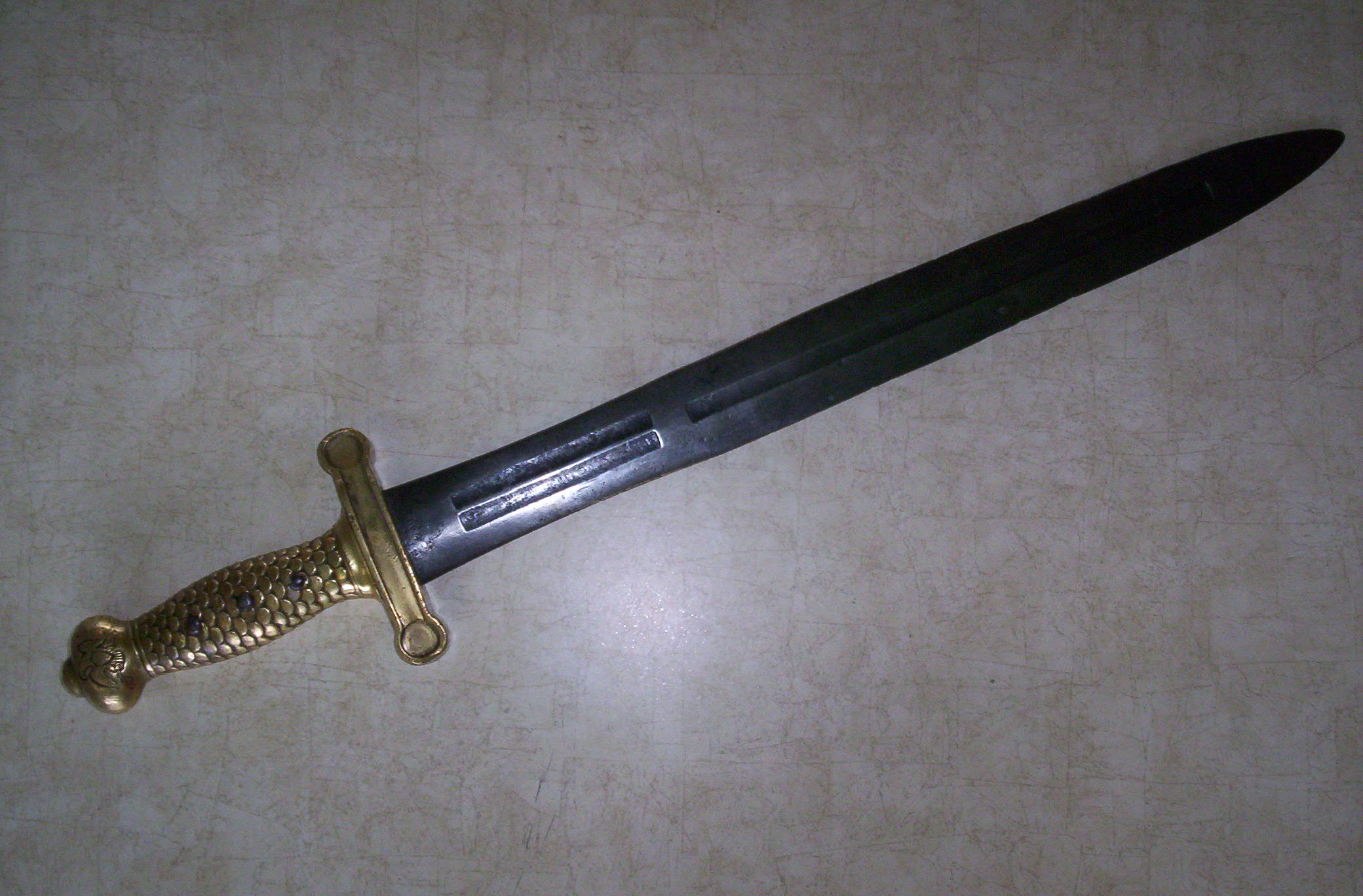
19th-century US fascine knife (Model 1832 Foot Artillery Sword)

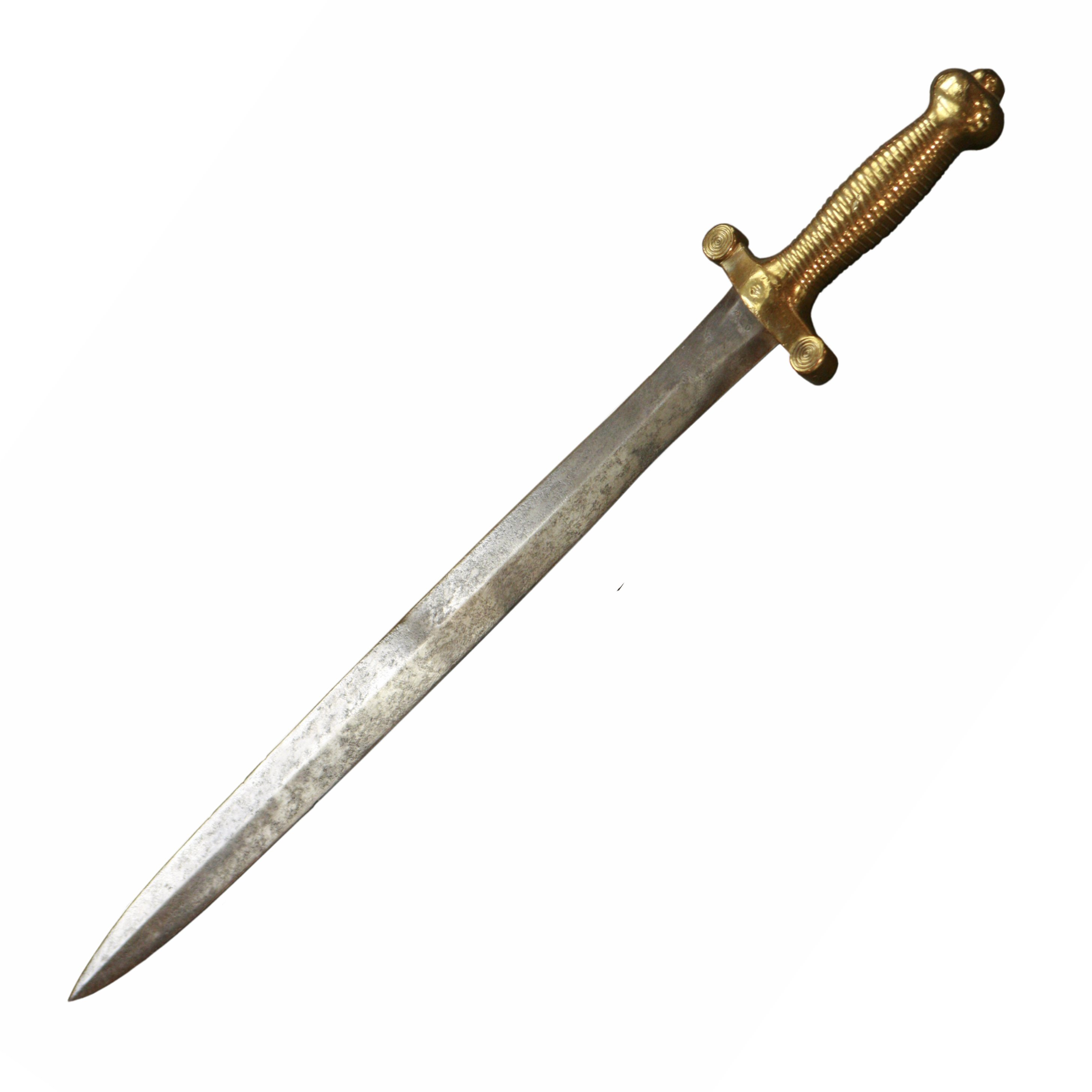
French infantry gladius, model 1831

The fascine knife was a side arm / tool issued to 17th to 19th century light infantry and artillery. It served both as a personal weapon and as a tool for cutting fascines (bundles of sticks used to strengthen the sides of trenches or earth ramparts protecting the batteries). It could be straight or curved, double edged or single edged with a sawtoothed back.

== History ==
Seventeenth- and 18th-century German, Prussian and Swedish fascine knives were more like cavalry swords, often with a brass handle and a hand guard, but later models were more like billhooks in shape and appearance. By the 20th century, it became the Pioneer's billhook in the British Army, used in World War I for making machine gun emplacements. In the Indian Army, it is known as a Knife Gabion (gabions, like fascines, are used for supporting earthworks).

Some types of fascine knife are probably descended from 16th century sidearms weapons like the baselard or the Swiss sword. Others, known to British foot soldiers as a billhook, are more closely related to agricultural cutting tools.

== Uses ==
Like the billhook they were used for cutting saplings (e.g. willow, hazel or chestnut) that were bundled up to make fascines or woven into hurdles, or gabions. Many revetments used a combination of all three, with fascines at the bottom of the trench, hurdles just below ground level and gabions above, filled with the earth from the trench.

Although the Spanish Army called its fascine knives machetes, they bore little resemblance to the common cutting tool.

== See also ==
- Bayonet
- Model 1816 French artillery short sword
- Model 1832 Foot Artillery Sword
