= Swiss degen =

15th and 16th century short sword

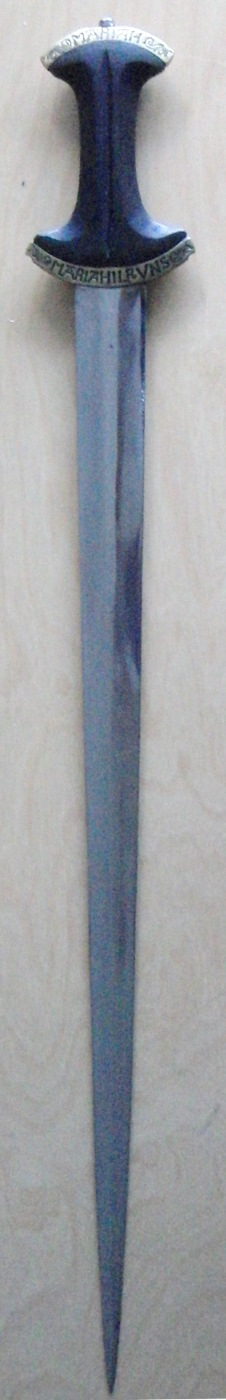
Replica of a Swiss degen of the 15th century (blade length 63 cm (25 in)). The curved guard is inscribed with an invocation Maria hilf uns ("Mary help us"). After an original kept in the Historical Museum of Bern.

The Swiss degen (Schweizerdegen) was a short sword (Degen), an elongated version of the Swiss dagger, with the same double-crescent shape of the guard. It was used as a type of side arm in the Old Swiss Confederacy and especially by Swiss mercenaries, from the first half of the 15th century until the mid 16th century. The native term used in the 15th century for this weapon was baselard. The term Schweizerdegen (as Early New High German Schwytzertägen) is first attested in 1499.

The blade length could be anywhere between 40 cm (16 in) and 70 cm (28 in). Although there was a general trend towards longer blades over time, this development was not linear and disparate blade lengths coexisted throughout the 15th century, and only in the 16th century a more or less discrete split between the short dagger (Dolch) and the long degen becomes evident.

These weapons were widely worn both by soldiers and by civilians. They were very popular with the Swiss mercenary pikemen throughout the late 15th and early 16th century. Degen were not usually issued as ordnance weapons, but purchased privately as secondary weapons by soldiers. For this reason, there never emerged a definite standard form, and variations in hilt and blade design remained the rule from their inception in the 13th century until the weapon's decline in the 17th century.

The Cgm 558 Fechtbuch (Hugo Wittenwiler) mentions a few techniques for unarmed defense against an attack with a basler (Swiss degen). Use of the weapon has parallels to the fencing with the German Messer, and indeed the section on the basler in Wittenwiler's treatise takes the place of the Messer section in comparable German manuscripts (Wittenwiler treats basler techniques alongside the longsword, rondel dagger (tegen), Swiss dagger (kurzes messer) and unarmed ringen).

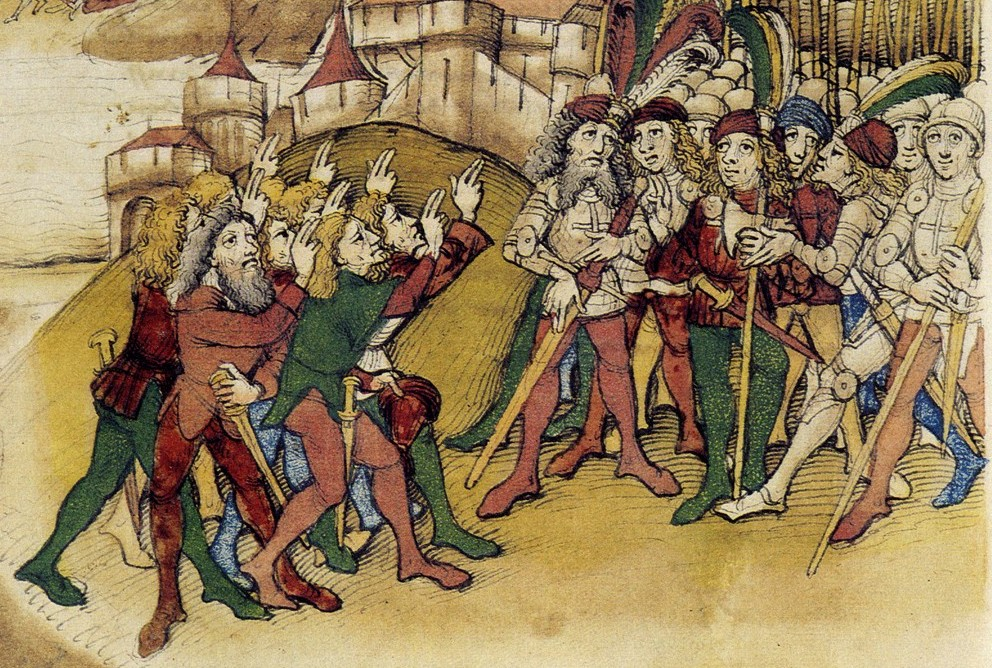
Scene of Hasle swearing fealty to Bern, from the Spiezer Chronik (1480s). Several men of either party are wearing the classical Swiss degen of the late 15th century.

== See also ==
- Baselard
- Swiss arms and armour
- Swiss saber
- List of sword types
- List of daggers
- Fascine knife
