= Gladius =

Roman short sword; Latin word meaning "sword"

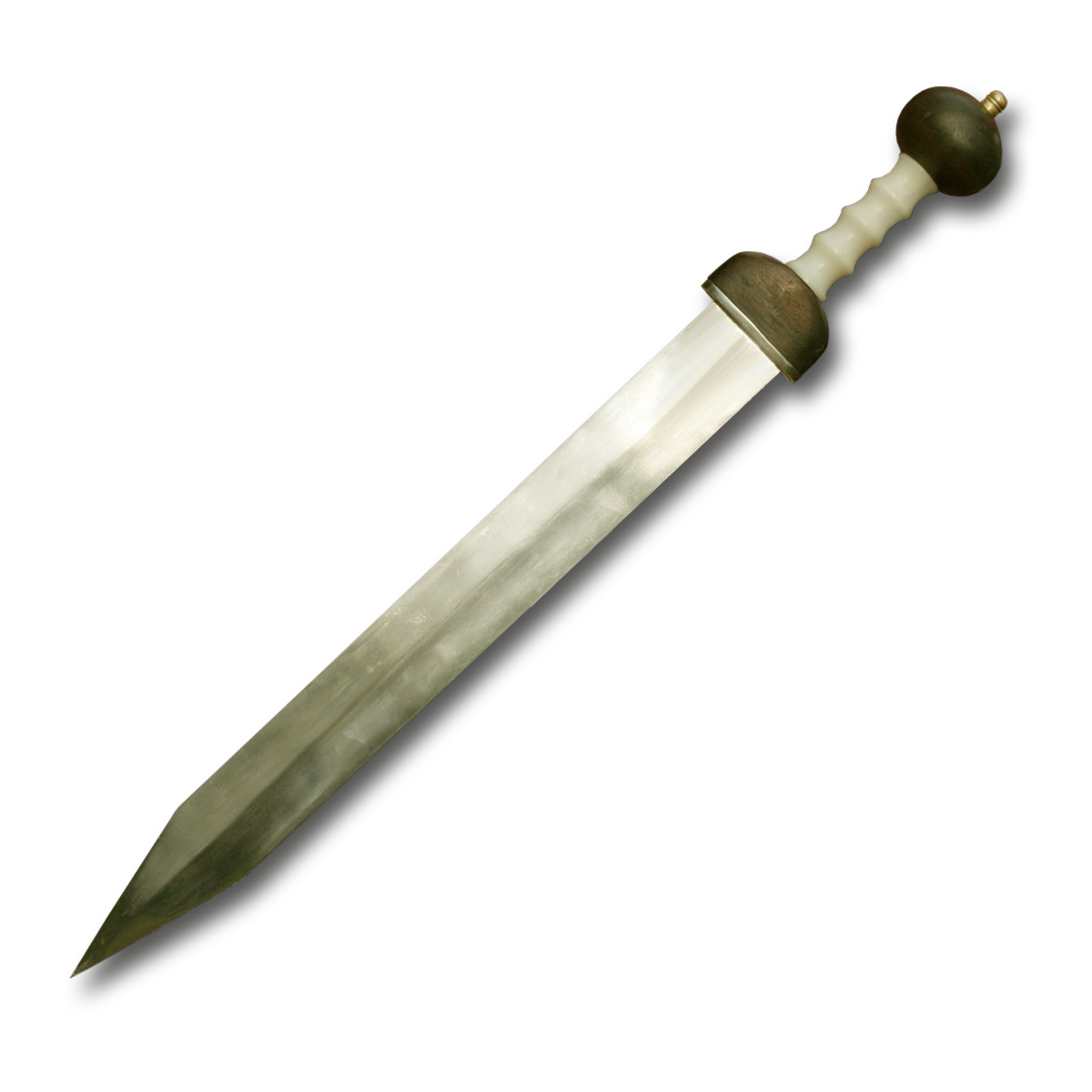
- Replica Pompeii gladius
- Type: Sword
- Place of origin: Carthaginian Spain as the Celtiberian sword, adopted and modified by Rome

Service history
- In service: 3rd century BC – 3rd century AD
- Used by: Roman Infantry during the wars of the Roman Republic and Roman Empire

Specifications
- Mass: 1.2–1.6 kg (2.6–3.5 lb)
- Blade length: 37.5–65 cm (14.8–25.6 in)
- Width: 3.6–9 cm (1.4–3.5 in)
- Blade type: Iron of varying degrees of carbon content, pointed, double-edged
- Hilt type: Wood, bronze or ivory

Gladius (Classical Latin: [ˈɡɫadiʊs]) is a Latin word properly referring to the type of sword that was used by ancient Roman foot soldiers starting from the 3rd century BC and until the 3rd century AD. Linguistically, within Latin, the word also came to mean "sword", regardless of the type used. Early ancient Roman swords were similar to those of the Greeks, called xiphe (pl., sing.: xiphos). From the 3rd century BC, however, the Romans adopted a weapon based on the sword of the Celtiberians of Hispania in service to Carthage during the Punic Wars, known in Latin as the gladius hispaniensis, meaning "Hispanic-type sword". The Romans modified it depending on how their battle units waged war, and created over time new types of "gladii" such as the Mainz gladius and the Pompeii gladius. Finally, in the third century AD the heavy Roman infantry replaced the gladius with the spatha (already common among Roman cavalrymen), relegating the gladius as a weapon for light Roman infantry.

== Etymology ==
Gladius is generally believed to be a Celtic loan in Latin (perhaps via an Etruscan intermediary), derived from ancient Celtic *kladi(b)os or *kladimos "sword" (whence modern Welsh cleddyf "sword", modern Breton klezeff, Old Irish claideb/Modern Irish claidheamh [itself perhaps a loan from Welsh]; the root of the word may survive in the Old Irish verb claidid "digs, excavates" and anciently attested in the Gallo-Brittonic place name element cladia/clado "ditch, trench, valley hollow").

== Origins ==
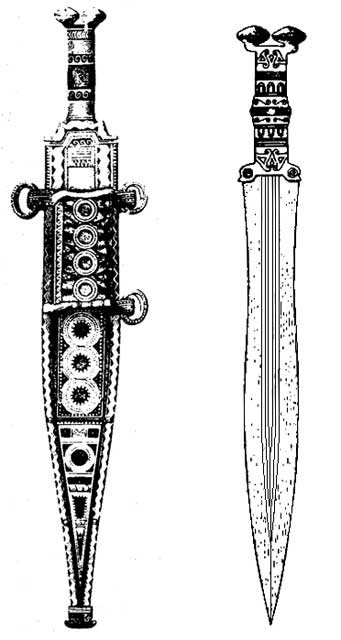
A sword of the Iron Age Cogotas II culture in Spain.

According to Polybius, the sword used by the Roman army during the Battle of Telamon in 225 BC, though deemed superior to the cumbersome Gallic swords, was mainly useful to thrust. These thrusting swords used before the adoption of the Gladius were possibly based on the Greek xiphos. The Suda describes the adoption of this design by the Romans even before the end of the Second Punic War, which Polybius reaffirms by calling the later Roman sword (Iberian sword Ancient Greek: βηρικὴ µάχαιρα iberikē máchairain) It is believed Scipio Africanus was the promoter of the change after the Battle of Cartagena in 209 BC, after which he set the inhabitants to produce weapons for the Roman army.

== Manufacturing ==
A large part about the manufacturing methods of the Roman short sword is based on scientific analysis of surviving examples. In his work Mechanicae syntaxis Philon of Byzantium explained how the Celtiberian sword were made and how it differed from that of the gladius Hispaniensis:

ταύτας γὰρ ὅταν βούλωνται δοκιμάζειν εἰ χρησταί εἰσιν, ἐπιλαβόμενοι τῇ μὲν δεξιᾷ χειρὶ τῆς λαβῆς, τῇ δὲ ἄλλῃ τοῦ ἄκρου τῆς μαχαίρας καὶ ἐπὶ τὴν κεφαλὴν θέντες πλαγίαν αὐτὴν κατάγουσιν ἐξ ἑκατέρου μέρους, ἕως ἂν τῶν ὤμων ἅψωνται, μετά δὲ ταῦτα ἀνῆκαν ὀξέως ἀπάραντες ἀμφοτέρας τὰς χεῖρας· ἡ δὲ ἀφεθεῖσα ἀπορθοῦται πάλιν καὶ οὕτως ἐπὶ τὸν ἐξ ἀρχῆς ῥυθμὸν ἀποκαθίσταται, ὥστε μηδεμίαν ἔννοιαν καμπῆς ἔχειν· καὶ ταῦτα πλεονάκις ποιούντων ὀρθαὶ διαμένουσιν.

Then, to test whether they are useful, the handle is taken with the right hand, the point of the sword with the other, putting it over the head and pulling it down on both sides until touching the shoulders. Then it is quickly let go, withdrawing both hands, the released sword straightening once more and returning to its former shape, showing no sign of curvature. Even with frequent repetition of this experiment, they remain straight.

—

There were several methods for forging a gladius. In some cases, harder (higher-carbon steel) edges were simply forge-welded to softer (lower-carbon iron) cores to provide a combination of flexibility and strength in a blade. Other were made by wrapping a layer of steel around an iron core by forge-welding. Another gladius found at Bonn, seemed to be formed of medium-carbon steel throughout and had not been quenched. It is possible that it was assembled from several parts, but if that is the case, it was welded by a skilled blacksmith in such a way that this is not apparent. A blade from the Republican period was found to have a harder core and softer edges, which would have made minor blade damage easier to repair without the need for a forge. During the Republican period, the manufacture of swords was probably largely outsourced to civilians. In contrast, during the Imperial period, the army produced their swords themselves.

== Use ==
Roman legionaries received a carefully (Latin: armatura weapon training) in which they learned to strike not with the edge, but to stab with the point of the sword. (Note: According to Vegetius, a slash rarely results in fatal injuries because the vital organs are protected by both armor and bone. A stab that penetrates two inches deep will inevitably strike organs and is therefore lethal. Furthermore, when executing a slash, the right arm and flank are unprotected; a stab, on the other hand, is delivered while the body remains protected.) During combat, the legionary would adopt a slight crouched position with his left foot forward. He would hold the scutum horizontally in front of him with his left hand and the gladius in his right.

Keeping the scutum close to his body not only provided ideal cover, but also increased the range of his punch. To present as small a target as possible, the legionary turned his body slightly in profile to his opponent. From this stable stance, he would direct all his body weight, into a punch with his shield. Following the punch, the legionary advanced with his right foot and delivered an upward jab with the gladius, holding the blade horizontally. (Note: Although the right shoulder contributed to the power of the thrust, it was the rotation of the legionary's hips as he stepped forward that provided the real power.)

There were two methods of combat proactive and reactive fighting. The first method required the first blow to be struck, probably by overwhelming the opponent with the scutum. The second method involved deflecting an opponent's sword strike with the scutum. This required the shield to be moved a little way to block the blow, with the metal binding on its upper edge. This method enabled the legionary to parry and punch simultaneously while getting closer for the fatal stab.

== Variations ==
=== Gladius Hispaniensis ===
The gladius hispaniensis is based on the Celtiberian short sword. Early finds from Osuna, La Osera, and Quintana de Gormaz have curved hand guards, two-lobed, atrophied pommels, and scabbards with two to three suspension rings. Measuring up to 65 cm, the gladius hispaniensis was initially unusually large (used by both infantry and cavalry) before the more common lengths of the Imperial period developed. The length of the blade confirms the accounts of Polybius and Livy, which point to the primary function of the gladius hispaniensis as a slashing weapon. Another indication of the unusual size of the gladius hispaniensis is provided by a joke told by Cicero and recorded by Macrobius: (Quis, inquit, generum meum ad gladium alligavit. Who tied my son-in-law to his gladius?) — when he saw him (Cornelius Lentulus Dolabella, who was apparently not particularly tall) with his sword at his belt.

=== Mainz Gladius ===
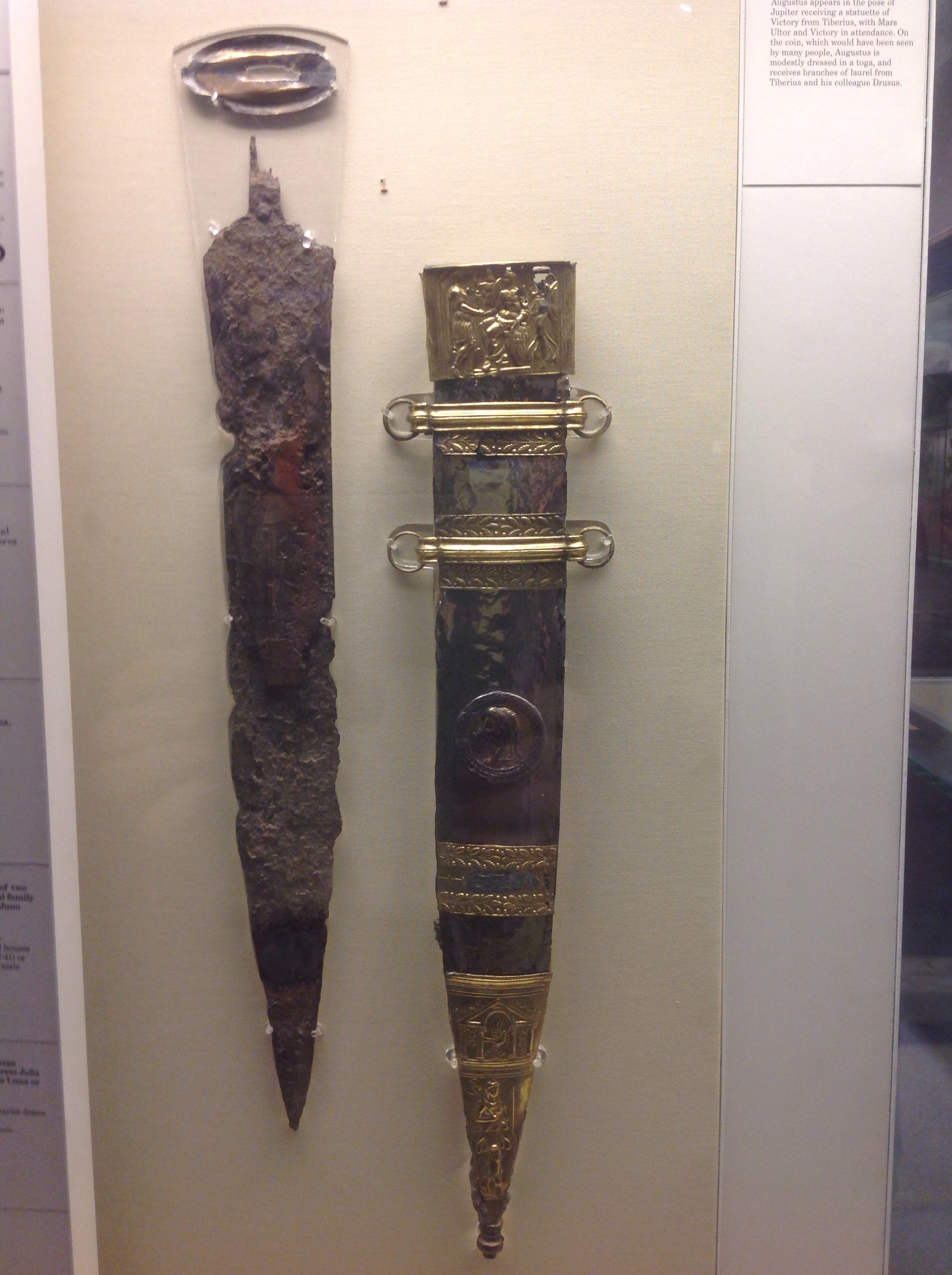
The Mainz Gladius on display at the British Museum, London

The Mainz-type gladius can be traced from the late 1st century B.C. to the late 1st century A.D. Gladii that have been found measured 425–590 mm in length, 36–90 mm in width, and weighed between 1.2 and 1.6 kg. The hilts of the Mainz gladii, as with all gladii, consist of three main parts: the handguard with a guard plate, the actual grip, and the pommel. The blade tang runs through all three parts and is riveted above the brass knob that crowns the pommel. The oval guard plate is made of bronze or brass. The hand guard is wide, flat, and bell-shaped. The pommel, which is transversely ellipsoidal or double-spherical, is made of wood, like the hand guard. The grip is made of bone, has a hexagonal cross-section, and tapers slightly toward the pommel. In addition, the grip features four grooves, which may be absent on early examples. The Mainz-type sword scabbard consisted of wood covered with leather, which in turn could be overlaid with metal.

Beginning in the Augustan period (around 23 B.C.), a new type of brass alloy orichalcum (80% copper, 20% zinc) became the preferred material. Since this metal closely resembled gold in appearance and was also used to mint imperial coins beginning around 23 B.C., had a high material value. To maximize the visual effect, the brass sheets were sometimes hot-dip galvanized or coated with liquid tin. This created a silvery, corrosion-resistant surface. The metal fittings were adorned with openwork recesses (opus interrasile) and embossed, pressed, or stamped ornaments in the Hellenistic-Roman style. Finds on the tombstones of ordinary legionaries confirm that richly decorated scabbards were widespread, although simpler types of scabbards containing little metal must also have been used alongside them.

=== Fulham gladius ===
Although the Fulham-type gladius generally corresponds to the Mainz type, it represents a transitional form to the Pompeii type. The Fulham gladius is slightly lighter and shorter, and the transition from the broad, curved portion of the blade to the still very long and narrow tip is somewhat more abrupt and angular than in the Mainz type. The guard is taller and resembles a flat truncated pyramid with a slight central edge. The pommel can range from disc-shaped to hexagonal with a distinct central ridge. The Fulham-type gladius has a blade 52 cm long, 6.8 cm wide at the hilt, and 6 cm wide at the front widening. It is 74 cm long, including the hilt, and weighs 1.2 kg.

=== Pompeii gladius ===
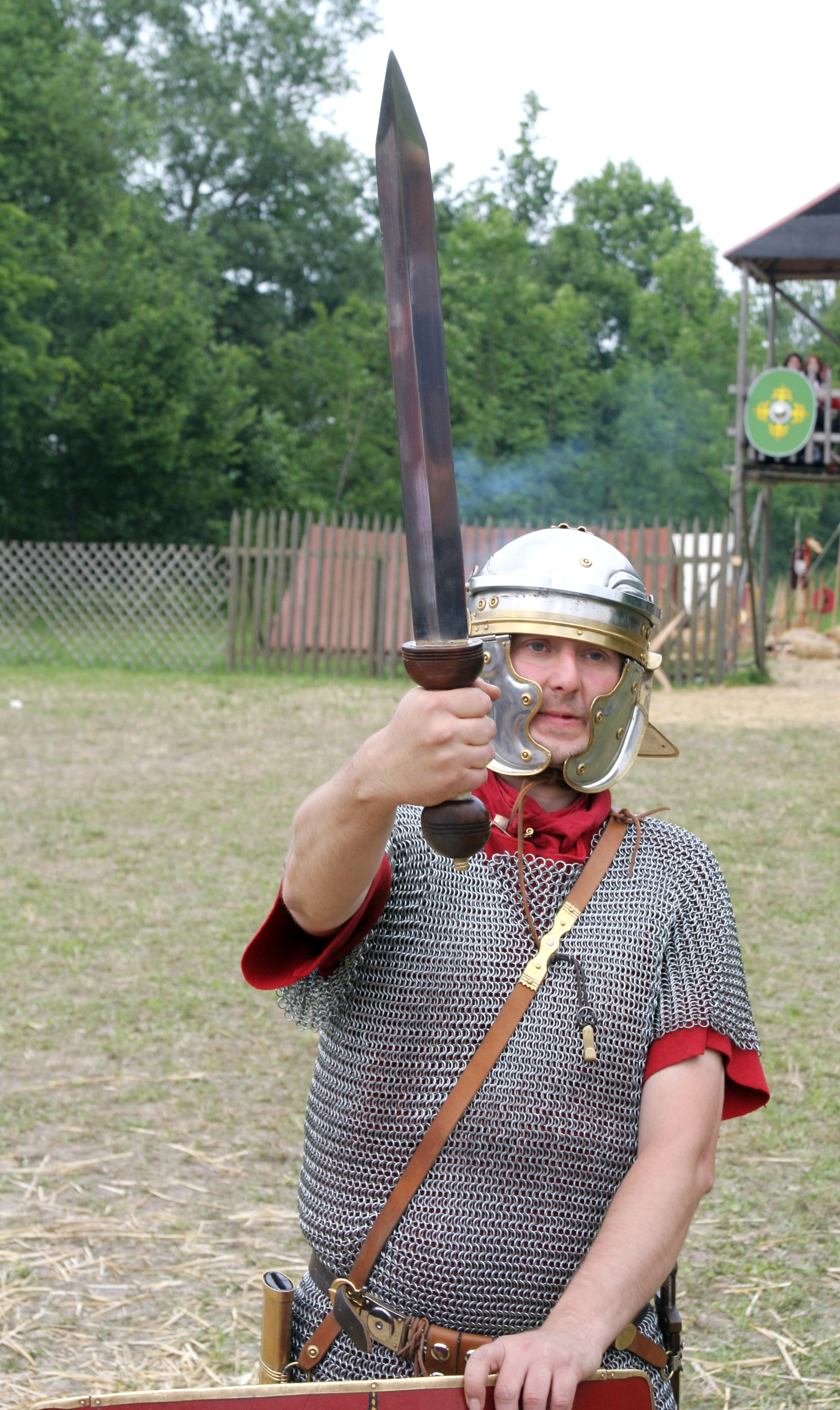
Re-enactor with Pompeii-type gladius

The Pompeii-type gladius first appeared in the middle of the 1st century AD. Deriving its name from finds in various locations in and around Pompeii, this new type of sword had a parallel-edged blade and a short point, resembling a shorter version of the spatha. Three main types of Pompeii-type blade have been identified: the Classic, Putensen-Vimose and Hamfelde variants. The majority of the first type were found within the Roman Empire, while the other two types were mainly found outside its borders. Some of these variants feature a bullet tip, which was probably meant to enhance penetration when stabbing.

In general, Pompeii-type gladii are smaller than Mainz-type gladii, both in length and width varying from approximately 37.5 cm to 56.5 cm and 35 mm to 70 mm, respectively, and they are usually square-edged. Like Mainz-type, Pompeii-type blades had square shoulders. weighing slightly less than the Mainz-type. Although retaining the ribbed, hexagonal hand grip, the pommels of the Pompeii type were sometimes more spherical in shape, while the hand guards became almost hemispherical.

The scabbards of the Pompeii type appeared in fewer forms than the Mainz type. The scabbard was made of wood covered in leather on the outside. Opposite to the Mainz type, they did not incorporate guttering around the entire blade. Immediately beneath the mouth plate at the top of the scabbard was a locket plate, which was usually embellished with an engraved and pierced motif, typically of a mythological nature. The plate was split into two fields by one suspension band and had a second one at its base, each of them riveted to the U-sectioned guttering that ran alongside the locket plate.

At the foot of the scabbard was a V-shaped chape fitted with U-sectioned guttering, finished on either side at the top with stylised palmettes and a triangular plate. These were all similarly decorated with engraved and pierced motifs. At the centre of the scabbard, just above the chape, another stylised palmette had been riveted on. An alternative version of the scabbard decoration featured eleven pairs of studs (approximately 15 mm in diameter, closely resembling those worn on the 'apron' straps of infantry), positioned along a vertical line between the locket plate and the chape. Another find at Herculaneum depicts scabbard adornment consisting of a chain of embellished plaques affixed to its exterior. A further type preferred simple geometric piercings to mythological scenes for scabbard plate decoration.

== See also ==
- Iron Age sword
- Model 1816 French artillery short sword
- Model 1832 foot artillery sword
- Qama
- Roman military personal equipment

== Bibliography ==
- Humphrey, John William; Oleson, John Peter; Sherwood, Andrew Neil (1998). Greek and Roman Technology: a Sourcebook. London: Routledge. ISBN 0-415-06136-9.
- Livy (1982). Rome and Italy: Books VI-X of the History of Rome from its Foundation, translated by Betty Radice. Penguin Books. ISBN 978-0-14-044388-2.
- Junkelmann, Marcus (1986). Die Legionen des Augustus. Mainz: Philipp von Zabern. ISBN 3-8053-0886-8.
- Koch, John C. (2006). "A-Celti". Celtic Culture A Historical Encyclopedia. Vol. I. Santa Barbara: ABC-CLIO. ISBN 978-1-85109-440-0.
- Bishop, M.C. (2016). The Gladius: The Roman Short Sword. Oxford: Osprey Publishing. ISBN 978-1-4728-1585-9.
- Schrijver, Peter (1991). The Reflexes of the Proto-Indo-European Laryngeals in Latin. Leiden Studies in Indo-European. Vol. II. Leiden: Brill. ISBN 978-90-5183-308-9.
- Delamarre, Xavier (2003). Dictionnaire de la langue gauloise. Paris: Errance. ISBN 978-2-8777-2631-3.
- Taylor, Michael J. (2014). "Roman Infantry Tactics in the Mid-Republic: A Reassessment". Historia: Zeitschrift für Alte Geschichte. 63 (3). Stuttgart: Franz Steiner Verlag. JSTOR 24432811.
- Penrose, Jane (2008). Rome and Her Enemies: An Empire Created and Destroyed by War. Oxford: Osprey Publishing. ISBN 978-1-84603-336-0.
- Fields, Nic (2012). Roman Republican Legionary 298-105 BC. Oxford: Osprey Publishing. ISBN 978-1-84908-781-0.
- Davies, Roy W. (1989). Service in the Roman Army. Edinburgh: Edinburgh University Press. ISBN 0-85224-495-9.
- Vegetius (2001). Epitoma rei militaris [Epitome of Military Science]. Liverpool: Liverpool University Press. ISBN 0-85323-910-X.
- Gabriel, Richard A. (2017). Great Generals of the Ancient World: The Personality, Intellectual and Leadership Traits that made them Great. Barnsley: Pen & Sword. ISBN 978-1-47385-908-1.
- Ellis, Peter Berresford (1998). Celt and Roman: The Celts of Italy. New York City: St. Martin's Press. ISBN 0-312-21419-7.
- Sprague, Martina (2009). A History of Edged Weapon Warfare. Yardley: Westholme Publishing. ISBN 978-1-59416-101-8.
- Polybius (1977). Ἱστορίαι [Histoires]. Translated by Weil, Raymond. Paris: Les Belles Lettres.
- Williams, Alan (2012). The Sword and the Crucible: A History of the Metallurgy of European Swordsup to the 16th Century. History of Warfare. Vol. 77. Leiden: Brill. ISBN 978-90-04-22783-5.
- Philon of Byzantium (1892). Philonis Mechanicae syntaxis libri quartus et quintus [The Syntax of Philon's Mechanics, Books Four and Five]. Berlin: Georg Reimer.
