= SS-Ehrendolch =

Schutzstaffel (SS) honour weapon

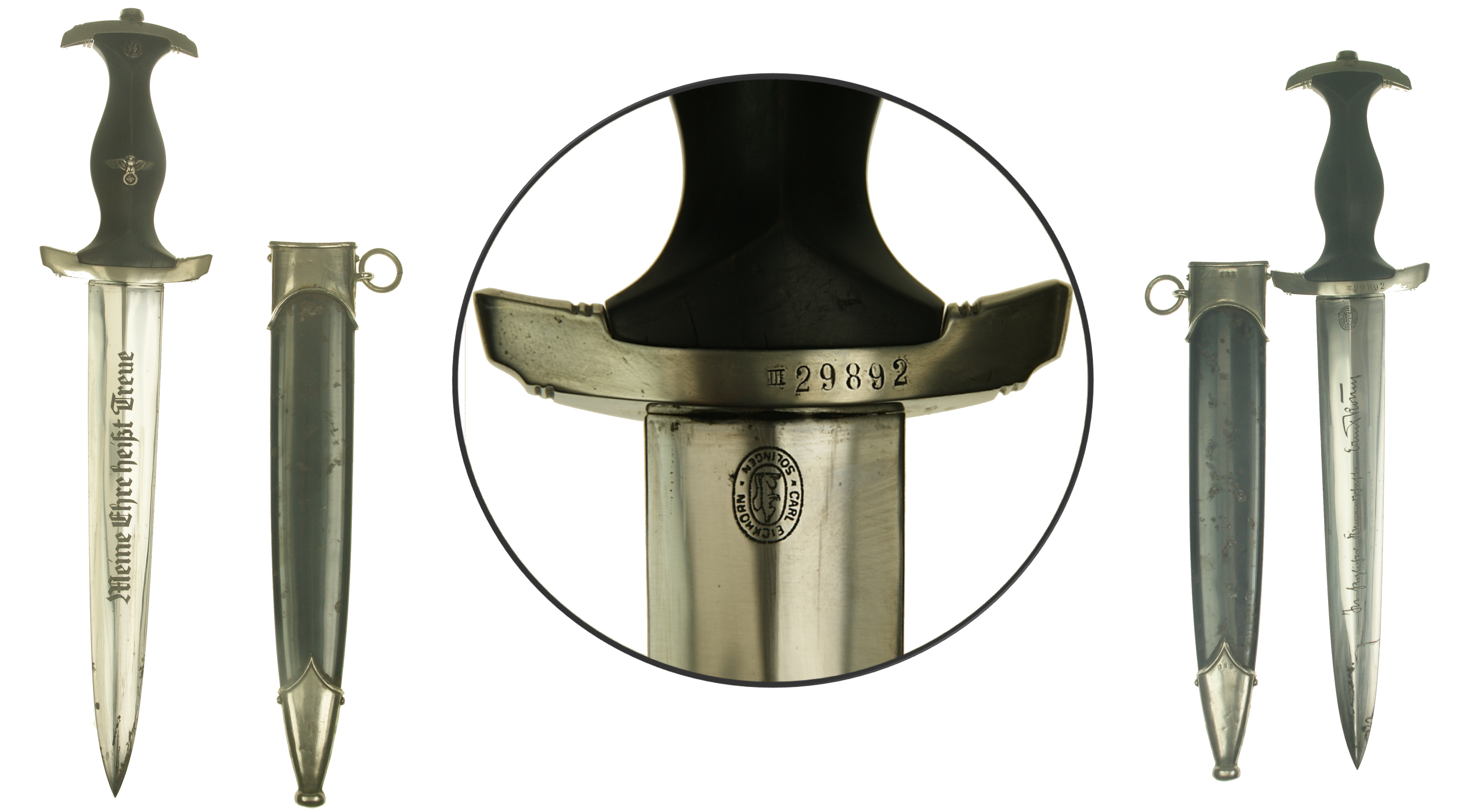
- SS-Ehrendolch belonging to Hermann Pister (SS-Number 29892) manufactured in Solingen
- Type: Ceremonial weapon

Service history
- Used by: Schutzstaffel

Production history
- Produced: 1933–1940

Specifications
- Blade type: Single-edged, straight bladed.

The SS-Ehrendolch (German for "SS honour dagger") was a ceremonial weapon of the Schutzstaffel (SS).

== Introduction and ceremony ==
SS daggers were introduced in December 1933, following analogous traditions in the Reichswehr, the Luftwaffe, and Reichsmarine, and awarded to celebrate the final introduction of the SS-men into the Allgemeine SS, SS-Totenkopfverbände units, and SS-Verfügungstruppe (later known as the Waffen-SS) every year. The daggers were given out at an awarding ceremony that took place on 9 November, the official founding date of the SS, which was conducted according to strict rules developed by Heinrich Himmler. In addition to this dagger there was also the SS Honour Ring (Ehrenring) and SS Honour Sword (Degen).

The honour dagger was an official sidearm of the SS dress uniform used by all full members of the SS. Production was suspended in 1940.

== Appearance and design ==
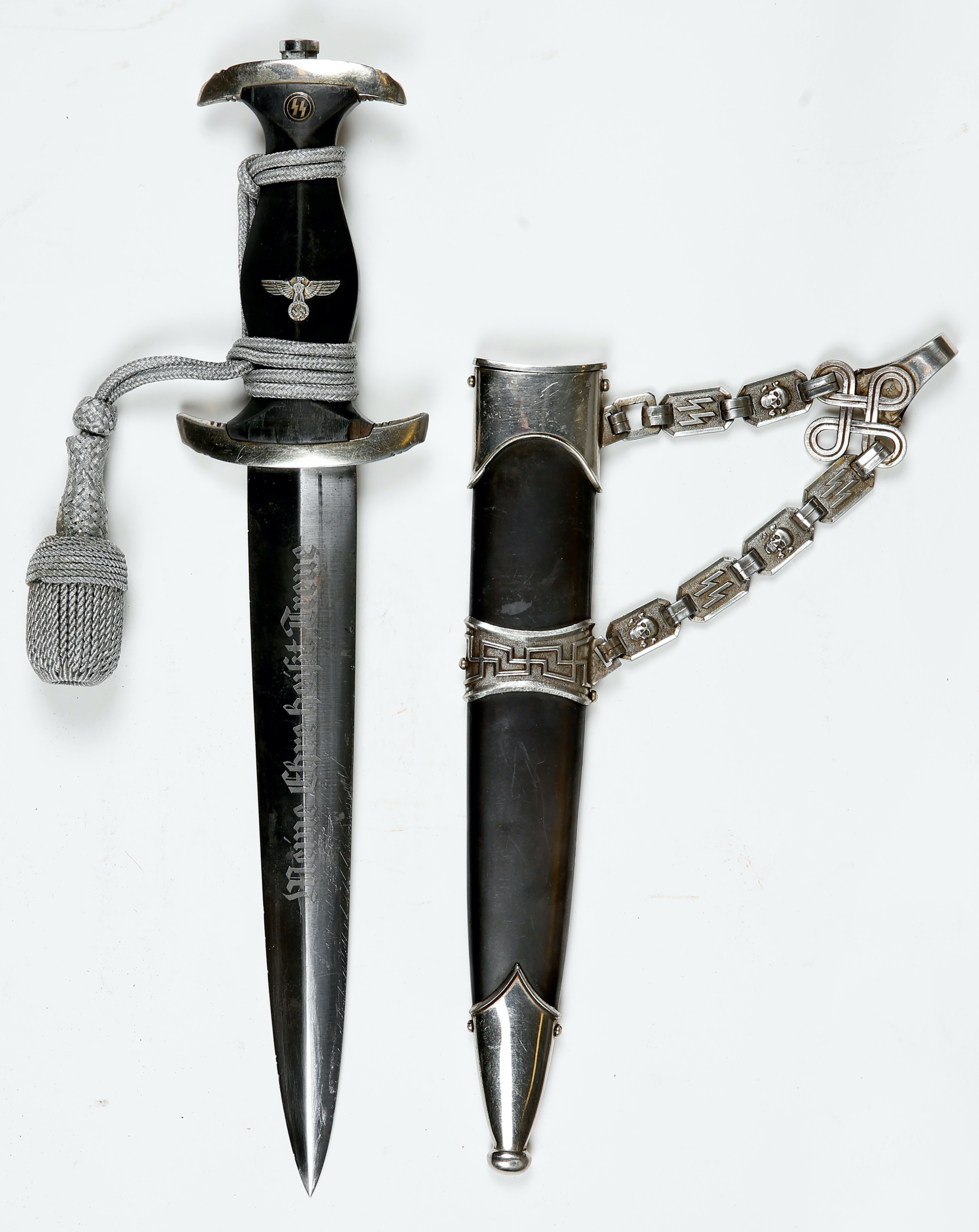
SS-Ehrendolch M-1936 with Meine Ehre heißt Treue inscription on the blade

The design of the dagger was based on the 16th century Swiss dagger. The centre of the wide and long spear-pointed blade has a very pronounced rib. The official motto of the SS Meine Ehre heißt Treue ("My honour is loyalty") was etched along the longer axis of the blade.

The crossguard and pommel were nickel-plated; the handle was black inlaid with the silver Parteiadler eagle and the SS symbol. The metal scabbard was covered in black gloss lacquer with silver-plated chape and mount. The SS dagger was introduced in 1933 and there are three distinctive versions available, depending on the year of manufacturing.

- Early production: 1933-1935: Manufacturer's logo, black burnished ebony handle, hilt with Roman numerals (I-Munich, II-Dresden, III-Berlin);
- Middle production: 1936-1938: Manufacturer's log with RZM code (double labeling), scabbard burnished or painted black, no Roman numerals on the guard;
- Late production: 1938-1942: Only with RZM code, scabbard painted black, eagle insignia on handle usually made of aluminium.

=== Design for the "old fighters" ===
On 21 June 1936, another variant of the dagger was introduced, which was awarded only to Alte Kämpfer — officers who had joined the SS before the Nazis came to power in 1933. This dagger was identical to the 1933 model, but the scabbard was fitted with a chain made of rectangular plaques adorned with Totenkopf skulls and SS runes and an additional silver fitting with swastika motif.

High-ranking SS leaders were presented a special dagger bearing the inscription In herzlicher Kameradschaft, H. Himmler ("In warm camaraderie, H. Himmler"). There were numerous variants of this dagger, which were handed to the recipients by Himmler himself. These gift daggers were identical to the general-issue daggers, but were made of top quality materials and had gilded inscriptions. They were and still are considered a rarity due to the low number issued.

== Carrying method ==
The SS honour daggers were usually worn with the black SS uniform. According to Himmler, every SS member was obliged to use the dagger against anyone who had violated the honour of the SS or offended the honour or the family of the SS member. In November 1935, Himmler issued a decree stating that "every SS man has the right and duty to defend his honour with the weapon."

As of 15 February 1943, all officers of the Waffen-SS were entitled to wear this dagger also with the field-grey dress uniforms. For these occasions, the dagger was fitted with a tassel and sword knot made of aluminium lace, similar to one used by Wehrmacht officers.

== SA-Dienstdolch ==
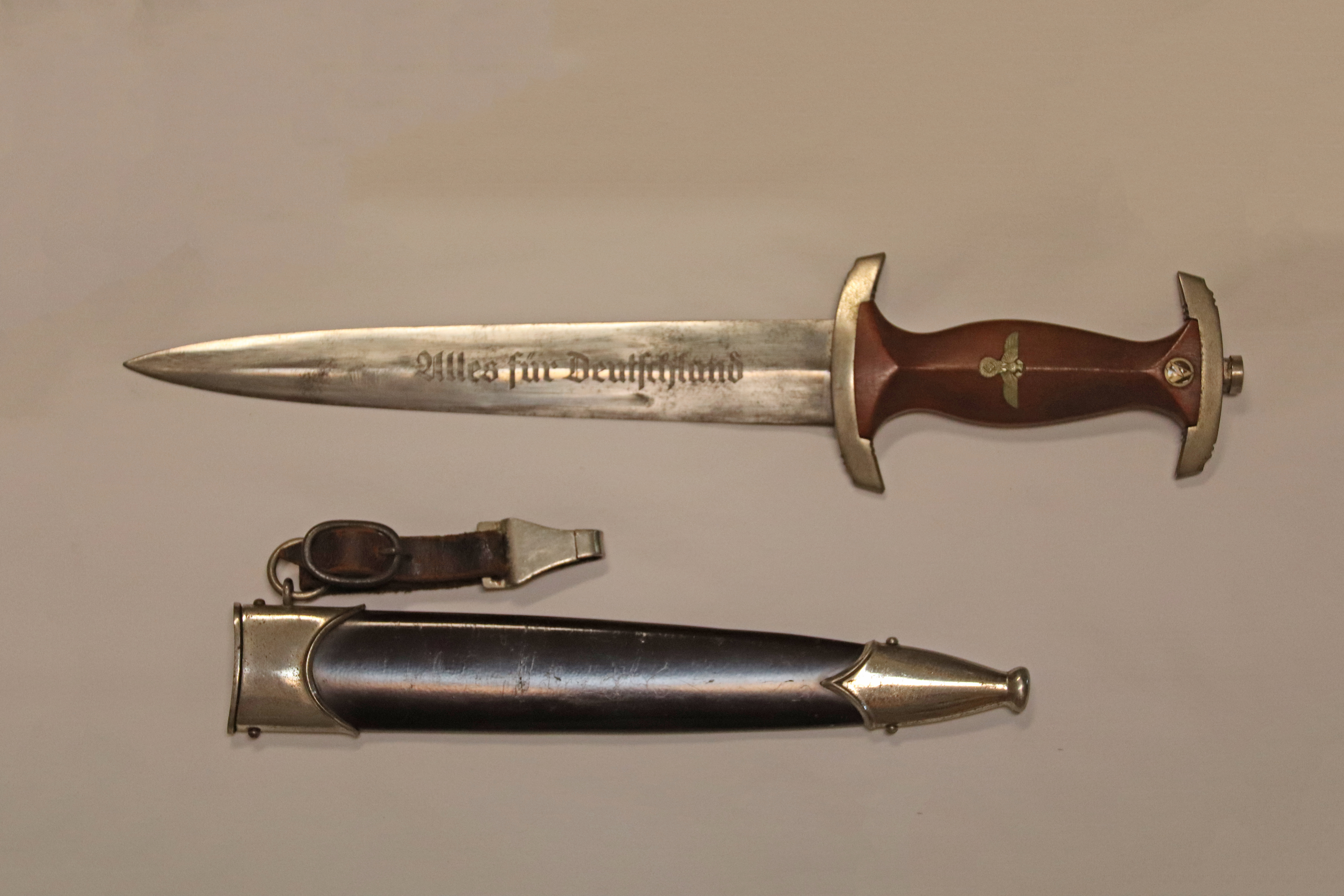
SA-Dienstdolch dagger with the inscription Alles für Deutschland on the blade

An SA-Dienstdolch (SA service dagger) of similar appearance and design existed for the Sturmabteilung (the Nazi Party's original paramilitary wing) members. The slogan Alles für Deutschland ("Everything for Germany") was etched along the longer axis of the blade. In 1934, SA chief Ernst Röhm introduced an SA honorary dagger based on the SS model, with the inscription In herzlicher Kameradschaft, Ernst Röhm ("In warm camaraderie, Ernst Röhm"). Following the Night of the Long Knives, SA members awarded with this dagger were ordered to remove Röhm's name from it.
