= Model 1832 foot artillery sword =

Civil war artillery sword
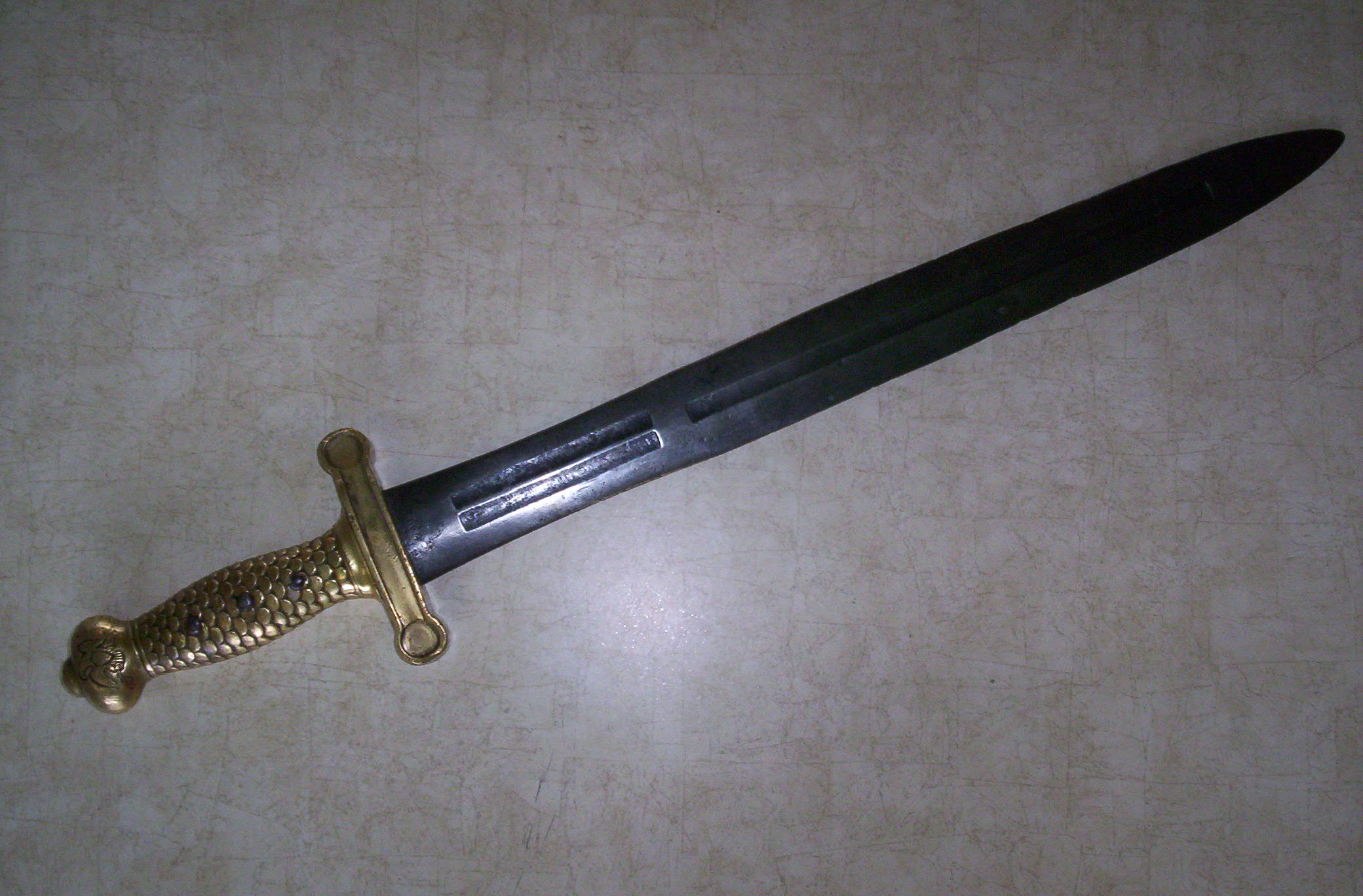
- Type: Short-sword
- Place of origin: United States of America

Service history
- In service: 1832–1872
- Used by: United States Army; Confederate States Army; Texan military
- Wars: Second Seminole War; Mexican-American War; American Civil War

Production history
- Manufacturer: Ames Manufacturing Company
- No. built: 16,200

Specifications
- Length: 25 in (640 mm)
- Blade length: 19 in (480 mm)
- Blade type: Double-edged, steel
- Hilt type: Brass
- Scabbard/sheath: Leather scabbard

The Model 1832 foot artillery sword was a 25-inch (64 cm) short-sword with a straight, double-edged blade and brass-mounted leather scabbard.

== History ==
The U.S. Model 1832 foot artillery short-sword has a 6-inch (15 cm) solid brass hilt, a 4-inch (10 cm) crossguard, and a blade usually 19 inches (48 cm) in length. This model was the first sword contracted by the U.S. with the Ames Manufacturing Company of Springfield (later Chicopee), Massachusetts, with production starting in 1832. In later years, it was also imported and supplied by W.H. Horstmann & Sons of Philadelphia, Pennsylvania. As a personal side arm, it was intended for use by the regular or foot artillery regiments of the United States Army and remained in service until 1872 for use of foot artillerymen. It was the issue sword for sergeants and musicians of infantry regiments from 1832 until 1840. As most artillery regiments were trained and equipped as infantry prior to 1861 a single weapon for both types of troops made sense. It replaced the earlier Starr pattern sword used throughout the 1820s. While the design was impractical for actual combat, it is believed that artillerymen put this weapon to other uses, such as clearing brush or creating trails. It was an effective tool for cutting paths through the Florida swamps during the Second Seminole War, which occurred during the time it was issued to infantry sergeants, drummers and fifers. This is somewhat corroborated by the French nickname for their version of the sword, coupe choux (cabbage cutter). The last Ames contract for this sword was completed in 1862, although as a stock item it continued to be listed in company catalogs for decades afterwards.

The design was based on the French foot artillery short sword of 1816, which with minor changes was basically repeated in 1831. The French model was largely inspired by the Roman gladius, the standard sword of the Roman legionaries. The Texas M1840 artillery sword in turn based on 1832 Model.

== Distinguishing features ==
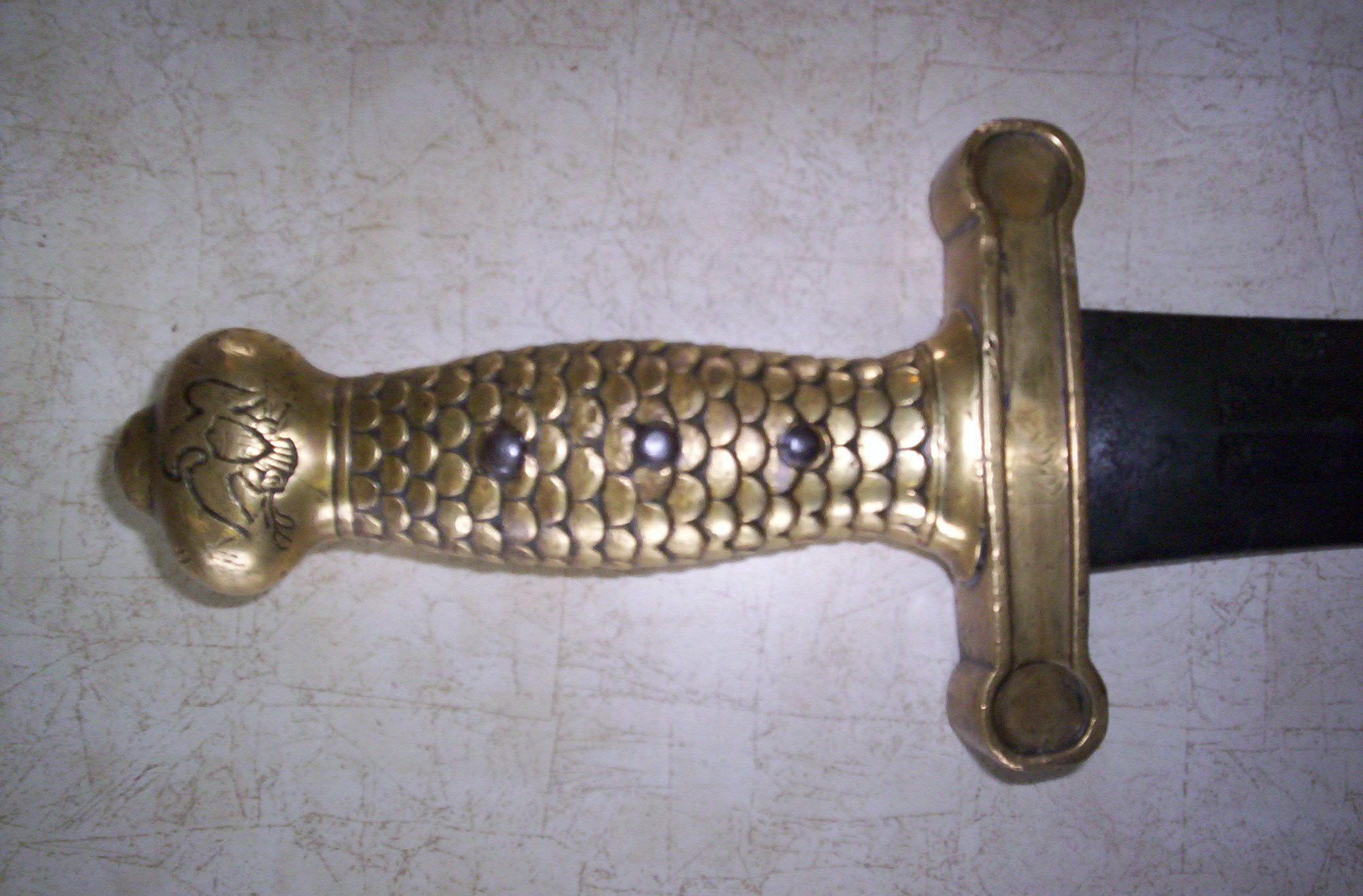
Close up of the hilt

French versions can be distinguished from American versions by the hilt design, manufacturers' marks (French manufacturers include Châtellerault, St. Etienne, Talabot, and Thiebaut), and the lack of U.S. markings. Swords supplied by Ames typically bore an eagle on the blade until the Mexican–American War, whereas those made during the American Civil War by Confederate arsenals were typically unmarked. The Ames Model 1832 has a hilt with an eagle cast into the pommel and a scaled grip surface. French versions have either textured grips (model 1816) or ringed grips (model 1831), and like later English models a plain or smooth pommel on the hilt.
