= Swiss arms and armour =

Military equipment of the Old Swiss Confederacy

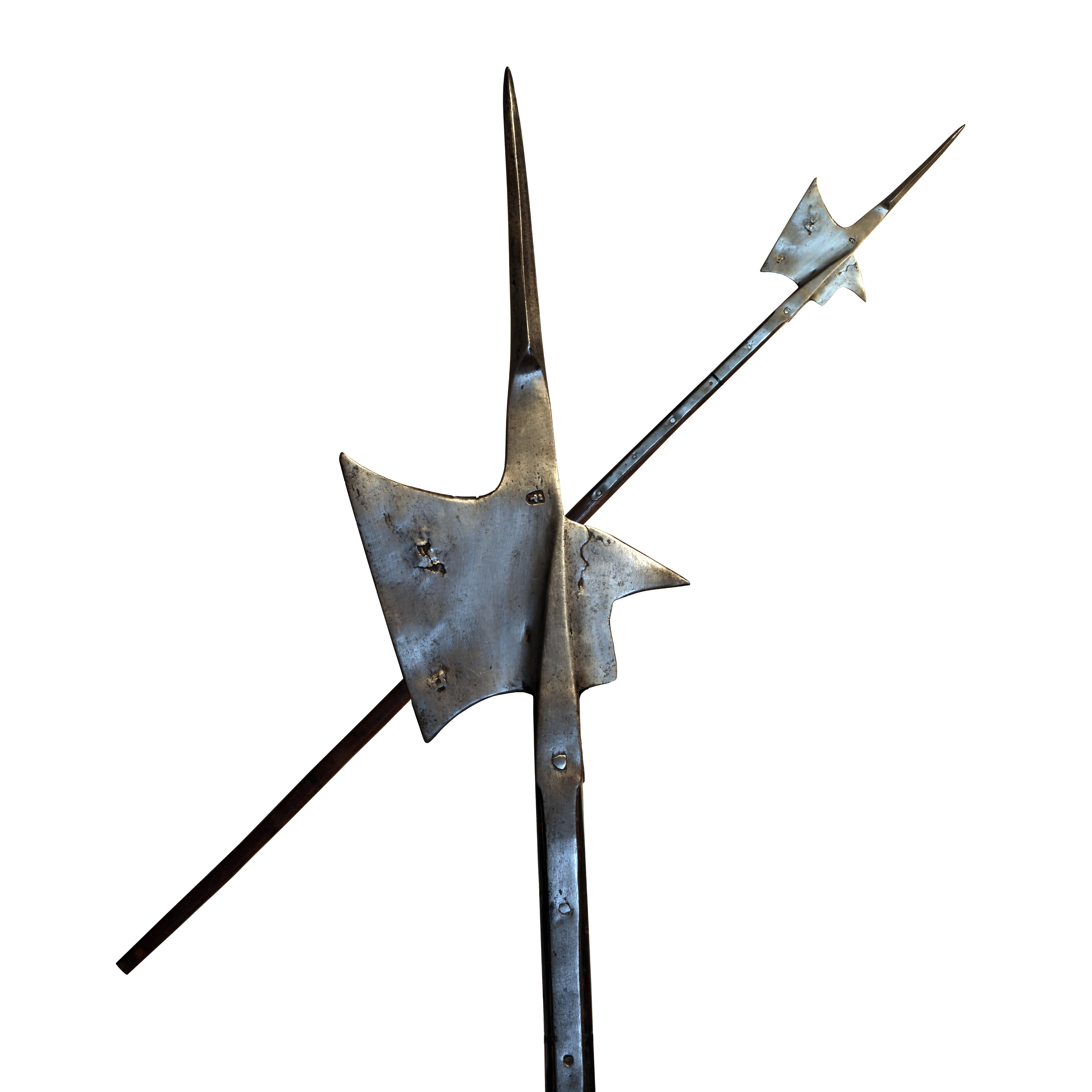
Swiss halberd (early 16th century)

The Swiss developed a number of characteristic weapons during their period of military activity in the 15th and early 16th centuries, perfected further during the Early Modern period (16th and 17th centuries).

The halberd was the primary weapon of the early Swiss armies in the 14th and early 15th centuries. Later on, the Swiss added the pike to better repel heavy cavalry and roll over enemy infantry formations, with the halberd, longsword, or the Swiss dagger used for closer combat. The German Landsknechte, who imitated Swiss warfare methods during the early 16th century, also used the pike, supplemented by the halberd. The halberd is still the ceremonial weapon of the Swiss Guard in the Vatican.

The Swiss armies of the late 14th and 15th centuries, used a variety of different polearms other than halberds and pikes, such as the Lucerne hammer. By the 15th century, the carrying of side arms (baselard, dagger, and degen) had become ubiquitous. Also common were the bow, the crossbow and later the arquebuse. The city cantons could also employ siege engines. Bern in the Burgdorferkrieg of 1383–84 used medieval types of catapults and battering rams, but for the first time also cannons and early handguns.

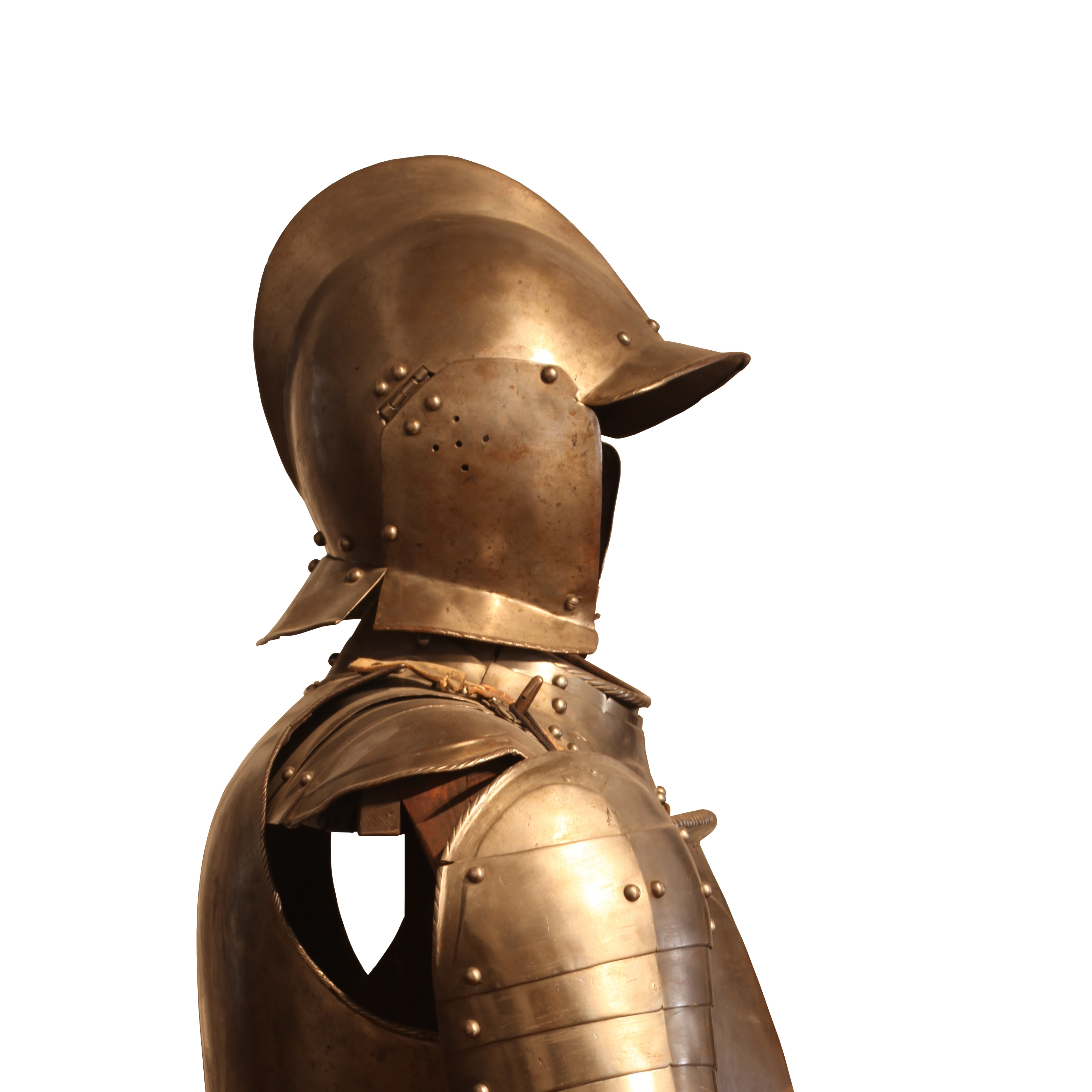
Typical footman's armour of the early 17th century

The bladesmiths of Basel, Bern and Zürich during the late 15th and the 16th centuries perfected their production of bladed weapons, developing the "national weapons" of the Swiss: the Swiss dagger, Swiss degen, and later also the Swiss sabre known as Schnepf. A feature of the Swiss armies of this period was the principle of self-equipment: each man was expected to purchase his own personal weapon, either pike, halberd or handgun, as well as his personal sidearm, and in the 18th century his own musket, bayonet, sabre, and uniform.

Central armouries (Zeughäuser) which were able to equip the troops of a given city developed only in the more wealthy cities during the 17th and 18th centuries, specifically in Zürich, Bern, Lucerne, Fribourg and Geneva. These did not supersede the principle of the privately owned equipment; instead, the armouries offered standard equipment at a reduced price to the individual serviceman. Consequently, substantial reserves of arms and armour were accumulated in the armouries of the Swiss cities during the Thirty Years' War, especially by Zürich and Solothurn. These armouries were decommissioned after the dissolution of cantonal military forces with the formation of the modern state in 1848.

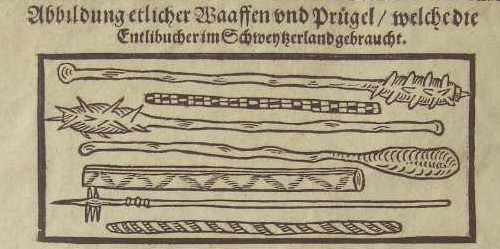
Depiction of the clubs carried by the peasants in the 1653 uprising

By contrast, the population of the rural cantons in the conflicts of the Early Modern period was often armed with simple and ad hoc weaponry, especially clubs, and maces such as the spiked morning star. This was the case in the Swiss peasant war of 1653, and again in the Stecklikrieg uprising of 1802, called after the eponymous Stäckli "club" carried by the insurgents.

Substantial collections of historical arms and armour are kept in the Swiss National Museum in Zürich, in the Historical Museum in Bern and in the Morges Castle Military Museum.

== See also ==
- Swiss sword
- Military history of Switzerland
- Battles of the Old Swiss Confederacy
- Swiss mercenaries
- Almain rivet
- Schützenfest
