= Heinrich Wittenwiler =

Heinrich Wittenwiler (c. 1370–1420) was a late medieval Alemannic poet. He is the author of a satirical poem entitled The Ring (ca. 1410). He may be identical to an advocate to the bishop of Konstanz, mentioned in 1395. He may be of the family of the former rulers of Wittenwil in the Thurgau, who became destitute and abandoned their castle in 1339. Throughout the early 15th century, most bearers of the name lived in the Toggenburg, probably including one of the scribes of the Cgm 558.

The Ring is a poem of 9699 lines, preserved in a single manuscript, apparently an autograph of Wittenwiler's. Each line is marked with either red or green ink. In the prologue (verse 40f.) Wittenwiler explains that the red line marks "serious" material, while the green marks törpelleben (literally "village life", in the sense of "rusticity, peasantry, buffoonery"), but the actual division between "red" and "green" material is far from straightforward. The protagonists are Bertschi Triefnas and Mätzli Rüerenzumph, two peasant lovers from Lappenhausen, a fictitious village in the Black Forest. The handsome Bertschi woos the ugly Mätzli with knightly pretensions. The wedding involves a "peasant tournament" and escalates into wild brawling, leading to a war between villages and the destruction of Lappenhausen.

== Editions ==
- Edmund Wießner, Leipzig 1931
- Bernhard Sowinski, Heinrich Wittenwiler, Der Ring. Text mit neuhochdeutscher Übersetzung und Kommentar, Stuttgart 1988.
- Bibliotheca Augustana, online edition
