= Swiss sabre =

Type of sword (16th cent.)

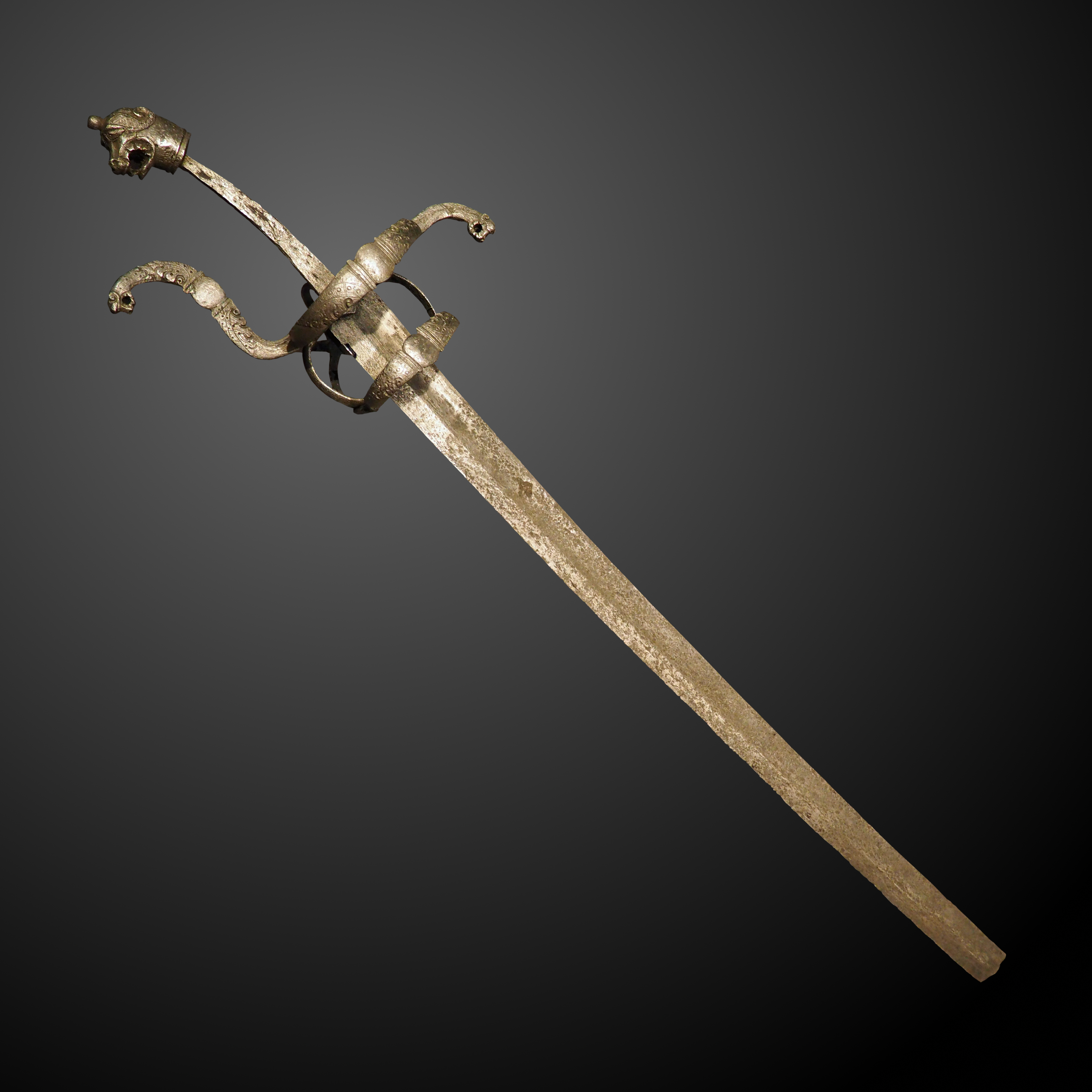
- A Swiss Sabre from the 1500s.
- Type: Sabre
- Place of origin: Switzerland

The Swiss sabre (German: Schweizersäbel) is a type of two-handed sabre design that was popular in Early Modern Switzerland.

== Etymology ==
Unlike the terms Swiss degen (German: Schweizerdegen) and Swiss dagger (German: Schweizerdolch) which are attested in the 16th century, Schweizersäbel is a modern term.

It was coined by antiquarian and curator of the Swiss National Museum Eduard Achilles Gessler (1880–1947) in his 1914 publication on the topic.

The contemporary term for this weapon was "snipe" (German: Schnepf or German: Schnäpf), apparently based on likening the blade to the beak of this kind of bird.

== Design ==
Swiss sabres have single-edged, slightly curved blades which in the mid-16th century were set in regular sword hilts, including the variety of designs found there, with recurved quillions and/or rings and knuckle guards.

By the late 16th century, specialized hilt forms begin to emerge, often with pommels shaped as a lion's head, or plated with silver.

== See also ==
- Swiss arms and armour
