= Almain rivet =

Type of plate armour

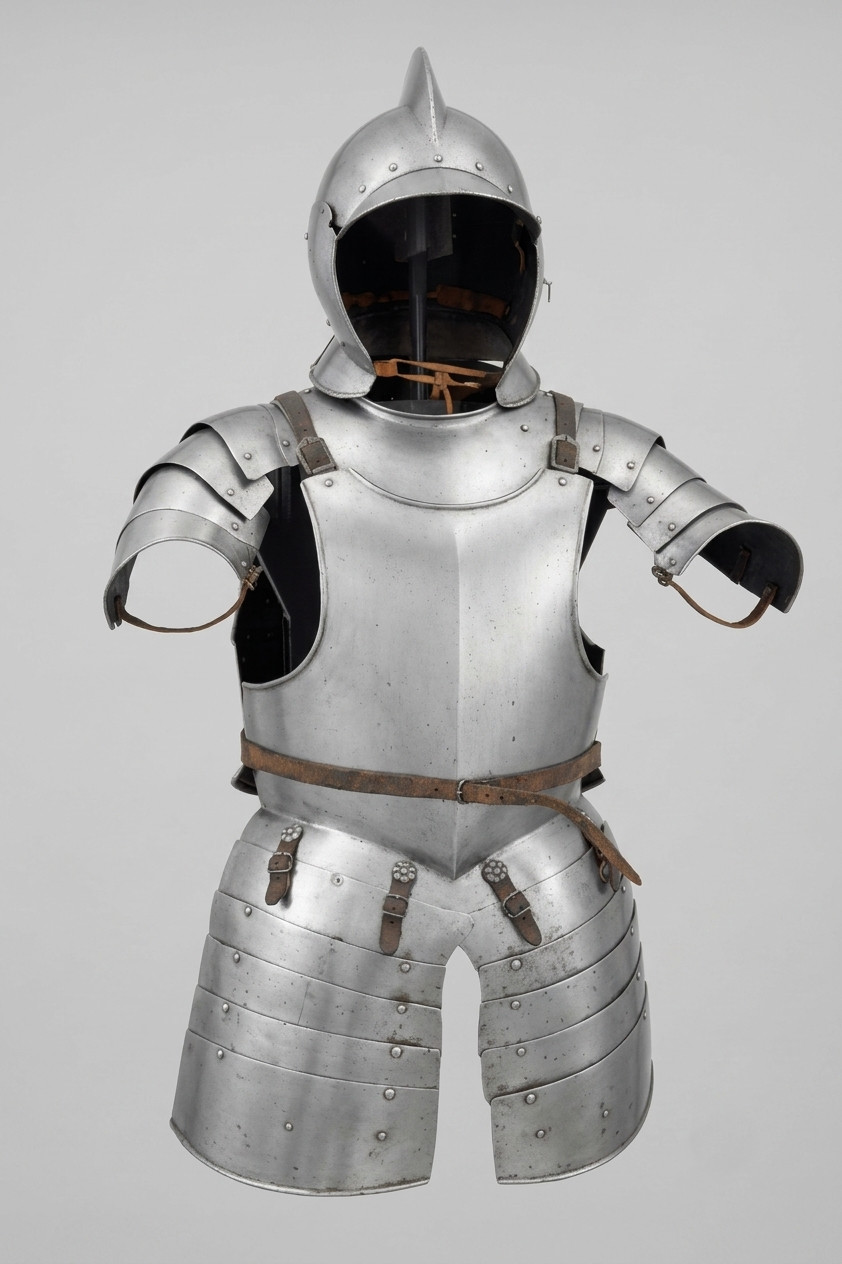
Almain rivet half-armour, typically worn by Swiss or landsknechts in the 16th century. The tassets consist of five plates each, connected by sliding rivets.

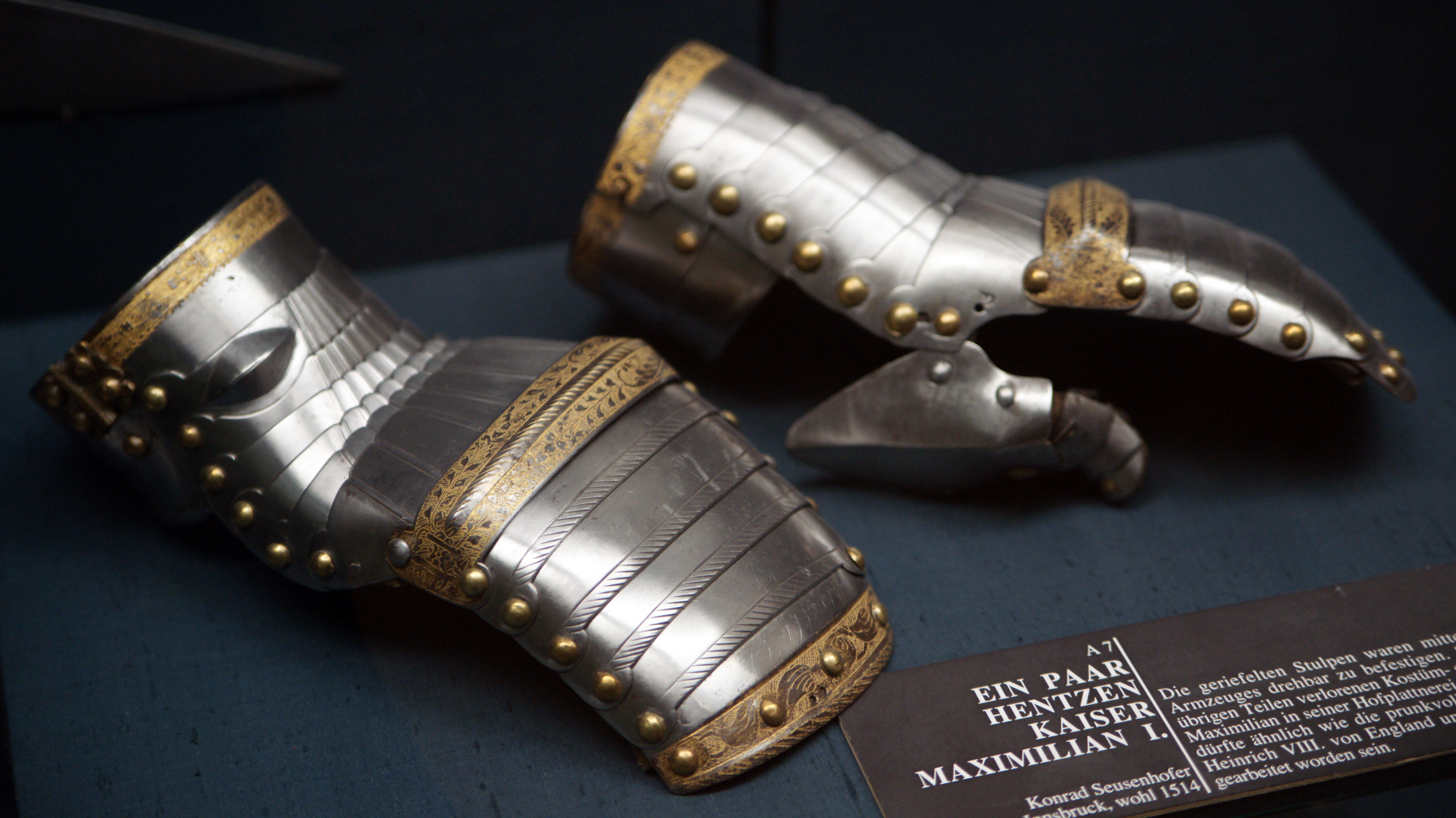
Almain rivet gauntlets of Emperor Maximilian I, c.1514. Museum of Fine Arts (Kunsthistorisches Museum), Vienna

An Almain rivet is a type of flexible plate armour created in Germany in about 1500. It was designed to be manufactured easily whilst still affording considerable protection to the wearer. It consisted of a breastplate and backplate with laminated thigh-guards called tassets. Almain rivets were generally of fairly low quality, but they were cheap: a royal proclamation issued by Henry VIII in 1542 designated them at 7s 6d, which equated to one sixth of the cost of a suit of demi-lance armor. Almain rivets were frequently purchased en masse as munitions-grade armour to equip royal armies or personal retinues.

== Nomenclature ==
The term rivet derives from the "overlapping plates sliding on rivets" characteristic of this type of armour. Almain is an Early Modern English term for "German" (still used in some poetic and/or archaic senses), from the French alemanique, from the mediaeval Latin alemanicus, from Alemanni, an early Germanic tribe. The term was introduced in about 1530 and remained in use until about 1600. Based on the term almain-rivet, the word rivet itself acquired a meaning of "armour", attested (rarely) during the mid-16th century.

== See also ==
- Greenwich armour
- Swiss arms and armour
