= Swiss dagger =

Dagger used by Swiss mercenaries, 16th century

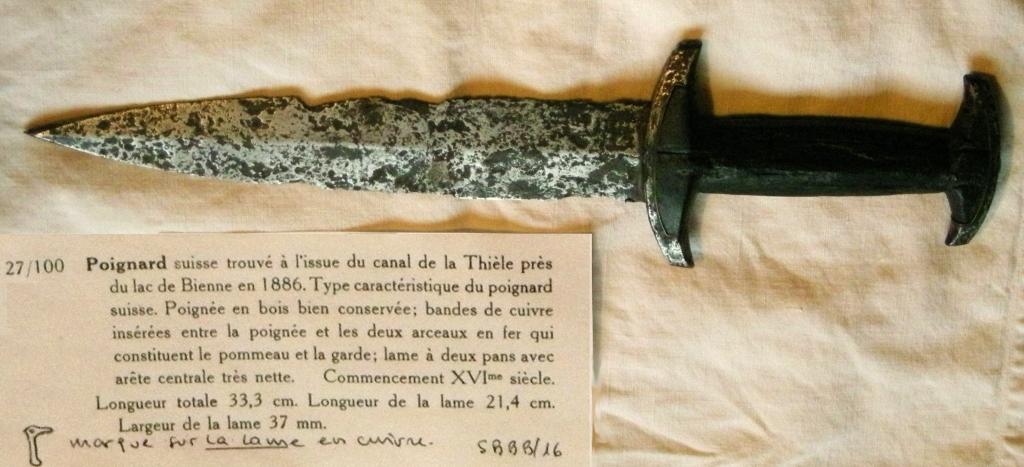
Swiss dagger, early 16th century, found in the Thielle river.

The Swiss dagger (Schweizerdolch) is a distinctive type of dagger used in Switzerland and by Swiss mercenaries during the 16th century. It develops from similar dagger types known as basler which were in use during the 14th and 15th centuries. The characteristic mark of the Swiss dagger are two crescent-shaped, inward-bent metal bars delimiting the hilt.

The curved shape of the Swiss dagger hilt appeared as early as the 13th century and remained peculiar to Switzerland, and does not appear to have been imitated elsewhere. The blade was characteristically double edged, tapering to a point and usually had a diamond shape cross-section.

One of the masterpieces of Hans Holbein the Younger is a 1521 design for a dance of death on the sheath of such a dagger (which was implemented on a number of surviving examples). The dagger was often worn horizontally on the hip, thus the ornaments on the scabbard were often also crafted horizontally. After 1550, the Swiss dagger became a prestigious ornamental weapon, with hilt and sheath decorated with precious metal and scenes from the Bible, classical antiquity or Swiss history. Daggers of this period are also referred to as "Holbein" daggers. Schneider (1977) dates the bulk of the extant specimens of this ornamented type to the 1560s to 1570s. The Swiss dagger disappears with the beginning of the Baroque period in the early 17th century. Schneider compiled a full index of all known originals and copies (including a considerable number of 19th-century imitations), for a total of 156 specimens. Many copies of originals were made in the period of national Romanticism (19th century), using a casting method. Schneider was able to distinguish copies from originals due to a slight shrinking due to the casting process. His conclusion was that slightly less than half of the extant "Holbein" daggers are originals.

The ordnance dagger issued to officers in the Swiss Armed Forces beginning in 1943 was modeled after the historical Swiss dagger. In Nazi Germany, the hilts of some political and military daggers (worn by members of SS, SA, and NSKK formations) were also modeled on the Swiss dagger. In the Swiss army, the dagger was removed from the officers' dress uniform in 1995.

Examples of Swiss daggers
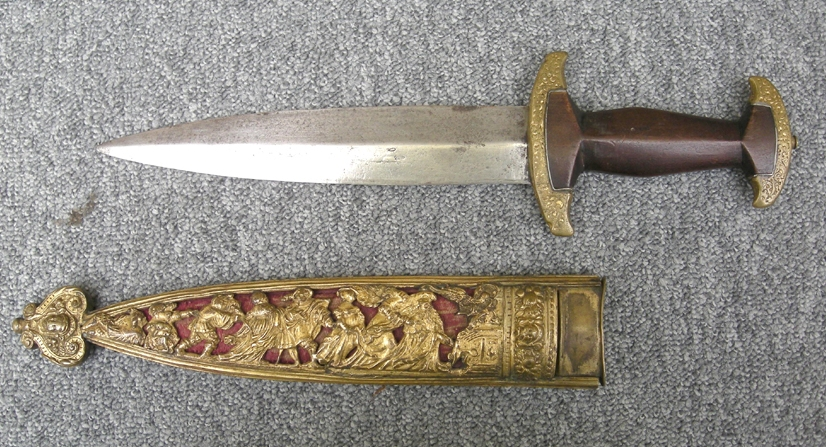
Swiss dagger of the "Holbein" type in the style of c. 1570.

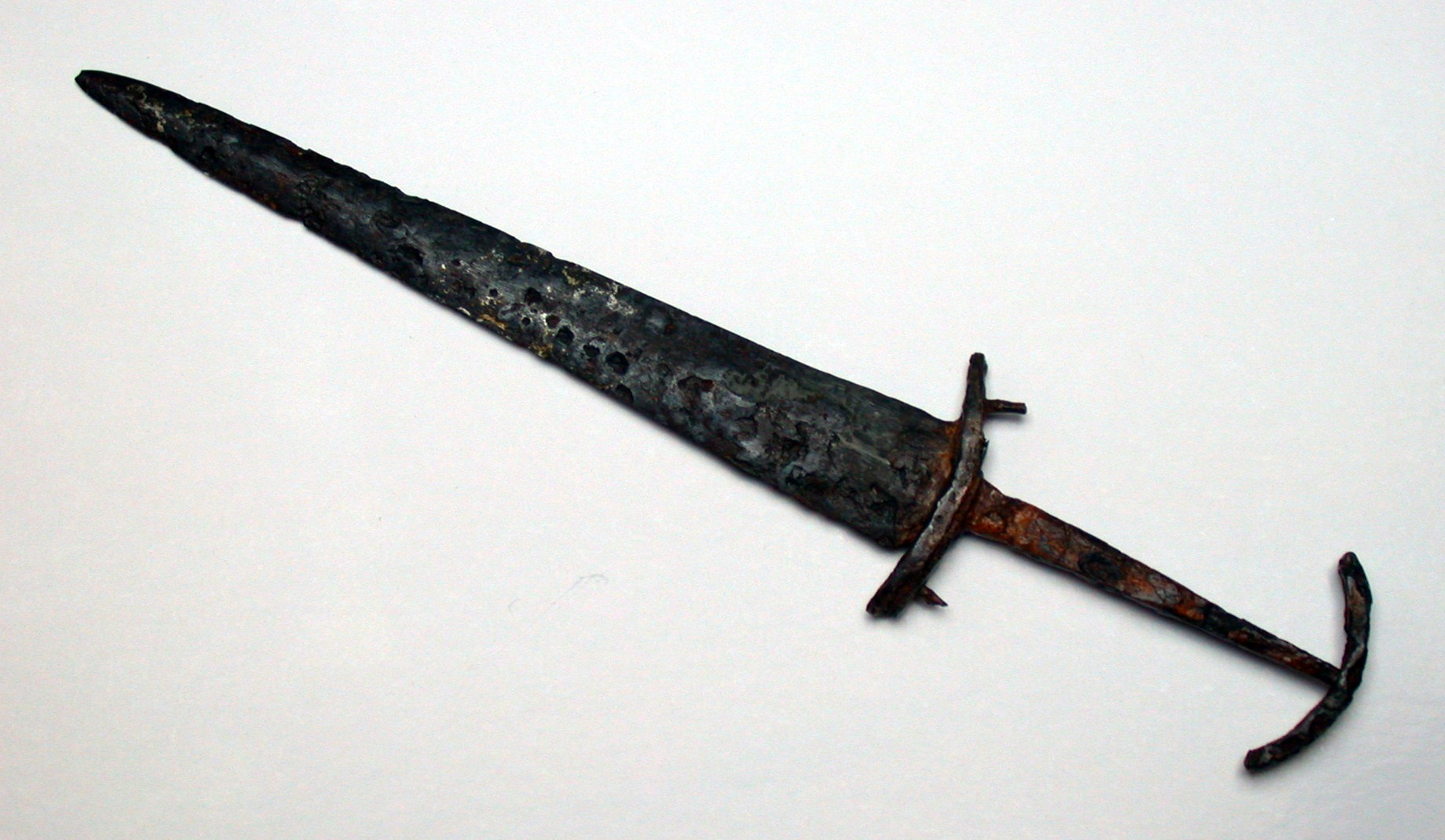
A basler from 14th-century Switzerland, showing the characteristic curved guard-pieces of the later Swiss dagger, but the curvature of the two pieces is parallel, while the classical Swiss dagger has opposite curvature as it were "enveloping" the hand.

The 1914 ordnance dagger of the officers of the Swiss army

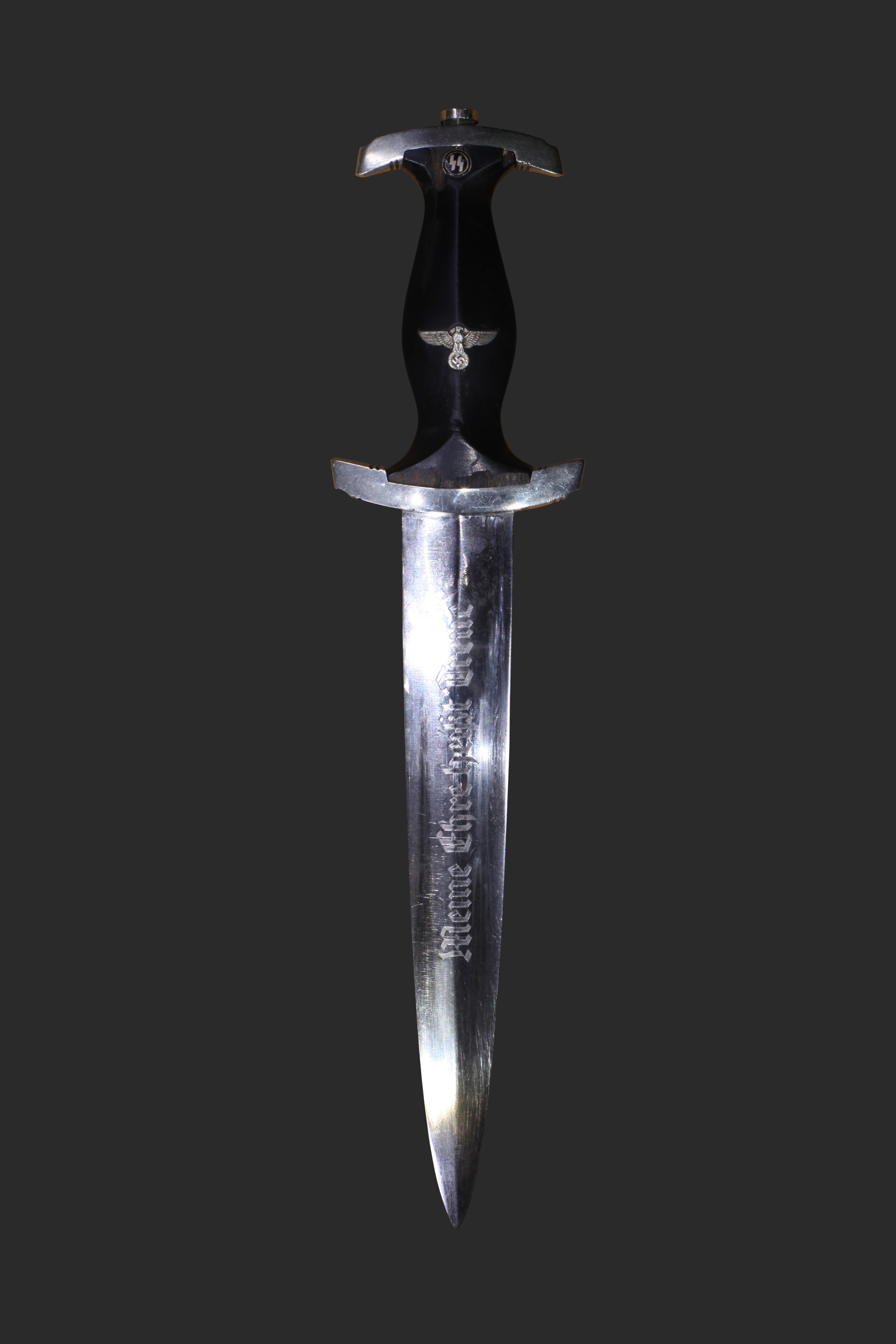
The SS-Ehrendolch, ordnance dagger of the SS, with Meine Ehre heißt Treue inscription acid etched on the blade.

== See also ==
- List of daggers
- Swiss arms and armour
- Baselard
- Medieval dagger
- Swiss degen
