= Model 1816 French artillery short sword =

Sidearm used by the French army

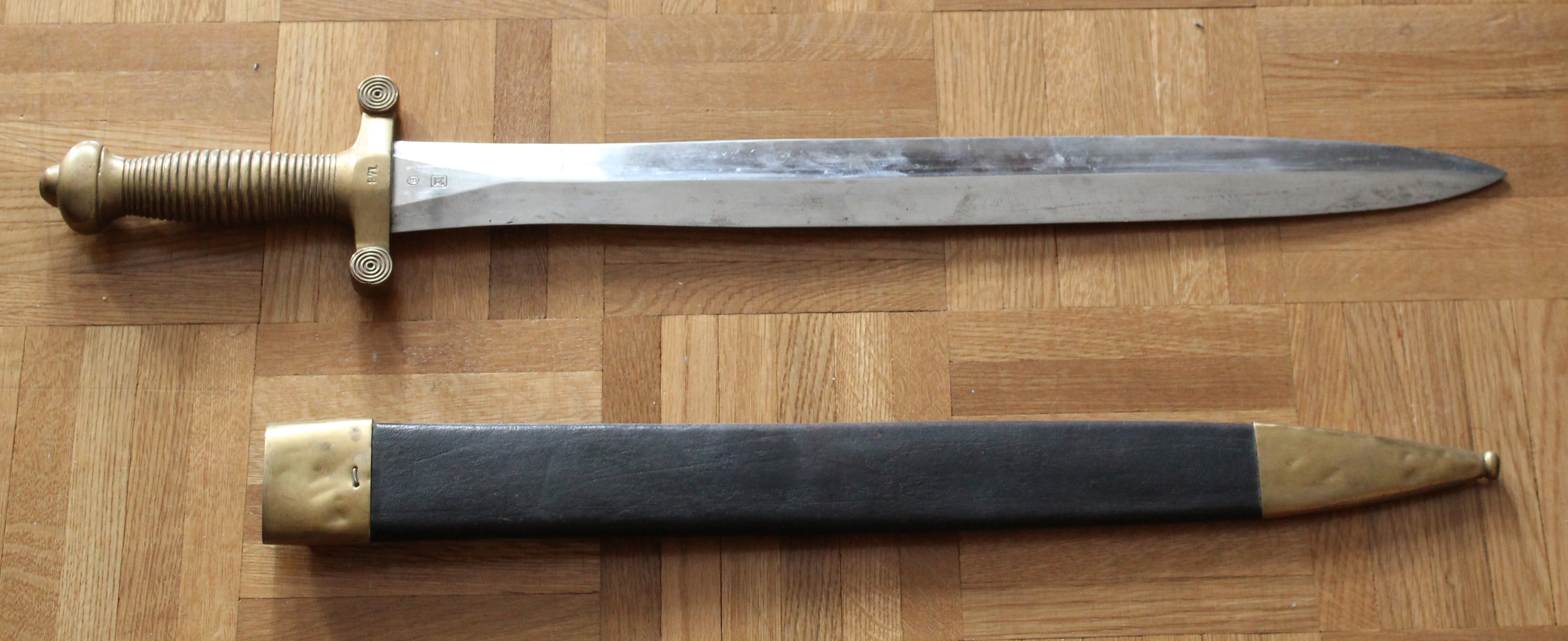
The 1831 model

The 1816 artillery short sword was a sidearm issued to the French foot artillery. Heavily influenced by the prevailing Neoclassical style of the day, the sword was based on ancient sculptural depictions of the Roman gladius, the standard sword of the Roman legionaries. The short sword would not have been a practical weapon for combat without a shield, but served as a fascine knife or a machete to clear fields for the guns. It also served for other practical uses, the French soldiers calling it a coupe-chou ("cabbage cutter"). It was in service until about 1870.

The model was reissued in 1831 with minor changes. Most visibly, the newer model had a ringed grip rather than the fishscale pattern seen in the earlier model. It also provided the inspiration for the American Model 1832 Foot Artillery Sword, though the American model retained the fishscale grip of the 1816 model.
