= Munition armour =

Mass-produced late medieval body armour

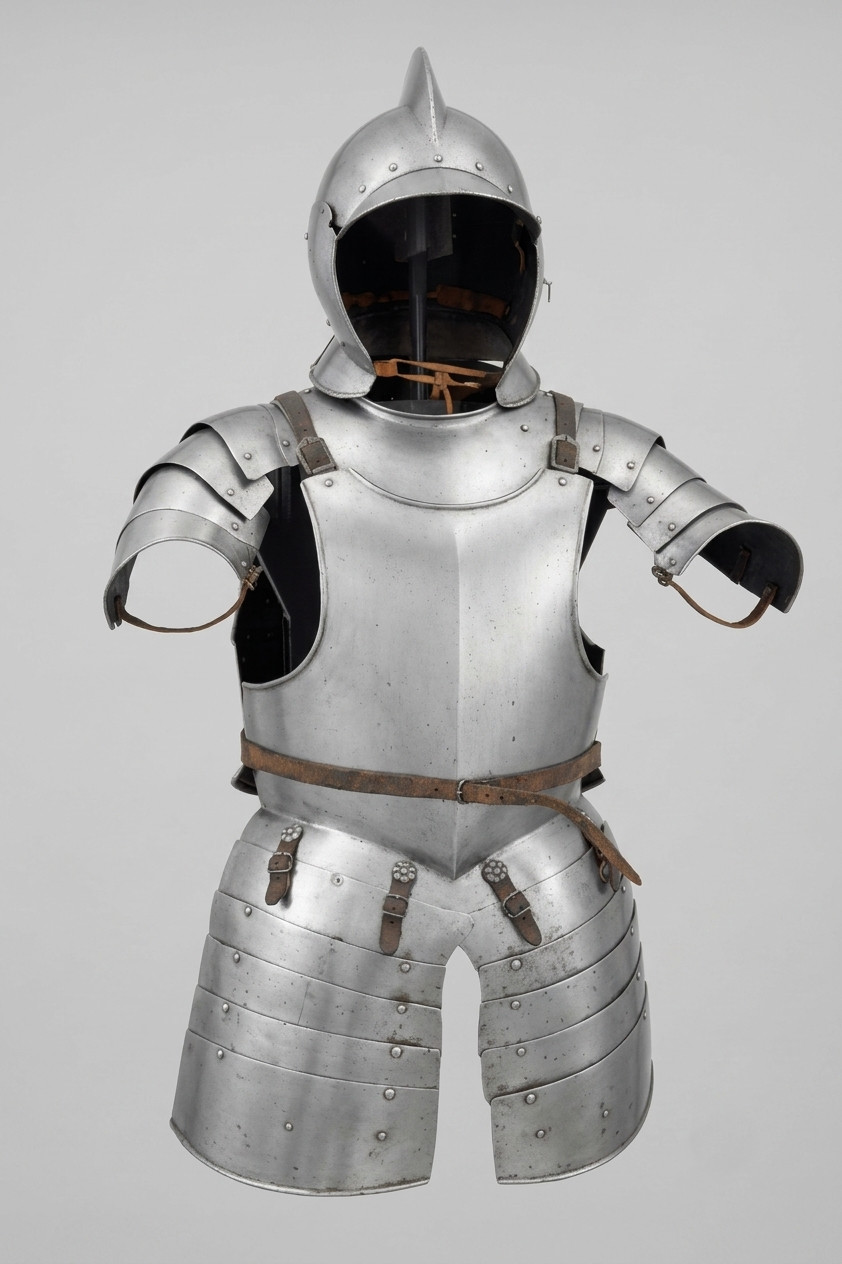
Typical Swiss or Landsknechts half-armour worn by foot soldiers in the 16th century, known in England as almain rivet.

Munition armour (also "munitions-grade armour", "munition quality armour") was mass-produced armour stockpiled in armouries to equip both foot soldiers and mounted cuirassiers.

== History ==
During the Late Middle Ages, plate armour was expensive and tailor-made for the wearer. Consequently, it was generally reserved for nobility and their retainers. During the English Civil War, a cuirassier's armour could weigh between 32 and 45 kilograms (71 and 99 lb), making this form of armour prohibitively costly and heavy. For these reasons, full plate armour started to disappear during the first few years of the conflict.

Early Modern warfare was characterized by the establishment of standing armies equipped with mass-produced ordnance weapons. Munitions-grade armour was produced in both Europe and Japan beginning in the 15th century to equip the standing armies developed from this period.

Munition armour was of a standard pattern with interchangeable pieces. It was often made of iron or sometimes an alloy of iron containing a small amount of phosphorus, which gave a marginal increase in hardness. The phosphorus content may have been due to the use of high-phosphorus ores or the use of coal in smithing.

In Japan, the warfare of the Sengoku period (15th and 16th centuries) required large quantities of armour to be produced for the ever growing armies of foot soldiers (ashigaru). Simple munition quality (okashi or lent) cuirasses (dō) and helmets (kabuto) were mass-produced including foldable suits, like tatami armour.Tatami armour was made from small iron or leather plates that were usually connected to each other by mail.

== See also ==
- Almain rivet
- Swiss arms and armour

== Bibliography ==
- Woosnam-Savage, Robert C.; Anthony Hall (2002). Brassey's Book of Body Armor. Potomac Books, Incorporated. ISBN 1-57488-465-4.
