= Cgm 558 =

Convolution of two 15th-century manuscripts

The Cgm 558, or Codex germanicus monacensis, is a convolution of two 15th-century manuscripts with a total of 176 folia, bound together in the 16th century. It is kept at the Bavarian library in Munich. The first manuscript contains two chronicles composed by one Otmar Gassow in 1462, one concerned with Zürich, the other with the Toggenburg (see Old Zürich War), and a copy of the 13th century Schwabenspiegel law codex.

== Contents ==
- first part, by Otmar Gossow 1462, foll. 1–100.
  - 1r–94v: Schwabenspiegel
  - 94v–100r Landfried König Rudolf, 1287 (biography of Rudolph I of Germany)
- second part, in two 15th-century hands, foll. 101–160.
  - scribe A, 101–124
    - 101r–109v Chronik von Zürich, Eberhard von Müllner (chronicle of Zürich)
    - 109v–113r Chronistische Notizen zur Schweizergeschichte, 1385–1446, appendix to the Zürich chronicle)
    - 113r–124r Kleine Toggenburger Chronik, 1314 (Petite Chronique de Toggenburg)
  - scribe B (Hugo Wittenwiler), 125–150
    - 125r–136v Fechtbuch (combat treatise)
    - 136r–141r Lehre von den Zeichen des Hirsches (on hunting the stag)
    - 141r–150r Beizbüchlein (hunting manual, incomplete)
  - scribe A, 151–160
    - 151r-153r Planetenverse (astrological verses)
    - 153r-160r Monatsregimen, mit verworfenen Tagen (calendars)

== The Fechtbuch ==
The second part contains a short Fechtbuch on 12 pages, penned in Hand B, attributed on fol. 141r to per manus Hugonis dicti Wittenwiller (cf. Heinrich Wittenwiler who may be of the same family), together with an illegible date. The text's language is High Alemannic, and it was probably written in or near the Toggenburg.

The treatise consists of 122 short paragraphs, numbered by de Grenier (2004), treating the long sword (1–50), pole weapons (halberd, spear 51–55), combat on horseback with sword or spear (56–64), the baselard (65–80), dagger on foot and on horseback (81–85), knife (86–90), unarmed defense against an attack with a baselard, a dagger or a knife (91–98) and grappling (99–122).

Paragraphs numbered 44 consists of three rhymed couplets, the last one reading

Iunk man lern maister ler / hab got lib und frowen er
"Young man, learn masters' lore, love God and honour noble women"

This is reminiscent of one of Johannes Liechtenauer's verses, cf.

Jung Ritter lere / got lip haben frawen io ere
"Young knight, learn to love god, and to honour noble women"

The long sword terminology seems also loosely influenced by the German school, but it has some terms that are not encountered elsewhere (gassen how, schlims how (two strikes), drig angel "triangle" (a stance or stepping action)).
