= Meine Ehre heißt Treue =

SS motto in Nazi Germany

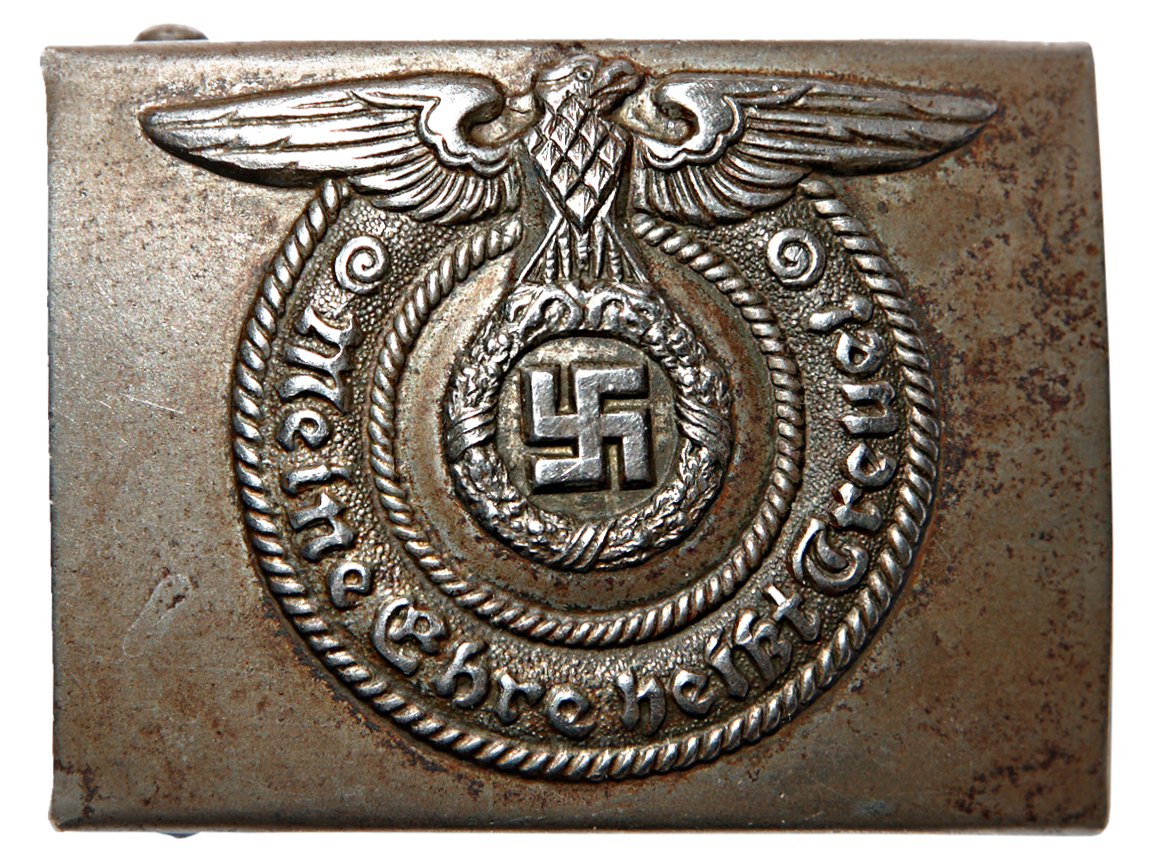
An SS belt buckle featuring the motto Meine Ehre heißt Treue

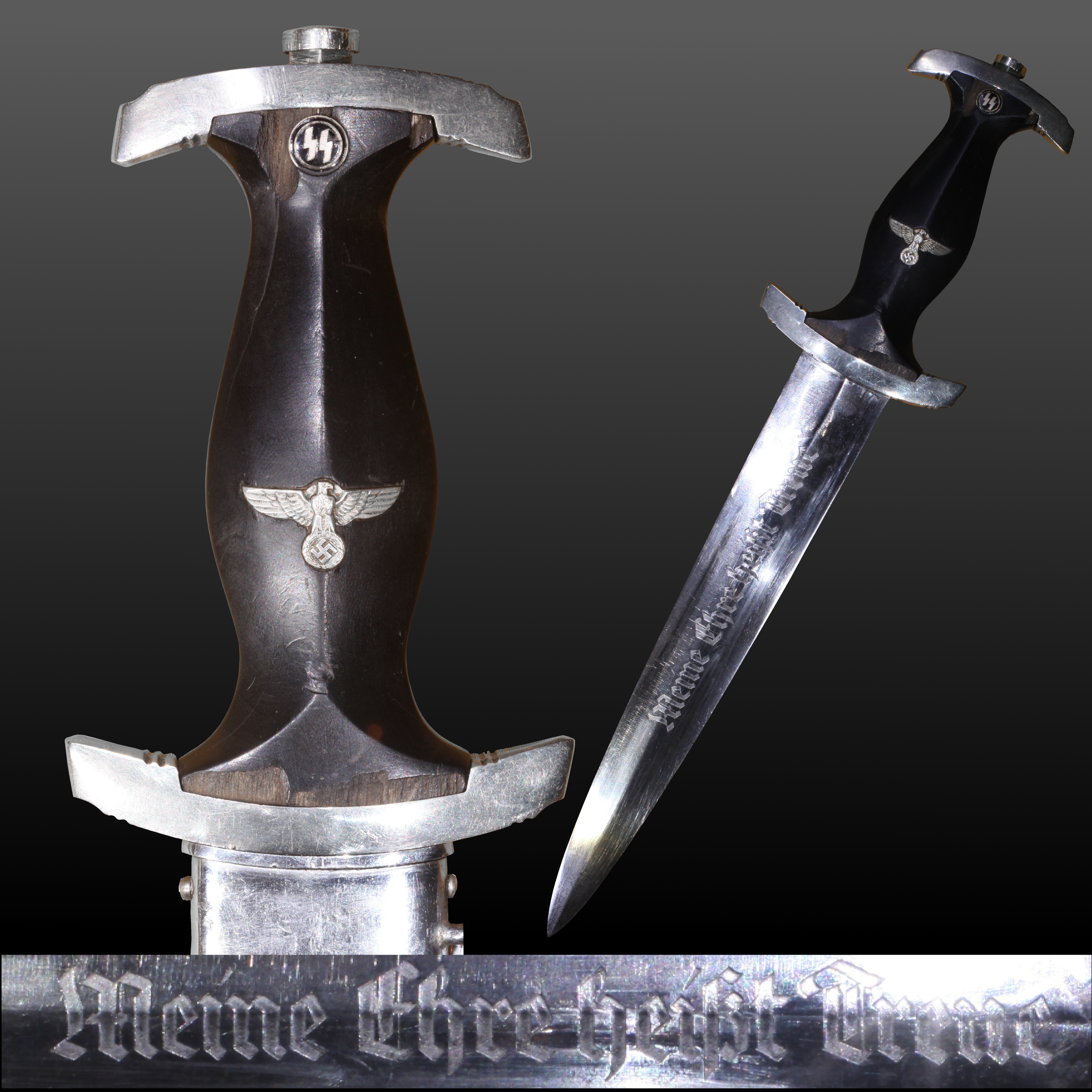
Ordnance dagger of the SS with Meine Ehre heißt Treue inscribed on the blade

Meine Ehre heißt Treue (pronounced [ˌmaɪnə ˈʔeːʁə haɪst ˈtʁɔʏə]; "My honor is loyalty") was the official motto of the Schutzstaffel (SS) from 1931 to 1945.

== Origin ==
In a National Socialist context, the phrase Meine Ehre heißt Treue refers to a declaration by Adolf Hitler following the Stennes Revolt, an incident between the Sturmabteilung (SA) and the Schutzstaffel (SS) in Berlin. In August 1930, elements of the SA under Walter Stennes stormed and ransacked the offices of the Berlin Gau of the National Socialist German Workers' Party, which prompted Joseph Goebbels, the Gauleiter of Berlin, to flee with his staff. A handful of SS men led by Kurt Daluege were beaten trying to unsuccessfully repel the SA. After the incident, Hitler wrote a letter of congratulation to Daluege and his men, stating "... SS-Mann, deine Ehre heißt Treue!" ("Man of the SS, your honor is loyalty"). Soon afterward, Reichsführer-SS Heinrich Himmler, adopted the modified version of this phrase as the motto of the organisation, inscribed on the SS belt buckle.

== Usage ==
Meine Ehre heißt Treue was frequently inscribed on SS objects, including honorary daggers and belt buckles of the Allgemeine SS. Many Germanic SS units (non-German SS units in German-occupied Europe) adopted a translation of the motto in their own languages, such as Mijn Eer Heet Trouw/Mijn Eer is mijn Trouw in Dutch, Min Ære er Troskap in Norwegian, and Troskab vor Ære in Danish.

== Laws ==
Since 1947, the use of this motto or variations of it are prohibited in Austria and Germany in their laws pertaining to the use of symbols of anti-constitutional organizations, e.g. in Germany, Strafgesetzbuch 86a. The sentence is used by some extreme-right organisations.

Jurica Živoder (29), a contestant on the Croatian RTL television show "Love is in the countryside", was removed from the show in April 2021 after viewers complained about his "Meine Ehre heißt Treue" tattoo. The producers in response gave a statement: "all his scenes will be cut before airing after discovering he also liked a Facebook page titled 'Adolf Hitler's political beliefs'".

== See also ==
- Gott mit uns
- Honneur et Fidélité
- Semper fidelis
- Blood and soil
