= Quintanas de Gormaz =

- Municipality
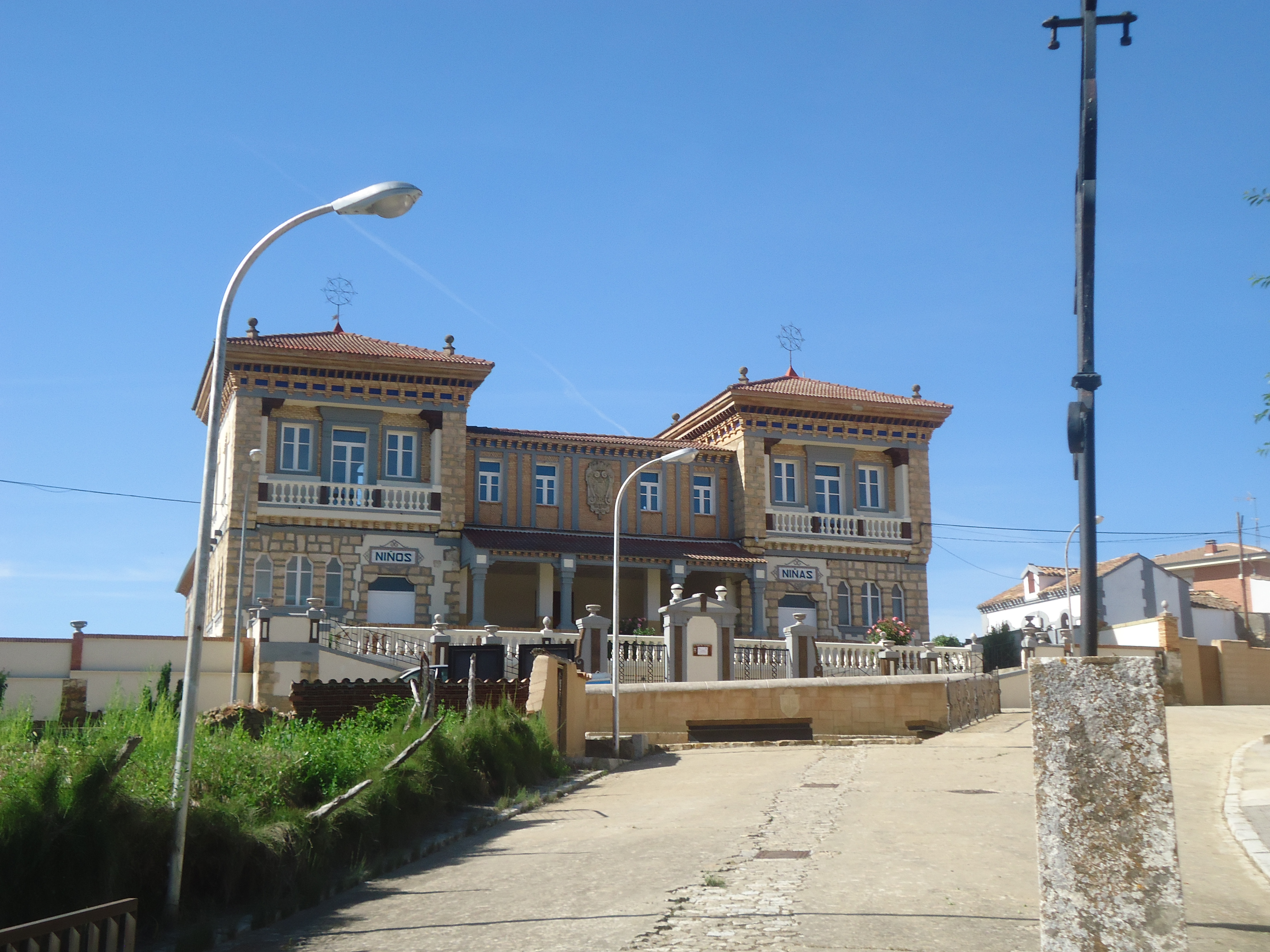

- Coat of arms

- Location in Spain. Quintanas de Gormaz (Spain)
- Coordinates: 41°30′29″N 2°58′33″W
- Country: Spain
- Autonomous community: Castile and León
- Province: Soria
- Municipality: Quintanas de Gormaz

Area
  - Total: 29.96 km^{2} (11.57 sq mi)
- Elevation: 937 m (3,074 ft)

Population (2025-01-01)
  - Total: 119
  - Density: 3.97/km^{2} (10.3/sq mi)
- Time zone: UTC+1 (CET)
  - Summer (DST): UTC+2 (CEST)
- Website: Official website

Quintanas de Gormaz is a municipality located in the province of Soria, Castile and León, Spain. According to the 2004 census (INE), the municipality has a population of 192 inhabitants.
