= Baselard =

Historical type of bladed weapon

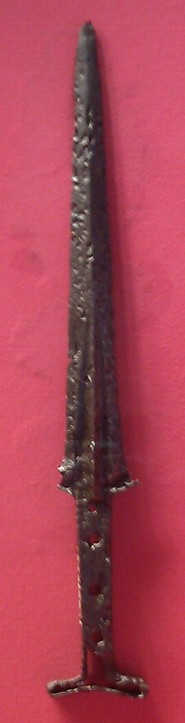
A 14th-century baselard (Swiss National Museum)

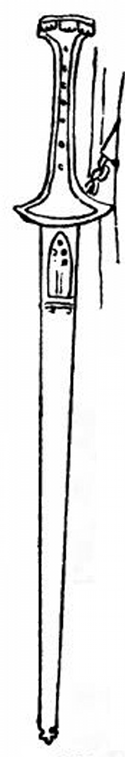
Drawing of the baselard shown on the effigy of Thomas de Topcliffe (died 1365) (Dillon 1887).

The baselard, Schwiizerdolch in Swiss-German (also basilard, baslard, in Middle French also badelare, bazelaire and variants, Latinized baselardus, basolardus etc., in Middle High German beseler, baseler, basler, pasler; baslermesser) is a historical type of dagger or short sword of the Late Middle Ages.

== Etymology ==
In modern use by antiquarians, the term baselard is mostly reserved for a type of 14th-century dagger with an I-shaped handle. It evolved out of the 13th-century knightly dagger, but was 'carried by everyone, and not exclusively a "knightly" weapon'. Contemporary usage was less specific, and the term in Middle French and Middle English could probably be applied to a wider class of large dagger. The term (in many spelling variants) first appears in the first half of the 14th century. There is evidence that the term baselard is in origin a Middle French or Medieval Latin corruption of the German basler [messer] "Basel knife".

Both the term baselard and the large dagger with H-shaped hilt or "baselard proper" appear by the mid-14th century. Several 14th-century attestations from France gloss the term as coutel "knife".

== Historical uses ==
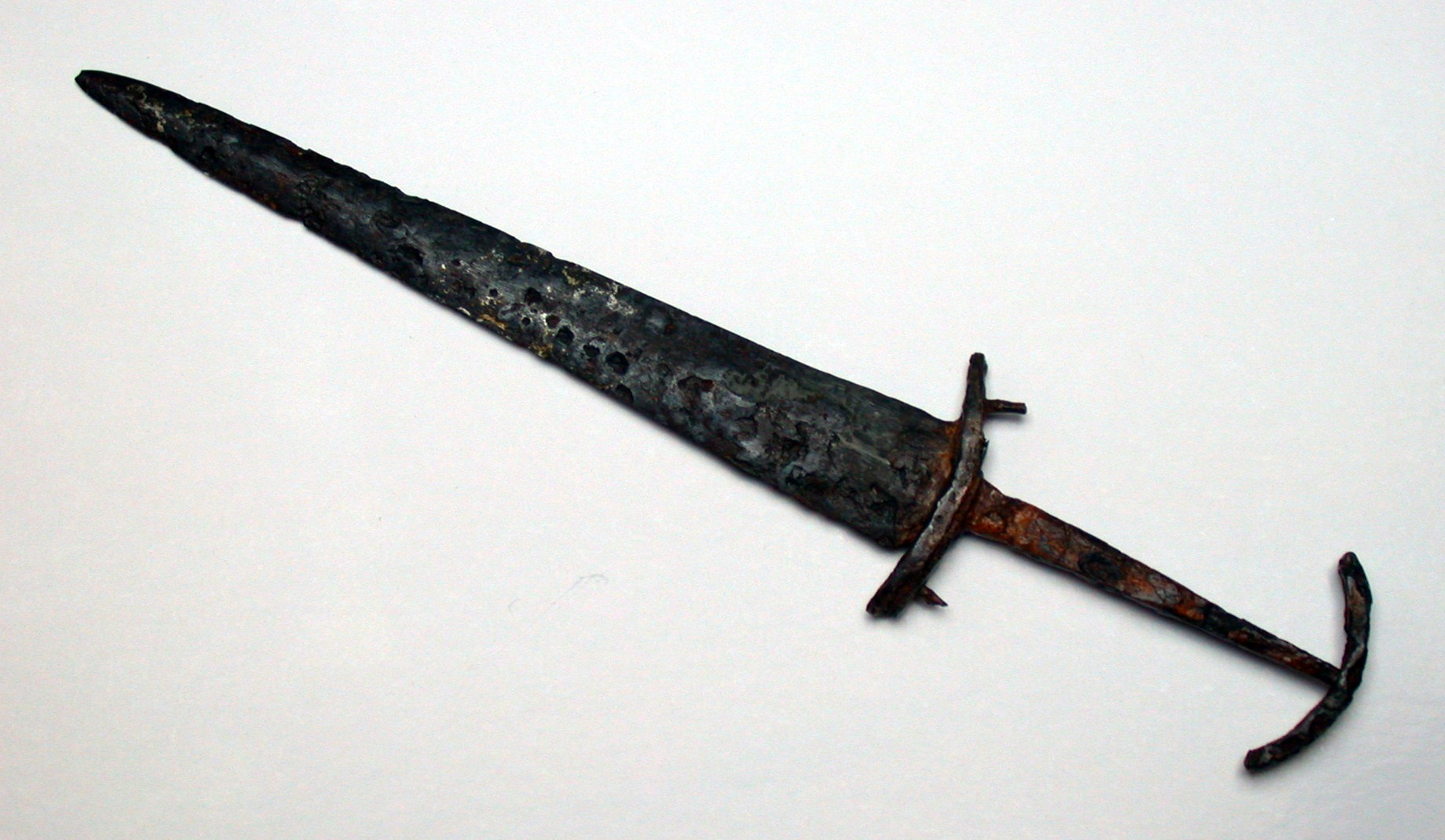
A 14th-century Swiss basler, predecessor of the classical Swiss dagger used in the 16th century.

Depictions of mid-14th-century examples are preserved as part of tomb effigies (figuring as part of the full military dress of the deceased knight). By the mid-14th century, the baselard is a popular sidearm carried by the more violence-prone section of civilian society, and it retains an association with hooliganism. One early attestation of the German form pasler (1341) is from a court document of Nuremberg recording a case against a man who had injured a woman by striking her on the head with this weapon. Several German law codes of the 14th to 15th centuries outlaw the carrying of a basler inside a city. By the late 14th century, it became fashionable in much of Western Europe, including France, Italy, Germany and England. Sloane MS 2593 (c. 1400) records a song satirizing the use of oversized baselard knives as fashion accessories. Piers Plowman also associates the weapon with vain gaudiness: in this case, two priests, "Sir John and Sir Geoffrey", are reported to have been sporting "a girdle of silver, a baselard or a ballok knyf with buttons overgilt."

Wat Tyler was slain with a baselard by the mayor of London, William Walworth, in 1381, and the original weapon was "still preserved with peculiar veneration by the Company of Fishmongers" in the 19th century.

In the Old Swiss Confederacy, the term basler seems to have referred to the 14th- to 15th-century weapons with the characteristic crescent-shaped pommel and crossguard, which occurred with widely variant blade length, and which by the early 16th century had split into the two discrete classes of the short Swiss dagger (Schweizerdolch) and the long Swiss degen (Schweizerdegen), indicating a semantic split between the formerly synonymous terms Dolch and Degen. The baselard was the nation's favoured sidearm, accompanying the halberd as a complementary second weapon that could be used effectively in the press of polearm combat. However, the baselard proper fell out of use by the early 16th century.

The term baselard and its variations persist for some time, but lose their connection with a specific type of knife. French baudelaire could now refer to a curved, single-edged hewing knife. Basilarda is the name of a sword in Orlando Furioso.

Also in English, the term could now refer to a Turkish weapon like the yatağan.

A very late occurrence of the term is found in 1602, in the context of a duel fought in Scotland, in Canonbie. The document recording the agreement on the weapons used in the duel mentions "two baslaerd swords with blades a yard and half quarter long".

After this, use of the term is restricted to antiquarian contexts.

== See also ==
- Swiss arms and armour
- List of daggers
- Medieval dagger

== Bibliography ==
- Lionello G. Boccia, Armi d'attaco, da difesa e da fuoco, la collezione d'armi del Museo d'Arte Medievale e Moderna di Modena, Modena 1996, nr. 80.
- Harold Dillon, ‘On some of the Smaller Weapons of the Middle Ages,’ The reliquary and illustrated archæologist (1887). https://archive.org/details/reliquaryandill01unkngoog
- Jürg A. Meier, Sammlung Carl Beck, Sursee (1998). http://www.waffensammlung-beck.ch/waffe197.html
- Michael 'Tinker' Pearce, The Medieval Sword in the Modern World (2007), ISBN 978-1-4303-2801-8, pp. 34, 65f.
