= Sidearm (weapon) =

Handgun, knife, or other weapon worn on the body in a holster or sheath

A sidearm is an individual-served weapon that is kept at one's side and can be rapidly accessed if needed. A sidearm may be carried alone or as an ancillary weapon to a more frequently-used primary weapon. The term historically referred to swords, daggers, and similar small weapons kept at one's side in a sheath, and in modern combat dominated by guns, sidearms are often defined as handguns that are similarly kept in a holster.

A sidearm is typically required equipment for military officers and may be carried by law enforcement personnel. Usually, uniformed personnel of these services wear their weapons openly, while plainclothes personnel have their sidearms concealed under their clothes.

== Uses ==
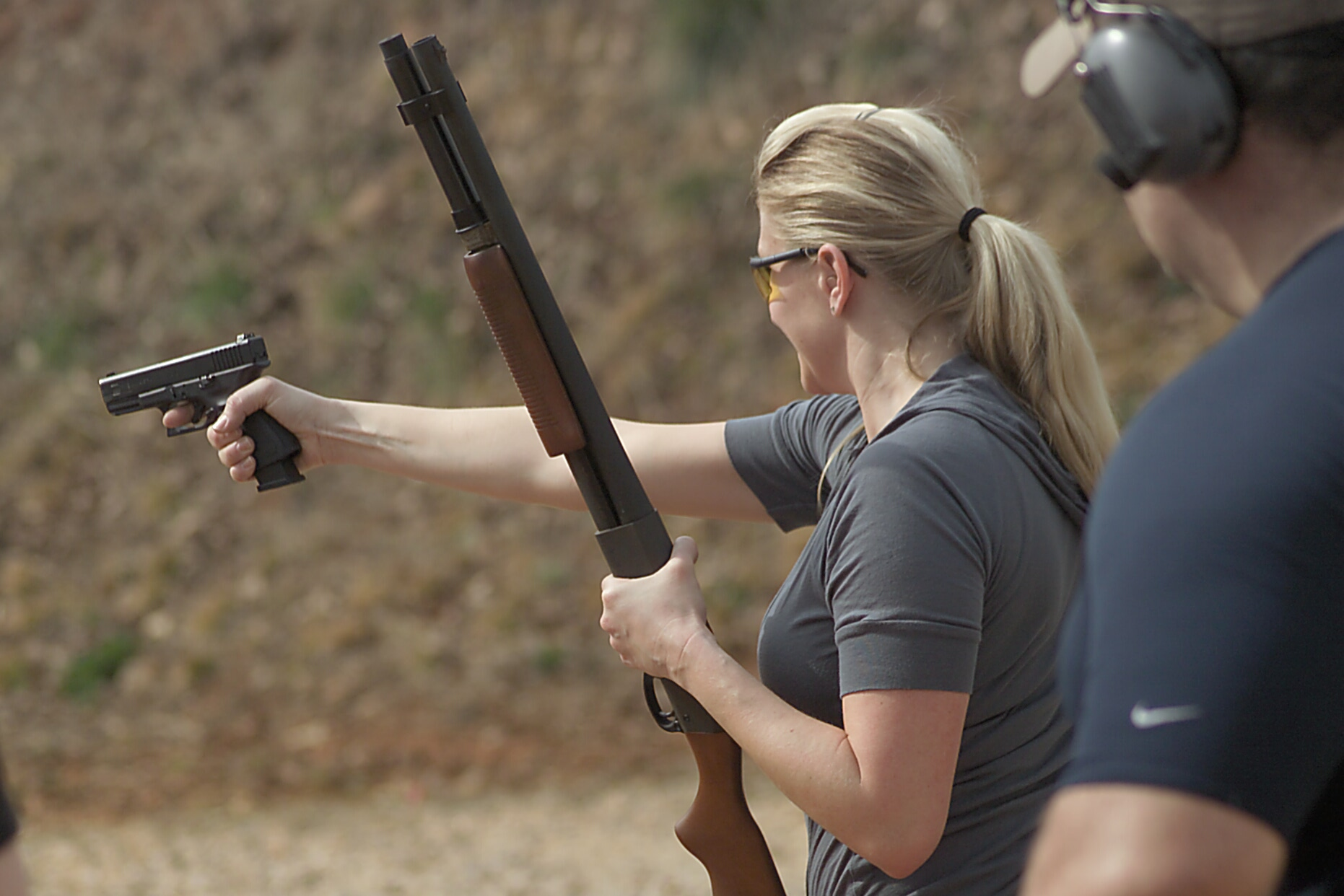
A shooter, armed with a Remington Model 870 shotgun as her primary weapon and firing a Glock pistol as her sidearm

In many contemporary armies, the issue of a sidearm in the form of a service pistol is a clear sign of authority and is the mark of a commissioned officer or senior non-commissioned officer. In the protocol of courtesy, the surrender of a commander's sidearm is the final act in the general surrender of a unit. If no ill will is meant, and a strict interpretation of military courtesy is applied, a surrendering commander may be allowed to keep their sidearm in order to exercise their right of command over their men.

An important purpose of the sidearm is to be used if the primary weapon is not available (damaged or lost), if it has run out of ammunition, or if it malfunctions. Many soldiers armed with a long gun such as a rifle or submachine gun may also have a semi-automatic pistol/machine pistol as a sidearm. Personal defense weapons are often issued as personal sidearms to combat personnel who operate in cramped spaces in which a rifle or carbine would be impractical, such as truck drivers, helicopter pilots, and vehicle crews.

== See also ==
- Short-barrelled shotgun
- List of pistols
- List of submachine guns
- Glossary of firearms terms
