= Buff (colour) =

Yellow-brown colour

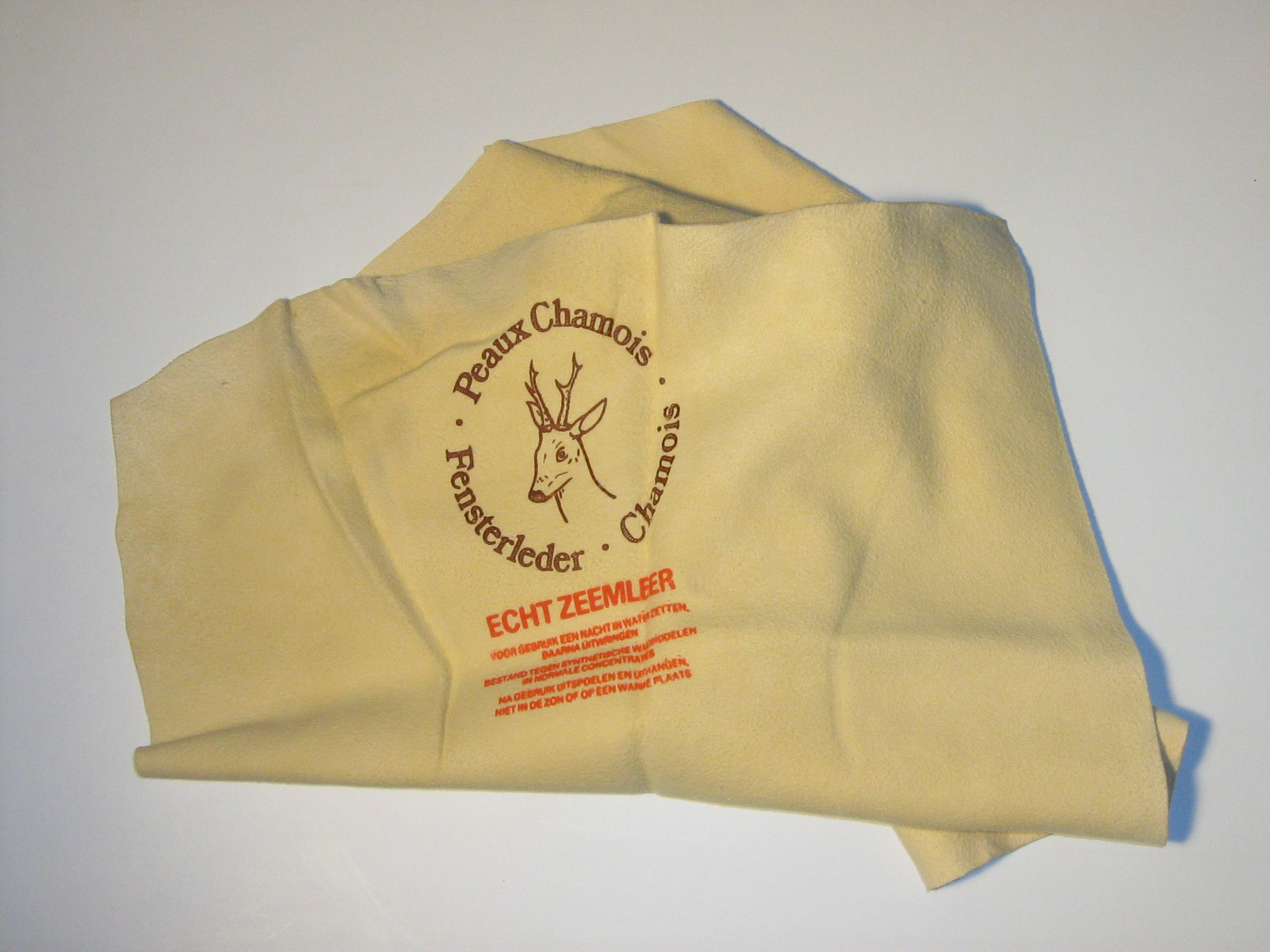

Colour coordinates
- Hex triplet: #E0AB76
- sRGB^{B} (r, g, b): (224, 171, 118)
- HSV (h, s, v): (30°, 47%, 88%)
- CIELCh_{uv} (L, C, h): (74, 58, 47°)
- Source: Maerz and Paul
- ISCC–NBS descriptor: Moderate orange yellow
- B: Normalized to [0–255] (byte)

Buff as an RYB quaternary colour
citron
buff
russet

Buff (Latin: bubalinus) is a light brownish yellow, ochreous colour, typical of buff leather. Buff is a mixture of yellow ochre and white: two parts of white lead and one part of yellow ochre produces a good buff, or white lead may be tinted with French ochre alone.

As an RYB quaternary colour, it is the colour produced by an equal mix of the tertiary colours citron and russet. The hex RGB colour value of the Buff swatch as an RYB quaternary colour is E0AB76.

== Etymology ==
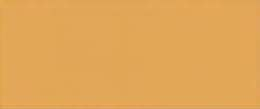
Buff after A. Maerz

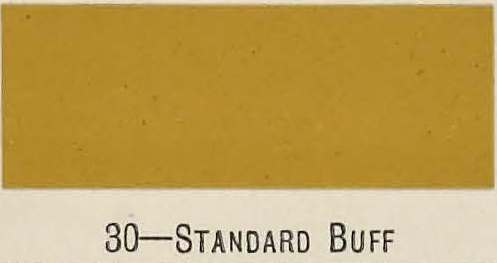
Standard buff after A. S. Jennings.

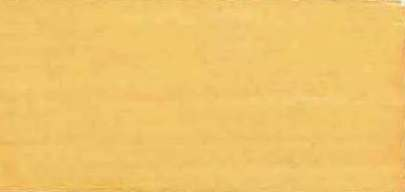
Buff after R. Ridgway.

The first recorded use of the word buff to describe a colour was in The London Gazette of 1686, describing a uniform to be "...a Red Coat with a Buff-colour'd lining". It referred to the colour of undyed buffalo leather, such as soldiers wore as some protection: an eyewitness to the death in the Battle of Edgehill (1642) of Sir Edmund Verney noted "he would neither put on arms [armour] or buff coat the day of the battle". Such buff leather was suitable for buffing or serving as a buffer between polished objects. It is not clear which bovine "buffalo" referred to, but it may not have been any of the animals called "buffalo" today.

=== Derived terms ===
The word buff meaning "enthusiast" or "expert" (US English) derives from the colour "buff", specifically from the buff-coloured uniform facings of 19th-century New York City volunteer firemen, who inspired partisan followers among particularly keen fire watchers.

"In the buff", today meaning naked, originally applied to English soldiers wearing the buff leather tunic that was their uniform until the 17th century. The "naked" signification is due to the perception that (English) skin is buff-coloured.

== In nature ==
=== Geology ===
Sand, rock, and loess tend to be buff in many areas.

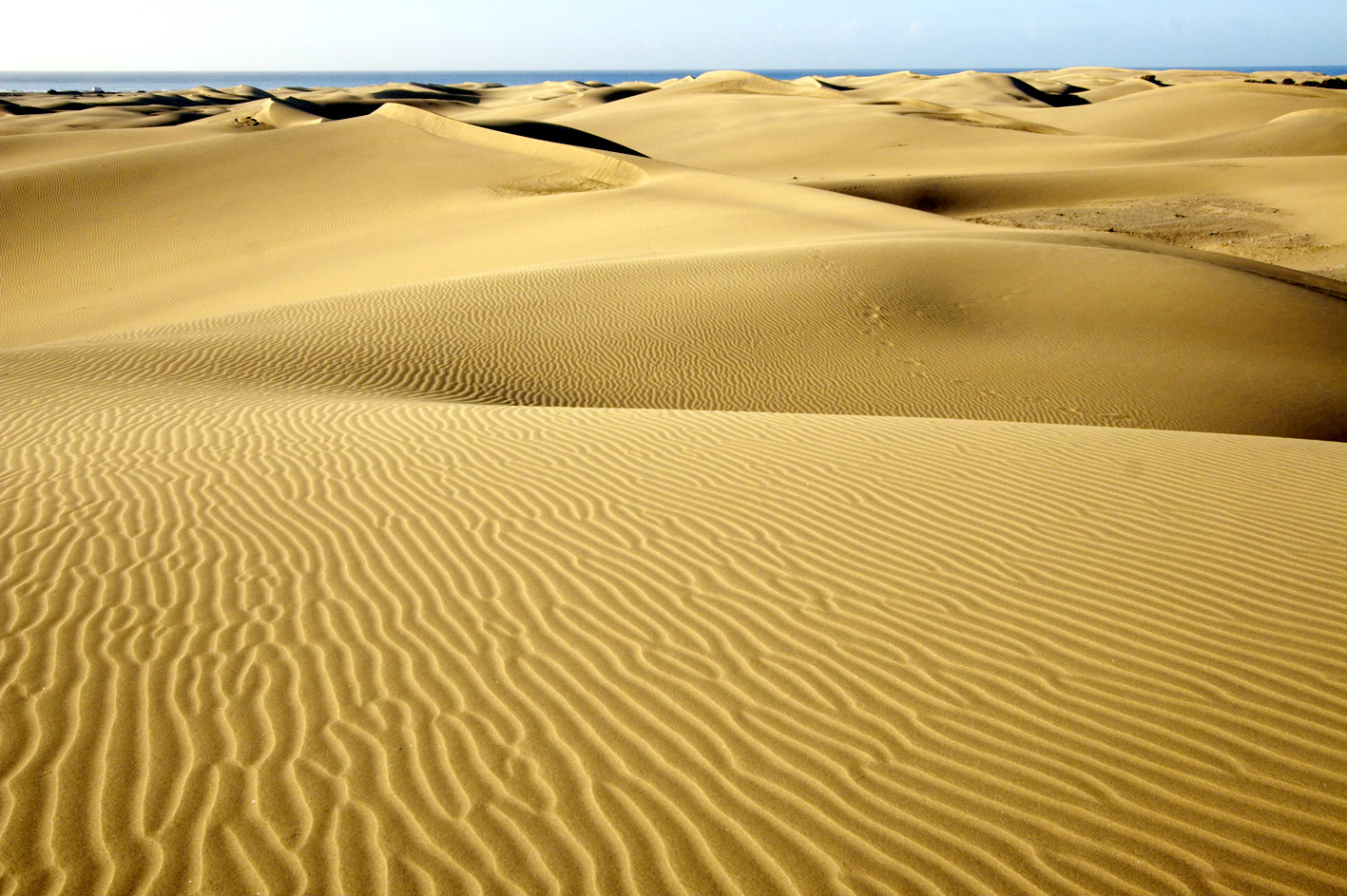
Buff sand

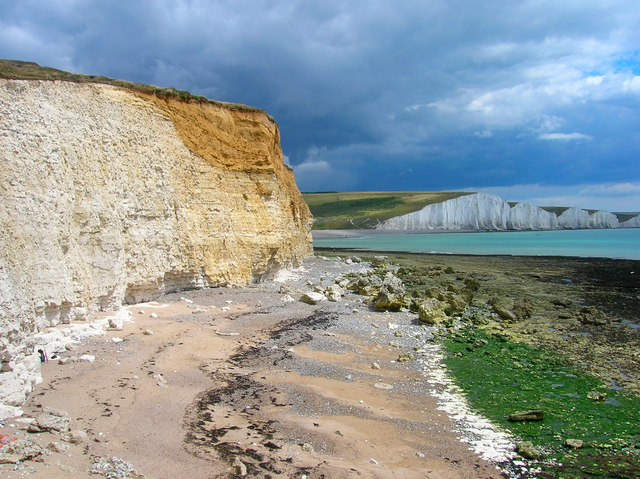
Buff rock at the top of a cliff

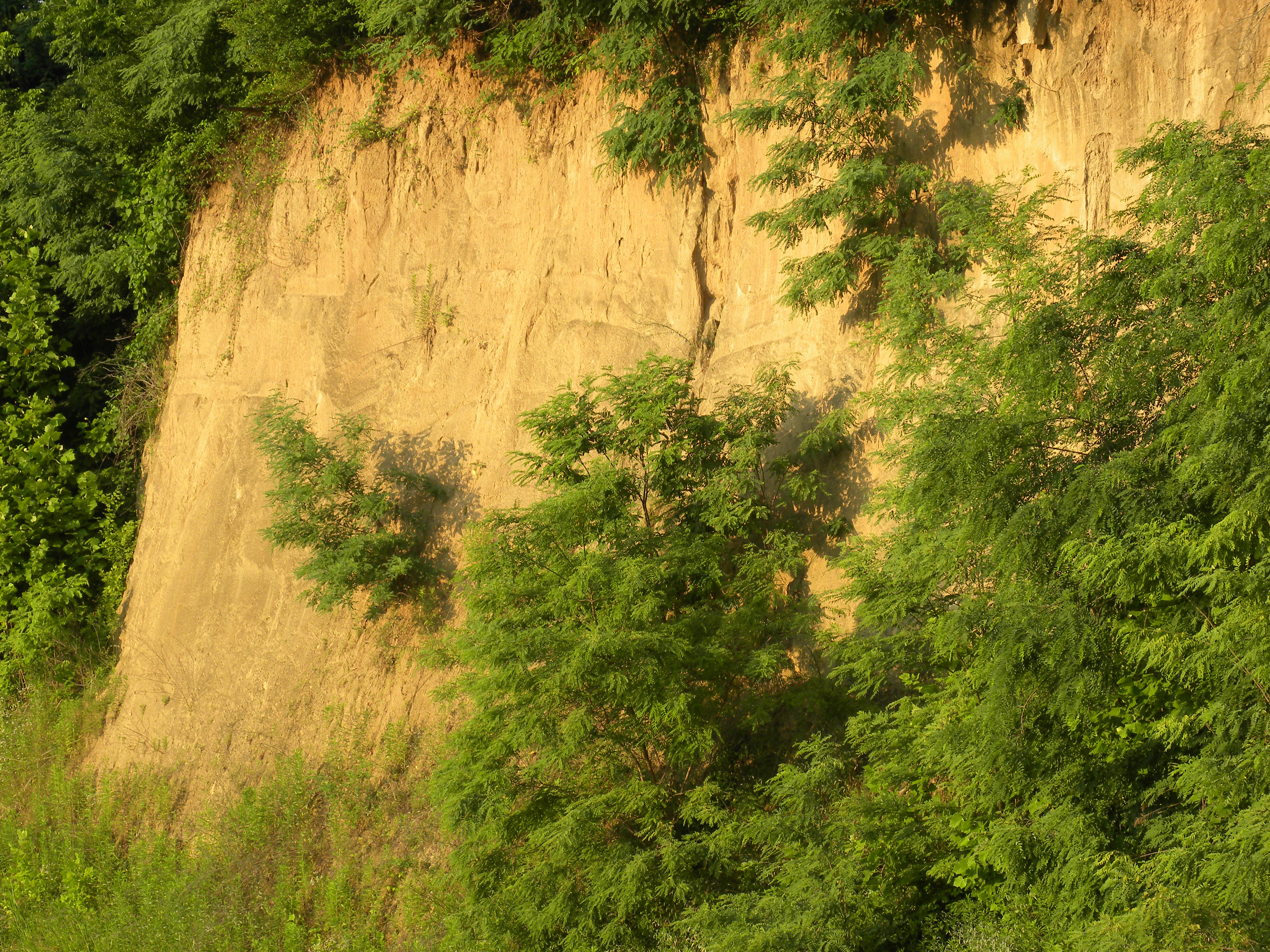
Buff loess

=== Natural selection ===
Because buff is effective in camouflage, it is often naturally selected.

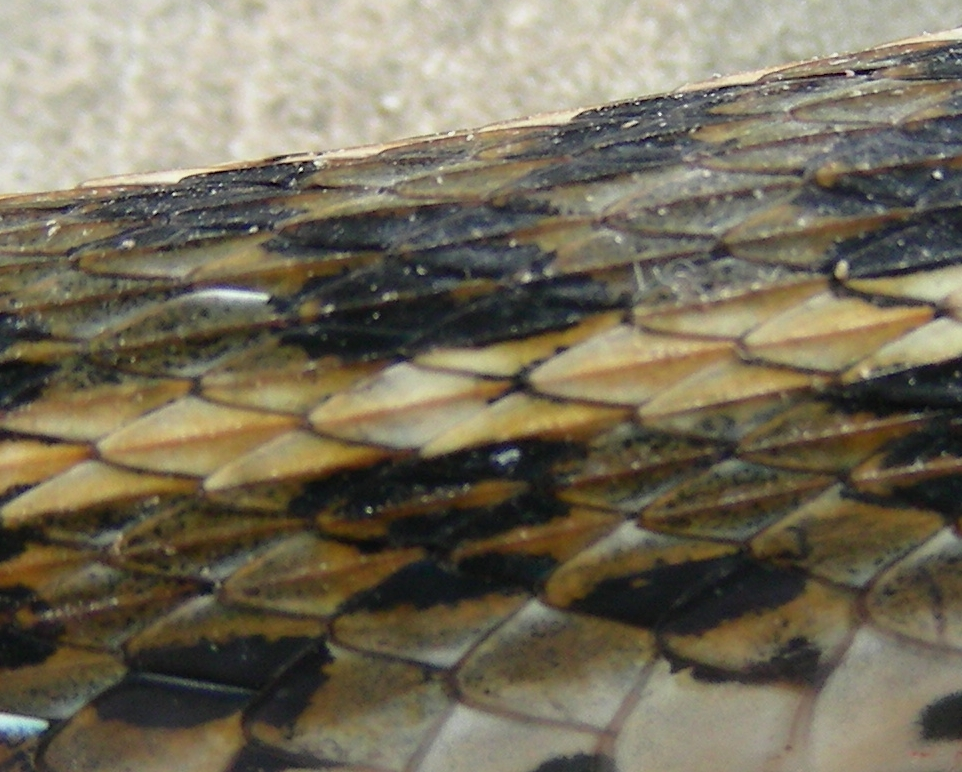
Buff bands on a snake

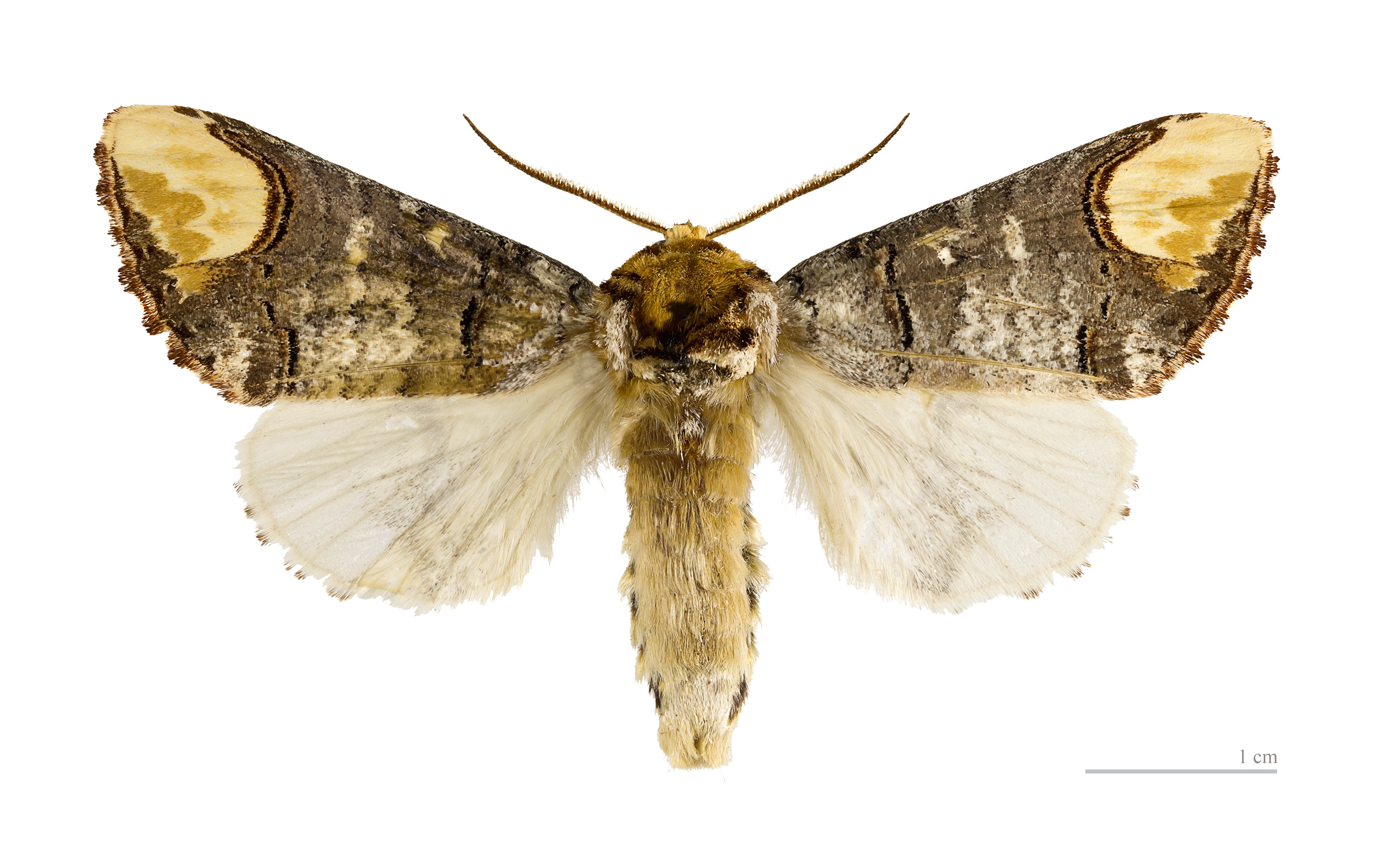
A moth with buff wingtips (Phalera bucephala)

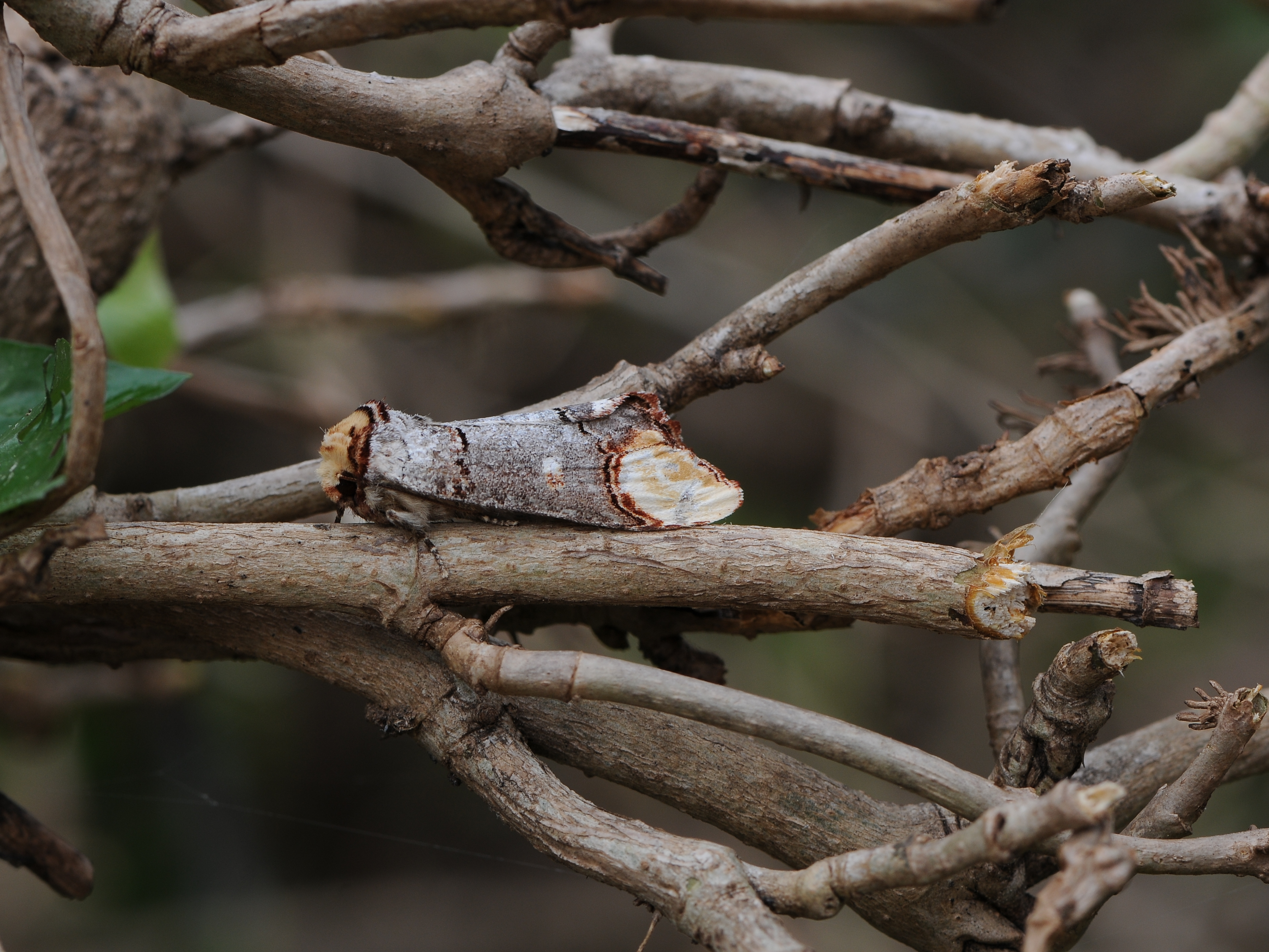
The buff wingtips of this moth aid in camouflage.

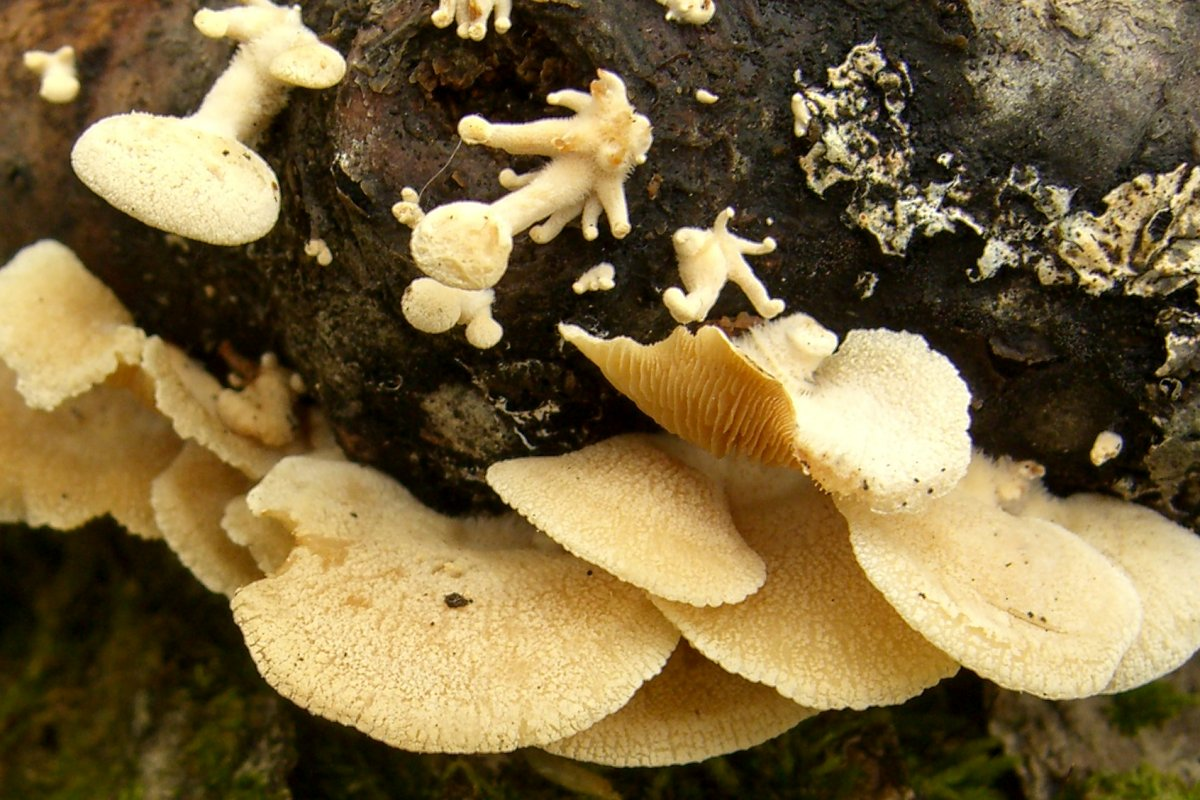
Buff fungi

Many species are named for their buff markings, including the buff arches moth, the buff-bellied climbing mouse, and at least sixty birds, including the buff-fronted quail-dove, the buff-vented bulbul, and the buff-spotted flufftail.

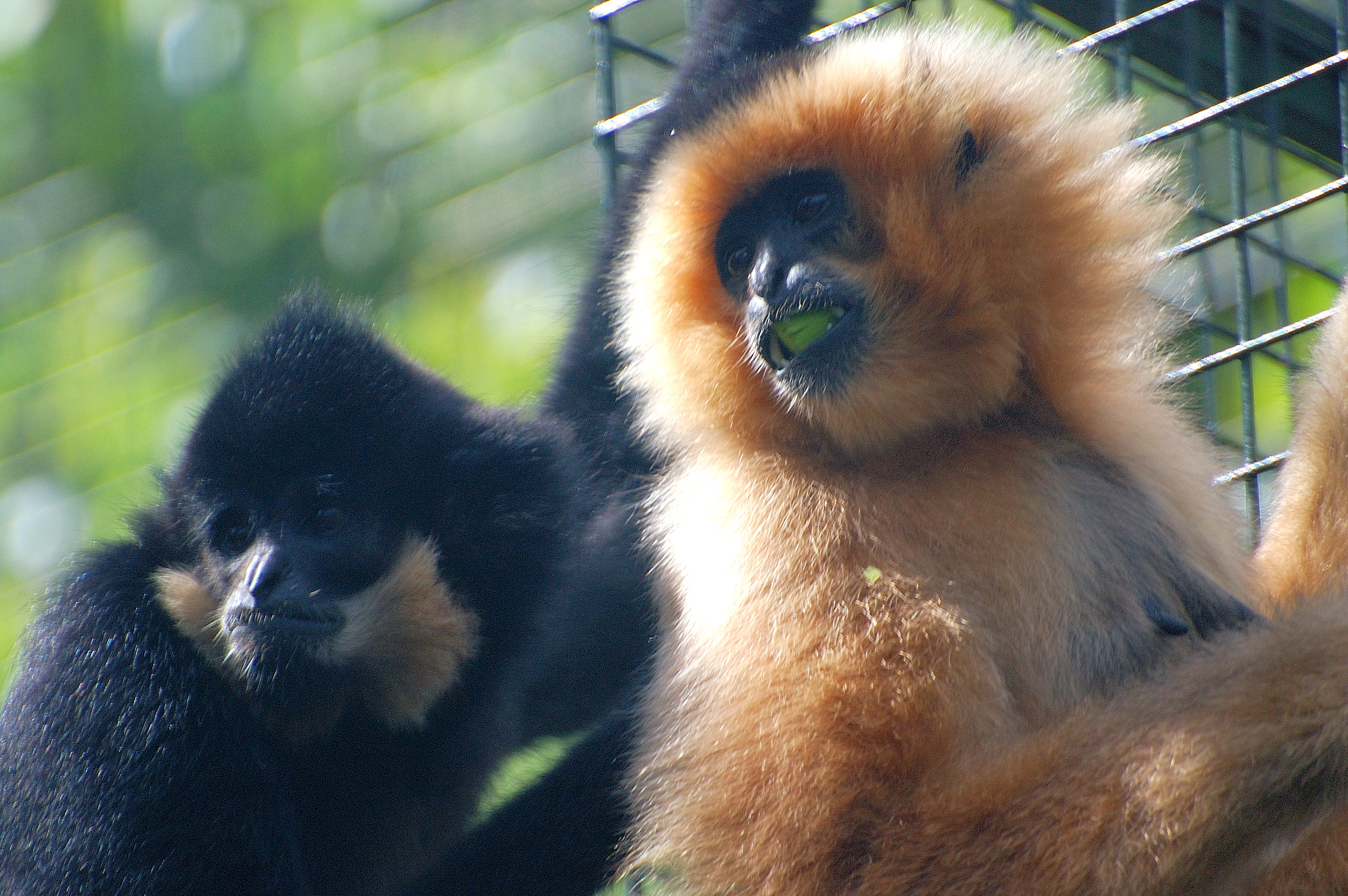
A pair of northern buffed-cheeked gibbons

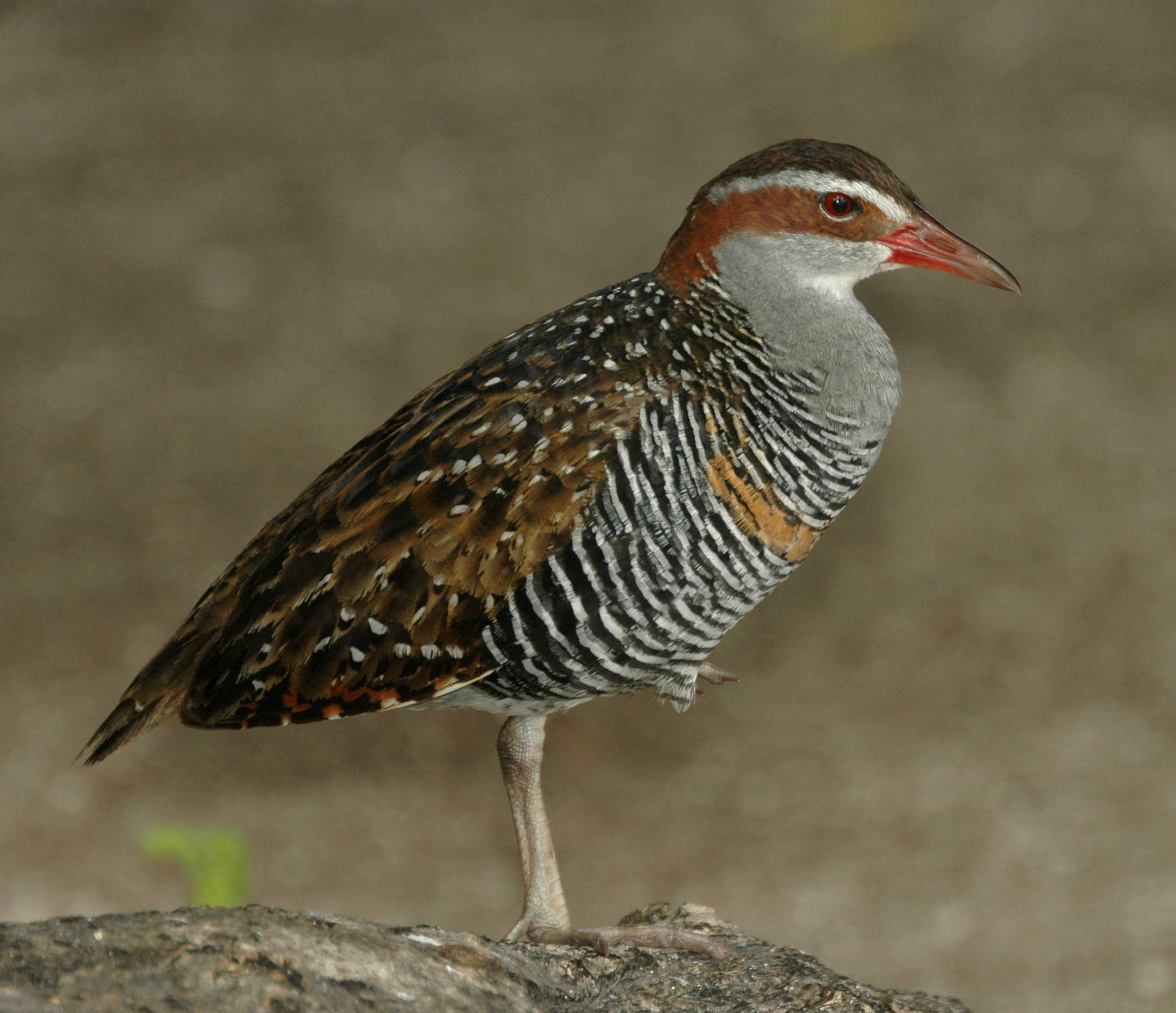
The buff-banded rail

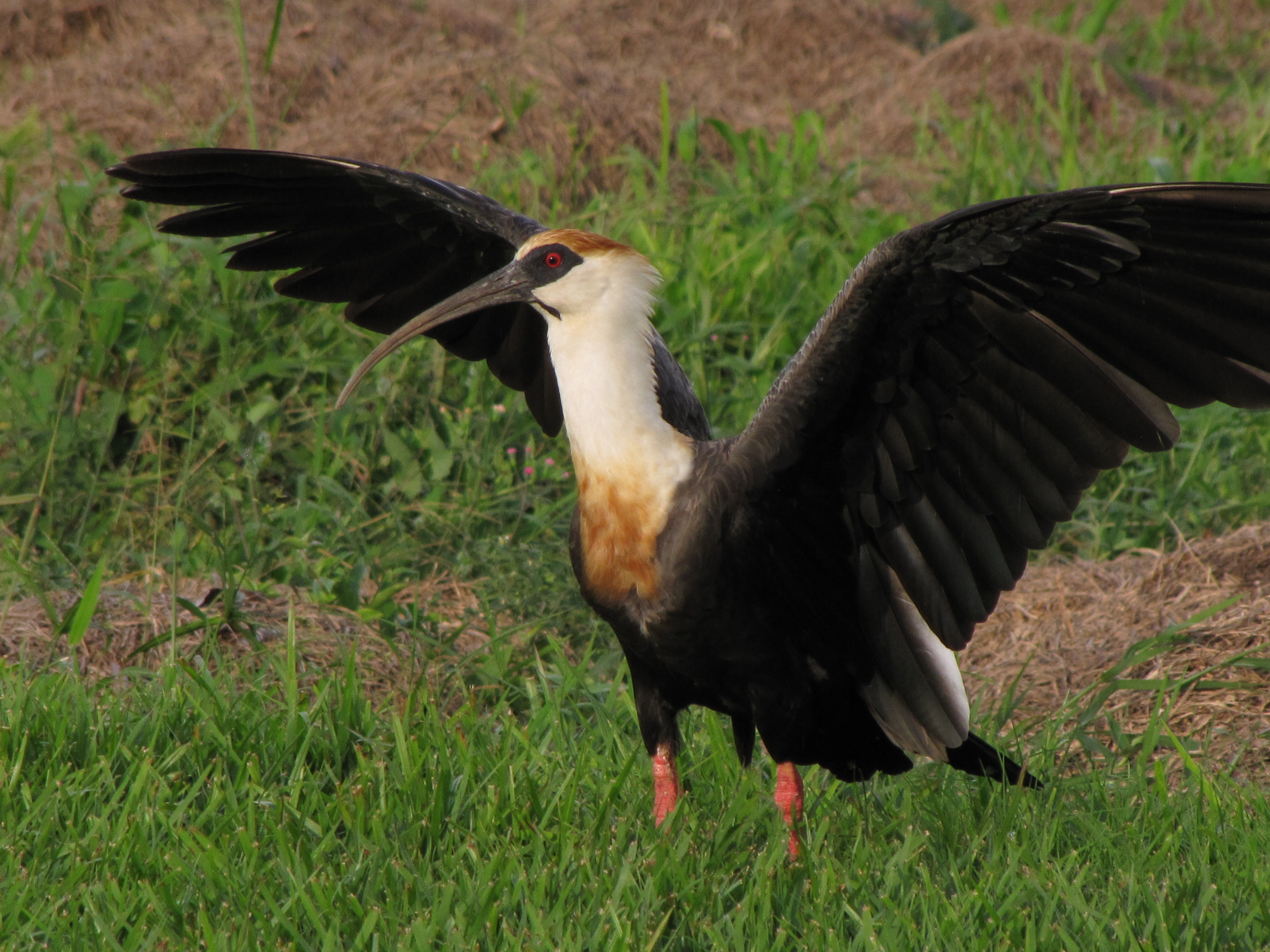
The buff-necked ibis

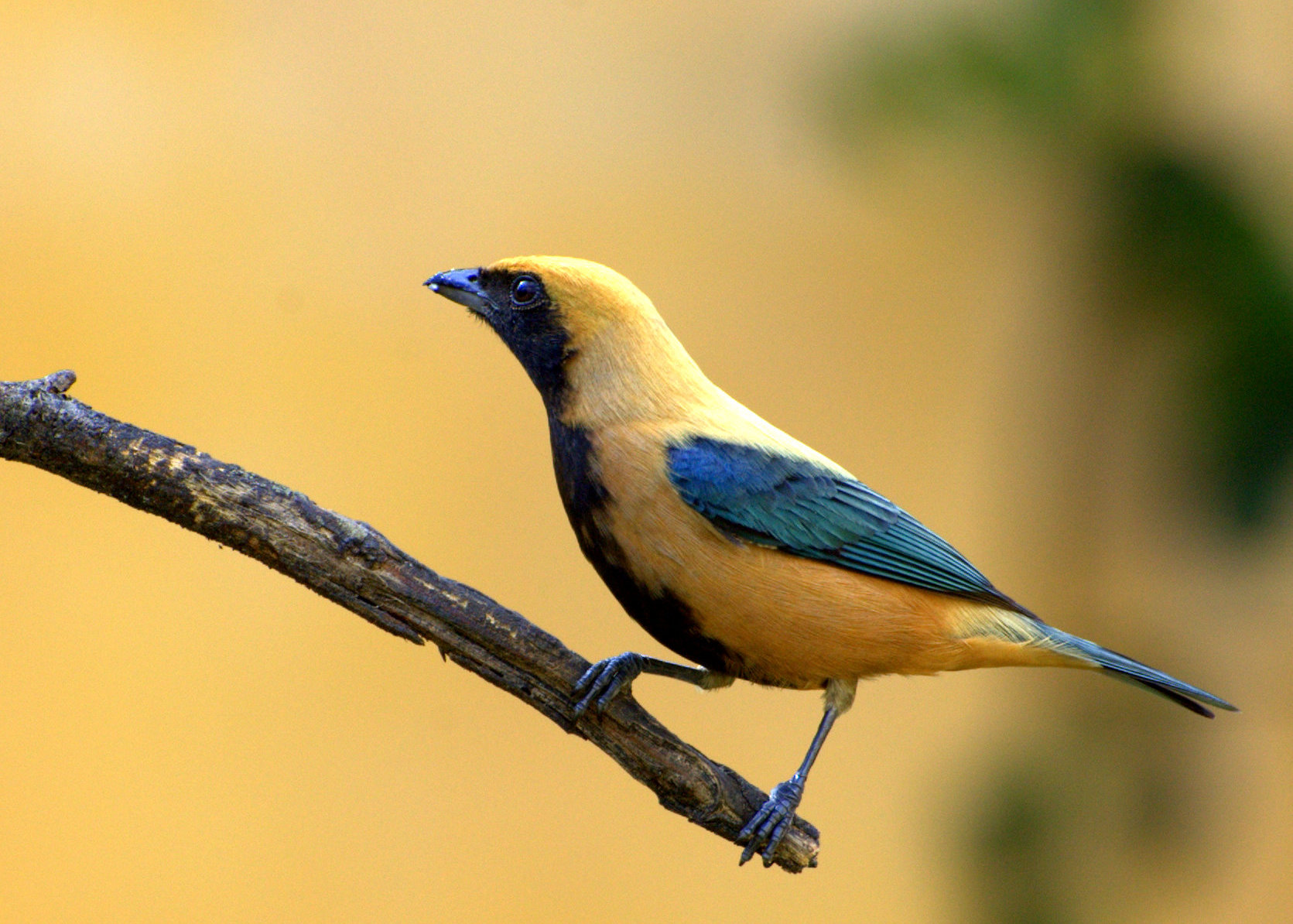
The burnished-buff tanager

== In culture ==
=== Architecture ===
In areas where buff raw materials are available, buff walls and buildings may be found. Cotswold stone is an example of such a material, as is Cream City brick.

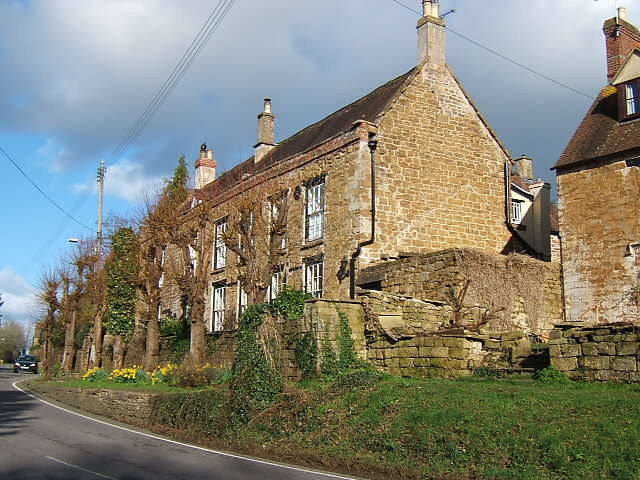
Traditional buff stone buildings

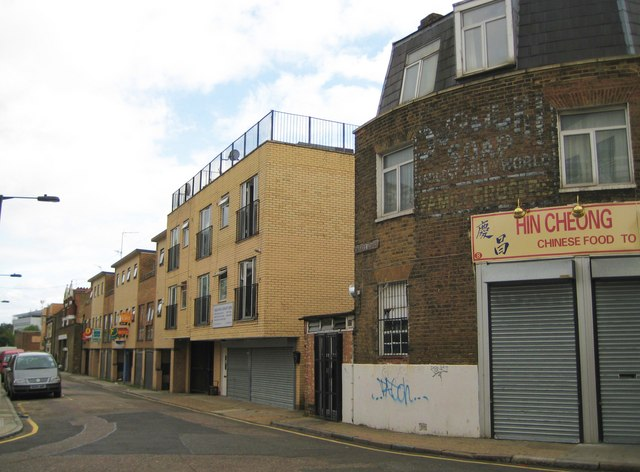
Modern buff brick buildings (centre)

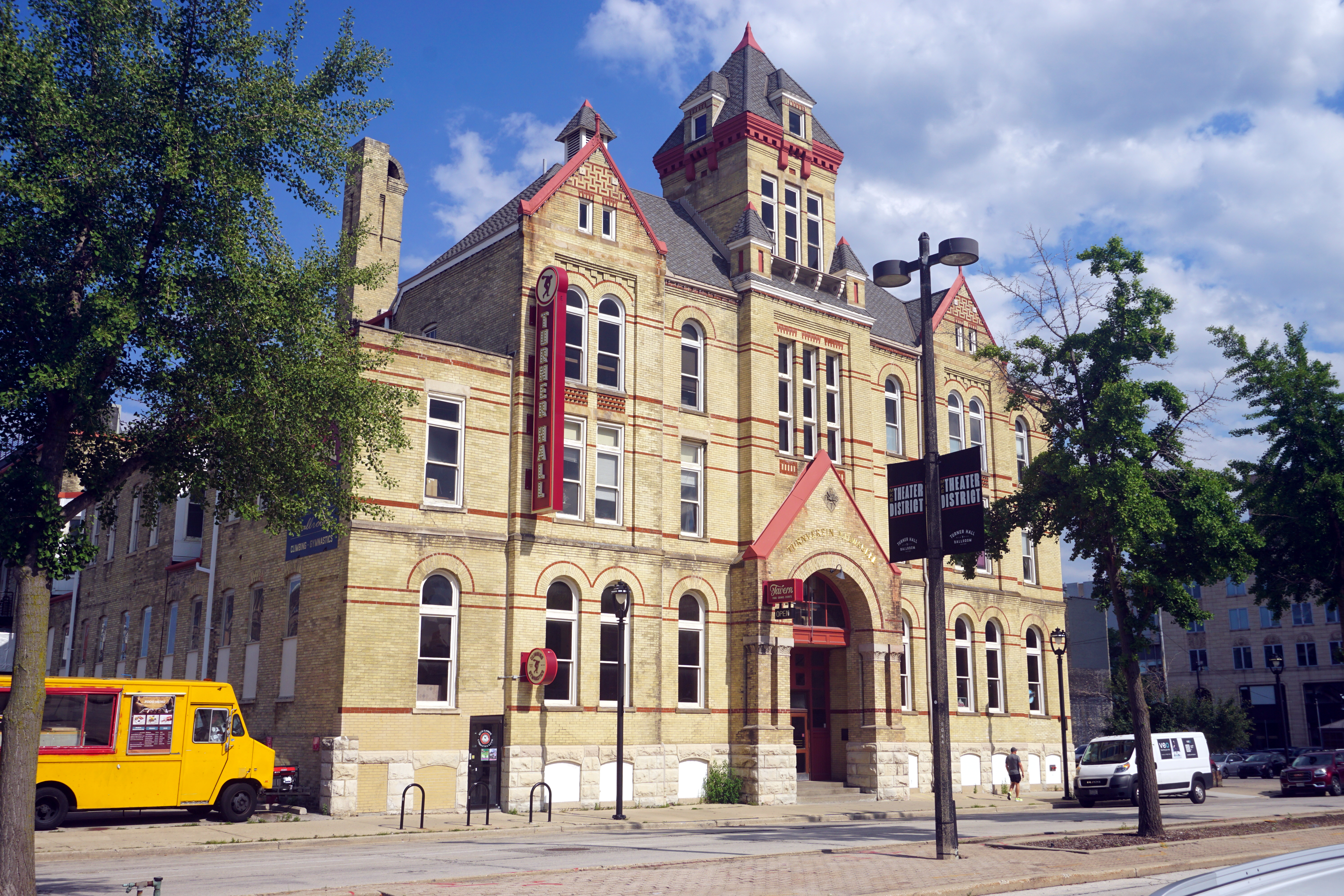
Cream City brick

=== Stationery and art ===
Unless bleached or dyed, paper products, such as Manila paper, tend to be buff. Buff envelopes are used extensively in commercial mailings.

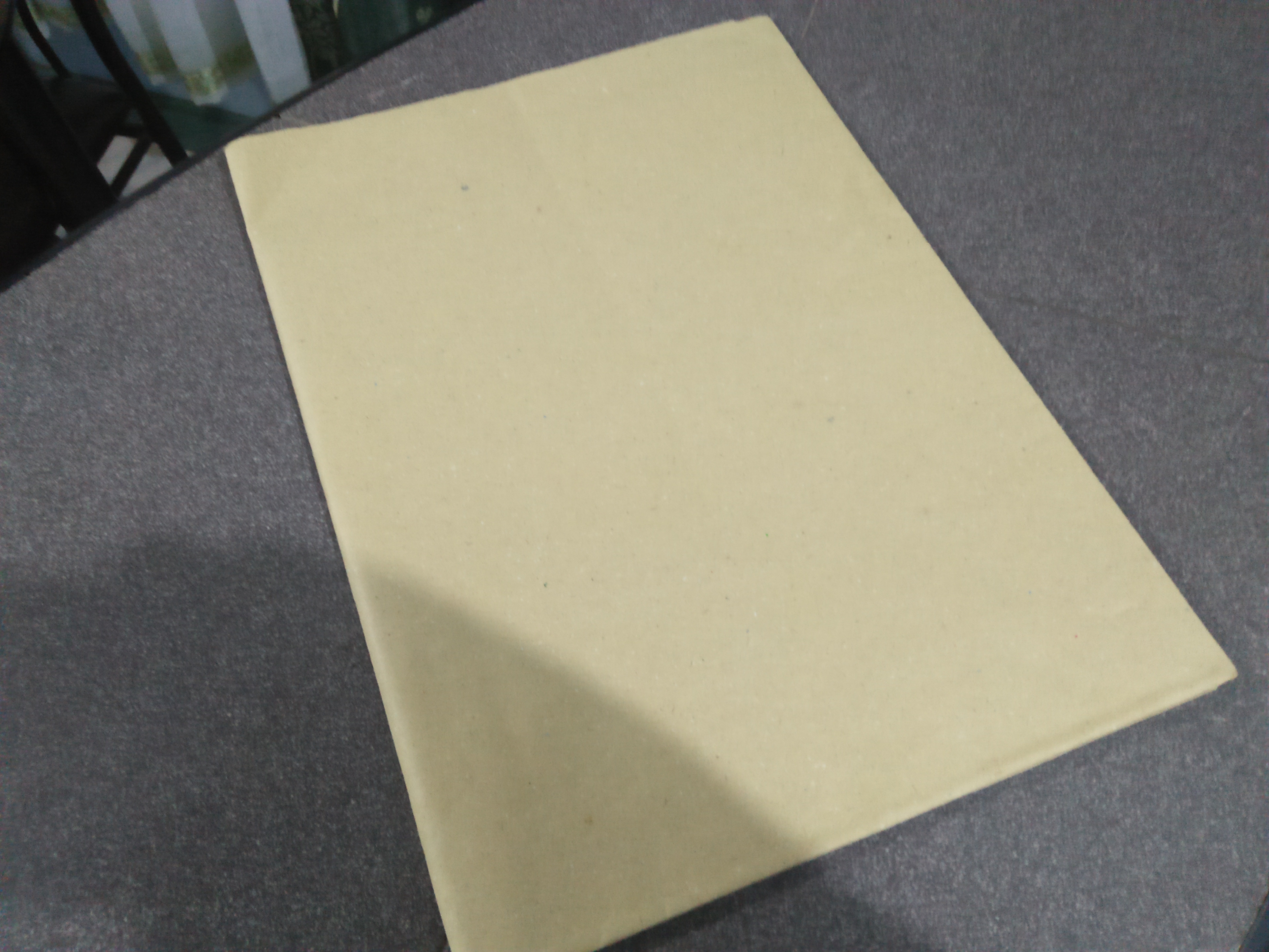
Manila paper

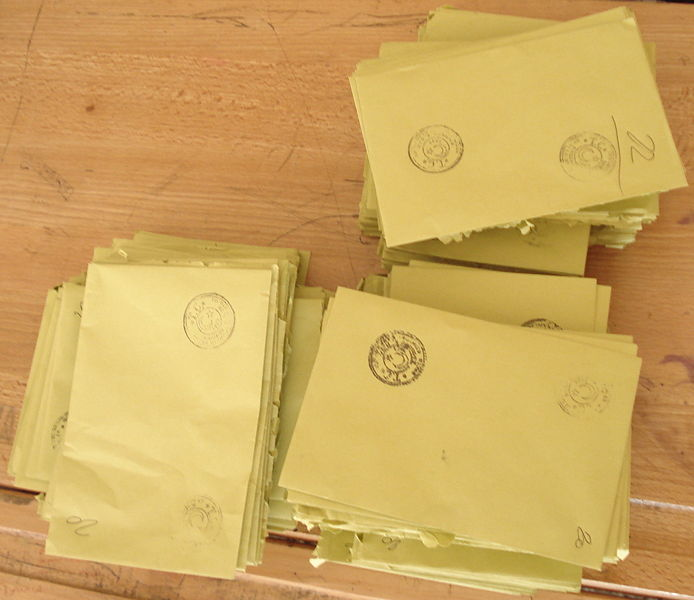
Buff envelopes

Buff paper is sometimes favoured by artists seeking a neutral background colour for drawings, especially those featuring the colour white.

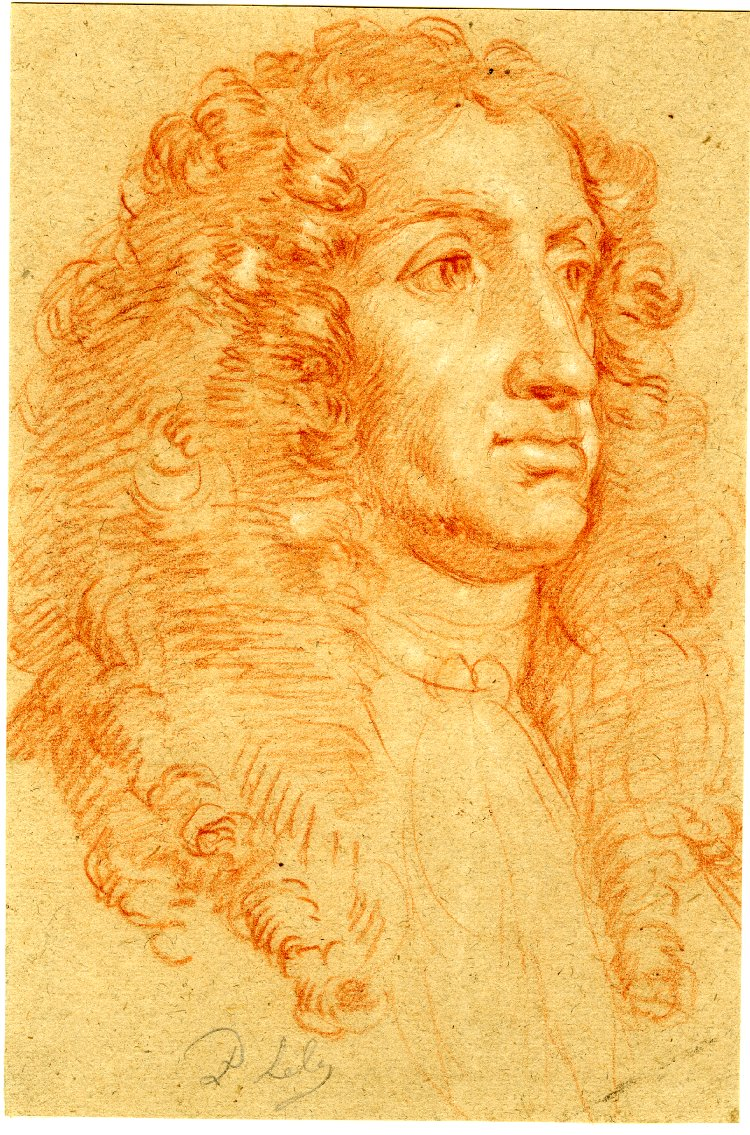
Red and white chalk portrait on buff paper

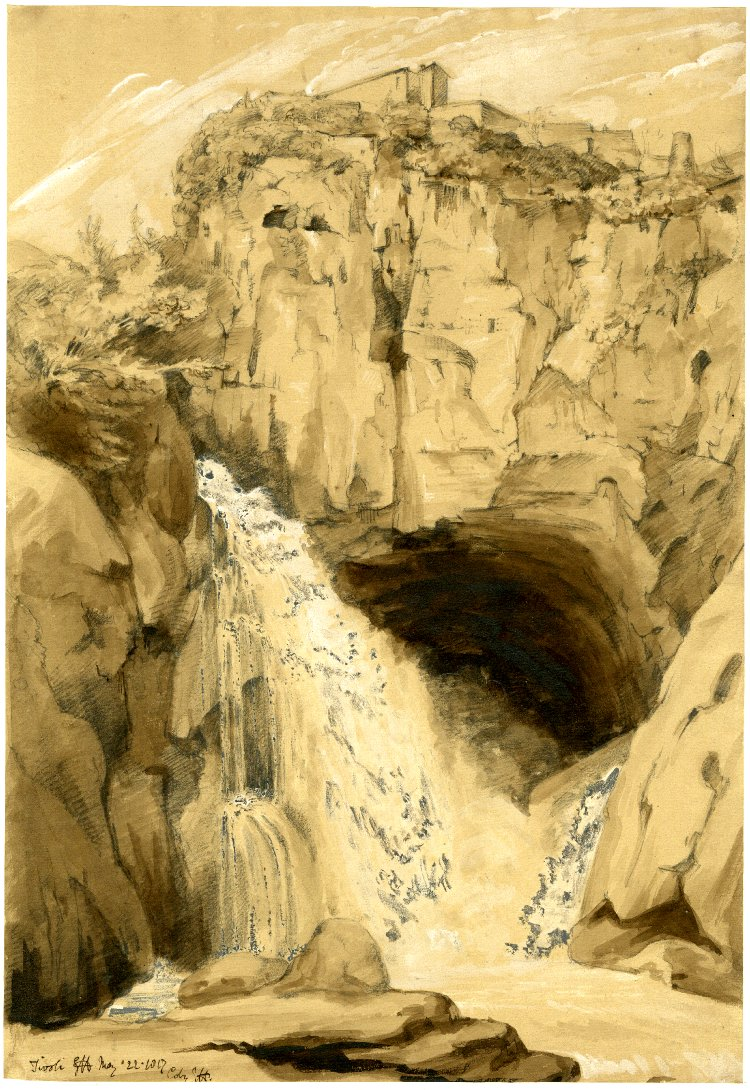
Black chalk with brown wash, heightened with white on buff paper

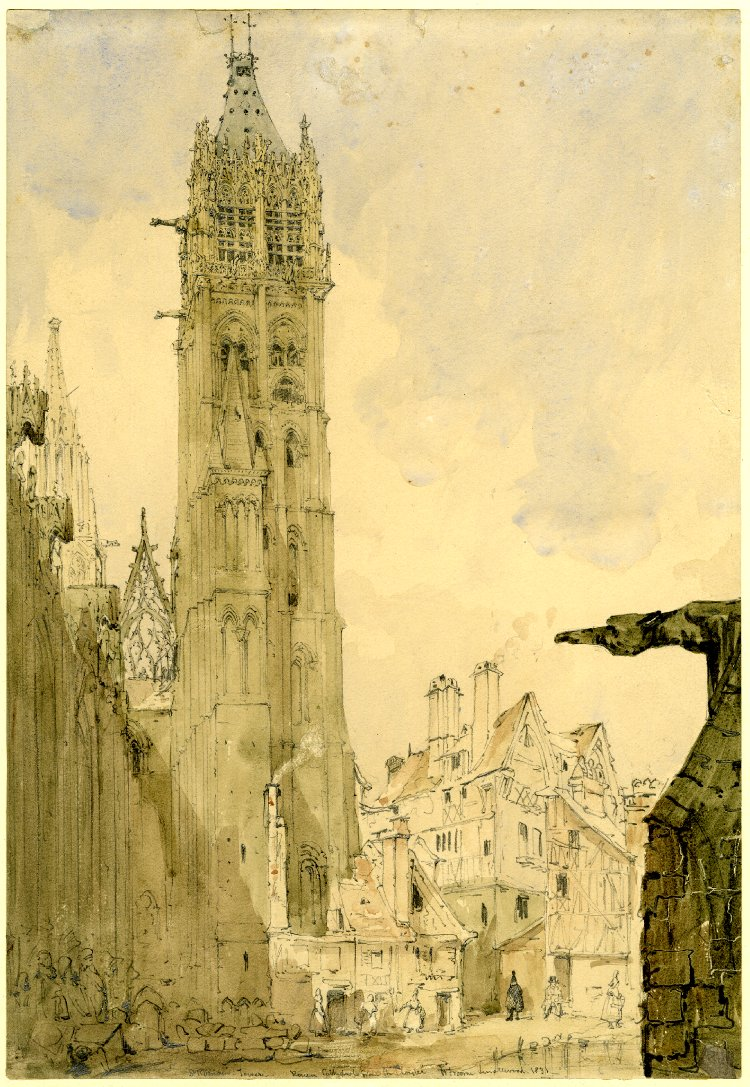
Graphite drawing with watercolour wash on buff paper

=== Artificial selection ===
Buff domesticated animals and plants have been created, including dogs, cats, and poultry. The word buff is used in written standards of several breeds, and some, such as the Buff turkey, are specifically named "buff".

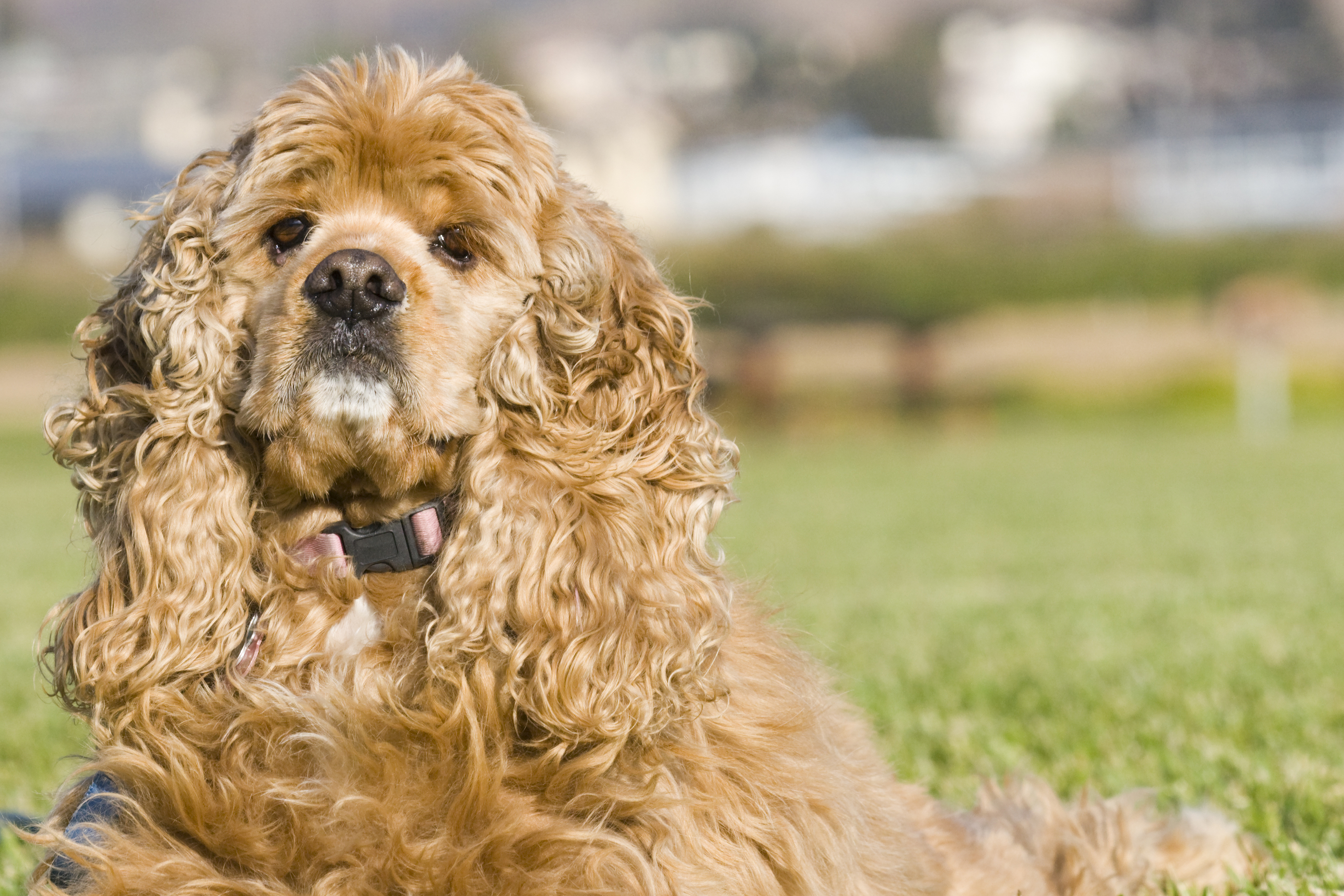
A buff gun dog

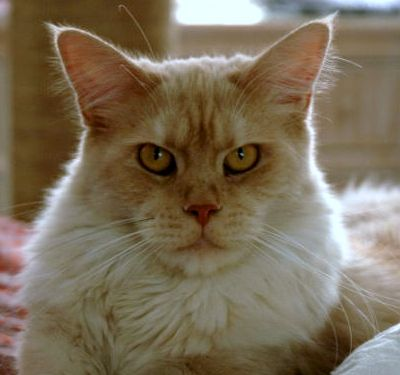
A buff mousing cat

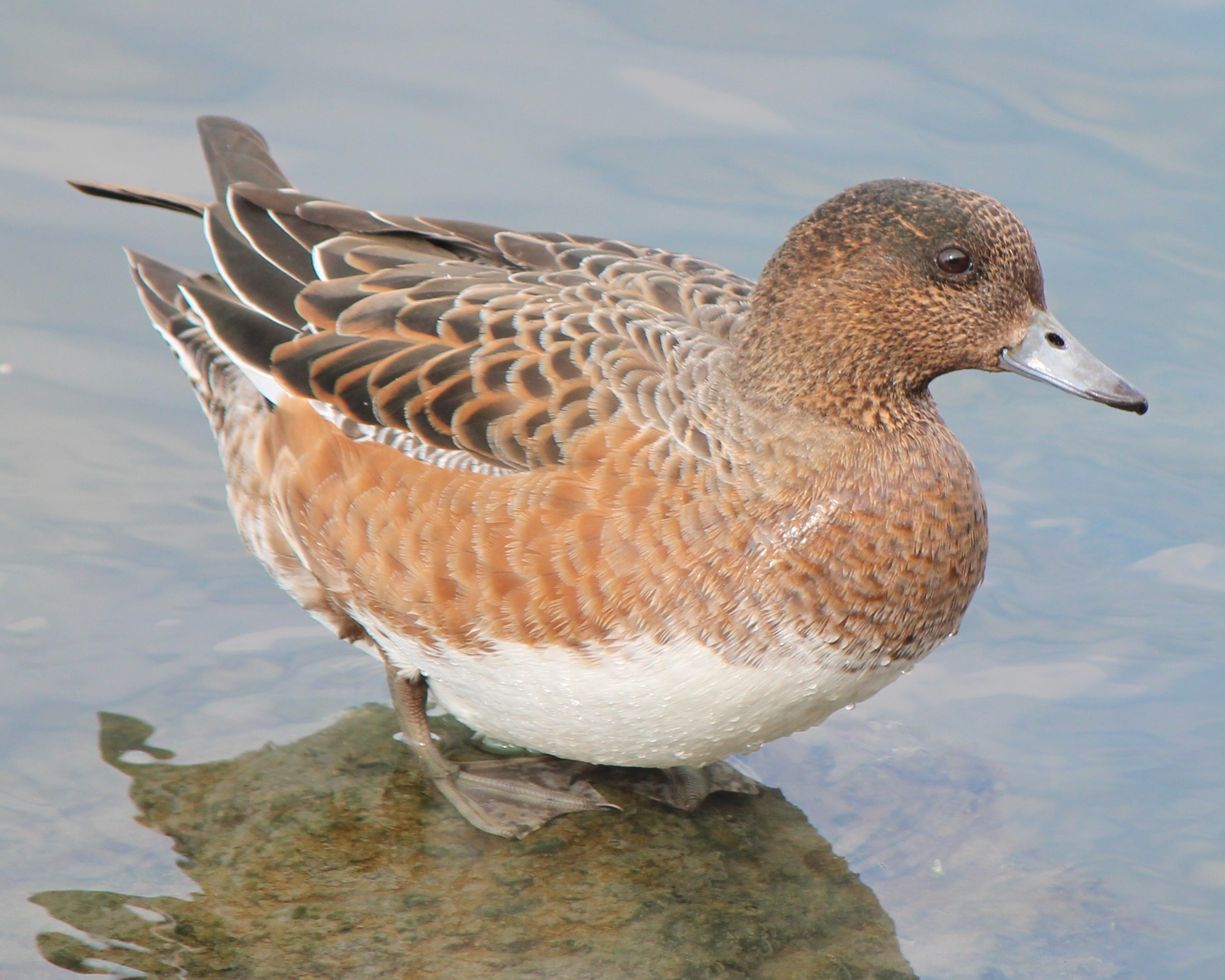
A female eurasian wigeon

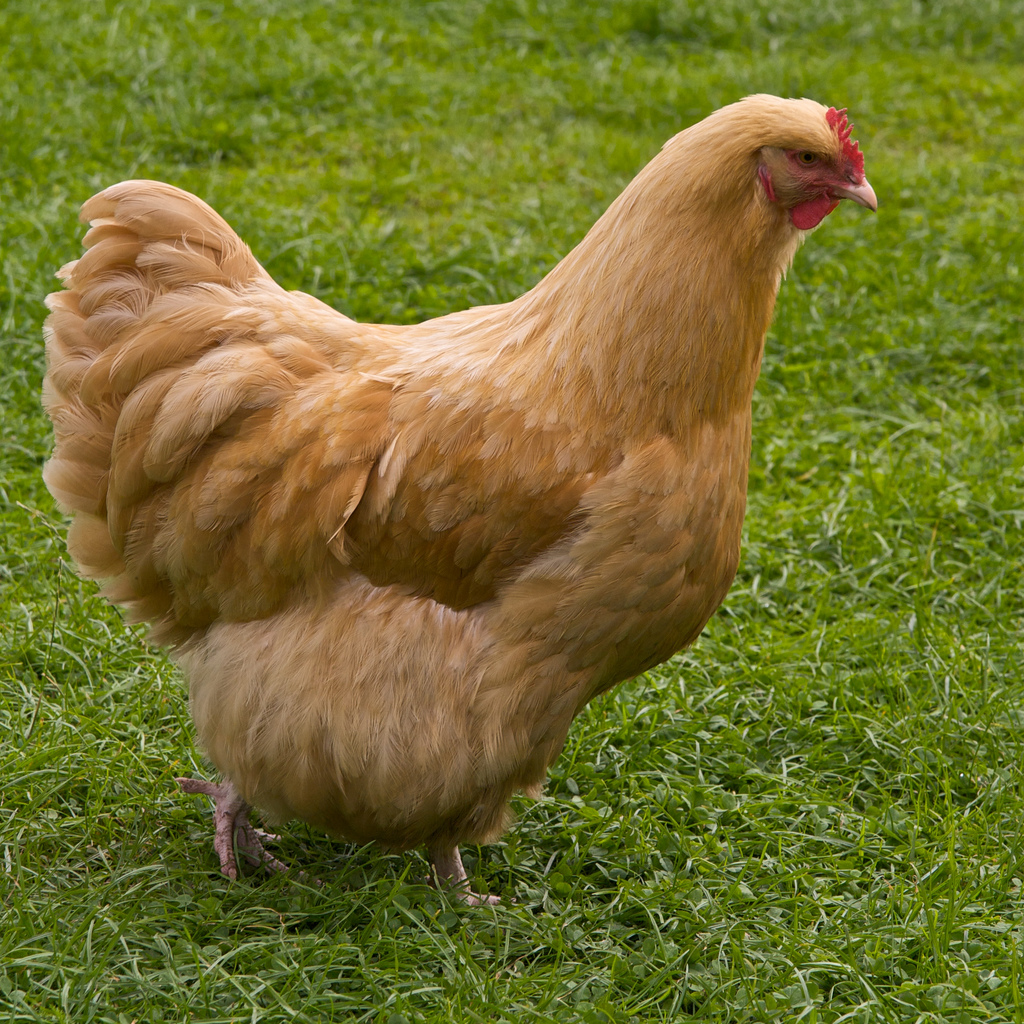
A buff chicken

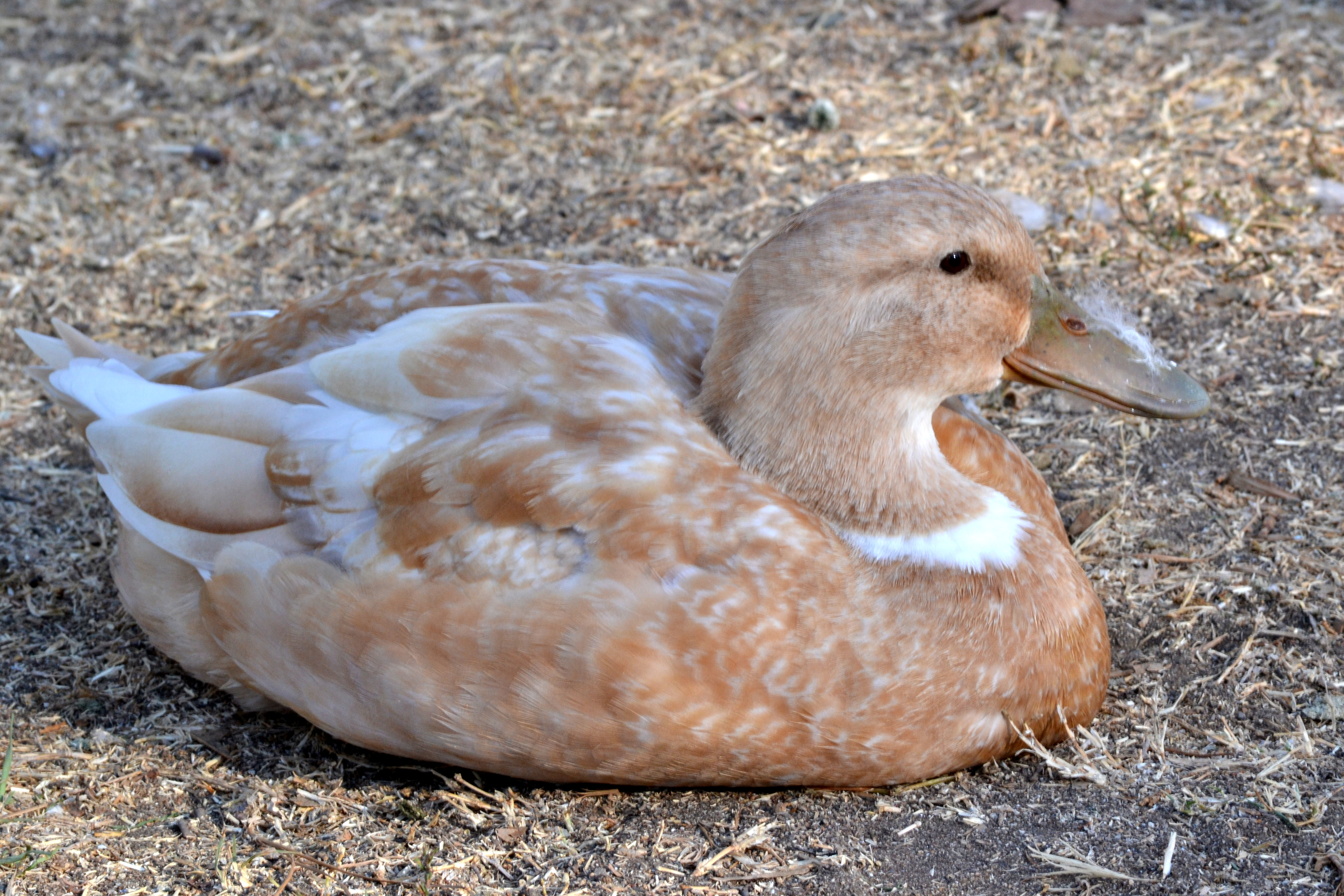
The Buff Orpington Duck

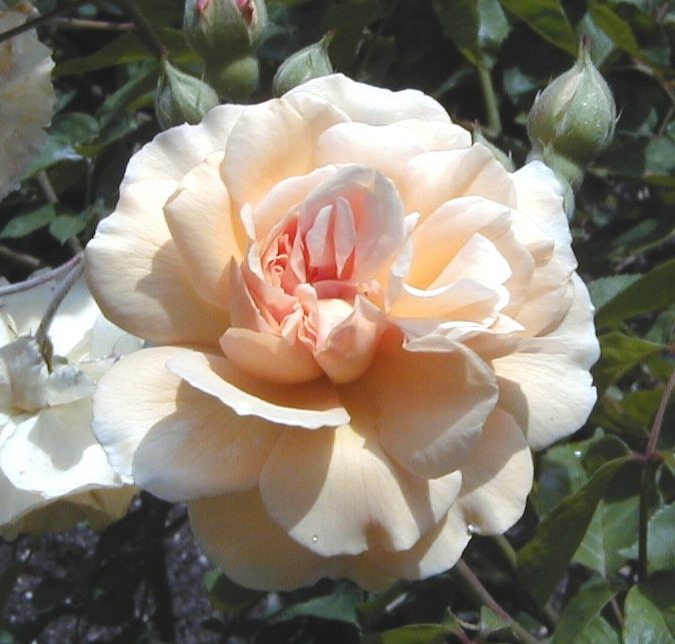
The rose cultivar 'Buff Beauty'.

=== Clothing ===
In 16th- and 17th-century European cultures, buff waistcoats ("vests" in American English), were considered proper casual wear. In the 17th century, the traditional colour of formal dress boot uppers was often described as "buff".

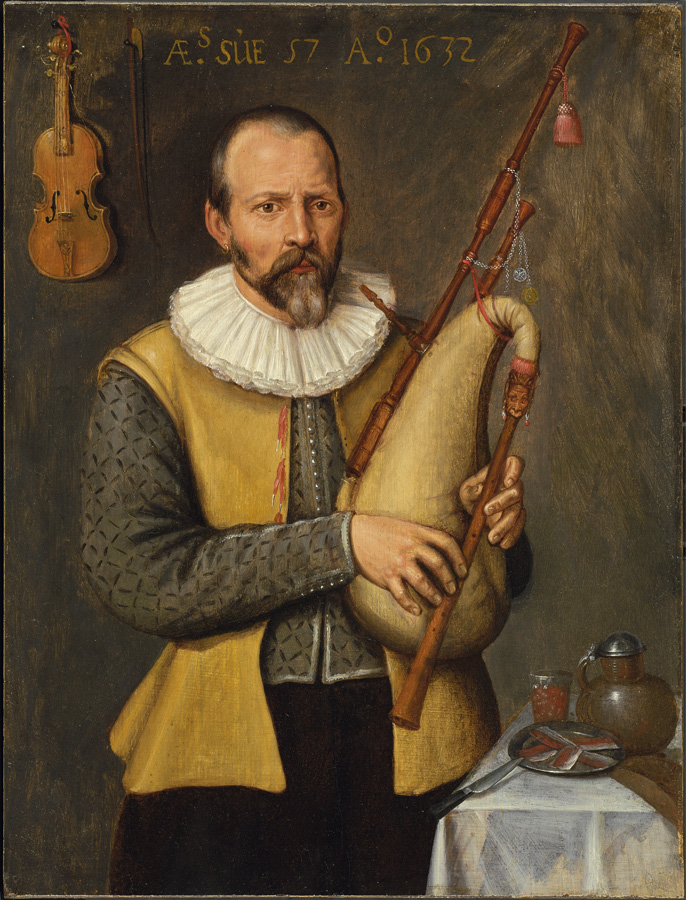
17th-century English musician wearing a buff waistcoat

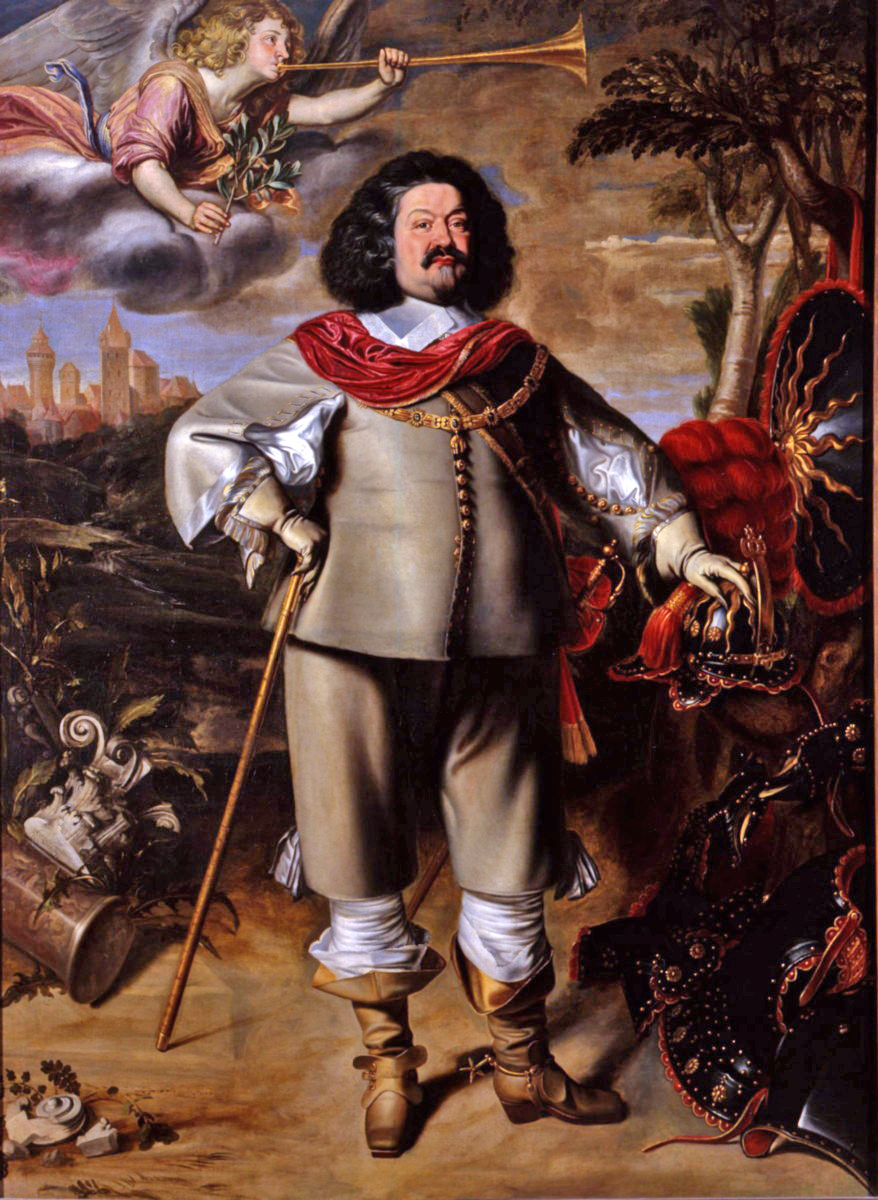
17th-century Italian nobleman wearing buff dress boot uppers

==== John Bull ====
Clothing depicted on John Bull, a national personification of Britain in general and England in particular, in political cartoons and similar graphic works, has often been buff coloured. Bull's buff waistcoats, topcoats, trousers and boot uppers were typical of 18th- and 19th-century Englishmen.

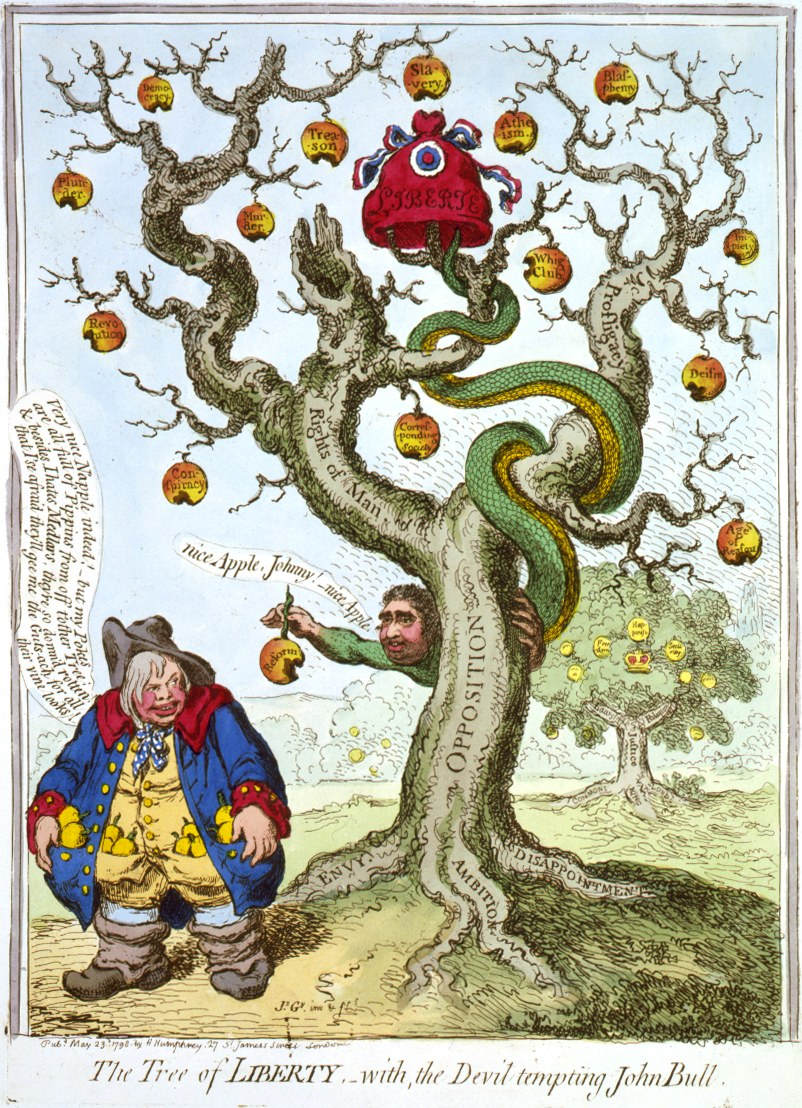
Early depiction of John Bull with the buff clothing typical of an 18th-century Englishman

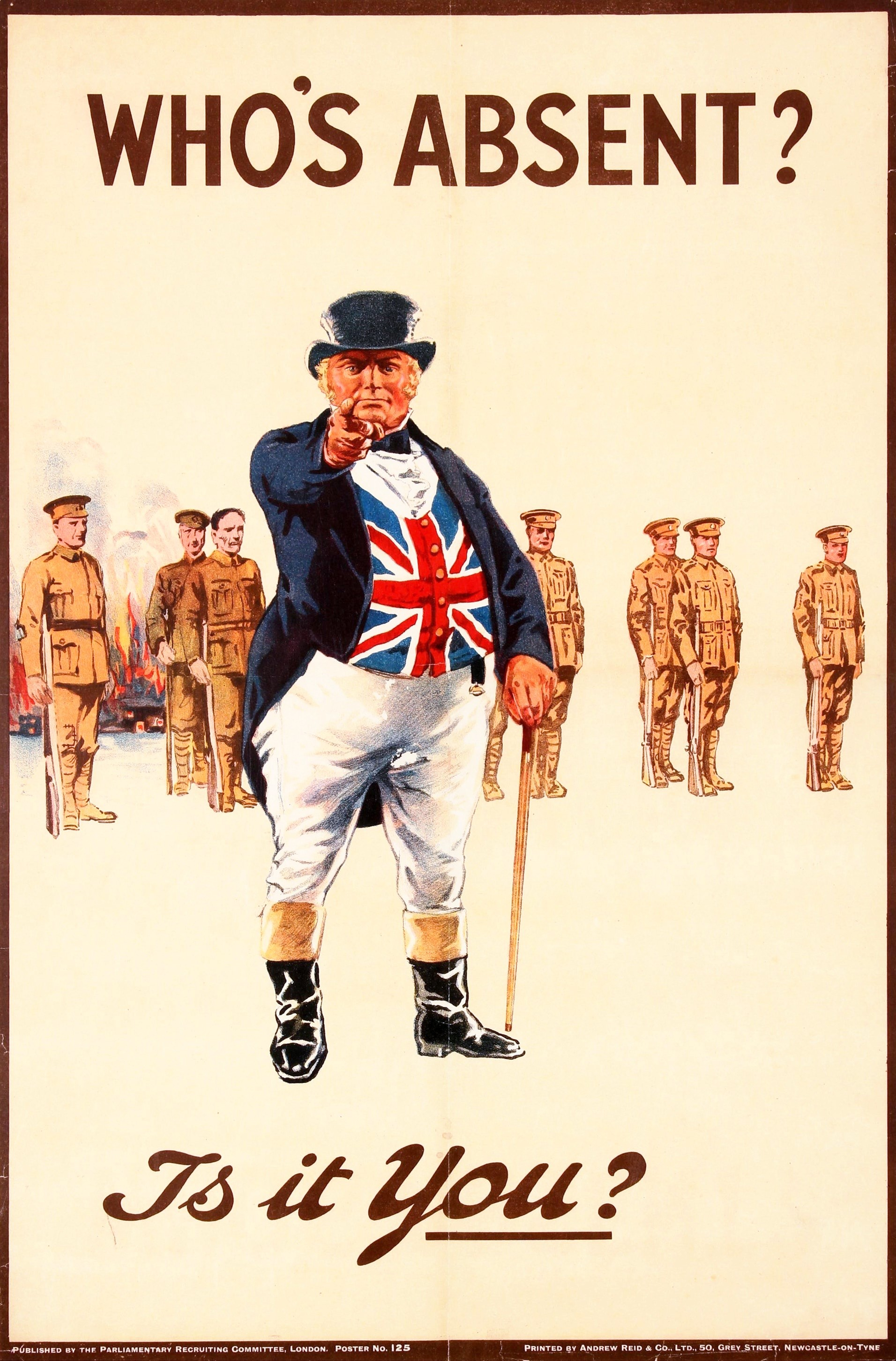
John Bull wearing buff dress boot uppers

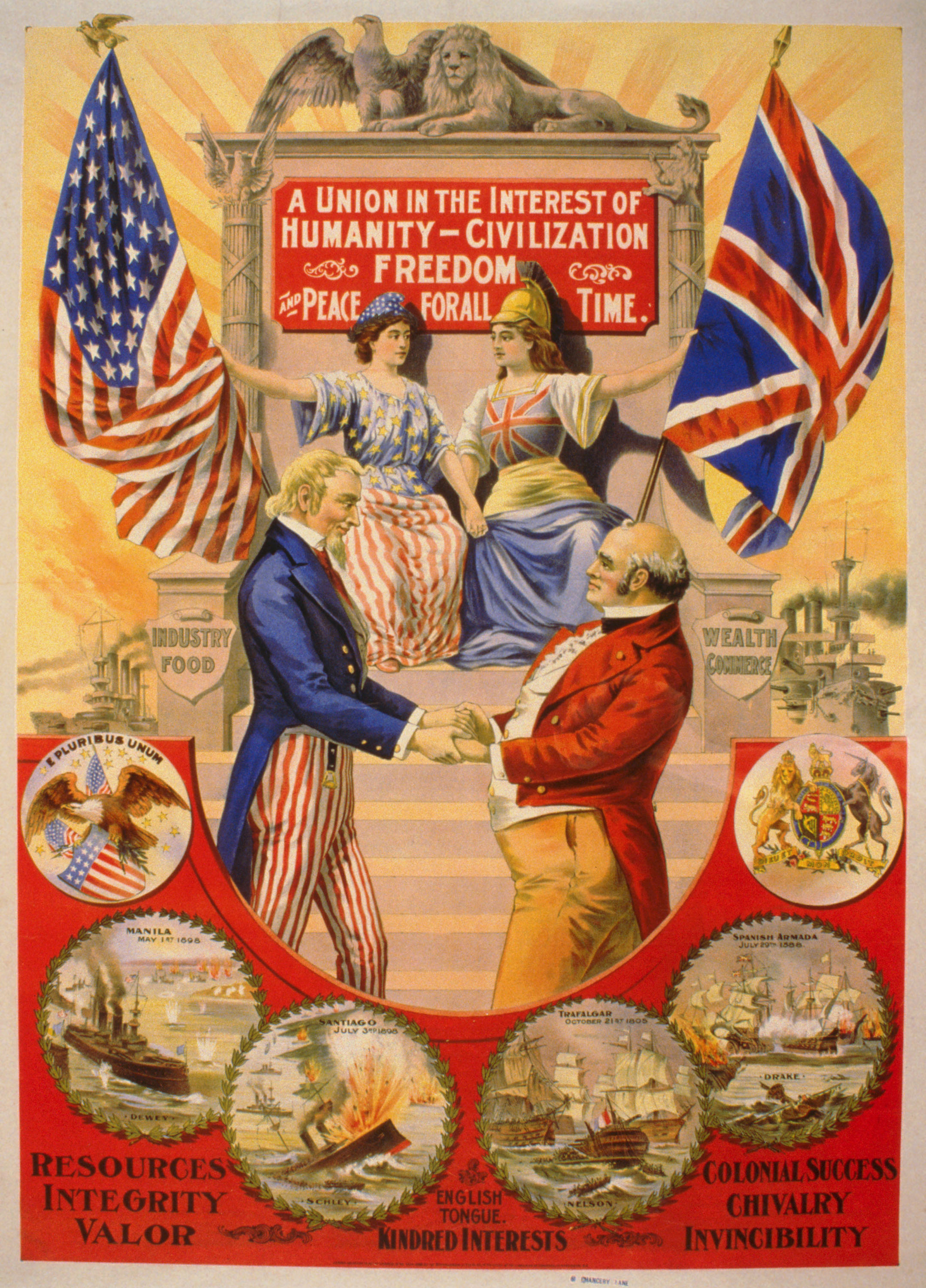
John Bull wearing buff trousers

==== 17th-century military uniforms ====
Buff is a traditional European military uniform colour. Buff has good camouflage qualities as sand, soil, and dry vegetation are buff in many areas. The term buff coat refers to a part of 17th-century European military uniforms. Such coats were intended to protect the wearer, and the strongest and finest leathers tend to be buff, so the term "buff coats" came to refer to all such coats, even if the colour varied.

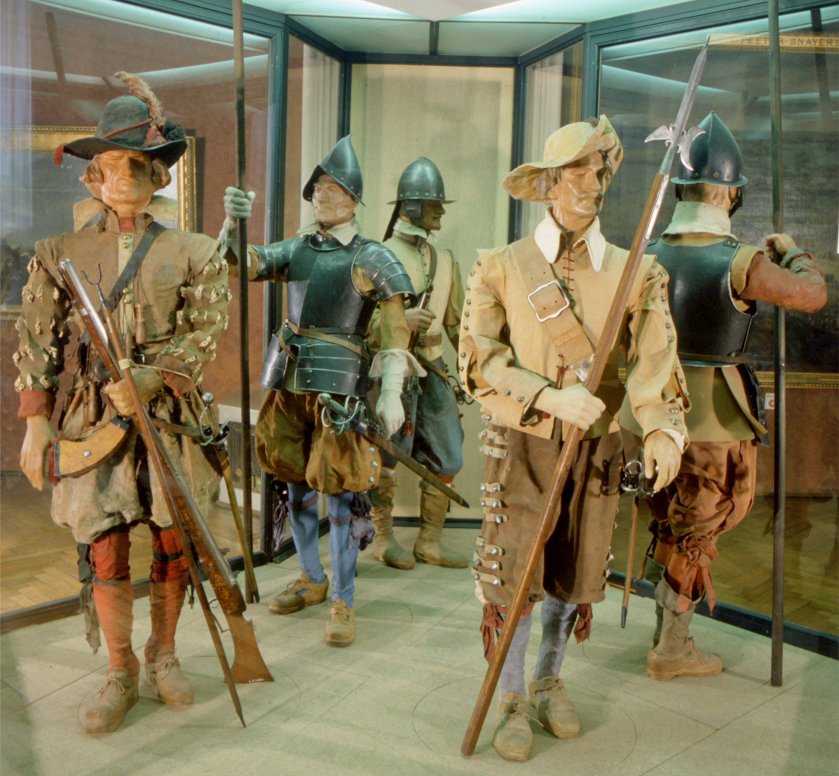
Buff German uniforms

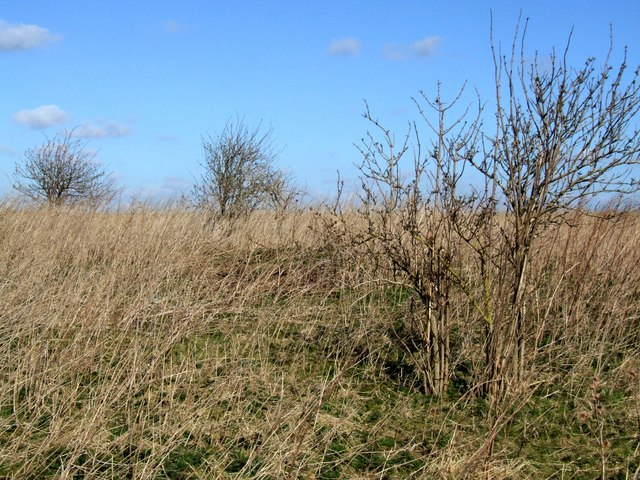
Dry vegetation in Europe

===== British Army =====
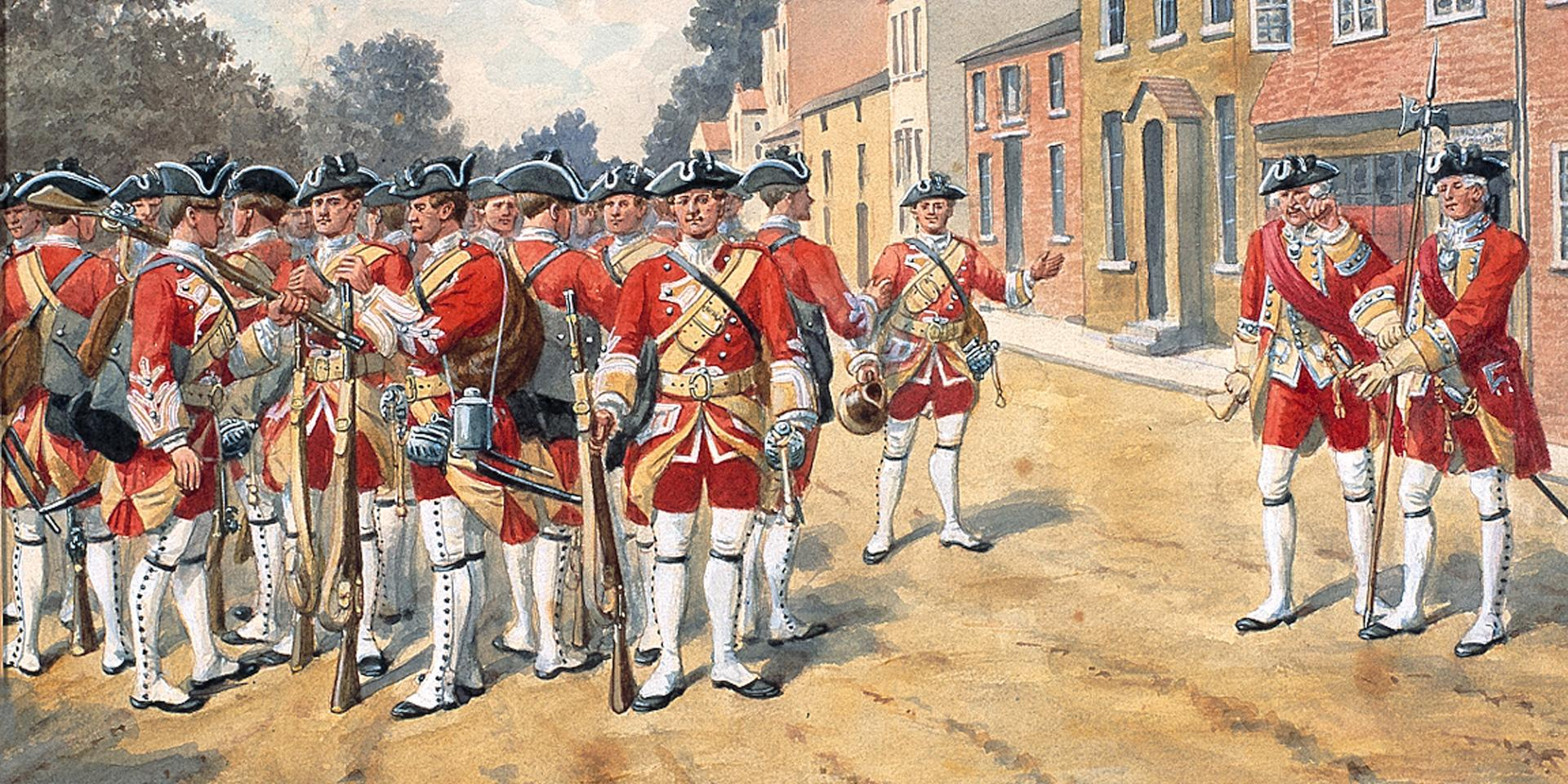
The 3rd Regiment of Foot in 1751

The 3rd Regiment of Foot, renamed the East Kent Regiment in 1881, was nicknamed "The Buffs" from the facing colour of their waistcoats. The phrase "Steady the Buffs!", popularised by Rudyard Kipling in his 1888 work Soldiers Three, originated from an incident that occurred in 1858 during the regiment's garrison duties in Malta; a regimental adjutant named Edmond Cotter, not wanting to be shown up in front of his former regiment, the 21st (Royal North British Fusilier) Regiment of Foot, spurred his men on with the words: "Steady, the Buffs! The Fusiliers are watching you."

=== US Army ===
The uniform of the American Continental Army was buff and blue.

Buff is the traditional colour of the US Army Quartermaster Corps.

The US Army Institute of Heraldry specifies a "buff" tincture for certain coats of arms, often treating it as a metal for purposes of the rule of tincture.

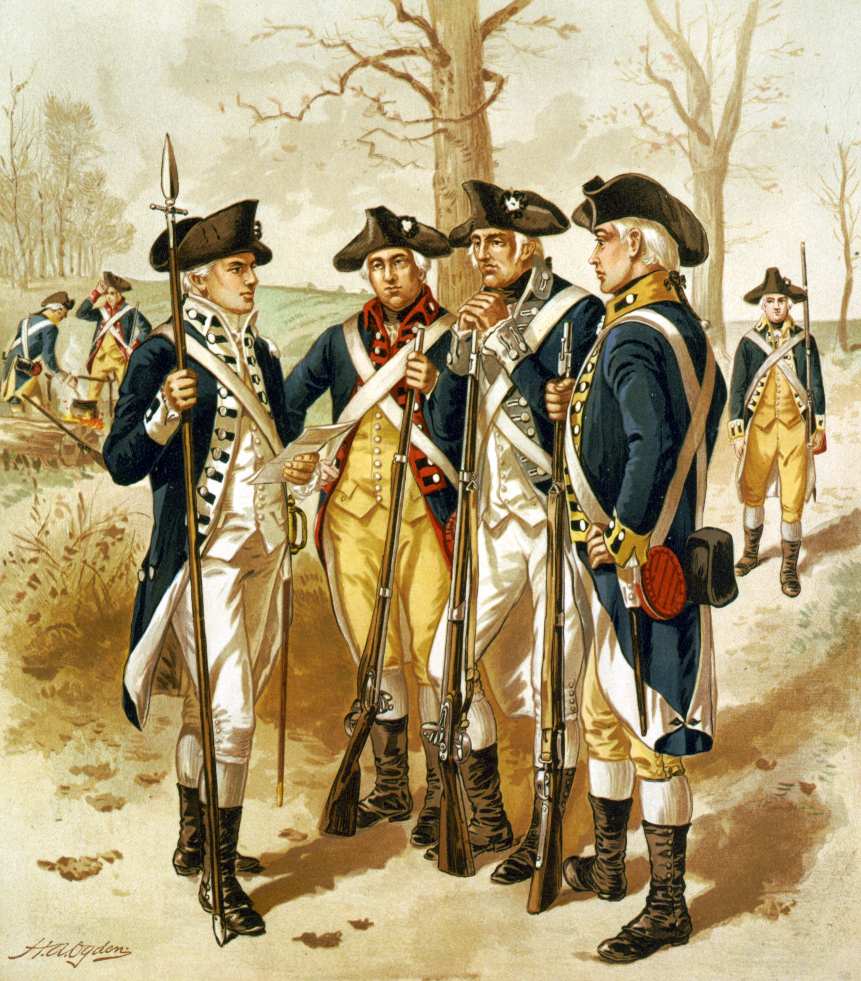
Continental Army uniforms: "The Buff and Blue"

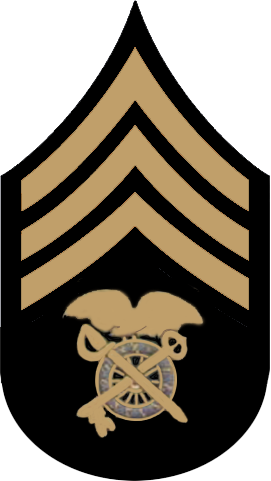
US chevrons—quartermaster sergeant insignia (1902–1909): buff on black with blue detail.

USAIH illustration which specifies "a buff colored vertical rectangular embroidered item"

=== US universities, fraternities and schools ===
The colours of George Washington University and Hamilton College are buff and blue, modelled on the military uniform of General George Washington and the Continental Army. Both General Washington and Alexander Hamilton, as chief of staff, had a role in the design of the uniforms.

Other school colours described as "buff and blue" include Gallaudet University in Washington, D.C., and Punahou School in Honolulu, Hawaii.

Buff is one of three colours of the Alpha Gamma Delta fraternity, and one of two colours of the Delta Chi fraternity.

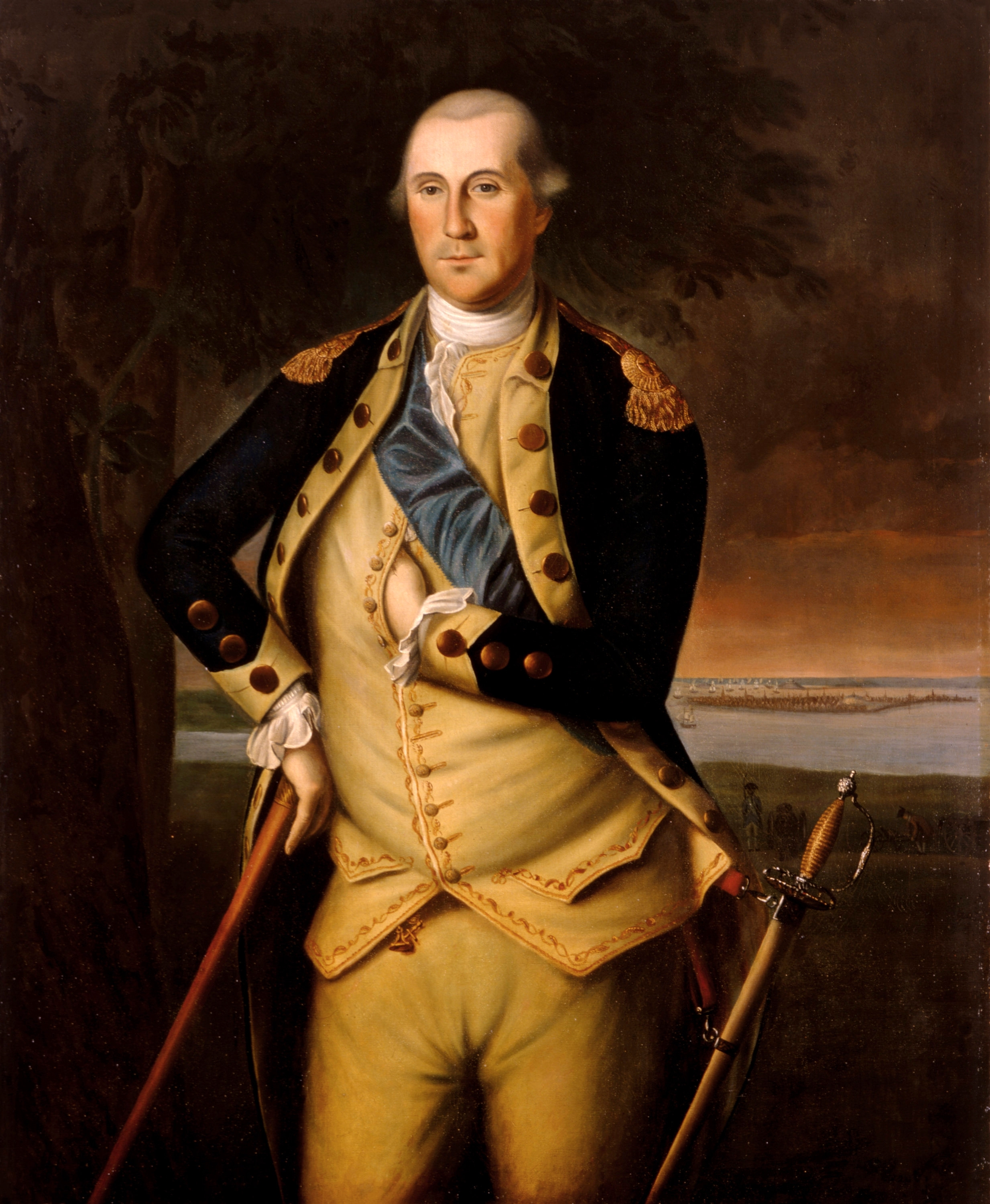
General Washington wearing the buff and blue

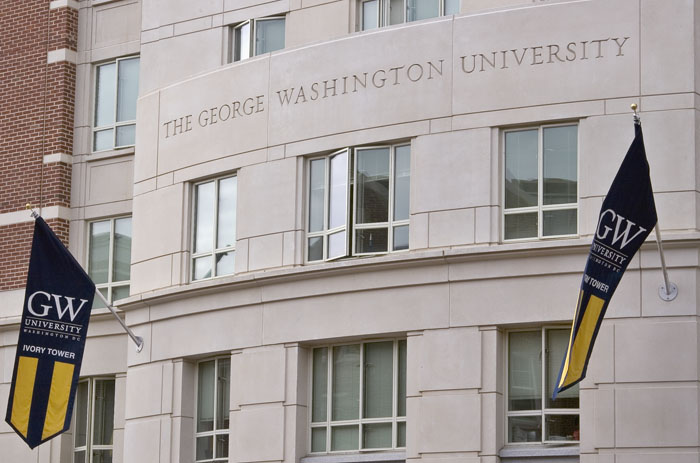
George Washington University banners featuring the buff and blue

The buff and blue logo of the George Washington Revolutionaries

=== US state flags ===
The flags of Delaware, New Jersey and Indiana, and the former flags of New York and Maine, officially feature buff.

The flag of Delaware has "a background of colonial blue surrounding a diamond of buff"

The flag of New Jersey has "the State seal ... in Jersey blue on a buff background"

The flag of Indiana has "nineteen stars and a flaming torch in gold or buff."

Former flag of New York (1896–1901)

Former flag of Maine (1901–1909)

=== Other flags ===
Flag of the Royal Saudi Land Forces

Flag of the former Sudanese province of Kordofan

=== Political usage ===
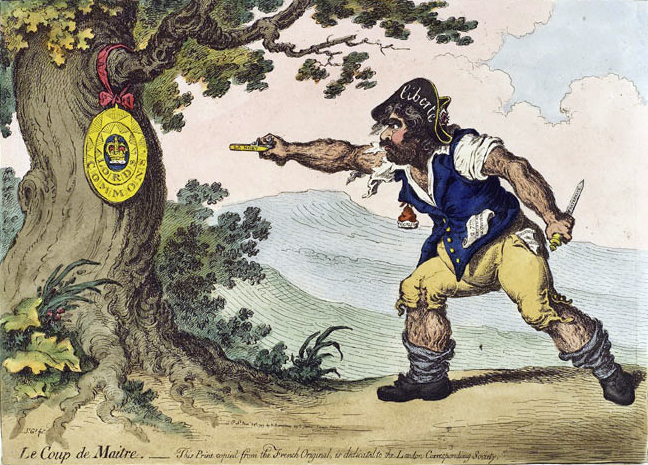
Depiction of the Whig Charles James Fox wearing buff and blue

The colours of the Whig Party, a British political faction, and later political party, as well as the American Whig Party, were buff and blue.

=== White Star buff ===
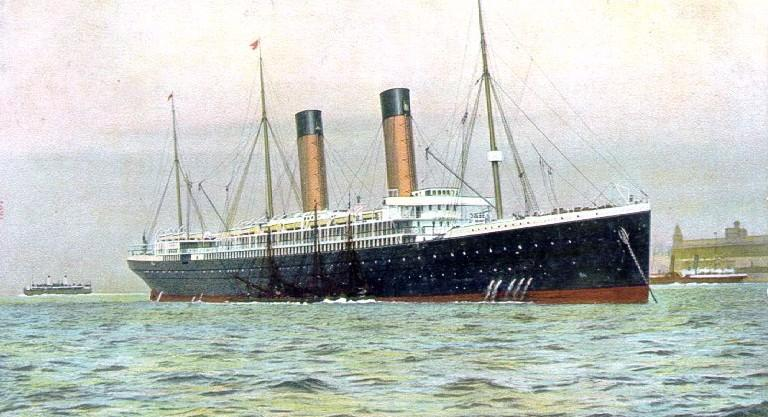
Ships of the White Star Line, such as the RMS Oceanic pictured here, and the Titanic, had buff funnels with black tops.

The funnels of the RMS Titanic and all other ships of the White Star Line were designated to be "buff with a black top" in order to indicate their ownership. There is some uncertainty among experts, however, as to the exact shade of what is now called "White Star buff". There is no surviving paint or formula, and although there are many painted postcards and at least seven colour photographs of White Star liners, the shades of the funnels in these varies due to many factors including the conditions under which they were originally made and the ageing of the pigments in which they were printed. Speaking mostly to scale modellers, the Titanic Research and Modelling Association currently recommend a colour "in the range of the Marschall color", meaning the colour in illustrations in a particular book.

As a relatively inexpensive and readily available paint colour, and one which went well alongside the near-universal black hull and white superstructure used on steamships at the time, White Star was far from the only shipping line to use a shade of buff as a funnel colour. The Orient Line and Norddeutscher Lloyd used an entirely buff funnel without the black top, while Canadian Pacific and the Swedish American Line employed a buff funnel with a representation of the company's house flag on them. The Bibby Line and the Fyffes Line are two of several firms to use the same "buff with a black top" scheme as White Star, but with a similar lack of certainty as to the exact shade used and how this differed from the famous White Star scheme.

=== In Canadian heraldry ===
As well as being a colour used by the United States Army Institute of Heraldry, buff is also recognised as a tincture by the Canadian Heraldic Authority. It appears on the heraldic badge and flag of the Correctional Service of Canada.

== See also ==
- List of colours
- Beige, a similar colour
- Fallow
- Tan, a slightly darker, redder colour
- Tawny
