= Buff coat =

Type of thick leather coat

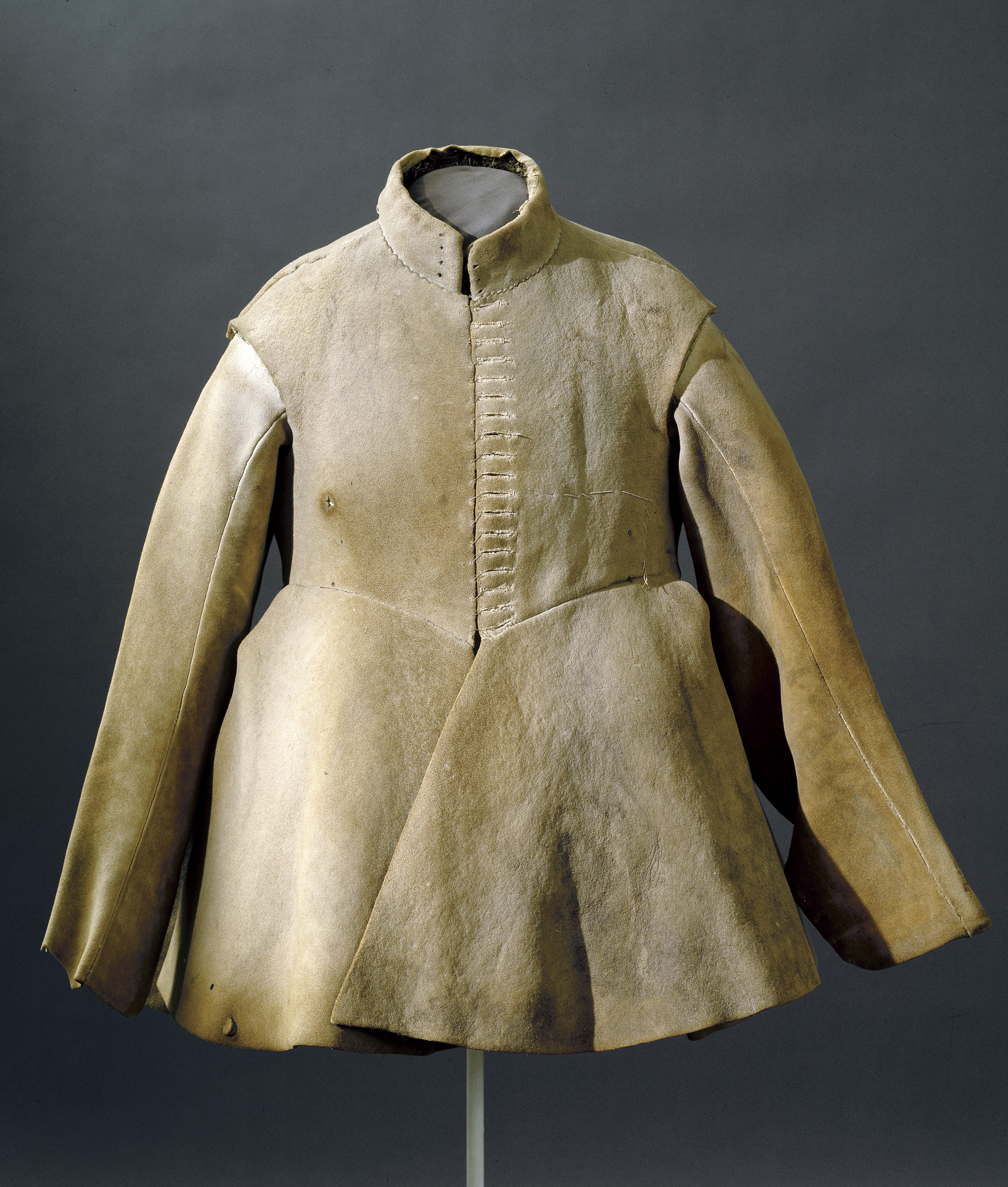
Sleeved buff coat once belonging to King Gustavus Adolphus of Sweden. A bullet-hole is visible in the lower right of the torso section (left to the viewer)

The European buff coat is an item of leather clothing that was primarily worn by cavalry and officers during the 17th century, but also worn by a small number of infantry. It was often worn under iron or steel armour for the torso (breastplate and backplate). The buff coat was derived from the simple leather jerkins employed by huntsmen and soldiers during the Tudor period, these in turn deriving from the arming doublet. The name of the jacket, as well as its characteristic tan or buff colour, derives from the buffalo or ox hide from which it was commonly made.

== Production, appearance and variation ==
The buff coat was worn as European military attire from around 1600 through to the 1680s. The origin of the term 'buff' in relation to the coat refers to leather obtained from the "European buffalo" (available sources do not specify what species this term means, but it most probably refers to the wisent), which also gave rise to the term buff for its light tan colour. The only source of buffalo leather in the early 17th century was Germany. Most buff coats, however, were made from thick cowhide. While mainly worn for military use, its design reflects civilian styles fashionable during the early 17th century, with a high waist and flared skirts extending to the thighs. It is related to the earlier sleeveless doublet or jerkin, likewise made of thick leather.

Made in sleeveless and sleeved variants, the very finest buff coats were made of the hide of the European elk. Buff leather was produced by a method of "oil tanning"; following treatment with lime the hide was scraped to remove the outer layer, which gave the finished product a matt surface. The hide then had cod oil worked into it in a process called "kicking" and was finally air-dried. The oiling and drying steps could be repeated. The finished leather attained its characteristic buff colour and was supple, durable and weather resistant.

Due to the thickness of the leather, the seams of these coats were all butt-jointed, with hidden or partially hidden stitches. Thread holes were punched with an awl before stitching, since needles then in use could not puncture the hide. Extant examples are lined, either with coarse linen or silk. Closures included laces threaded through eyelets, buttons, loops, and clasps. All extant English examples are closed with hooks and eyes. Many high quality examples show apparent fastenings of gold or silver tape at the front, however, these were merely decorative, the real fastenings being hidden hooks and eyes attached to the inside of the join. Some of the highest quality buff coats, typically shown in portraits of officers, had multiple stripes of gold or silver lace running lengthwise down, or hooped around, the sleeves.

Most surviving examples have sleeves, but a minority are sleeveless. Removable sleeves were common for men's clothing in the 17th century. Sleeves could be of a single thickness of leather from shoulder to wrist, or alternatively of a double thickness from the shoulder to the elbow, with a single thickness, to allow freedom of movement, to the wrist. All buff coats had deep skirts attached, which protected the upper legs of the wearer. The thickest parts of the leather were generally placed so as to protect the wearer's legs while on horseback. The extant collection of buff coats preserved at Littlecote House dating to 1649–1660, contains examples with leather varying from 0.06 to 0.22 inches (1.5 to 5.6 mm) in thickness and entire coats weighing between 4 lb 4 oz and 7 lb 8 oz (1.9–3.4 kg).

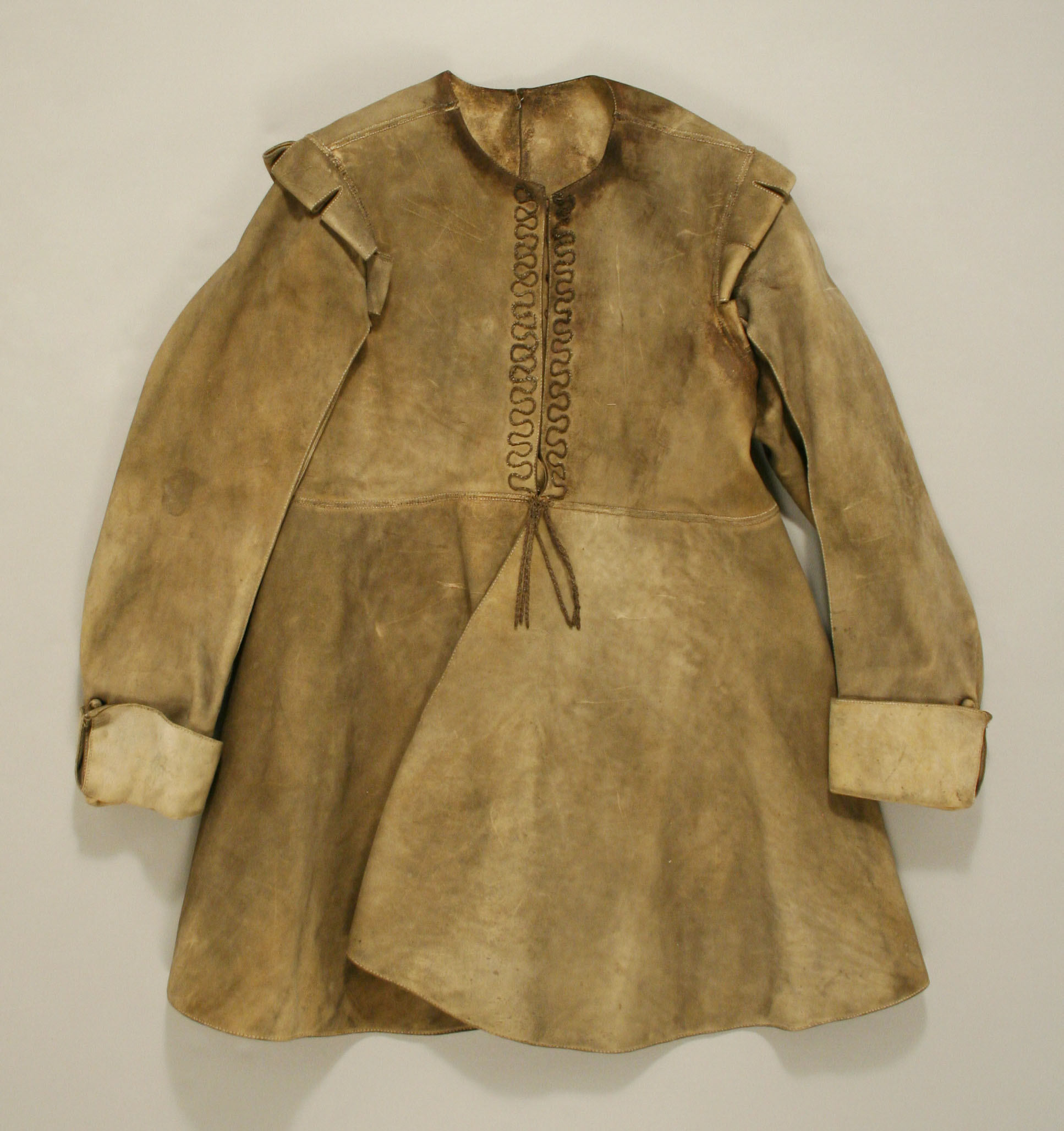
English buff coat 1630–1640 showing false fastening of silver tape down the front. Metropolitan Museum of Art

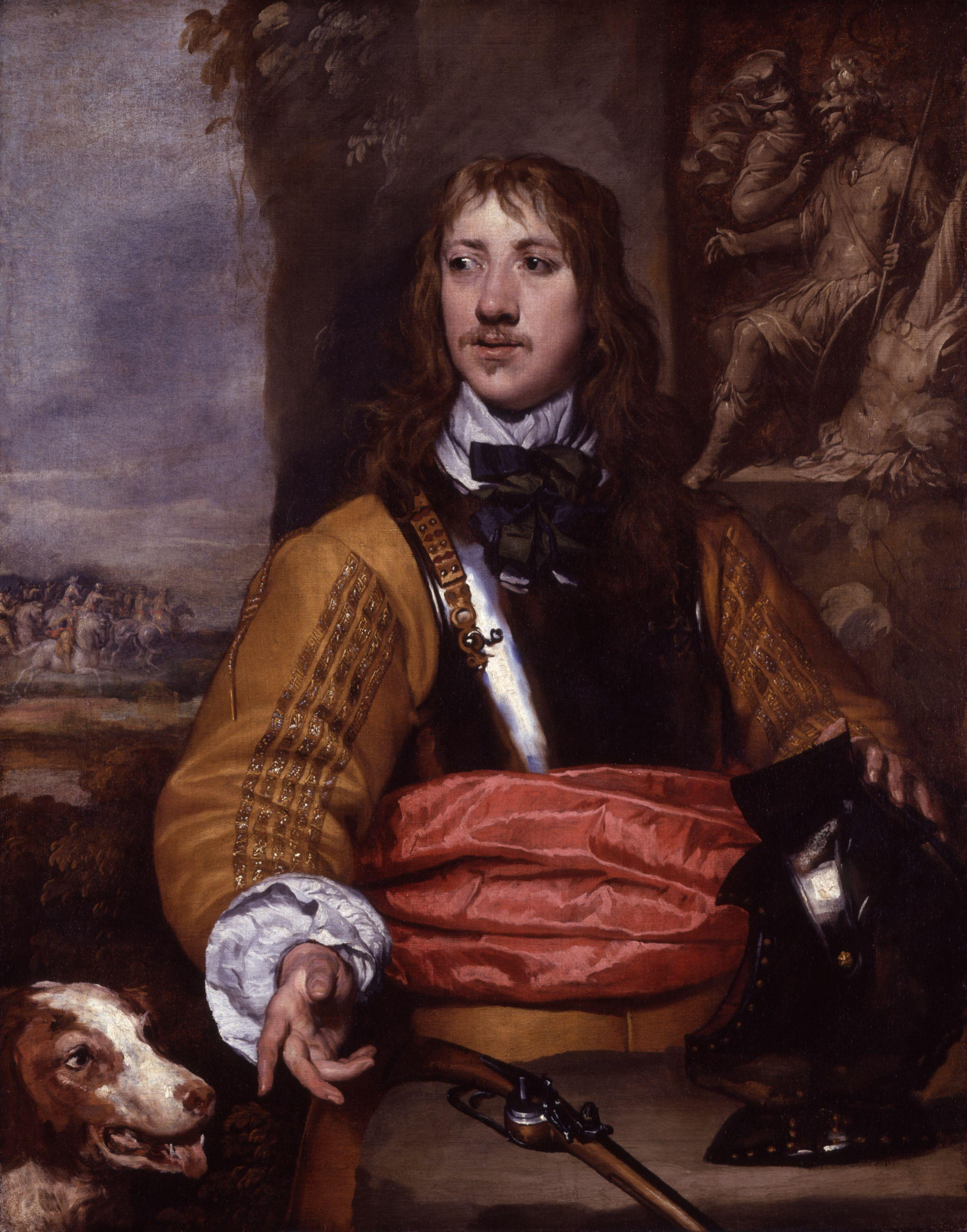
A Royalist cavalry officer of the English Civil War, wearing a buff coat under a cuirass. The buff coat has sleeves decorated with bands of gold lace. Portrait of Richard Neville, by William Dobson, 17th century

== Use ==
The coat provided some protection against cuts by swords and other edged weapons; however the buff coat was ineffective against thrusts; it was also ineffective as a protection from firearms, possibly excepting spent bullets. The buff coat was often worn under the plate armour cuirass, where it helped to cushion the wearer from chafing or bruising by the armour's edges. It was also worn on its own, as the buff coat was much more comfortable to wear for long periods of time than the cuirass. The finest quality buff coats were expensive, often much more so than the munition armour cuirasses typically issued to common soldiers, which may account for their widespread association with officers and other men of greater than average wealth.

The buff coat was used extensively during the Thirty Years' War and the English Civil War. Together with the lobster-tailed pot helmet and cuirass it formed the basis of the equipment of the harquebusier, the typical form of European cavalryman of the 17th century. Although worn by some foot soldiers, in battle it was mainly restricted to use by affluent cavalry troops. Buff coats were issued to a minority of musketeers in the pike and shot formations to give them some protection during hand-to-hand combat. The buff coat was also worn by civilians requiring a protective and durable garment, such as huntsmen and men travelling on horseback.

== See also ==
- Gambeson, a padded jacket, worn singly as armor or combined with mail or plate armor

== Cited works ==
- Blackmore, D. (1990). Arms & Armour of the English Civil Wars. R. Hook, illustrator. Trustees of the Royal Armouries. ISBN 0-948092-08-4.
- Brzezinski, R. (1993). The Army of Gustavus Adolphus (2) Cavalry. Osprey Publishing. ISBN 1-85532-350-8.
- Doering, Mary D. (2016). "Buff Coats, 1600–1714". In F., José Blanco; Doering, Mary (eds.). Clothing and Fashion: American Fashion from Head to Toe, Volume 1. ABC-CLIO. pp. 42–43. ISBN 978-1-61069-310-3.
- Dowen, Keith (March 2015). "The Seventeenth Century Buff Coat". Journal of the Arms and Armour Society. XXI (5): 157–188. ISSN 0004-2439.
- Haythornthwaite, P (1983). The English Civil War, 1642–1651: An Illustrated Military History. Blandford Press. ISBN 1-85409-323-1.
- Nolan, Cathal J. (2006). The Age of Wars of Religion, 1000-1650: An Encyclopedia of Global Warfare and Civilization, Volume 1. Greenwood Press. p. 97. ISBN 978-0-313-33733-8.
- Tincey, J. (1990). Soldiers of the English Civil War (2) Cavalry. A. McBride, illustrator. Osprey Publishing. ISBN 0-85045-940-0.
- Tincey, J. (2002). Ironsides: English Cavalry, 1588–1688. G. Turner, illustrator. Osprey Publishing. ISBN 1-84176-213-X.
