= Buff leather =

Strong and soft type of leather

Buff leather is a strong, soft preparation of bull's or elk's hide, used in the Middle Ages onwards, that bore a rudimentary ability to deaden the effect of a blow. As armor fell into disuse at the widespread arrival of firearms to the battlefield in the 16th century, buff coats, which could in some situations survive a broadsword cut, and very rarely a pistol ball, came into use more frequently. These were often worn in lieu of complete steel, either with or without a cuirass and gorget of metal.

Modern buff leather, of which soldiers' cross belts and other accoutrements are frequently made, is for the most part made of common buckskin.
