= Harquebusier =

Historical form of cavalry

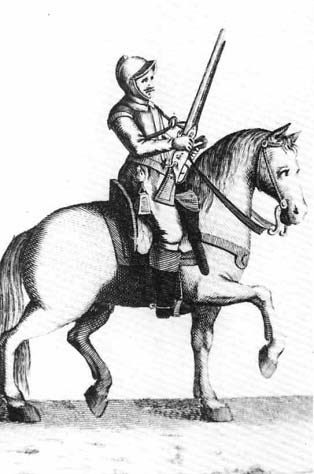
Harquebusier, carbine-armed cavalry, 17th century

The harquebusier was the most common form of cavalry found throughout Western Europe during the early to mid-17th century. Early harquebusiers were characterised by the use of a type of carbine called a "harquebus", related to the arquebus. In England, harquebusier was the technical name for this type of cavalry, though in everyday usage they were usually simply called 'cavalry' or 'horse'. In Germany they were often termed Ringerpferd, or sometimes Reiter, in Sweden they were called lätta ryttare.

== Development ==
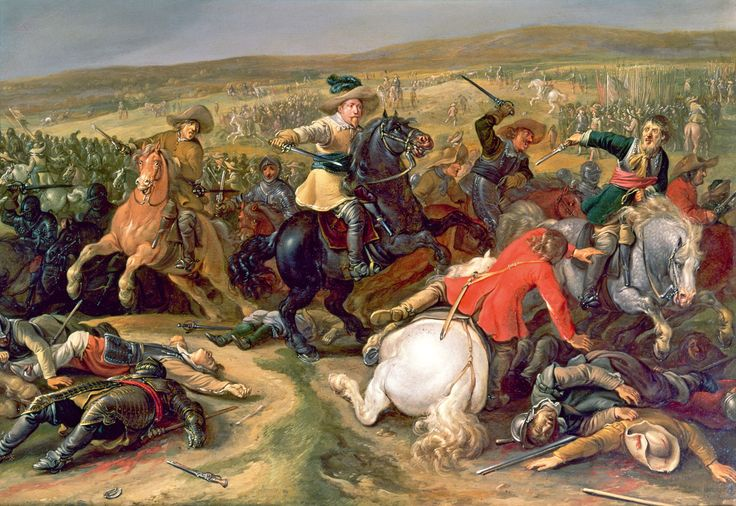
Gustavus Adolphus (centre) leading a mixed-cavalry charge, c. 1632. Painting by Jan Martszen de Jonge, 1634

Mounted arquebusiers were recorded as being in use in Italy in 1494, where they were employed by Ludovico Sforza, although it was Camillo Vitelli who popularized in 1496 in Lucera by mixing them with caracole maneuvers. They were developed further after 1524 by Giovanni delle Bande Nere and Fernando d'Ávalos, who made a wide usage of them by 1524. According to John Cruso in his cavalry manual of 1632, the harquebusier was 'first invented in France'. This type of cavalryman was characterised by the use of a form of carbine. The earliest type of carbine used was called a "harquebus" (a word derived from the heavier infantry weapon, the arquebus). In the late 16th century and into the first decades of the following century the harquebusier was envisioned, like the similar and earlier petronel, as a support for more heavily-armoured cavalrymen such as the demi-lancer, or pistol-armed cavalry – the cuirassier and reiter.

Towards the mid-17th century, the harquebusier became the standard type of cavalry found throughout western Europe. The change in the role of the harquebusier from support cavalry primarily reliant on firearms to one of shock-capable close-combat cavalry can be attributed to Gustavus Adolphus of Sweden in the 1620s and 1630s. This change was initially made from necessity; Sweden was a relatively poor nation and could not afford to equip many expensive cuirassiers, therefore more lightly-equipped cavalry had to be employed in the shock role. The success of Swedish cavalry in battle during the Thirty Years War led to other nations adopting their methods. Gustavus Adolphus also reduced the depth of a cavalry formation from the previous six to ten ranks for pistol-based tactics, to three ranks to suit his sword-based shock tactics.

The later harquebusier was also used in a shock role by cavalry leaders of the English Civil War, such as Prince Rupert of the Rhine and Oliver Cromwell. They employed harquesbusiers very aggressively, charging with sword in hand, thus relegating their firearms to a secondary function. Indeed by the 1620s cavalry not equipped with carbines could be termed "harquebusiers", just from the level and style of their armour protection. By the time of the English Civil War all cavalry not equipped as cuirassiers or carrying a lance (the Scots fielded light lancers as late as the 1650s) were called harquebusiers. In the course of the war the cuirassier ceased to be fielded in Britain, and when the cuirassier discarded his limb armour he instantly became indistinguishable from the harquebusier.

== Equipment ==
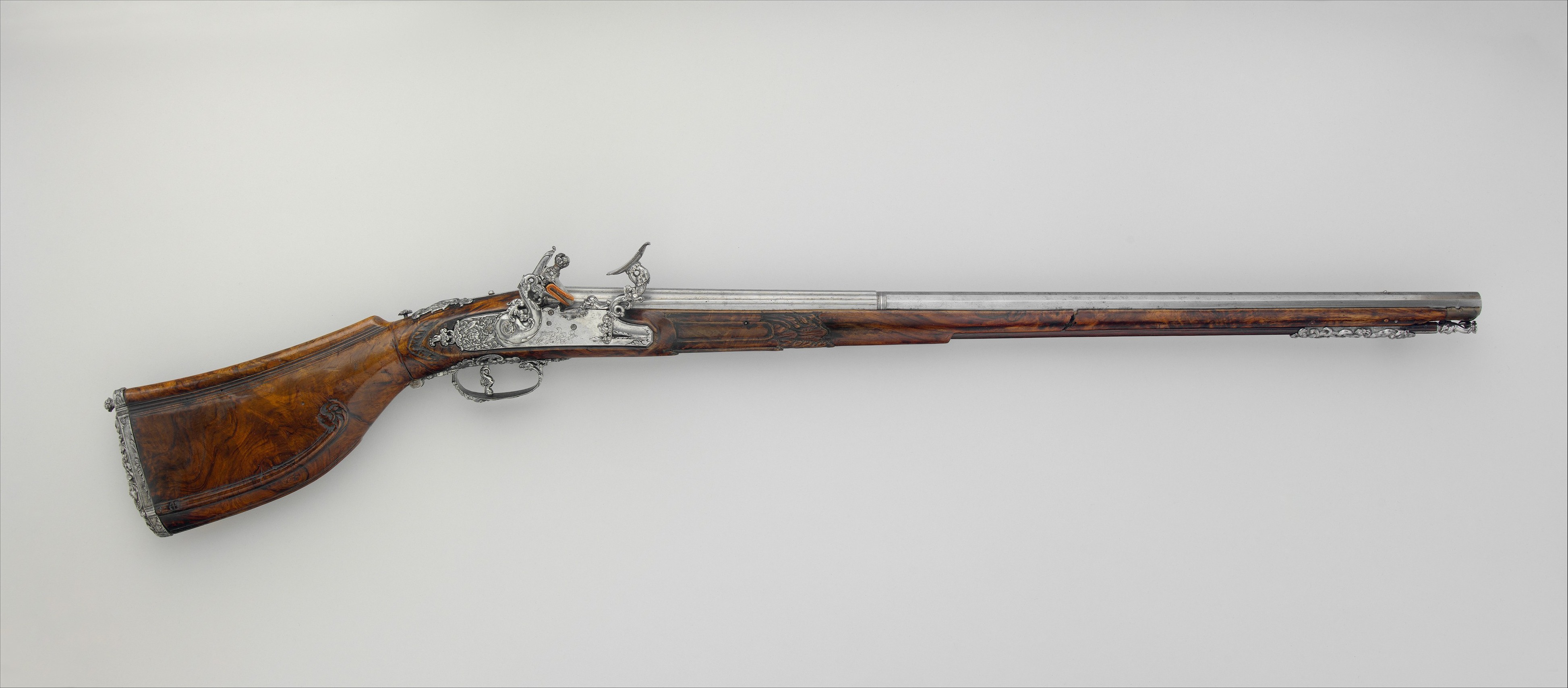
Snaphaunce carbine, c. 1660s

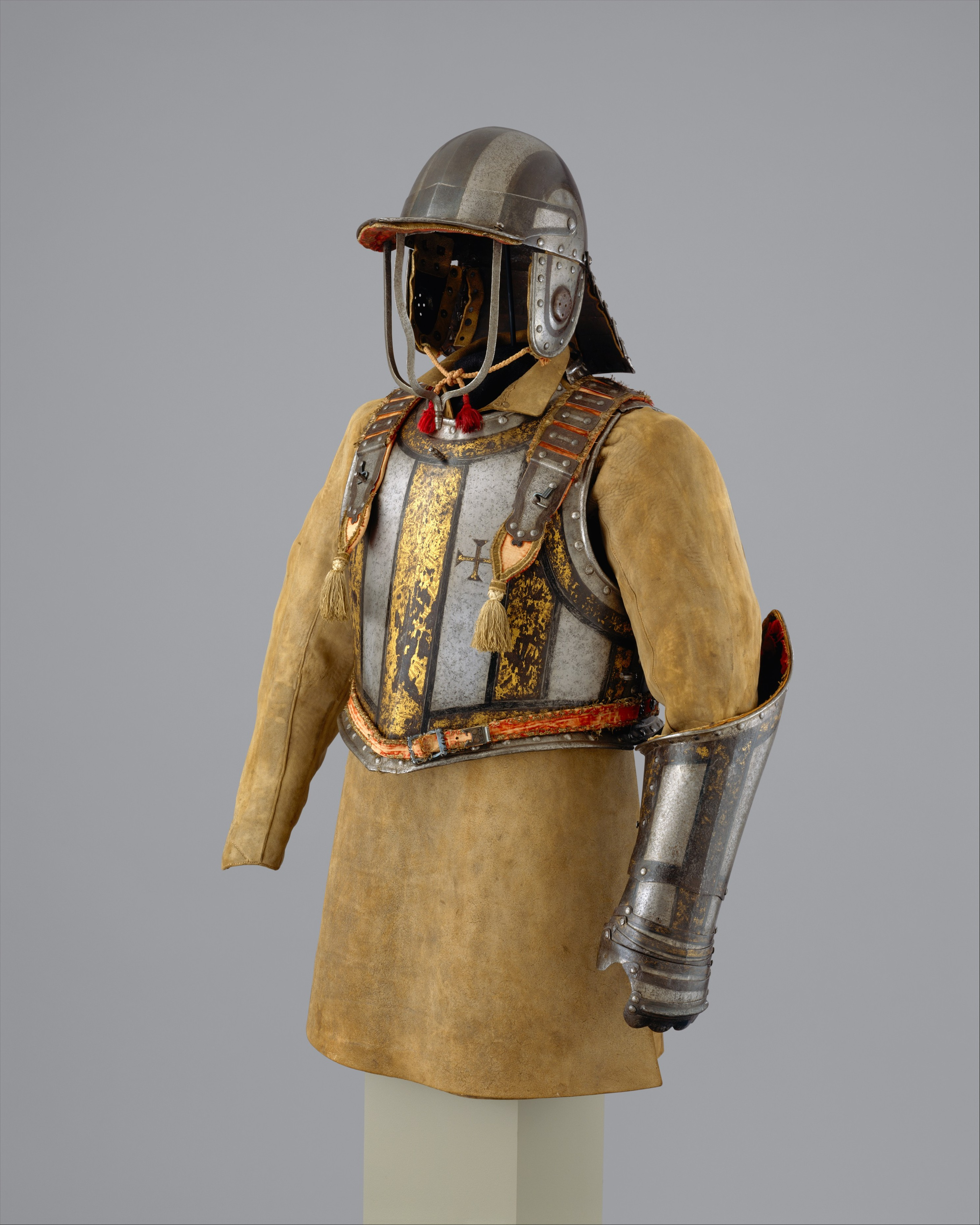
English-made very high quality harquebusier armour of Pedro II of Portugal: an engraved cuirass, bridle-hand gauntlet, buff coat, and 3-barred lobster tailed pot helmet

The harquebusier would usually be armed with a wheellock, snaphaunce or doglock flintlock carbine hung from a swivel attached to a baldric, pistols in saddle holsters, and a stout, straight-bladed sword. The 'dog' of the doglock was a type of safety-catch used to prevent the unintentional firing of the carbine when on horseback. Records also indicate that some harquebusiers were also armed with a horseman's poleaxe or pick, which were hafted weapons with axe or hammer heads and armour-piercing spikes.

The typical harquebusier would have an iron cuirass with a breast and backplate, and an open-faced helmet such as a lobster-tailed pot; the fashion-conscious could replace the helmet with a broad-brimmed felt hat, often worn over a concealed iron skullcap or secrete. In England, in 1629, a harquebusier's armour cost one pound and six shillings, that of a cuirassier four pounds and ten shillings. A more wealthy harquebusier may have worn a buff coat (the finest quality buff coats were often more expensive than an iron cuirass) under his armour and a metal gauntlet to protect his bridle hand and forearm. Also worn were tall, cuff-topped riding boots; these reached the thigh and were often also of buff leather. Munition-quality (mass-produced) armour at this time was usually of iron, sometimes containing small amounts of phosphorus; this addition gave a minimal increase in hardness. Officers and other wealthy men would have had access to steel armour, which was carefully heat-treated to harden it.

== Organisation ==
Harquebusiers were organised into troops, and a variable number of troops made up a regiment. The organisation of the cavalry of the New Model Army in England was typical: each troop was ideally composed of 100 cavalrymen commanded by a captain, with six troops comprising a regiment under a colonel. Regiments were usually named after their colonel, and both the colonel and his second-in-command, the major or sergeant major, personally led his own troop. When the regimental colonel was also a general or had other duties, a 'stand-in' termed a lieutenant-colonel was appointed. Numbers of cavalrymen per troop were often lower than the ideal when on campaign and some regiments had more troops than was normal. Prominent commanders also often had a 'lifeguard'; Prince Rupert had a ten-troop regiment plus a lifeguard of 150 men, whilst Oliver Cromwell's regiment had fourteen troops.

== Tactics ==
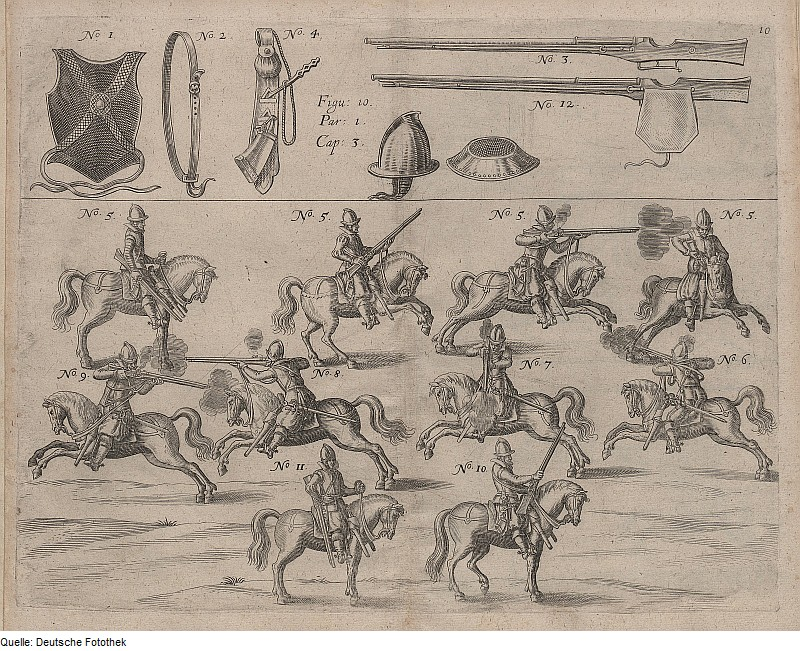
German drill manual for early 17th century harquebusiers (Johann Jacobi von Wallhausen, Kriegskunst zu Pferdt)

There were national variations in the battlefield employment of harquebusiers. The French tended to retain greater use of firearms, with their harquebusiers often giving a volley of carbine or pistol fire before closing with the sword. The Swedish and Royalist English horse charged home directly with the sword, not using firearms until the melee. The Parliamentarian English cavalry retained the use of firearms in the charge until later in the Civil War, but by the time of the New Model Army had largely adopted the direct charge with the sword. The Royalists, under Prince Rupert's direction, began the Civil War using the Swedish three ranks-deep formation but the Parliamentarians retained a six-deep formation until late 1643 or early 1644. A cavalry unit drawn up in a shallow formation would outflank a similar-sized unit arrayed in a deep formation, a considerable tactical advantage. The Swedes and Royalist horse usually charged at speed, while the Parliamentarian Ironsides charged at a slower pace, the troopers keeping together knee-to-knee to retain their formation.

In England many harquebusiers did not employ a carbine, as is described in Militaire Discipline of 1661:

Many troops and regiments only with sword and pistol armed, their encounterings being not after the ancient manner of firing at a distance and wheeling off, which hath been found to be of dangerous consequence, but to fire at near distance their swords hanging at their wrists by a string, and with their sword points charging through adverse troops.

== Demise ==
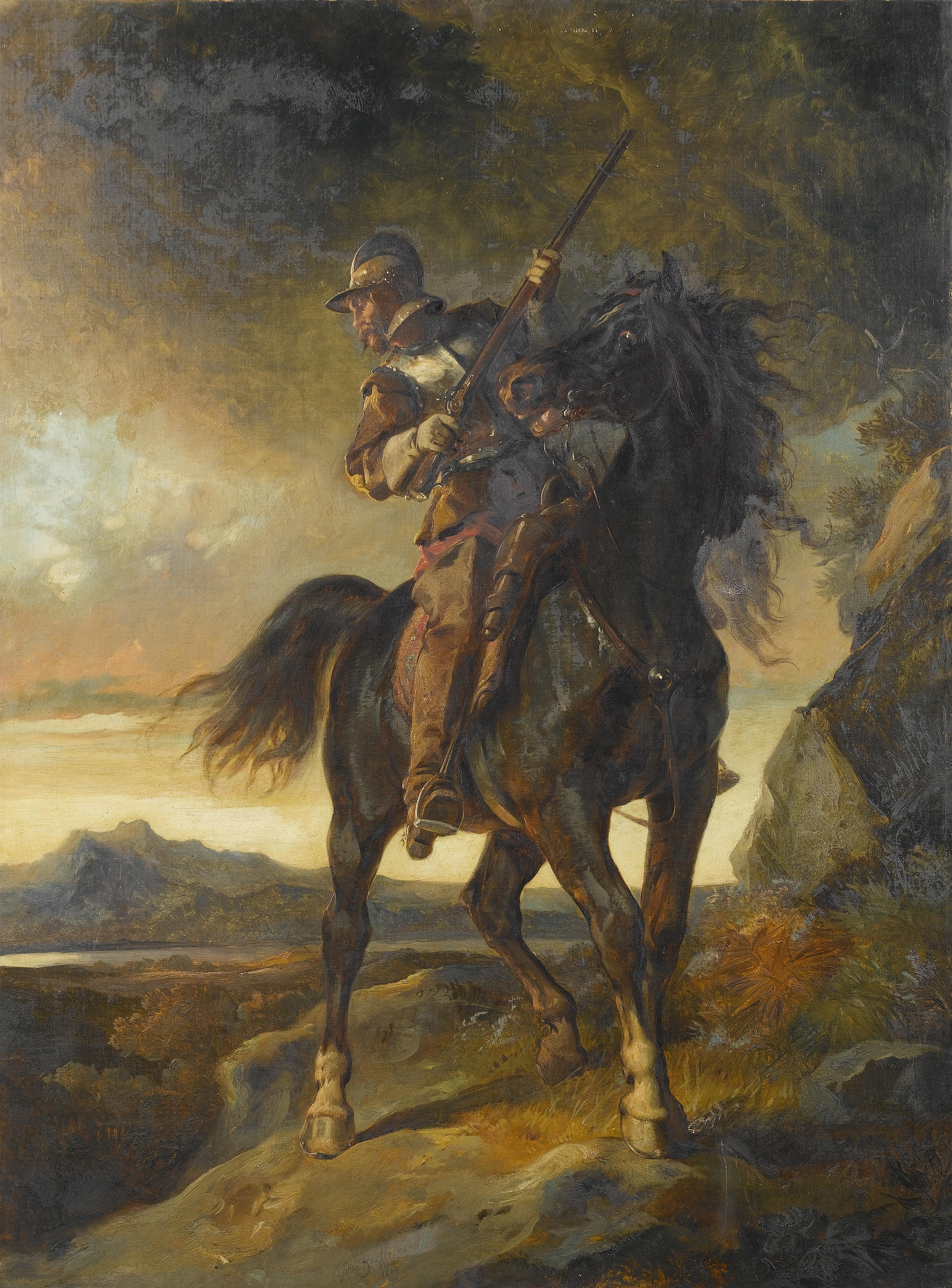
Victorian painting of a harquebusier. The image is intended to show a soldier of the late 17th century, though the equipment is more typical of early 17th: a wheelock carbine, a cuirass over a buff coat, and an old-fashioned burgonet helmet.

The term harquebusier fell out of use gradually, as armour use declined and the fully-armoured cuirassier disappeared. Harquebusiers became part of the undifferentiated "horse" or, in French, "cavalerie", of the early to mid-18th century. In the British army many cavalry regiments having their origins as units of harquebusiers eventually transformed into dragoons. In the last two decades of the 17th century, the use of armour and the buff coat declined and helmets were definitively replaced by felt hats and uniform coats. As an example, all items of armour previously employed by the regiment of Oxford Blues (precursor of the Royal Horse Guards) were ordered to be put in store in 1688 before the regiment went on active service.

The equipment of the harquebusier disappeared at different rates; the doglock carbine was replaced by the 'true' flintlock in the late 17th century. Cuirasses fell in and out of fashion during the 18th century, before the Napoleonic renaissance of the later type of cuirassier in the first decade of the 19th century. The lobster-tailed pot helmet fell out of favour in most countries by 1700, though the Austrian army retained this type of helmet for its cuirassiers into the 1780s, especially when campaigning against the Ottoman Turks.

== See also ==
- Dragoon
- Petronel
- Carabinier
