= Petronel =

Type of muzzleloading firearm

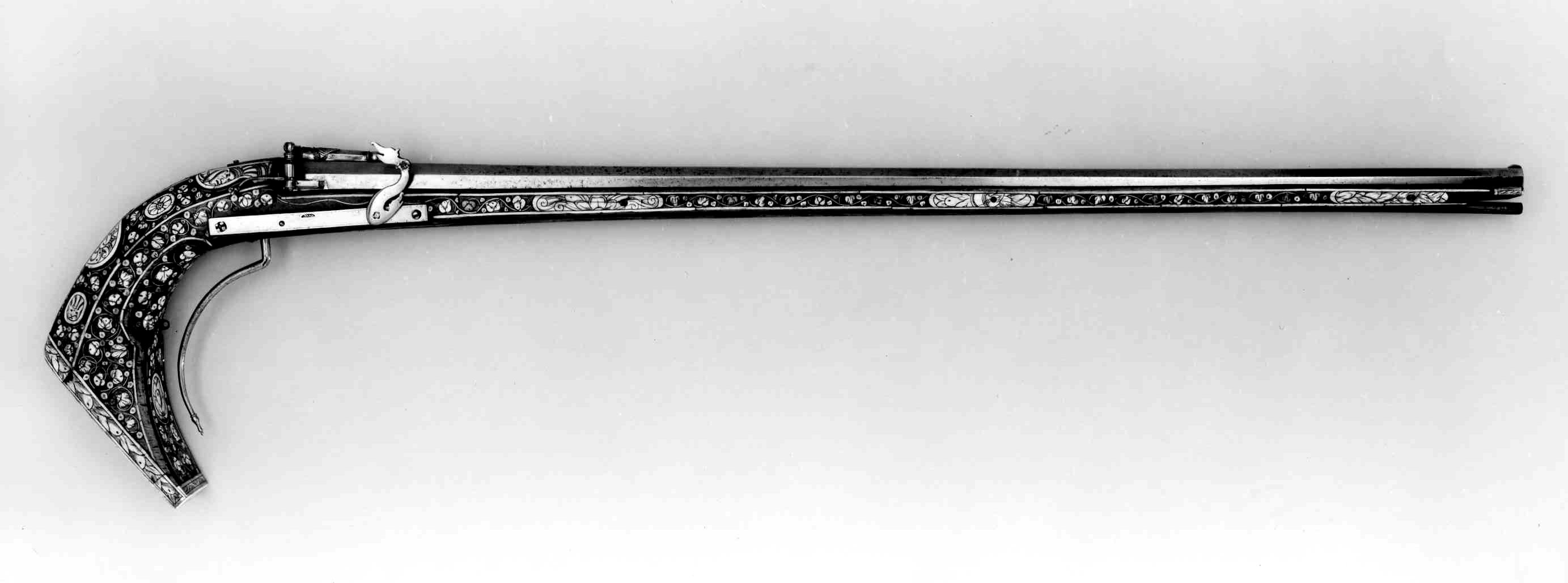
A French petronel made in c. 1570

The petronel is a type of muzzleloading firearm, defined by Robert Barret (Theorike and Practike of Modern Warres, 1598) as a "horsemans peece". Originating in the 16th century was the muzzle-loading firearm, which developed on the one hand into the pistol and on the other into the carbine. The name (French petrinel or poitrinal) was given to the weapon either because it was fired with the butt resting against the chest (French: poitrine, Latin: pectus) or it was carried slung from a belt across the chest. Petronels may have either matchlock or wheellock mechanisms.

The sclopus was the prototype of the petronel. The petronel is a compromise between the harquebus and the pistol. Early petronels, with a crude buttstock, date back to the end of the 14th century. Generally, the touch hole is on the right side, and fired by a separate slow match. Sometimes, petronels had small hinged plate-covers to protect the priming from moisture. By extension, the term "petronel" came to characterise the type of light cavalry that employed the firearm. The petronel (cavalryman) was used to support the heavy cavalry, such as demi-lancers and cuirassiers. The petronel was succeeded by a similarly armed cavalryman called the harquebusier.

== Later developments ==
Although petronels had fallen out of use in Europe by 1700, similar guns were made in the Middle East until the late 19th century. Afghan horsemen used a gun that was midway between an oversized pistol or a miniature carbine, with a curved buttstock designed to keep the weapon close to the rider's chest.

== Gallery ==
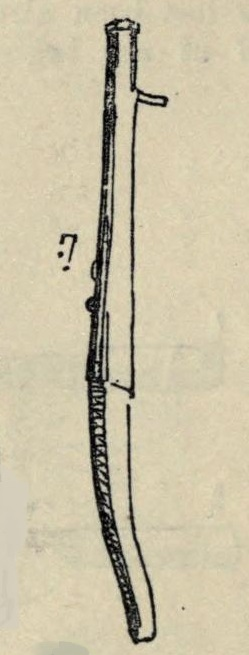
Petronel of the end of the 15th century.

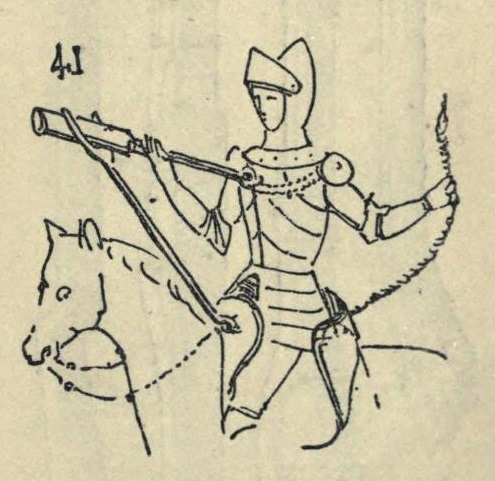
Early petronel, from a manuscript in the ancient library of Burgundy, by Glockenthon, of the arms of the Emperor Maximilian I (1505).

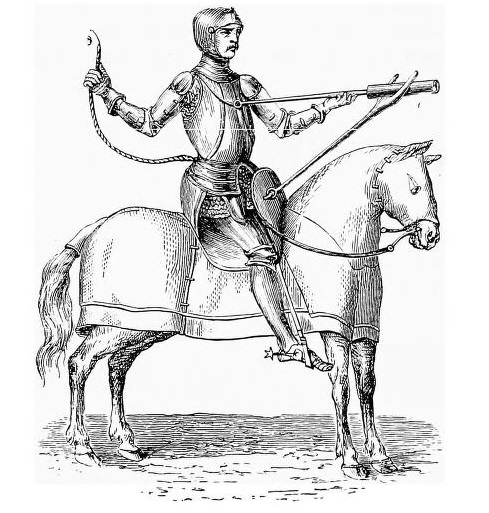
Cavalier Firing Petronel (After Marianus Jacobus).

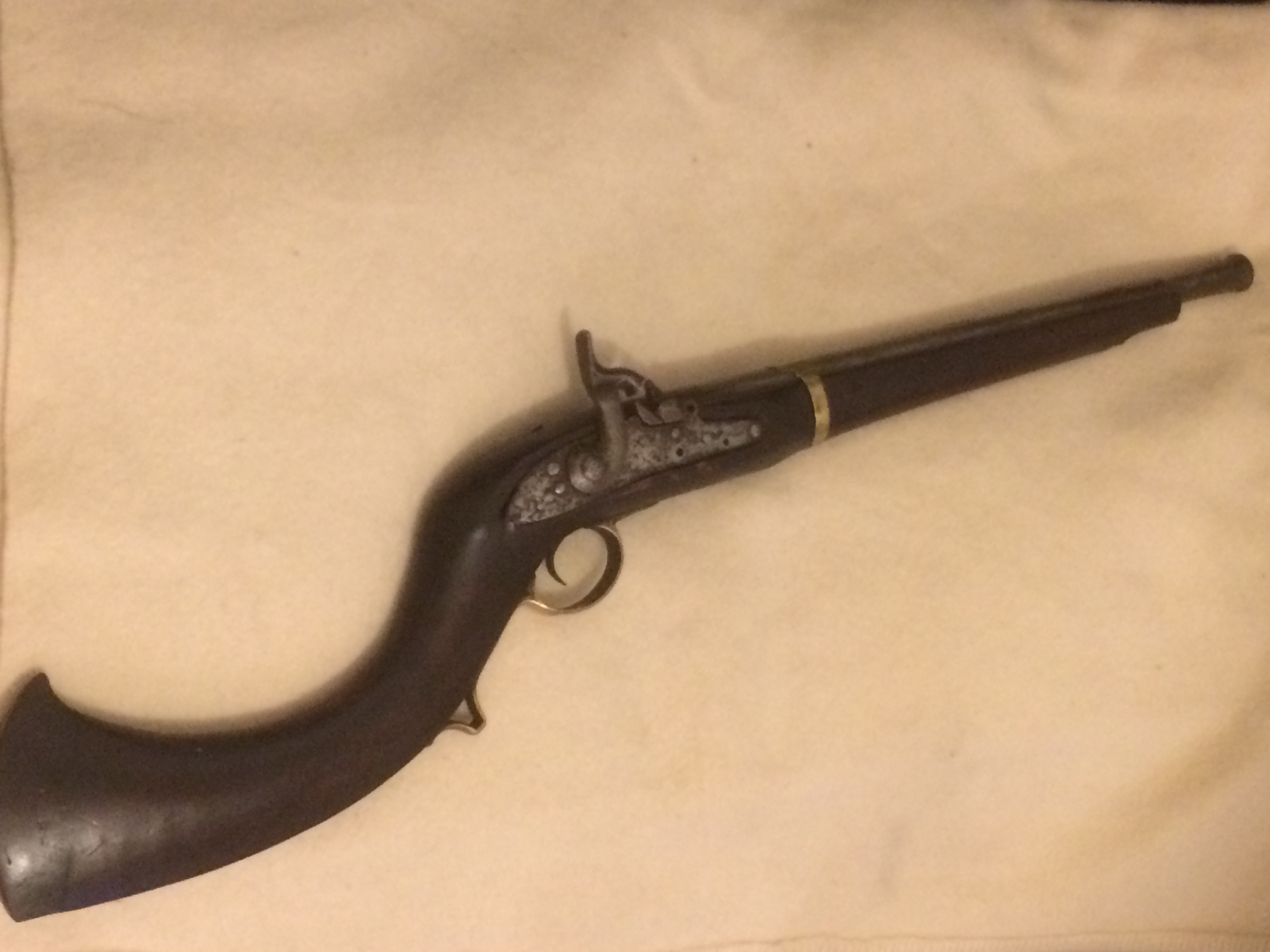
Short barreled Afghan jezail from the early to mid 1800s.

== See also ==
- Moukahla, North African musket
- Jezail, Afghan musket
- Musketoon, weapon with shorter barrel than a musket
- Carbine
