= Musketoon =

Short version of a musket

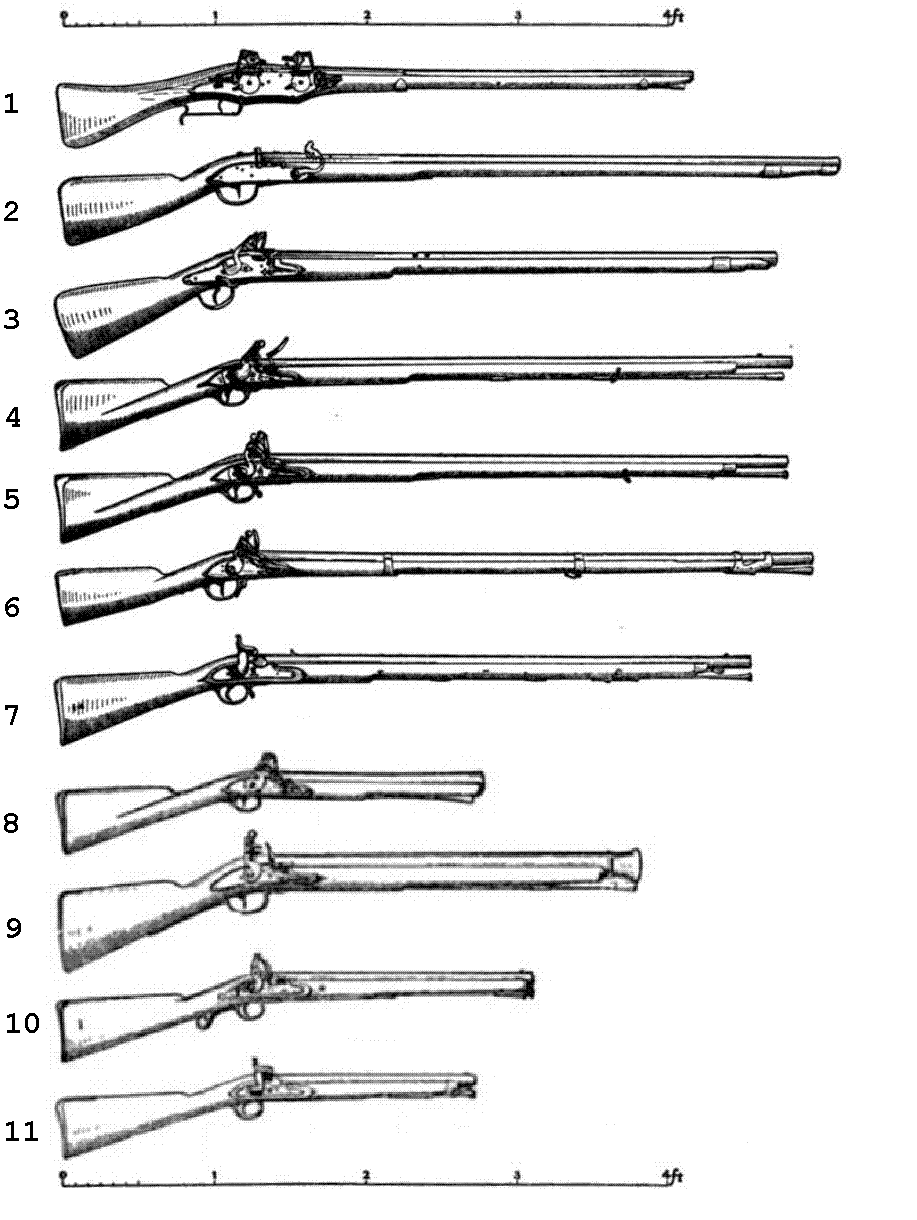
Various muzzle loading arms, to scale; number 10,11 is identified as a musketoon (Encyclopædia Britannica, 1910)

The musketoon is a shorter-barrelled version of the musket and served in the roles of a shotgun or carbine. Musketoons could be of the same caliber as the issue musket or of a much larger caliber, 1.0–2.5 inches (25–63 mm). The musketoon is most commonly associated with naval use, and pirates in particular, though they also served in a carbine role with cavalry. Musketoon barrels were often flared at the muzzle, resembling a cannon or swivel attach blunderbuss.

== Description ==
Musketoons had a brass or iron barrel, and used a wheellock, flintlock or caplock firing mechanism, like the typical musket of the period. They were fired from the shoulder like the musket, but the shorter length (barrels were as short as a foot (30 cm) long) made them easier to handle for those in restricted conditions, such as mounted infantry and naval boarding parties.

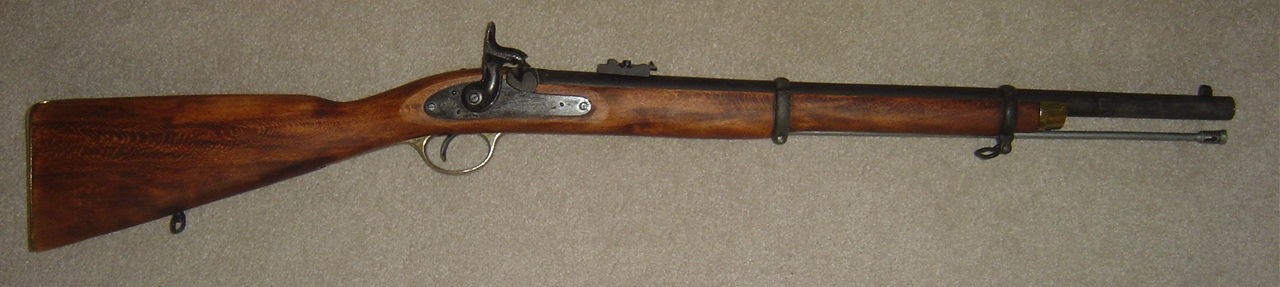
Replica of a Pattern 1861 Enfield musketoon.

Smaller bore musketoons matched the caliber of the muskets in service, and were generally used the same way, with single musket ball or a buck and ball load, while large bore musketoons were loaded with multiple buckshot or pistol balls (generally smaller in diameter than musket balls) and used as shotguns. It is this type of loading that is most associated with naval use. Their resemblance to earlier weapons like the blunderbuss has led to their misidentification in both scholarly and popular media.

== Service ==
The M1786 musketoon was developed as a light cavalry weapon, primarily intended for Hussars and other light cavalry units during the late French Kingdom period.

Due to its smaller size and weight the "Paget carbine" was used through the Napoleonic wars by the British cavalry units. It had a 16 inch smoothbore barrel and could be better wielded from horseback than the standard "Brown Bess" musket or Baker rifle. The British army updated their cavalry carbines in the percussion era, issuing the Enfield pattern of 1858 and the 1861 artillery or cavalry carbines, both with 24 inch rifled barrels. Other European armies also armed their cavalry units with shorter-barreled carbines or musketoons. The Russian musketoon, for example, was part of a family of long arms developed in 1809, all derived from the M1808 Infantry Tula Musket, itself an almost direct copy of the royal French Model 1777 musket. Ironically used against Napoleon's grand army throughout the duration of the war. The .65 caliber was standard for military smoothbore muskets during the Napoleonic era. Throughout the early 19th century, arms manufacturers in Liège, situated in the United Kingdom of the Netherlands, supplied weaponry across Europe. As a result, a significant volume of Belgian-manufactured percussion muskets and musketoons saw extensive service across various military operations following the Napoleonic era.

The P1861 musketoon and Belgian short rifle ("Minié" Clavines) was subsequently adopted by the Argentinian army and Imperial Brazilian cavalry corps during the War of the Triple Alliance.

Musketoons saw service with the US Army on land as the short length musket-caliber Springfield Model 1847 Musketoon. The weapons were issued to antebellum dragoons and Sappers & Miners between the Mexican-American War and the American Civil War and are known to have been used at the Battle of Pine Creek, and by Captain Andrew Jackson Smith's forces near Big Meadows. The CS Army was equipped with domestically made model Richmond unmarked musketoons from Richmond Arsenal.

The Austrian M-1862 Lorenz Artillery Musketoon was a specialized firearm primarily issued to artillery and engineer units for its compactness, enabling ease of handling in confined areas. Many were exported or purchased by agents during the Civil War when both the Union and Confederacy sought additional firearms.

== See also ==
- Arquebus
- Blunderbuss
- Carbine
- Petronel
