= Pattern 1861 Enfield musketoon =

Pattern 1861 Enfield
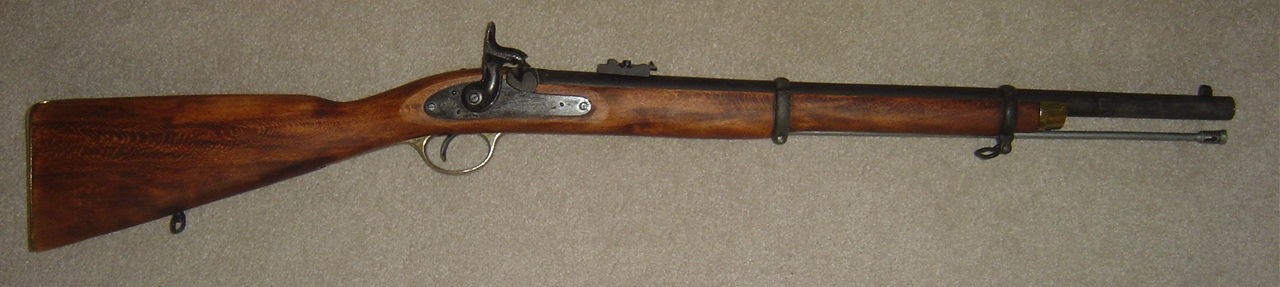
- Replica of a Pattern 1861 Enfield musketoon
- Type: Musketoon
- Place of origin: United Kingdom

Service history
- In service: 1861–1889
- Used by: United Kingdom; United States; Confederate States; Empire of Japan; Argentina; Canada
- Wars: American Civil War, Boshin War, Paraguayan War, Fenian incursion

Production history
- Designed: 1861
- Manufacturer: Royal Small Arms Factory
- Produced: 1861–1864

Specifications
- Barrel length: 24 in (610 mm)
- Cartridge: .577 paper cartridge Pritchett-type ball
- Caliber: .577 (24 in)
- Action: Percussion lock
- Feed system: Muzzle-loaded

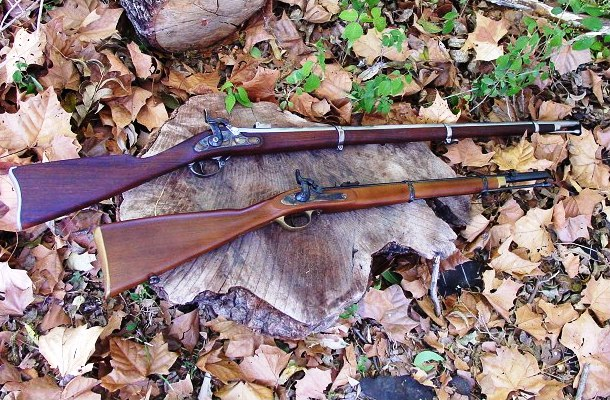
Model 1863 Springfield rifled musket and Pattern 1861 Enfield musketoon

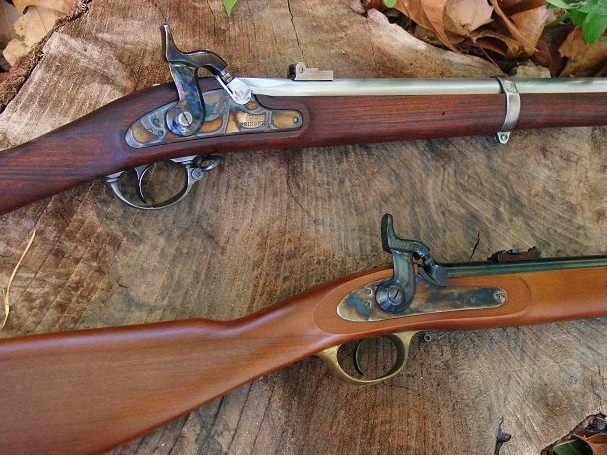
Springfield and Enfield actions

The Pattern 1861 Enfield musketoon was a short-barrel version (610 mm or 24 inches) of the Pattern 1853 Enfield rifled musket, having a faster rifling twist rate (1:48 versus 1:78), along with more rifling grooves (five grooves versus the Pattern 1853's three grooves), which made it as accurate as the rifle at shorter ranges. The much shorter barrel would otherwise reduce the accuracy at longer ranges. The shorter rifle was therefore easier to carry and reload.

The other short model is the Pattern 1856 Enfield Carbine, also known as a "saddle ring" carbine.

== Usage ==
In the British Army, the Pattern 1861 Type III was issued to artillery units, who required a weapon for personal defence and which could be more easily wielded from horseback. They were also imported by Caleb Huse, arms procurement for the Confederacy during the American Civil War and issued to artillery and cavalry units. However, the longer Pattern 1853 was more suitable for infantry units which fought in line formation of several ranks deep, in order to minimize the risk that the men in the rear ranks would accidentally shoot the men in the front ranks in the back of the head, or scorch their faces and burst their eardrums with the muzzle blast. The total procurement of carbines and artillery musketoons by the Confederacy reached approximately 4,500 units. According to U.S. Ordnance records, the total number of units imported by the Union for service remains unconfirmed, with estimates ranging from 480 to 730.

The Minié bullet is Enfield-Pritchett, a smooth-sided, hollow-based projectile originally designed for the Pattern 1853 Enfield rifle-musket, which was frequently shortened into carbines known as musketoons (such as the Parker Hale or 1861 Enfield). Unlike the greased-groove Minié ball used by the US, the Pritchett was paper-patched to fit tightly in the barrel, relying on the force of the explosion to expand its skirt into the rifling for accuracy.

Argentine cavalry used the M1842/51 Enfield musketoon during the campaign.

The Meiji government maintained precise registration of firearms, recording imported Pattern 1861 Enfields for inventory and deployment need for cavalry.

Canadian militia forces were equipped with the musketoon variant of the "Short Enfield," while the Fenian raiders utilized Enfield musketoons sourced from American Civil War surplus inventories as well. Its short barrel gave it excellent maneuverability for mounted or tight-quarters use, making it ideal for the naval and artillery units that met O'Neill's force at Fort Erie.

It was much liked for its ease of handling, and being designed for use with Minié ball bullets they could have a lethal range of up to 500 yards. Yataghan saber bayonet can be compa rable with 1856/58/60/61 pattern short musket.

This weapon is often referred to as a musketoon but due to it having a rifled barrel is more accurately known as a carbine. Note that Enfield Pattern 58 'short rifle' is almost a foot [30cms] longer. This mistake is prevalent in the popular literature probably due to the misnomer being applied to a Parker Hale reproduction.

== See also ==
- Tallassee carbine, closely patterned after the Enfield model
- Calisher and Terry carbine, a British early bolt action of very similar design
- British military rifles
- Rifles in the American Civil War
