= Lobster-tailed pot helmet =

Burgonet with a long neck guard

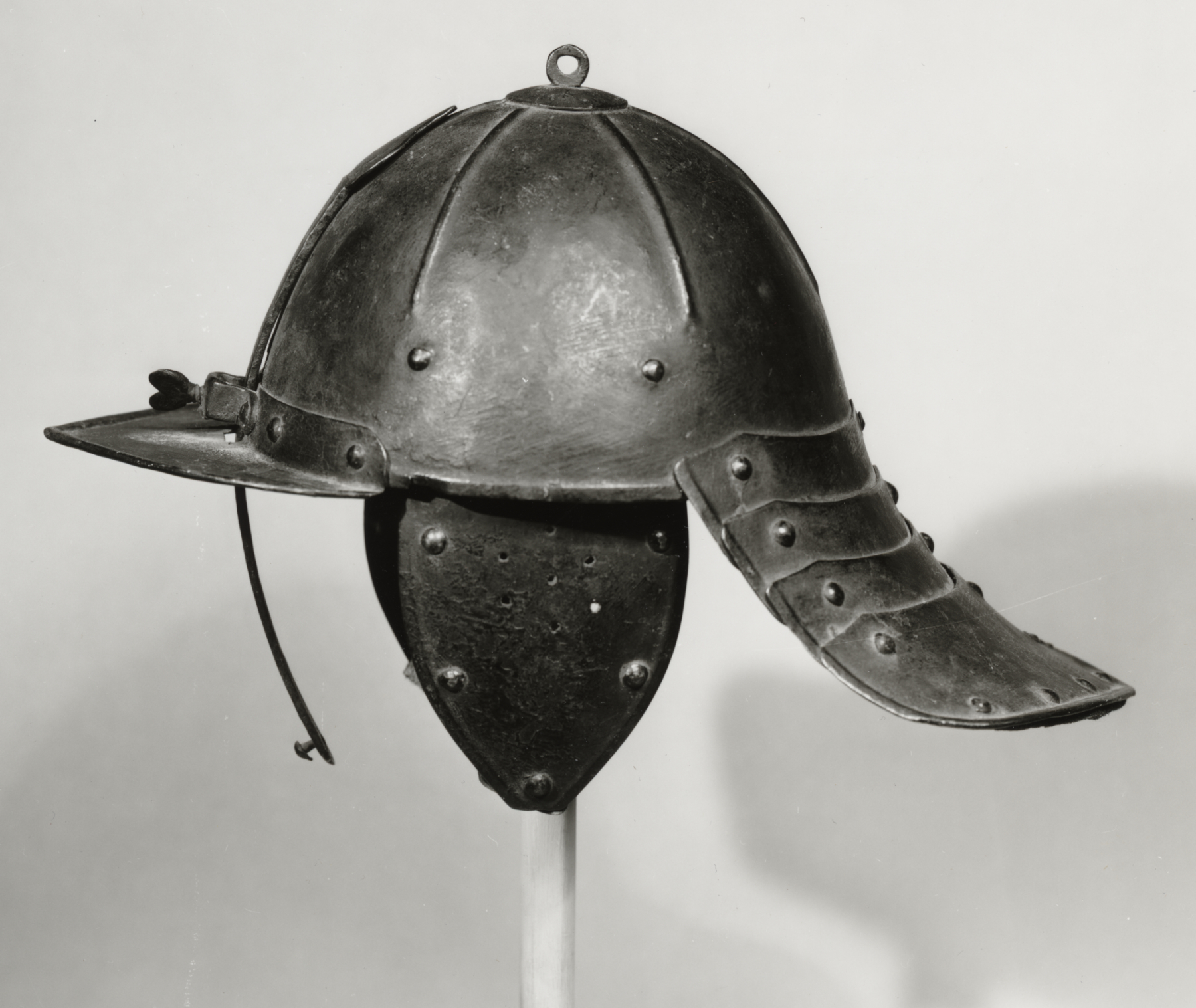
Lobster-tailed pot helmet. This example has a single sliding nasal bar and fixed peak to protect the face, Dutch mid-17th century.

The lobster-tailed pot helmet, also known as the zischägge, horseman's pot and harquebusier's pot, was a type of combat helmet. It was derived from an Ottoman Turkish helmet type. From c. 1600, it became popular in most of Europe and was especially worn by cavalrymen and officers. The helmet gradually fell out of use in most of Europe in the late 17th century; however, the Austrian heavy cavalry retained it for some campaigns as late as the 1780s.

== Origin ==
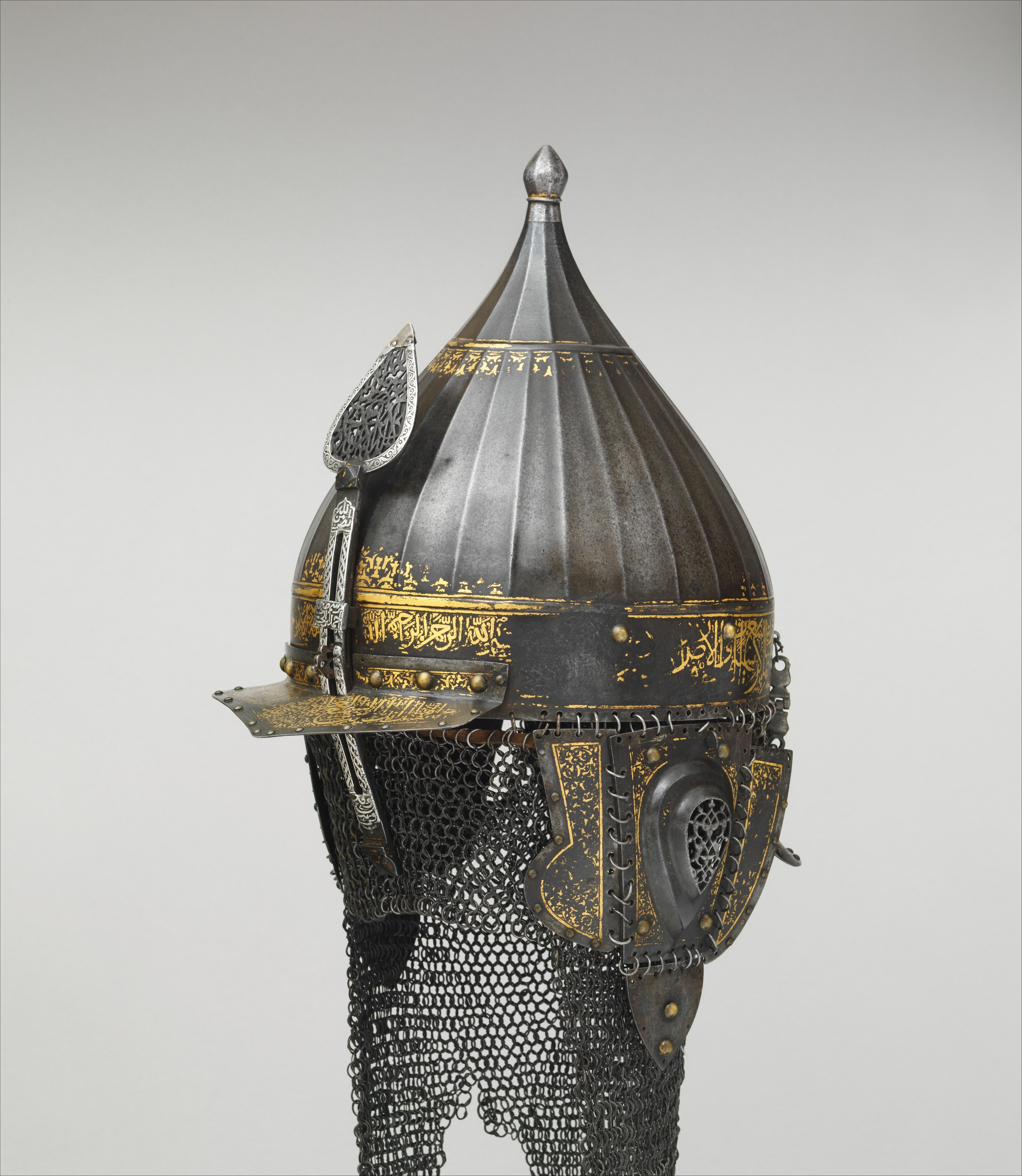
A Turkish Çiçak helmet (16th century), ancestral to the later lobster-tailed pot helmet. The cheekpieces and neck guard are supplemented by a mail defence in this example (The Metropolitan Museum of Art)

The lobster-tailed pot helmet had an oriental origin, being derived from the Ottoman Turkish çiçak helmet (pronounced 'chichak', in Turkish – çiçek - meaning 'flower' which is attributed to the shape of the helmet's skull), which developed in the 16th century. It was adopted by the Christian states of Europe in the early 17th century. The chichak was almost identical to the later European helmets – it had a forward projecting peak, sliding bar nasal, cheekpieces and neck guard; only its tendency to have a conical rather than rounded skull was distinctive. The European derivative of this helmet saw widespread use during the Thirty Years War when it became known as the zischägge, a Germanisation of the original Turkish name.

== Characteristics ==
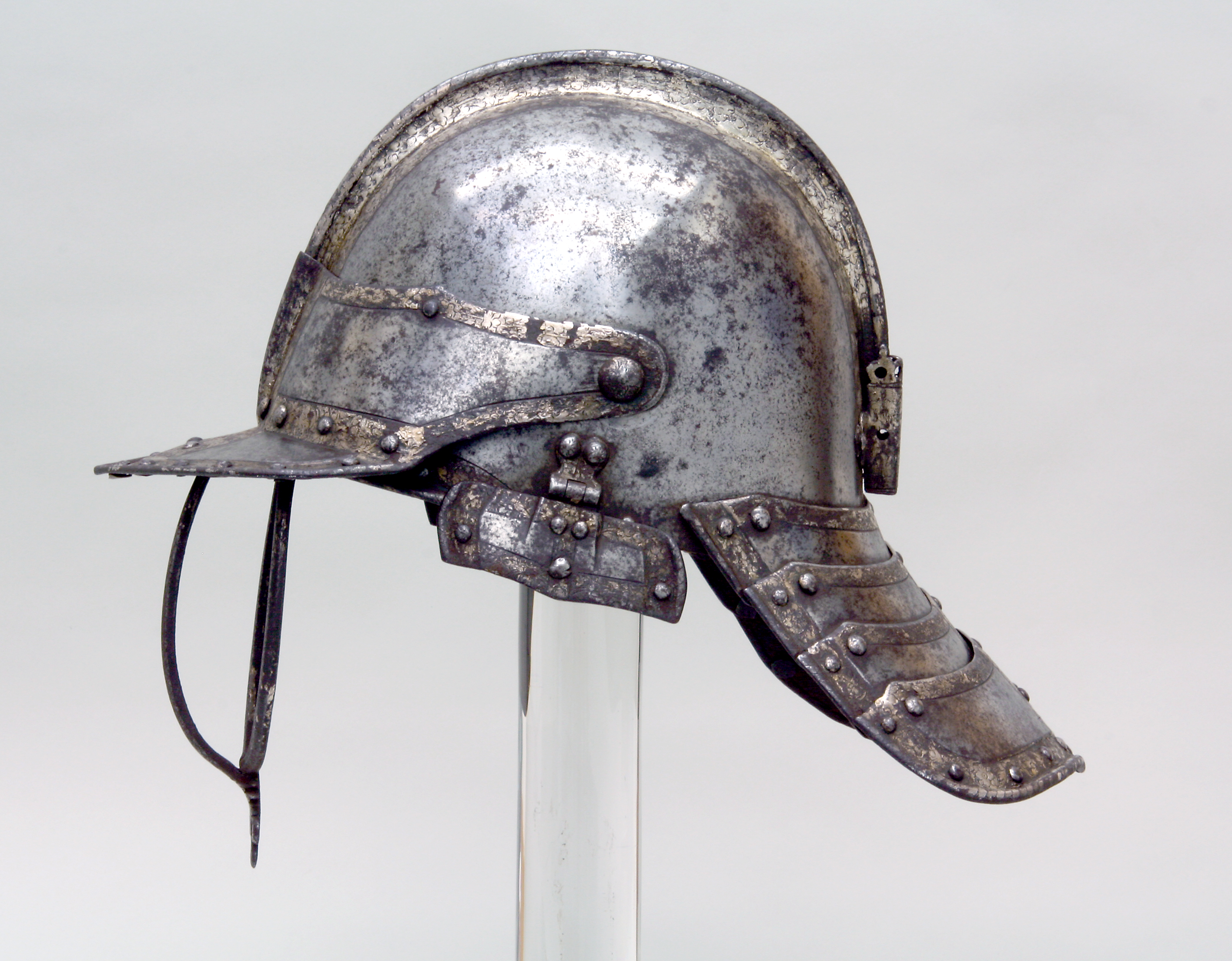
English helmet for a harquebusier c. 1635, with typical three-barred face protection and longitudinal comb on the skull, the laminated and hinged cheekpiece is incomplete

The lobster-tailed pot had a rounded skull-piece, which was sometimes fluted. The skulls of English-made helmets were usually formed from two sections, joined by a raised comb running from front to back; the skulls of helmets manufactured on the continent were most often raised from a single-piece of metal. Cheekpieces, commonly made in one piece but occasionally articulated, were attached to the skull by leather strapping; however, the better quality examples are sometimes hinged. To protect the face there was either a fixed forward projecting peak that incorporated a sliding nasal bar retained by a large screw, or a hinged peak with three attached bars. Finally, the helmet had a laminated defence (or a single piece of plate ridged to imitate separate lames) to protect the back of the head and neck that was said to resemble the tail of a lobster. Another common name for the helmet was the "harquebusier's pot", the harquebusier being the most common type of cavalry in Western Europe during the 17th century. The single nasal-bar type was characteristic of Continental Europe, whilst the three-barred type with a pivoting peak was more widely used in the British Isles. Many European-made lobster-tailed pot helmets were later imported to Britain during the English Civil War. Occasionally, older helmets like the burgonet or sallet were modified to resemble the 'lobster-pot.' As stated by General George Monck in 1644, the "headpiece with three small bars" was intended to be pistol-proof.

== Decoration and appearance ==
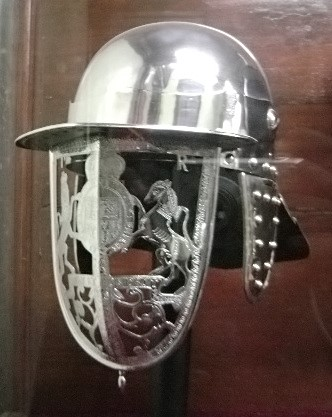
Modern reproduction of a helmet of James II of England made in 1686. The face protection is in the form of an openwork depiction of the royal coat-of-arms

The appearance and finish of lobster-tailed pots varied greatly, from the highly decorated, superb-quality examples made for individual commanders down to crudely executed "munition-quality" types, which were mass-produced to equip large numbers of ordinary cavalry troopers. High quality helmets could be decorated using a range of techniques, including repoussé, engraving and blue-and-gilt finishes. An extant helmet made for King James II of England had the three bar face defence replaced by a pierced openwork plate depicting the full royal arms of England, sight being afforded by spaces within the design. Many helmets were blackened or browned as a treatment to weatherproof them and protect against rust. The better quality helmets given this treatment would often have had their sombre appearance relieved by the use of numerous gilded rivet heads. Some of the most flamboyantly decorated helmets were produced for the Polish winged hussars, with metal crests and enlarged, decoratively shaped, nasals being not uncommon. A number of extant helmets have tubular plume-holders attached, this, taken with the evidence of contemporary illustrations, indicates the use of feather plumes.

== Use ==
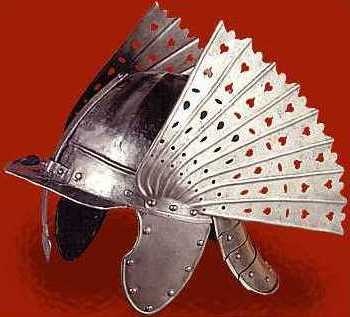
Polish Hussar szyszak with elaborate wing-like crests of pierced metal, 17th century

This form of helmet was widely used during the Thirty Years' War and the English Civil War; it was commonly known as a zischägge in Germany and a 'horseman's pot' or 'three-barred pot' in Britain; the term 'lobster-tailed pot' is widely used in modern scholarship. The typical cavalryman of the period, the harquebusier, would have worn the helmet with a buff coat, bridle-hand gauntlet and breastplate and backplate. It was also sometimes worn by a more heavily armoured type of cavalry, the cuirassier, combined with three-quarter armour. It was used by cavalry on both sides of the English Civil War including Oliver Cromwell's Ironside cavalry. The common misconception of Cavaliers wearing plumed wide-brimmed hats whilst the Roundheads wore helmets is definitively disproved by a surviving order signed by Charles I himself for 33 'potts', along with other cavalry armour, for the use of his own troop of horse in 1642. Another order, this time from the Parliamentarian authorities, dating to 1644 for 300 "potts with three barres English" indicates that each helmet, no doubt of basic quality, cost 7 shillings. Similar helmets were worn in the 17th century by Polish winged hussars and were termed "szyszak" in Polish, again a derivative of the original Turkish name. Austrian cuirassiers were equipped with the lobster-tailed pot helmet as late as the 1780s, long after its use had died out elsewhere, when campaigning against the Ottoman Turks.

== Gallery ==
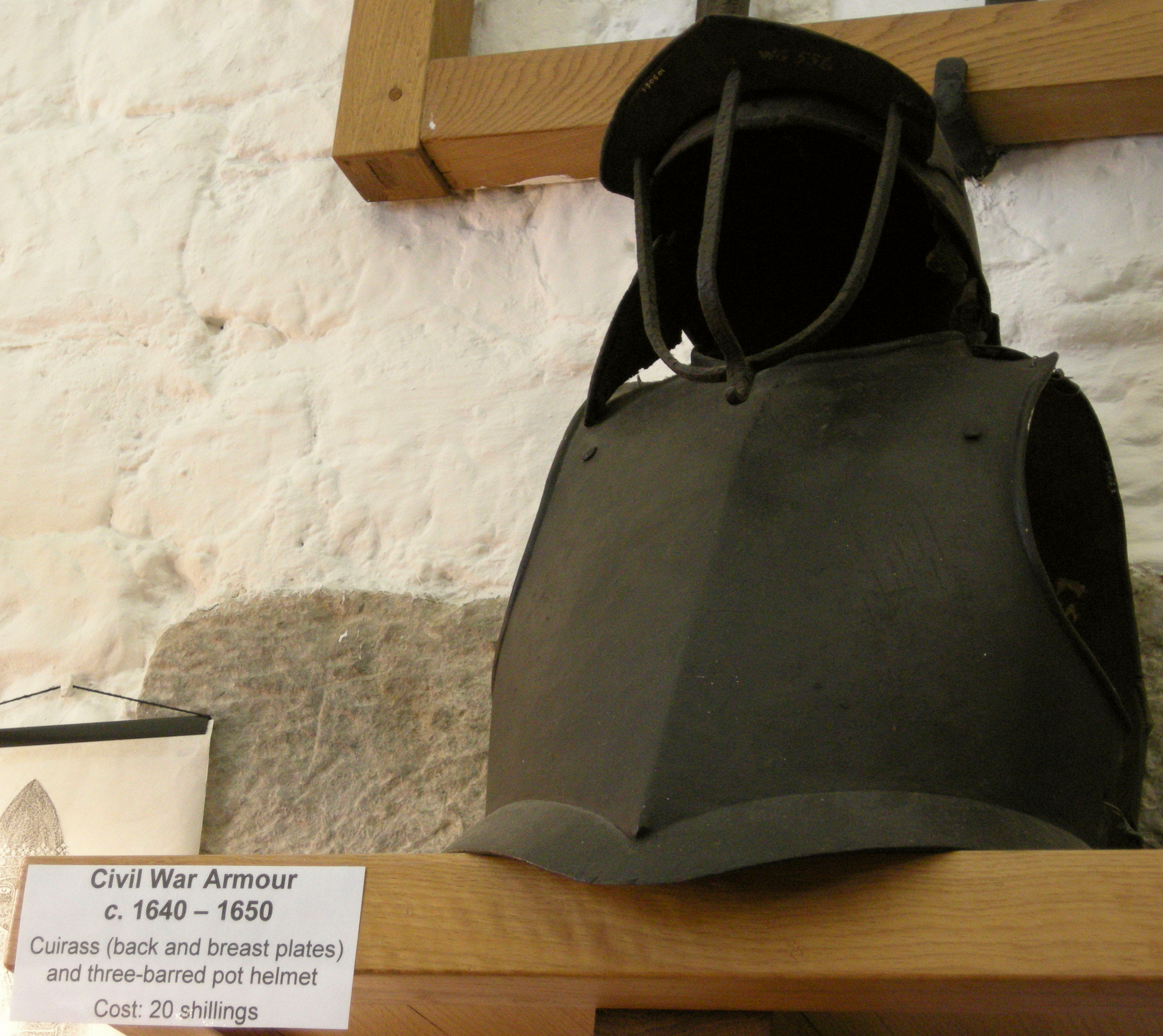
Cuirass and lobster-tailed pot helmet of the English Civil War (1642–1651), displayed at West Gate Towers and Museum, Canterbury, England.

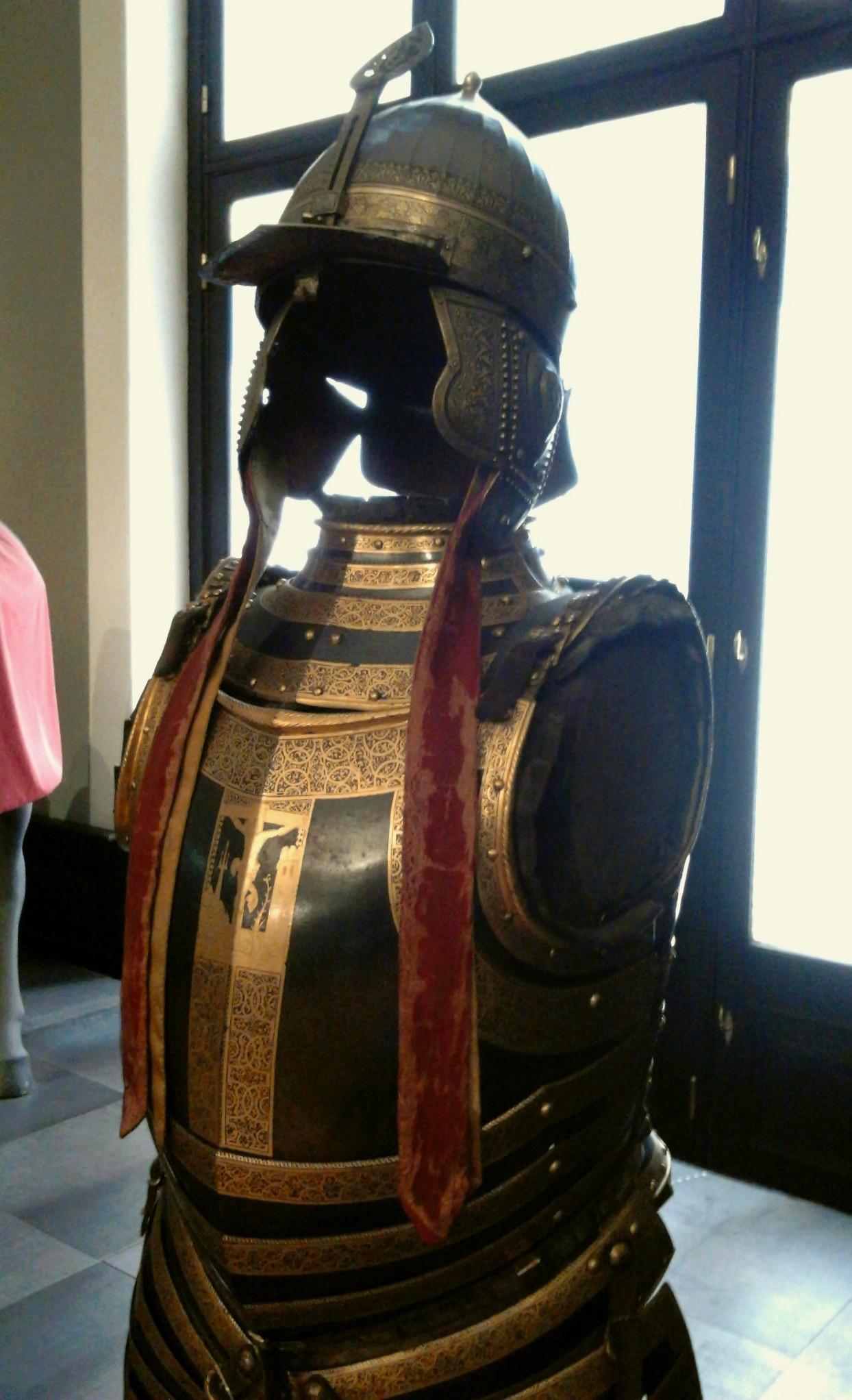
Armour of Stephen Báthory (c. 1560, later King of Poland), displayed at the Kunsthistorisches Museum in Vienna, Austria.

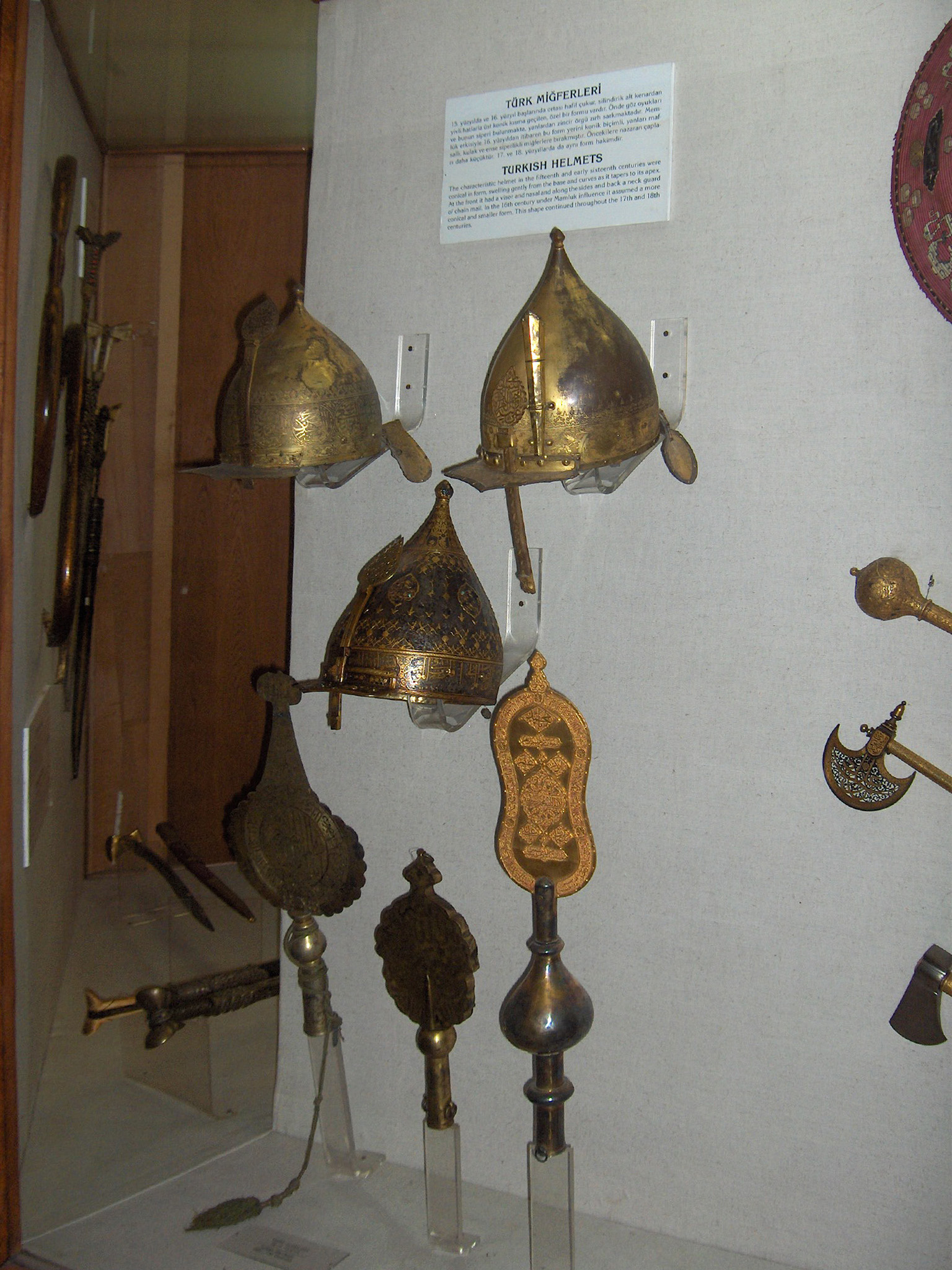
Turkish conical helmets of 15th to early 16th century, displayed at Topkapı Palace, Istanbul, Turkey.

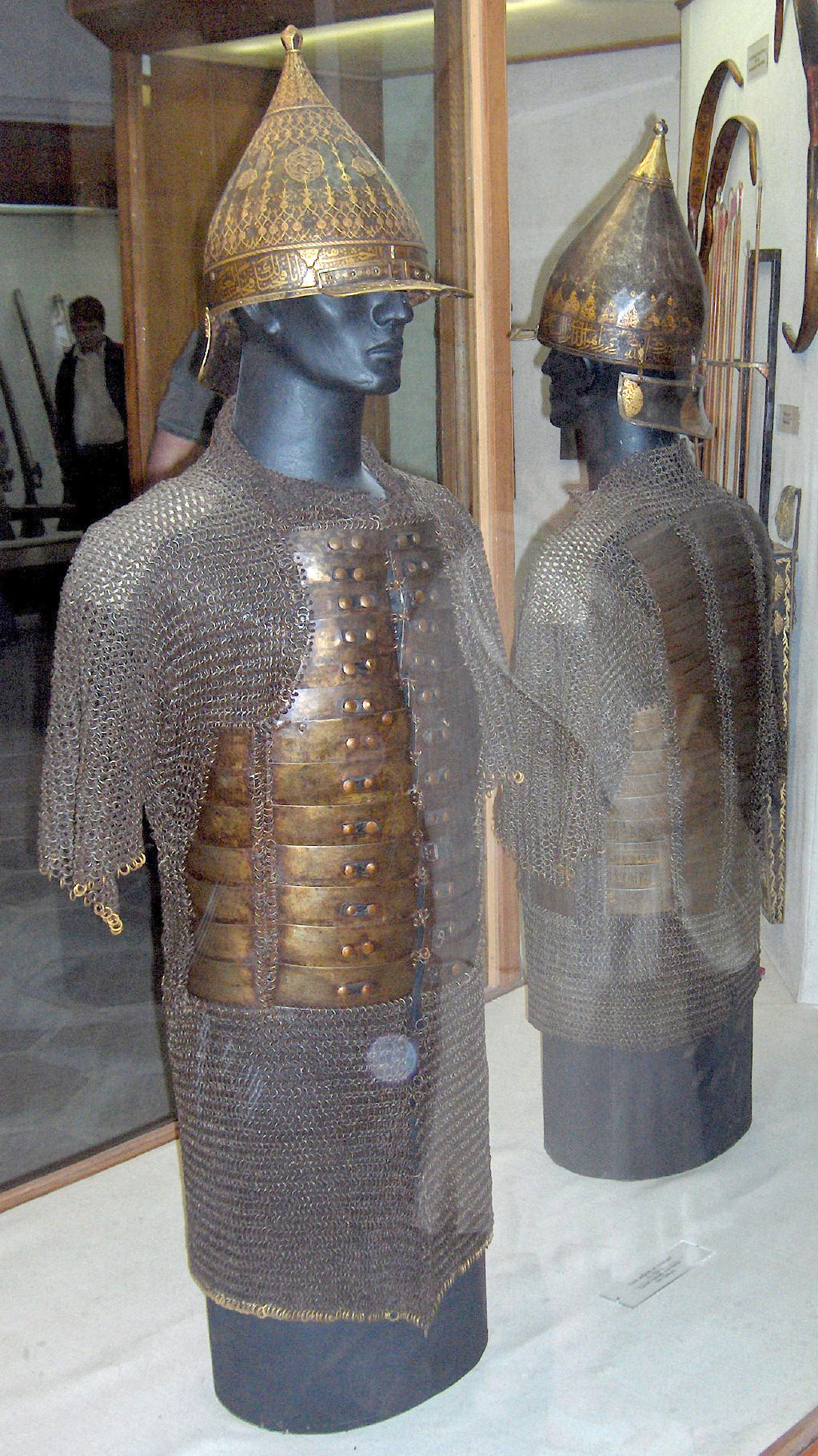
Turkish conical helmets and body armour of 15th to early 16th century, displayed at Topkapı Palace, Istanbul, Turkey.

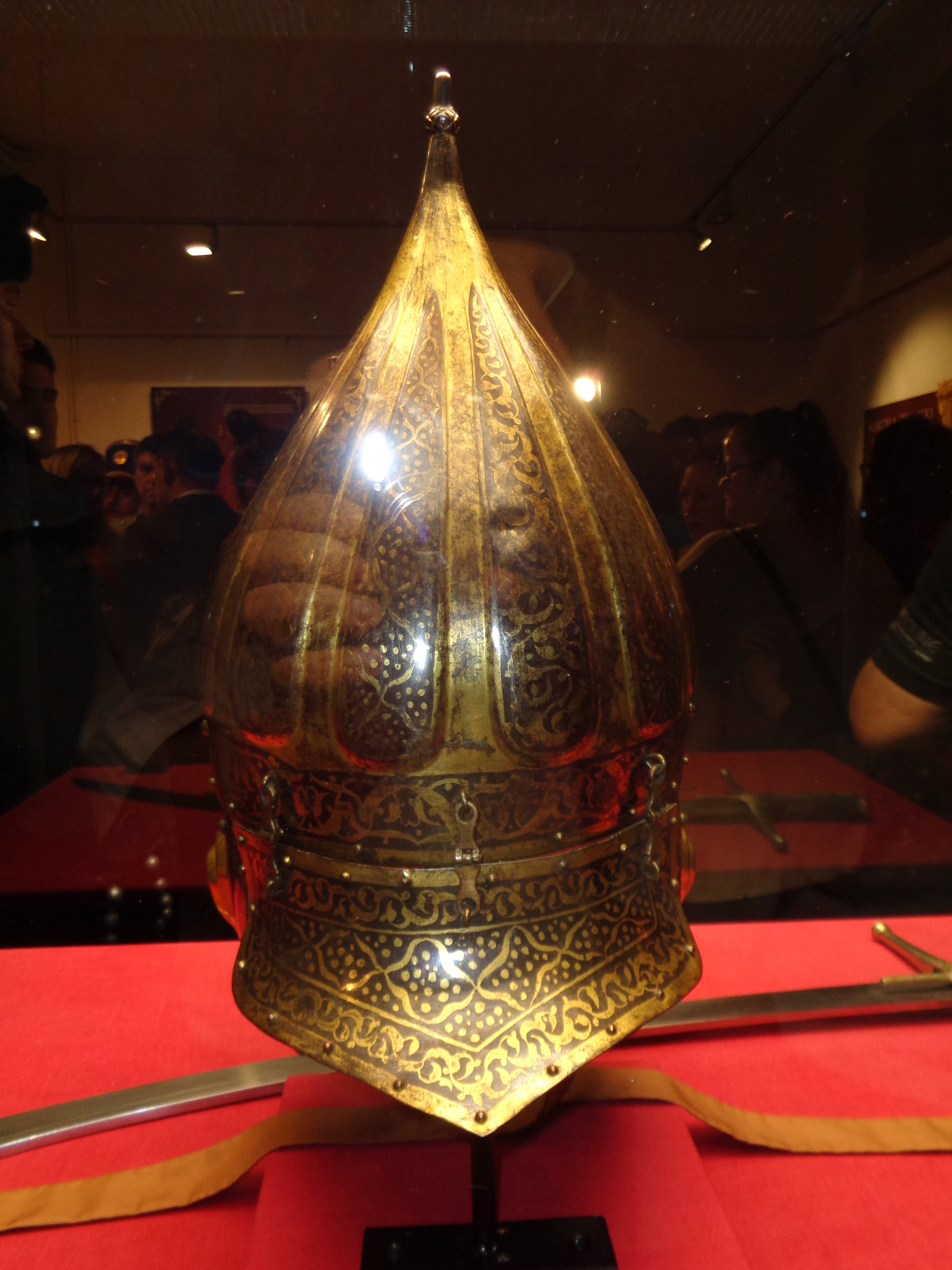
Chichak (šišak, zischagge or erikhonka) of Nikola Šubić Zrinski (1508–1566), Ban (Viceroy) of Croatia, at an exhibition in Čakovec on the 450th anniversary of the battle of Szigetvár – rear side
