= Obuch =

Polish Renaissance weapon

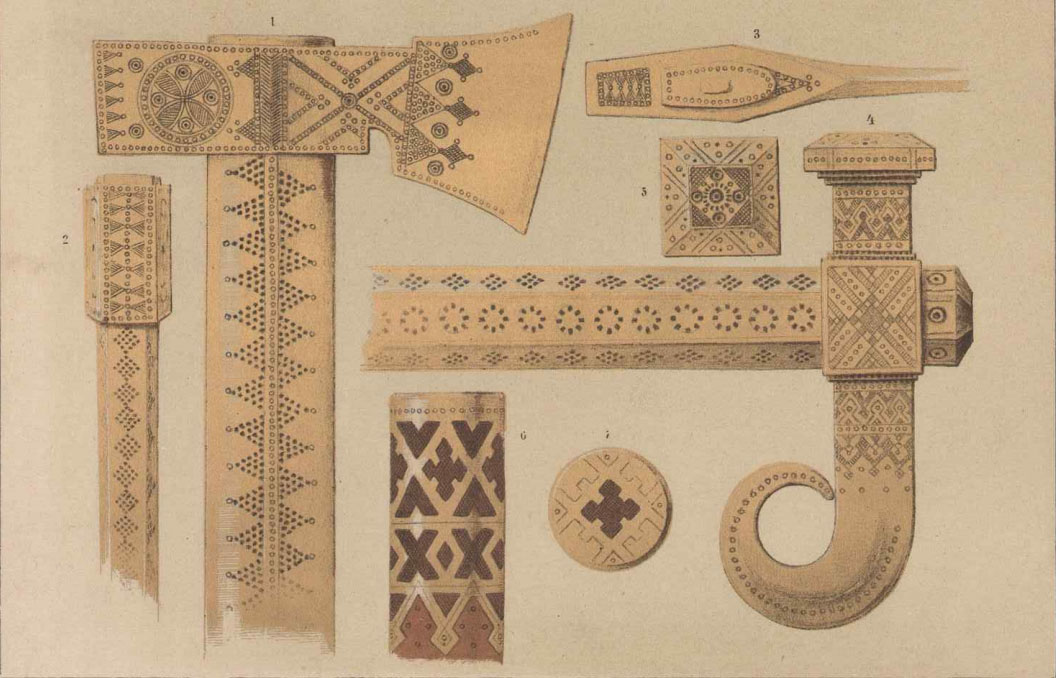
The head of an obuch (with a rolled up beak)

The obuch, obuszek or obuszysko is a type of melee weapon, very similar to a horseman's pick (Polish: nadziak) but differing from it with a curved beak opposite the hammer. In Poland, it was customary to distinguish this type of weapon by the type of tip: if it has a sharp, perpendicular beak, it is a horseman's pick; if the beak is curled downward, it is an obuch; if it has an axe head, it is a czekan. Most often there was a hammer on the opposite side of the blade.

Used from the 16th to the 18th century by the Szlachta (Polish nobility), it often had a shaft length of 80 to 100 cm (31 to 39 in) and was carried like a staff and was often bound in velvet and gold twine.

It was a weapon often used in duels and brawls. It was supposed to be safer than a horseman's pick, from which it was made, but the difference was not great, for which reason it was forbidden to bring this type of weapon to sejmiks and also to some churches.

In old Poland, wearing an obuch was so common (for nobles) that it spawned the saying: Bez karabeli ani z pościeli, bez obuszka ani od łóżka ("Don't leave your bedding without a karabela, don't leave your bed without an obuch"). It was a common secondary weapon to a Polish sabre (karabela).

== Sources ==
- Polish Renaissance Warfare: obuch, hammer, czekan
- Zdzisław Żygulski (junior), 1982: Broń w dawnej Polsce na tle uzbrojenia Europy i Bliskiego Wschodu. Warszawa: PWN. ISBN 83-01-02515-8
