= Blunderbuss =

Type of firearm with a flared muzzle

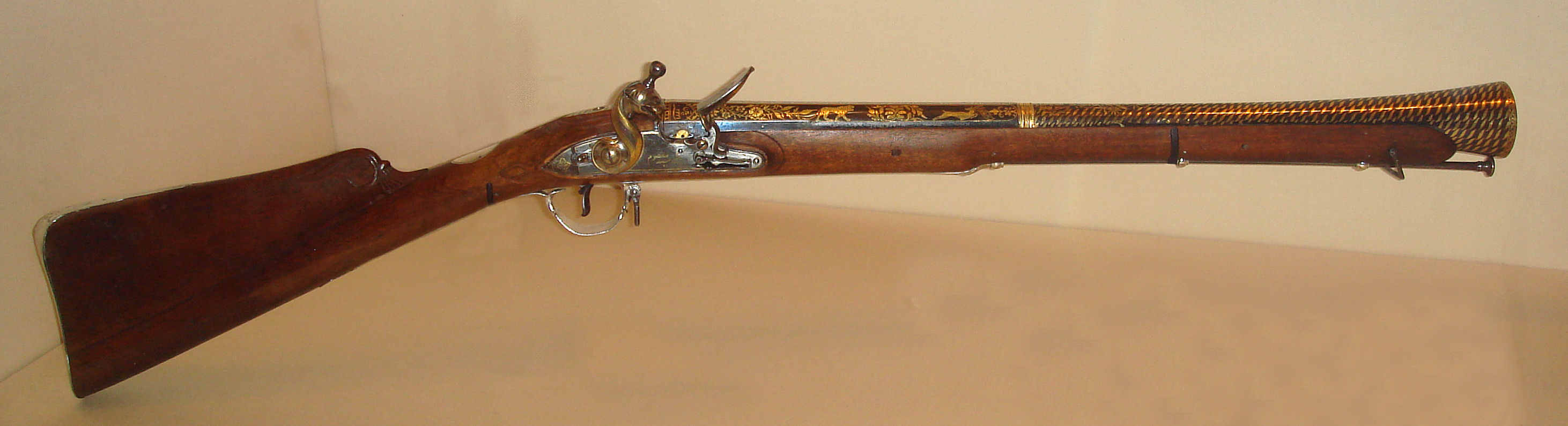
A flintlock blunderbuss, built for Tipu Sultan

The blunderbuss is a seventeenth- to mid-nineteenth-century muzzle-loading firearm with a short, large-caliber, smoothbore barrel. It features a flared muzzle to facilitate loading shot, which usually consisted of a dozen or so projectiles ranging from .25 in (6.4 mm) to .35 in (8.9 mm) in diameter. The blunderbuss could also fire other types of projectiles, such as slugs or improvised ammunition including nails, rocks, glass, or tightly packed metal rods known as "bundle shot." It is considered an early predecessor of the modern shotgun. Although effective at short range, it lacked accuracy over longer distances. A handgun version of the blunderbuss was called a dragon, from which the term dragoon is derived.

== Etymology ==
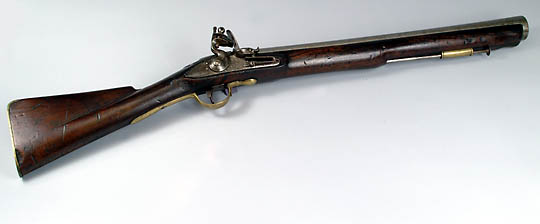
An English flintlock blunderbuss

The term "blunderbuss" is of Dutch origin, from the Dutch word donderbus, which is a combination of donder, meaning "thunder", and bus, meaning "container, tin" (Middle Dutch: busse, box, jar, from Latin buxus, box tree).

The transition from donder to blunder is thought by some to be deliberate; the term blunder was originally used in a transitive sense, synonymous with to confuse or to make stupid, and this is thought to describe the stunningly loud report of the large-bore, short-barreled blunderbuss. The term dragon is taken from the fact that early versions were decorated with a carving in the form of a mythic dragon's head around the muzzle; the muzzle blast would then give the impression of a fire-breathing dragon.

== History ==
=== 16th century ===
Who invented the blunderbuss, where, and when, is a subject of debate. While the flintlock blunderbuss wasn't developed until the 17th century, the concept of the blunderbuss dates back to at least Germany in the mid-16th century, early examples of blunderbuss were either matchlock or wheellock firearms. A book published in Frankfurt in 1556 titled Von Kayserlichem Kriegsrechten ("On Imperial Laws of War") described a gun that fits the description of a blunderbuss: "a short-barrel smooth-bore gun shooting 12 or 15 bullets of musket bore". The blunderbuss appears to have spread from Germany to Holland by the late 1500s, the Westfries Museum in Hoorn, Netherlands has a matchlock blunderbuss that is dated to around 1600, with contemporary reports it may have been used in a battle at Zuiderzee in 1573. An inventor from Echten, The Netherlands named Henrick Theilmans was granted a patent on October 26, 1598 for a type of gun called the "Donderbus" (Dutch for "blunderbuss"), a gun that was intended for use on land or sea that was capable of firing 1 pound (450 g) of shot at a distance of approximately 500 paces, or about 1,250 ft (380 m).

=== 17th century ===
The blunderbuss started becoming more prevalent in the mid-1600s after the invention of the flintlock mechanism, by then the blunderbuss had become common in places like the Ottoman Empire in Turkey and the Middle East. A major myth surrounding the blunderbuss is that it was commonly used by the early American Pilgrims, many depictions of early Pilgrims in popular media in the early to mid-20th century incorrectly showed Pilgrims armed with flintlock blunderbusses. This was especially true of depictions of the First Thanksgiving, comics and cartoons, such as Disney's Daffy Duck and Porky Pig incorrectly depict the Pilgrims using blunderbusses. While it hadn't become common yet, matchlock and wheellock blunderbusses did exist when the Pilgrims migrated from England to Holland in 1607 to escape religious persecution, and then sailed to North America in 1620. However, the flintlock blunderbuss that Pilgrims were depicted using in comics, cartoons, and films were not invented until about 30 years after the Pilgrims landed at Plymouth Rock in 1620. Further, there is no archeological or historical evidence that Pilgrims used blunderbusses. However there is ample evidence they used matchlock and wheellock muskets, which were much more suited to the wide open spaces the Pilgrims found themselves in.

==== The Blunderbuss & Pirates ====
The height of the blunderbuss was during the Golden Age of Piracy from the mid-17th century through the mid-18th century, when high unemployment and desperation in the wake of multiple wars such as the War of Spanish Succession turned more and more people to a life of piracy. Being perfectly suited for close quarters combat, the blunderbuss became a popular weapon for pirates, merchant crews, and sailors of the Royal Navy & Spanish Navy when hunting pirates. Blunderbusses were often mounted on a ship’s railing or gunwales via a mounting swivel, and used to rake the deck of an enemy ship with buckshot and other projectiles, and were excellent for repelling boarders in the confined spaces below decks. They were also mounted on the bow of dinghies and used as a defensive gun when boarding another ship, or going ashore. The blunderbuss' flared muzzle also made it easier to reload during the chaos of battle than a musket, as the user had to contend with the ship rocking back-and-forth, wet slippery decks, or being in a precarious place like the rigging or Crow's nest.

=== 18th century ===
By the turn of the 18th century, the blunderbuss had become a common defensive weapon carried by coachmen in England for defense against highwayman, the name given to thieves that robbed people who were traveling along roads, especially in the more isolated areas of the countryside. The blunderbuss' shot pattern made hitting targets from a moving coach much easier than a musket. This led to the blunderbuss being called "coach guns" or "coaching guns" in England, with the term later being adopted for shorter double barreled shotguns known as a coach gun. It was common for people of wealth and importance to carry blunderbusses for protection, in addition to their driver being armed, when traveling through the English countryside. By the late-18th century it was common for civilian owned blunderbusses in England to be equipped with a bayonet on a hinge near the muzzle, some were even configured to deploy the bayonet after the gun was fired as a secondary means of protection. The majority of surviving blunderbusses found today date from 1750 to 1830, many are ones that belonged to the aristocracy and wealthy of England, some of which are gold plated and feature very ornate engraving, which are the most sought after by collectors. With the invention of the double barrel flintlock shotgun in 1790 that could hold two shots, and the development of the percussion cap in the 1820s, the popularity of the blunderbuss began to decline. By the mid-1850s the invention of the paper cartridge allowed both barrels of a percussion cap shotgun to be loaded far more rapidly than a blunderbuss' single barrel, this made the blunderbuss fall out of favor even more quickly; and by 1870 the prevalence of short, inexpensive double-barreled shotguns and the advent of the centerfire metallic shotgun cartridge made the blunderbuss completely obsolete and extinct.

== Design and use ==
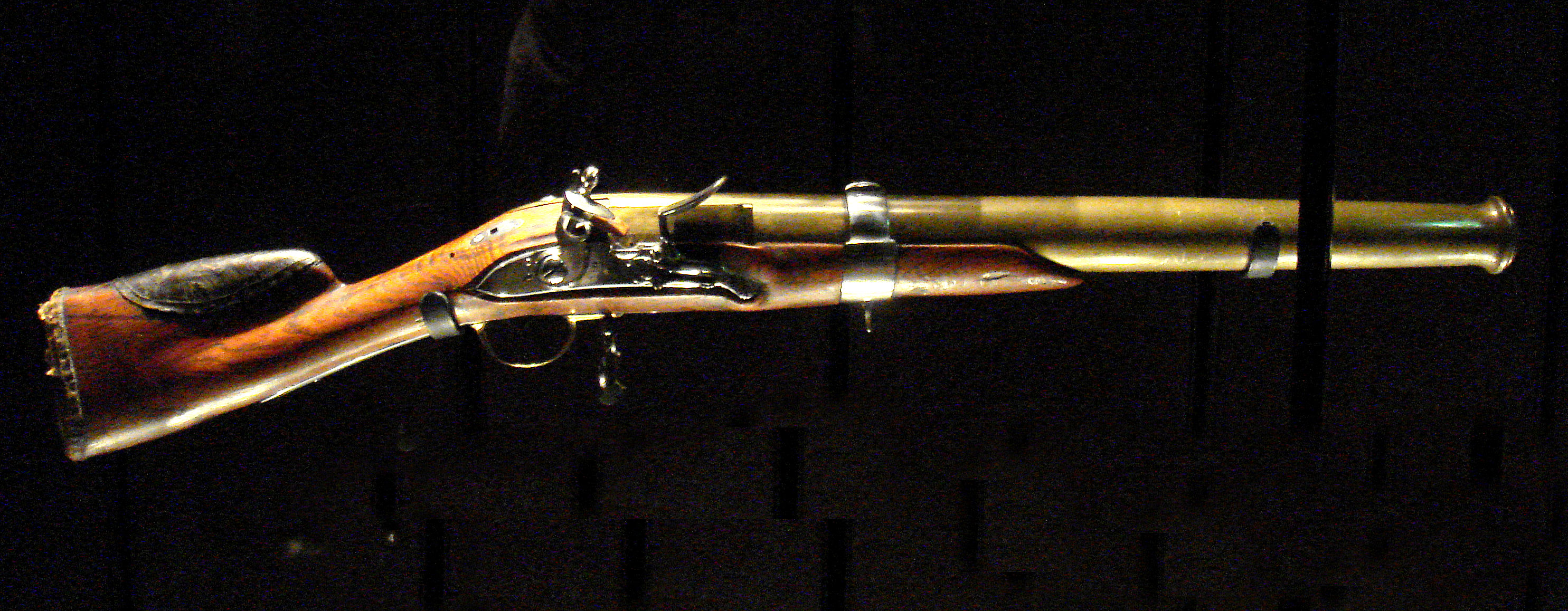
A French blunderbuss, called an espingole, 1760, France

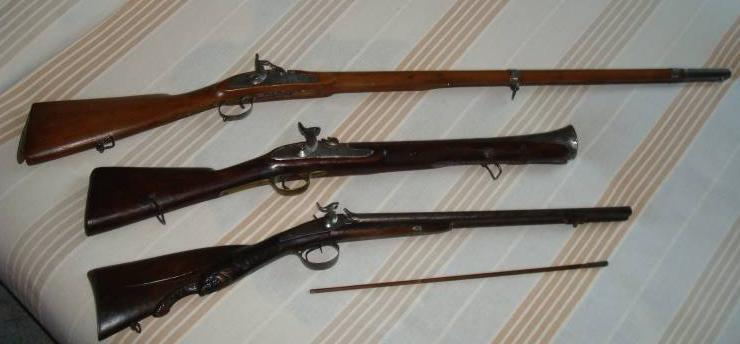
Musketoon, blunderbuss and coach gun from the American Civil War era

=== Design and characteristics ===
The flared muzzle is the defining feature of the blunderbuss, differentiating it from large caliber carbines; the distinction between the blunderbuss and the musketoon is less distinct, as musketoons were also used to fire shot, and some had flared barrels.

The muzzle (and often the bore) was flared. The flare was to aid in reloading, the flare did not spread the shot. Modern experiments corroborated the dramatic improvement in shot spread, from a 530-millimetre-spread (21-inch) diameter from a straight barrel to an average of 970 mm (38 in) spread at 9 metres (10 yards). However, the methodology and conclusions of these tests have been questioned.

Blunderbusses were typically short, with barrels under 60 centimetres (2 ft) in length, at a time when a typical musket barrel was over 90 cm (3 ft) long. One source, describing arms from the early to middle 17th century, lists the barrel length of a wheel lock dragon at around 28 cm (11 in), compared to a 41 cm (16 in) length for a blunderbuss. Barrels were made of steel or brass. There is one blunderbuss, a percussion model owned by L. W. Young that has a barrel 30 inches to the flared muzzle, an exception to the rule.

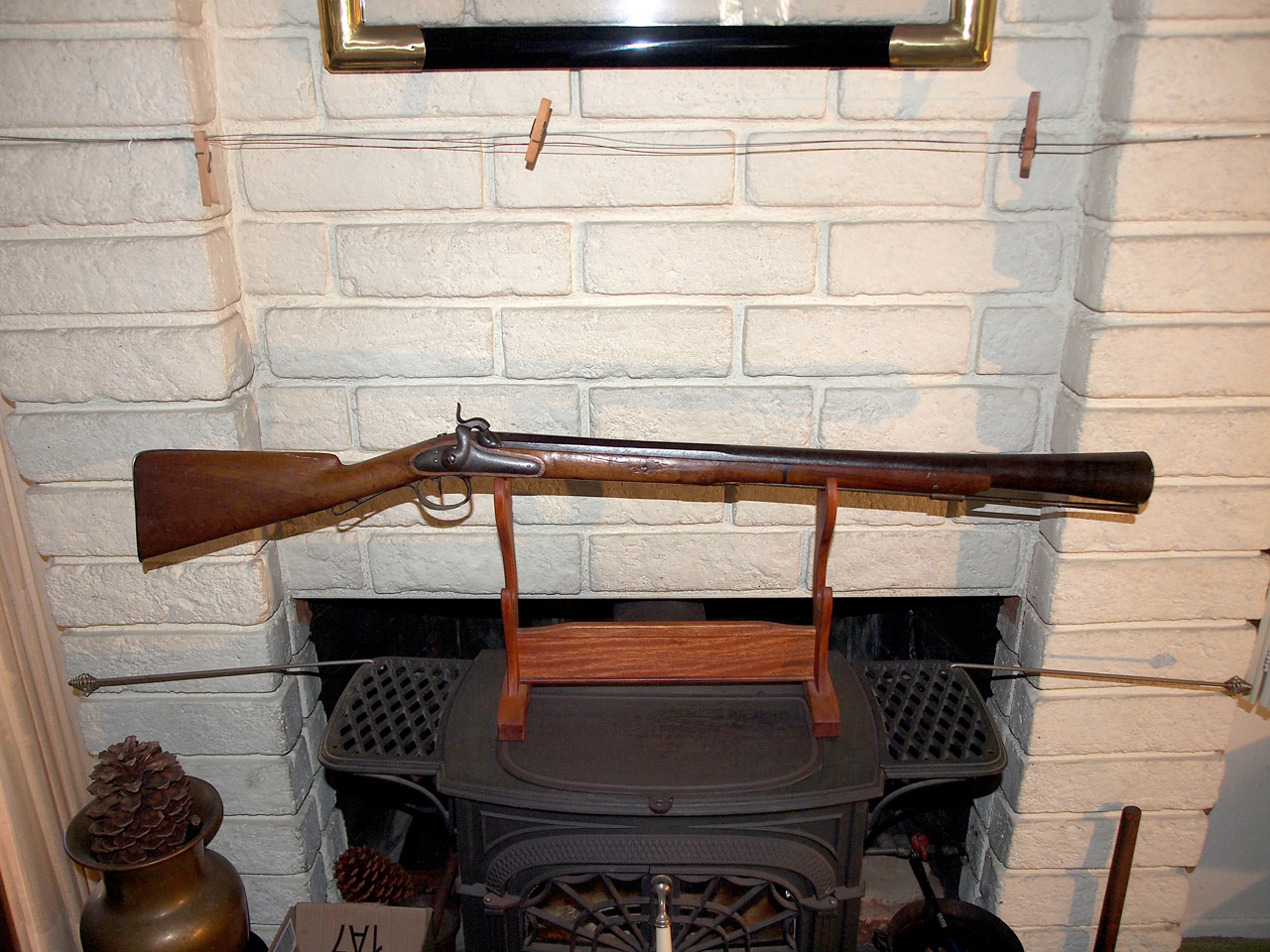
A blunderbuss with a 30-inch barrel

The blunderbuss was typically loaded with a number of lead balls smaller than the bore diameter. Although period accounts sometimes claim that it was charged with scrap iron, rocks, wood, gravel or sand, such improvised loads were likely uncommon and could result in damage to the bore of the gun.

The blunderbuss could be considered an early type of shotgun and served in many similar roles.

=== Roles and uses ===
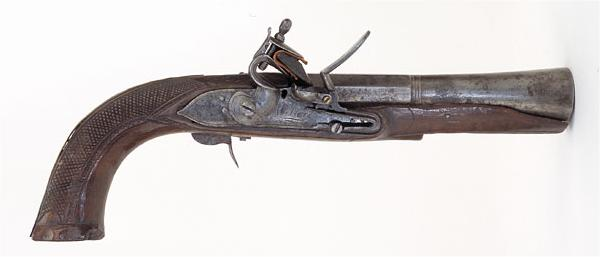
A blunderbuss pistol, or dragon, found at a battlefield in Cerro Gordo, Veracruz, Mexico

An 1808 Harper's Ferry blunderbuss, of the type carried on the Lewis and Clark Expedition

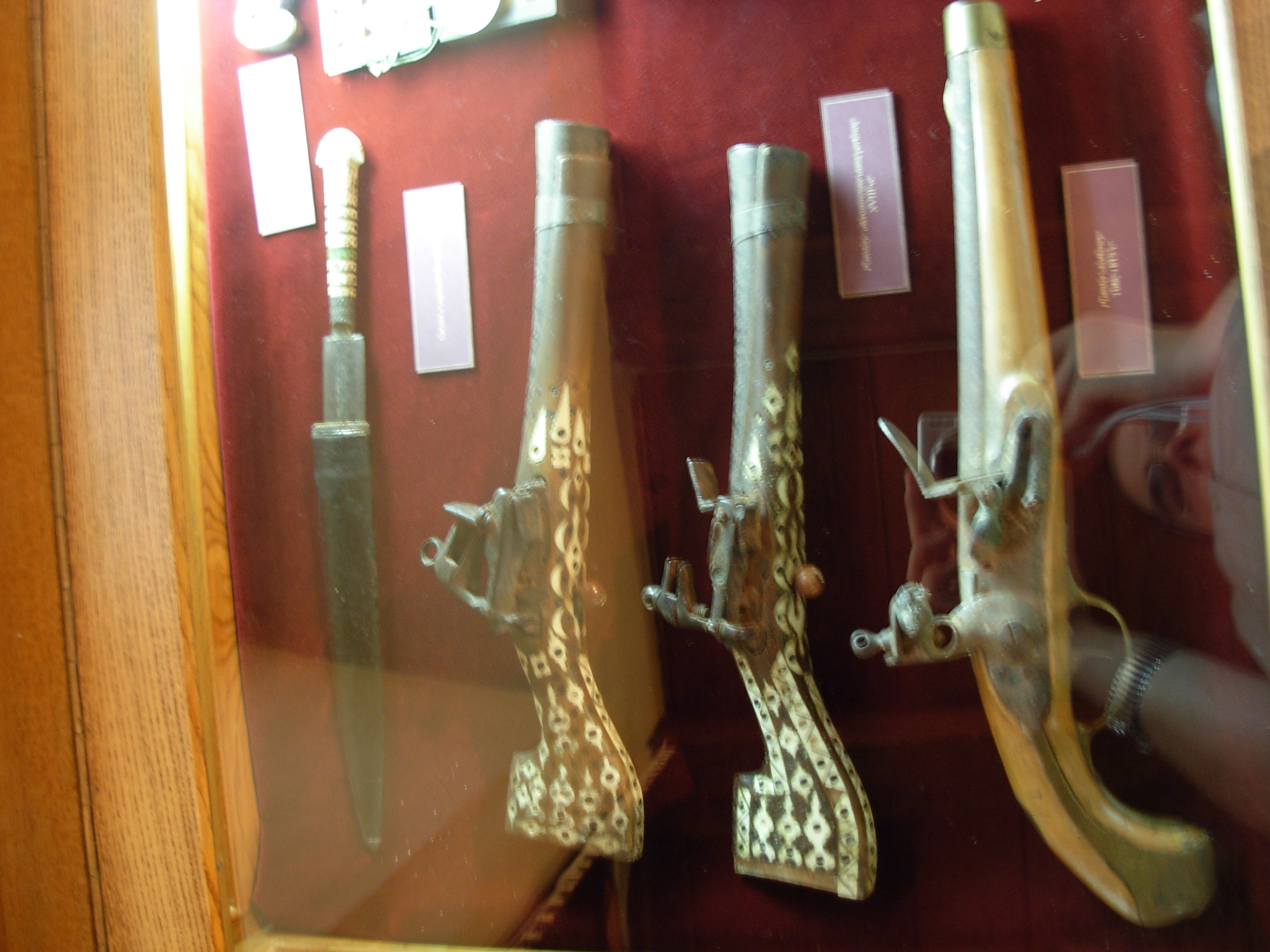
A pair of Ottoman blunderbuss pistols on display in Poland fitted with the miquelet lock

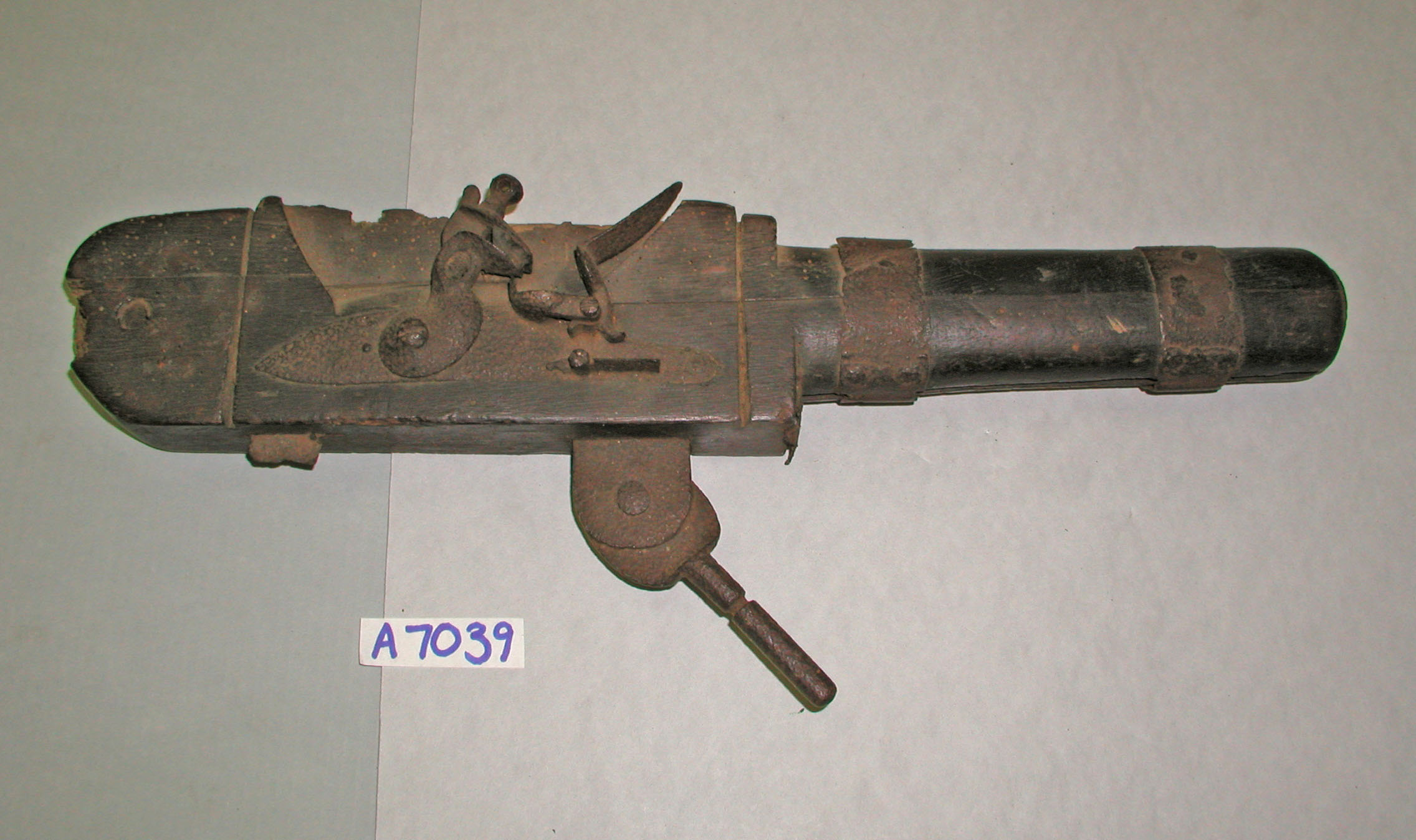
Alarm gun, designed to frighten or maim poachers and grave robbers.

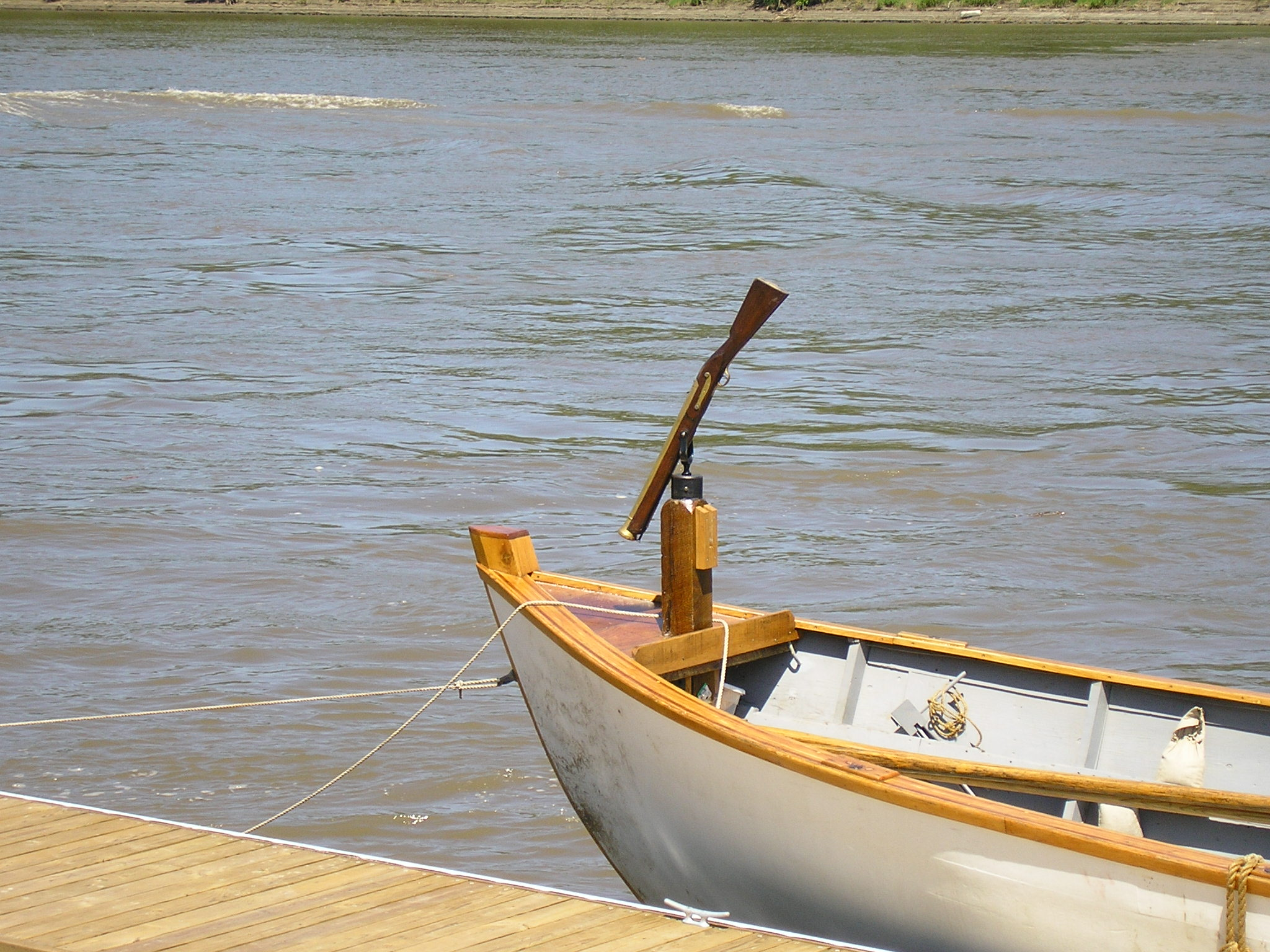
A recreation of one of Lewis and Clark's pirogues with a blunderbuss mounted to the bow with a pintle

The blunderbuss, and especially the dragon, was typically issued to troops such as cavalry, who needed a lightweight, easily handled firearm. The dragon became so associated with cavalry and mounted infantry that the term dragoon became synonymous with mounted infantry.

In addition to the cavalry, the blunderbuss found a use for other duties in which the shotgun-like qualities were desirable, such as for guarding prisoners or defending a mail coach, and its use for urban combat was also recognized.

Blunderbusses were also commonly carried by officers on naval warships, by privateers and by pirates for use in close-quarters boarding actions. The Portuguese Marines used it widely in the 17th century.

The blunderbuss used by the British Royal Mail during the period of 1788–1816 was a flintlock with a 36 cm (14 in) long flared brass barrel, brass trigger guard, and an iron trigger and lock. A typical British mail coach would have a single postal employee on board, armed with a blunderbuss and a pair of pistols to guard the mail from highwaymen.

One 18th century coaching blunderbuss in another British collection had a brass barrel 43 cm (17 in) long, flaring to 51 mm (2 in) at the muzzle; it was also provided with a spring-loaded bayonet, which was held along the barrel by a catch and would spring forward into place when released.

Spring-loaded bayonet blunderbusses were also used by the Nottingham City Police after its formation around 1840.

=== Military adoption ===
While the blunderbuss is often associated with the Plymouth Colony Pilgrims of 1620, evidence suggests that the blunderbuss was relatively scarce in the American colonies. After the Battle of Lexington in 1775, British General Thomas Gage occupied Boston, Massachusetts, and upon negotiating with the town committee, Gage agreed to let the inhabitants of Boston leave town with their families and effects if they surrendered all arms. While most of the residents of Boston stayed, those who left under the agreement surrendered 1,778 long arms, 634 pistols, 273 bayonets, and only 38 blunderbusses. The blunderbuss did still have its civilian applications, however; the Lewis and Clark Expedition carried a number of blunderbusses, some of which were mounted and used as small swivel guns on the pirogues.

The American Navy issued their first standardized blunderbuss during the War of 1812. The M1814 Blunderbuss was manufactured at Harpers Ferry, Springfield Armory and also in Canton, Massachusetts. During the 1830s these were converted from flintlock to cap and ball. American inventor and naval officer John A. Dahlgren designed a brass swivel gun blunderbuss during the 1840s for the fighting top of ships of the line such as USS Constitution.

Although considered obsolete by the 1860s, M1814 blunderbusses were used by the USN during the Civil War to destroy Confederate naval mines.

The Brazilian Navy used swivel blunderbusses until the adoption of the Gatling Gun in the 1870s.

=== Later civilian use ===
Crude tripwire activated blunderbusses, known as alarm guns, spring guns and cemetery guns, were set up in graveyards and country estates to scare away poachers and resurrection men, and to alert the gamekeeper or sexton to their presence.

By the middle of the 19th century, the blunderbuss was replaced for military use by the carbine, but still found use by civilians as a defensive firearm.

Blunderbusses were used by rebels during the War of Canudos. After modern rifles were captured they remained in use in some roles. Blunderbuss shots were used by the rebels to signal commands at long distances where whistles could not be heard.

== See also ==
- Coach gun
- Combat shotgun
- Musketoon
- Riot shotgun
- Short-barrelled shotgun

== Sources ==
- Fronsberger, Leonhardt (1596). Von Kayserlichem Kriegsrechten [On Imperial Laws of War] (in German) (CLXVII, CLXIIII, CCLXVI ed.). Frankfurt: Feyrabend. Archived from the original on 31 May 2022.
- Peterson, Harold L. (13 May 2021). Mattern, Steve (ed.). Arms and Armor of the Pilgrims, 1620-1692. Project Gutenberg. ISBN 9783985312368.
