= Horseman's pick =

Weapon used during the Middle Ages

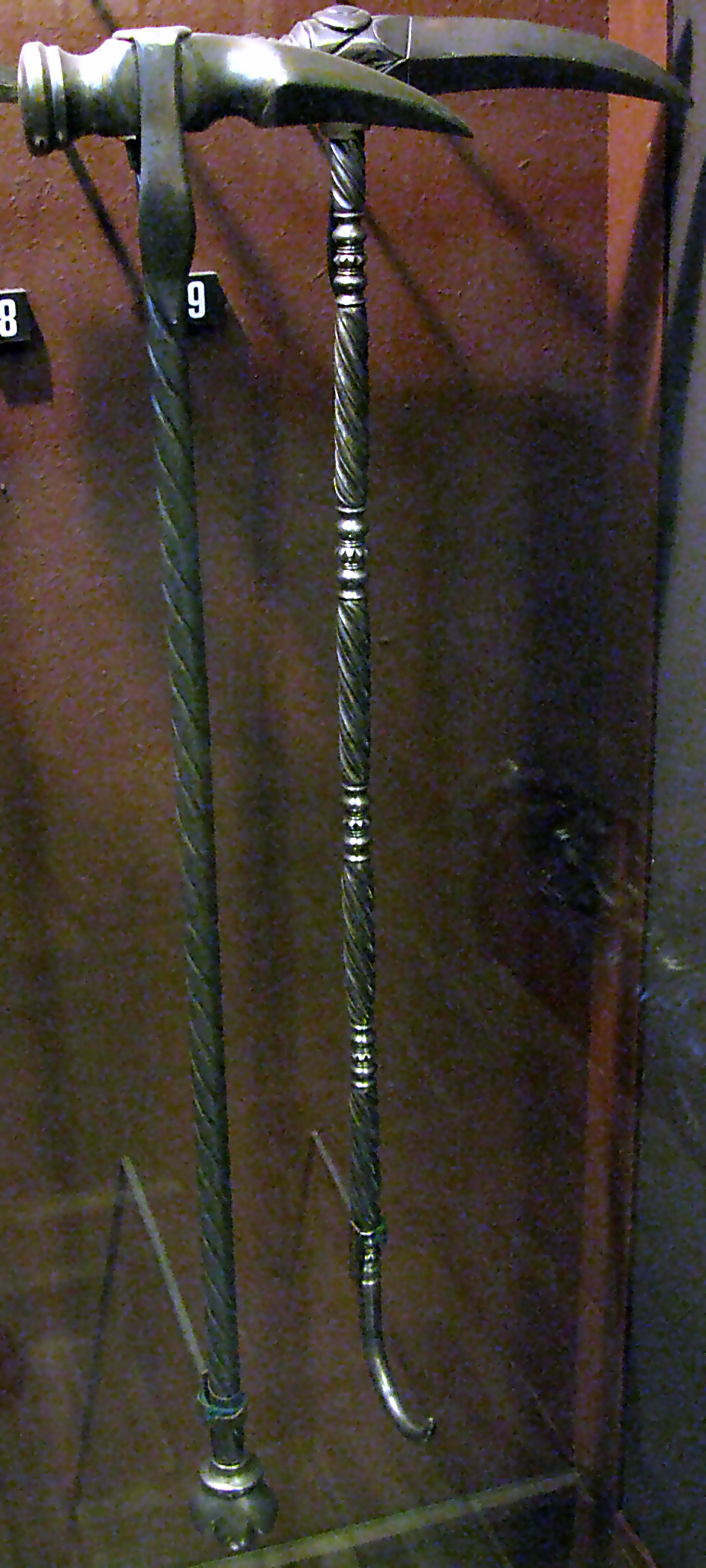
Polish horseman's picks from the 17th century

The horseman's pick is a weapon of Middle Eastern origin used by cavalry during the Middle Ages in Europe and West Asia. It is a type of war hammer that has a very long spike on the reverse of the hammer head. Usually, this spike is slightly curved downwards, much like a miner's pickaxe. The term is sometimes used interchangeably with war hammer. A metal-made horseman's pick called "nadziak" was one of the main weapons of the famous Polish Winged Hussars. A weapon of late make, the horseman's pick was developed by the English and used by billmen. It was used with great success during the Hundred Years' War. A use of the horseman's pick was to tear men from their mounts.

The horseman's pick was often used as a means to penetrate thick plate armour or mail which the standard sword could not. However, a number of drawbacks limited the weapon's effectiveness. Its relative heaviness made it unwieldy and, thus, easily avoided. The injury caused by the weapon was also small and rarely immediately fatal. Additionally, if swung too hard, the weapon often became embedded in the victim or their armour, making retrieval difficult.

== Gallery ==
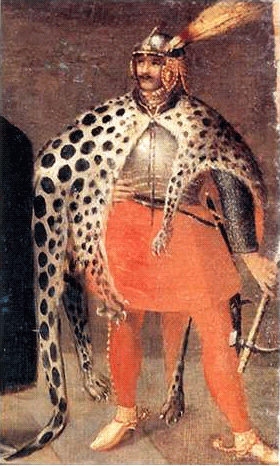
A Polish hussar companion with a nadziak (17th century)

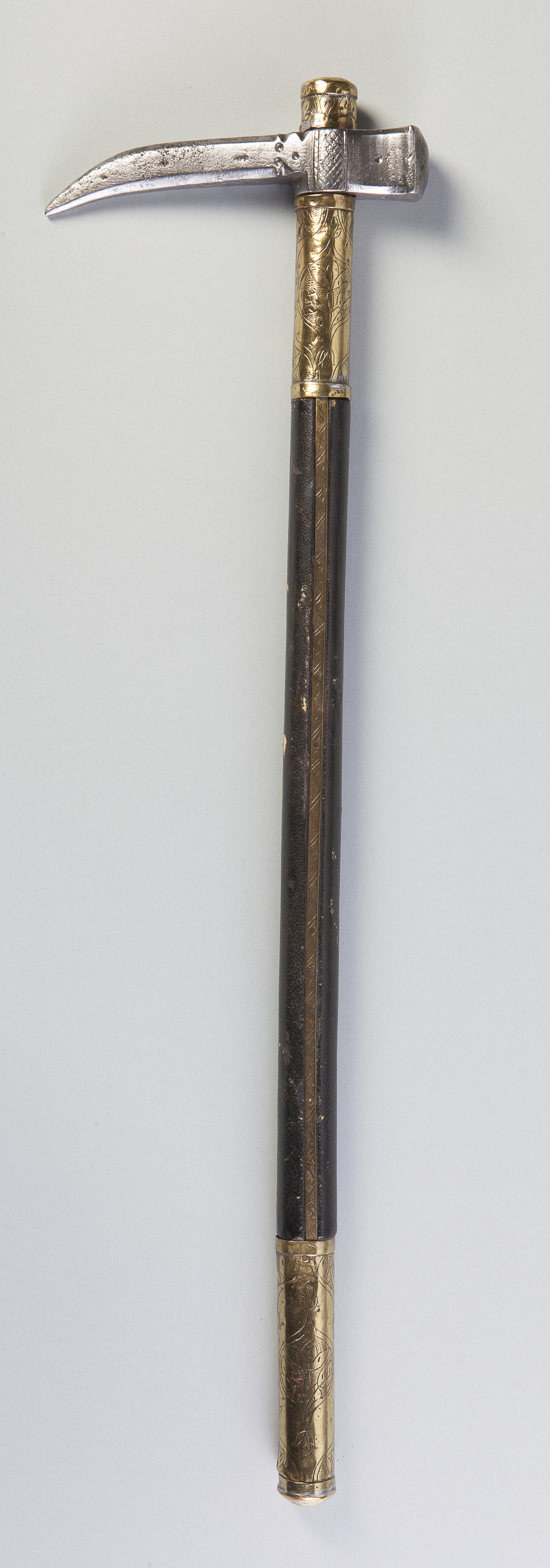
Ottoman horseman’s pick (18th century, collection of the National Museum in Kraków

== See also ==
- War hammer
- Shepherd's axe
- Obuch
- Sagaris
