= Robert Barret =

Robert Barret (fl. 1600) was a British military writer, and poet.

== Life ==
He spent much of his life in the profession of arms among the French, Dutch, Italians, and Spaniards. Before 1598, he had "retyred to a rustique lyfe," and addressed himself to literature.

His first work was entitled The Theorike and Practike of Modern Warres. Discourses in Dialogue wise, wherein is disclosed the neglect of Martiall discipline: the inconvenience thereof, and more to like effect. It was published in London in 1598, with two dedicatory addresses, the one to the Earl of Pembroke and the other to his son William, Lord Herbert of Cardiff, for whose instruction the book was professedly prepared. A prefatory poem is signed "William Sa——".Barret deals largely with military tactics, and many interesting diagrams may be found among his pages.

Some eight years later he completed a more ambitious production. After three years' labour he finished, "26 March, anno 1606," the longest epic poem in the language, numbering more than 68,000 lines. The work never found a publisher, and is still extant in a unique manuscript. It was entitled The Sacred Warr. An History conteyning the Christian Conquest of the Holy Land by Godfrey de Buillion Duke of Lorraine, and sundrye other Illustrious Christian Heroes. Their Lyues, Acts, and Gouernments even untill Jherusalem's Lamentable Reprieze by Saladdin, Ægypts Calyph and Sultan, with continuations down to 1588.

The authorities cited are "the chronicles of William Archbishoppe of Tyrus, the Protoscribe of Palestine, of Basilius Johannes Heraldius and sundry other." The poem is in alternate rhymes; the language is stilted and affected and contains many newly coined words. In an address to the reader, Barret apologises for intermixing "so true and grave an history with Poetical fictions, phrases, narrations, digressions, reprizes, ligations," and so forth; but Sallust and Guillaume de Salluste Du Bartas have been his models.

The work is in thirty-two books, and at its close are An Exhortacion Elegiacall to all European Christians against the Turks, in verse, and an account in prose of the Military Offices of the Turkish Empery. The completed volume bears date 1613. The manuscript at one time belonged to Robert Southey; it subsequently passed into the Corser Library, and thence into the possession of James Crossley of Manchester.

William Shakespeare, according to Chalmers, caricatured Barret as Parolles in All's well that ends well. But the statement is purely conjectural. Parolles is spoken of as "the gallant militarist—that was his own phrase—that had the whole theoric of war in the knot of his scarf, and the practice in the chape of his dagger"—words which may possibly allude to the title of Barret's military manual, but are in themselves hardly sufficient to establish a more definite connection between him and Parolles.
