= Phrygian =

Phrygian can refer to:

- Anything relating to the region of Phrygia
- Anything relating to the Phrygians, an ethnic group
- Phrygian language, their language
- Phrygian cap, once characteristic of the region
- Phrygian helmet, used historically in Thracian, Dacian, Classical and Hellenistic Greek armies, and later among Romans
- Phrygian mode in music
- A follower of Montanism, an early Christian movement in Phrygia
