= Volontaires de Saxe =

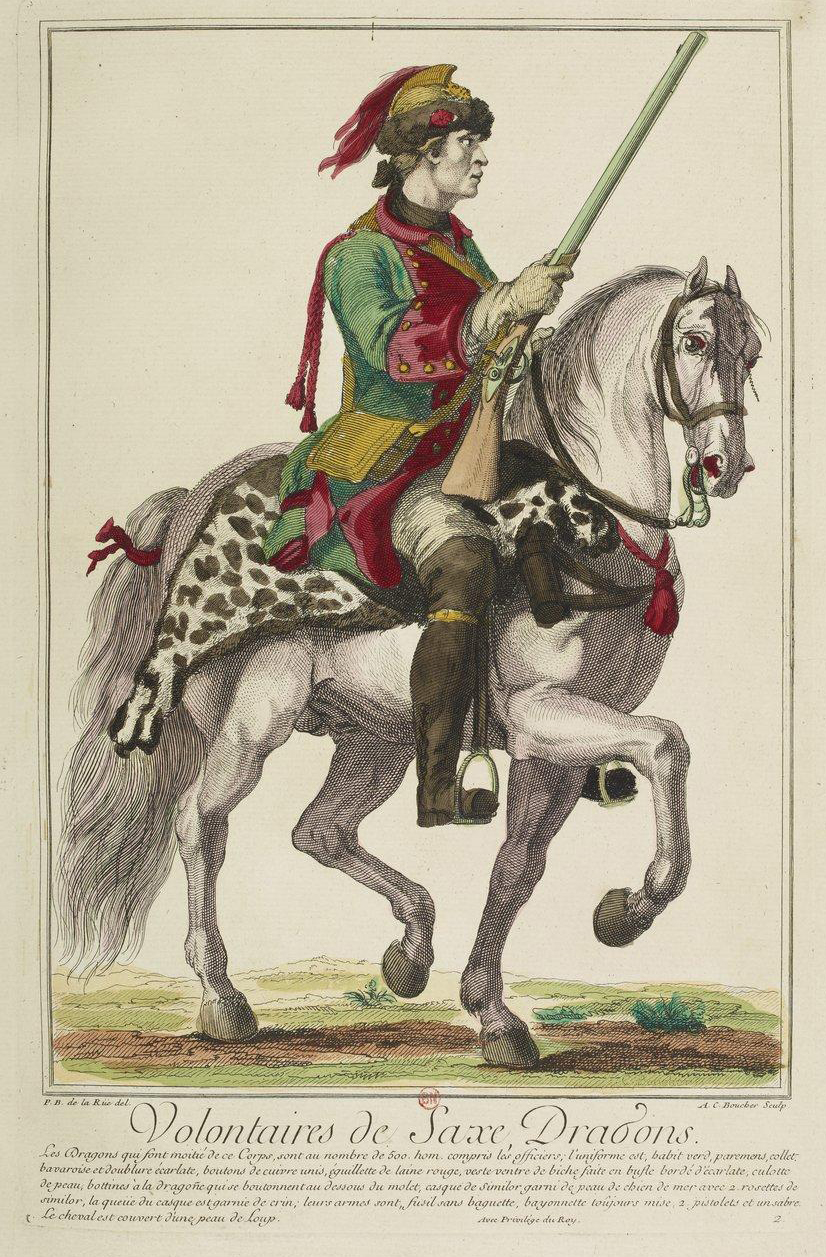
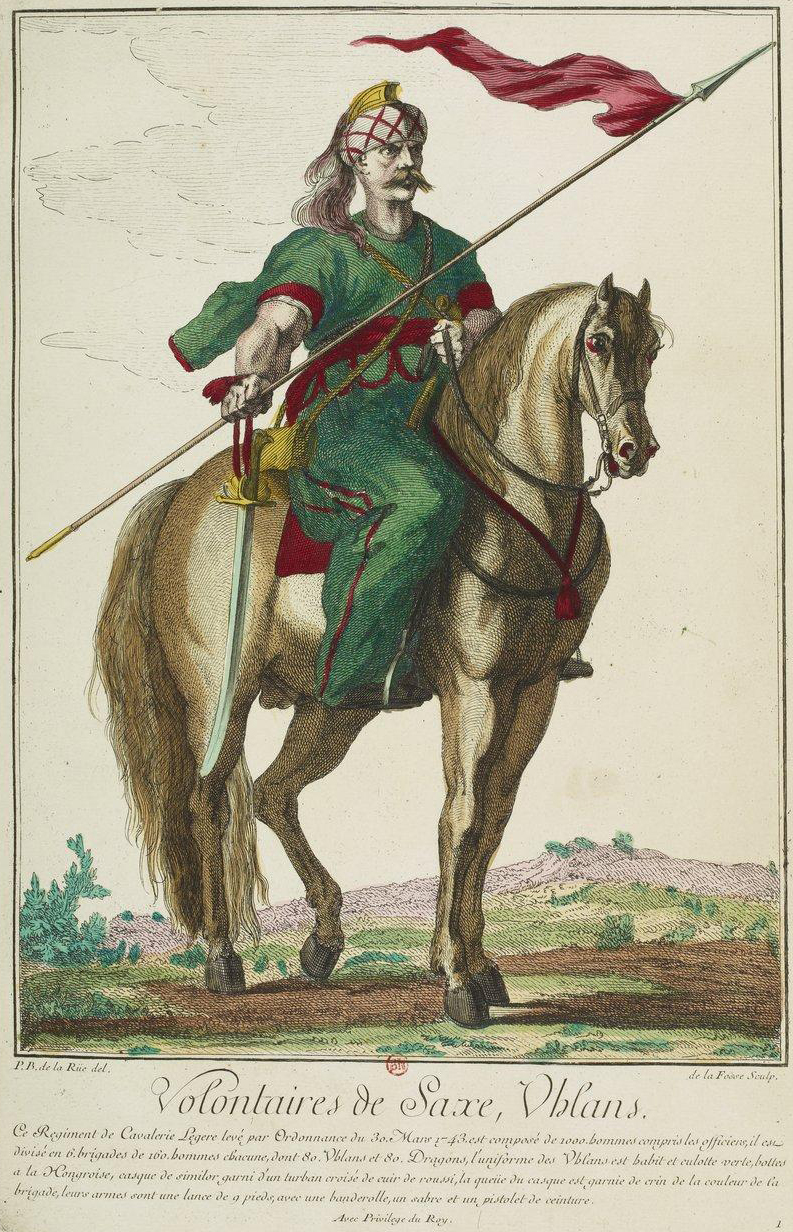
Left: de Saxe dragoon Right: de Saxe uhlan

The Volontaires de Saxe (also known as Volontaires du Maréchal de Saxe) were a military unit of cavalry troops recruited by French field marshal Maurice de Saxe. It consisted of dragoons in European military dress and uhlans (lancers) inspired by Turkish fashion. Both wore a messing helmet inspired by the ancient Phrygian helmet. A troops of lancers, composed of black men, guarded the Château de Chambord, his residence. After the death of de Saxe in 1750 the whole unit was turned into dragoons and eventually came to be known régiment de Schomberg.

The corps fought in the War of the Austrian Succession (1740–1748) and in the Seven Years' War (1756–1763).

== Sources ==
- Henri, comte de La Bassetière: Maurice de Saxe et ses Uhlands (1748-1750), dans Loire-et Cher historique, 15 mai 1893 (pp. 130-139) et 15 juin 1893 (pp. 162-178) (Bibl. de l’Institut catholique de Paris); nach: André Corvisier, L'armée française de la fin du XVIIe siècle au ministère de Choiseul, tome I, Paris 1964
- Liliane und Fred Funcken, Historische Uniformen, Bd. 2, München 1978
