= Secrete (helmet) =

Concealed helmet

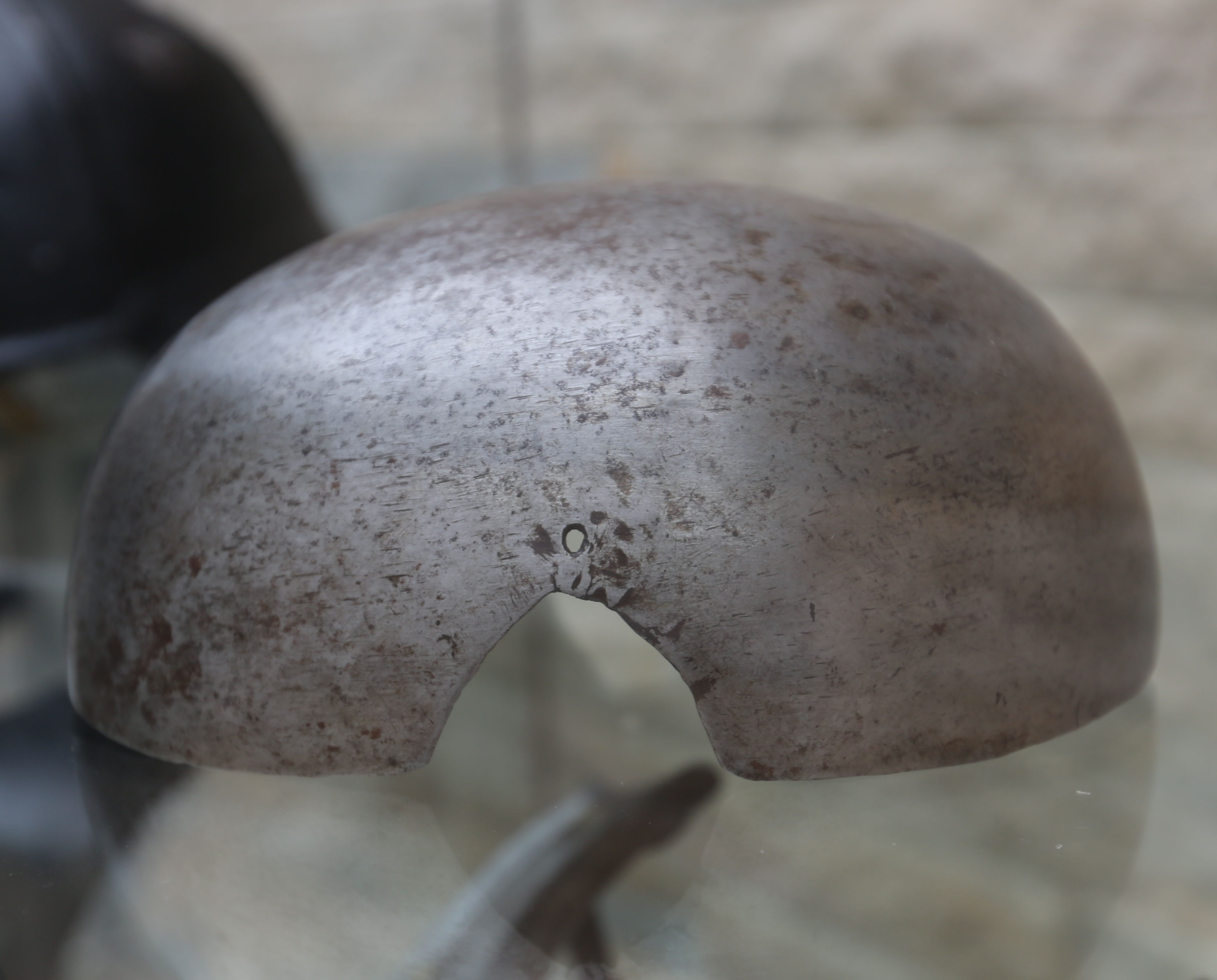
An example of a secrete

The secrete or secret, a French term adopted into English usage, was a type of helmet designed to be concealed beneath a hat.

== Usage ==
In the 17th century, cavalrymen, especially fashion-conscious members of the gentry or aristocracy, who wished to wear fashionable broad-brimmed felt hats, but also retain some level of protection for the head, would employ a hidden helmet called a secrete. This type of helmet could also be worn by civilians, including some of the judges at Charles I's trial, who believed that their safety was threatened. The existence of a large number of secrete helmets of a very similar type all stored together in the Tower of London suggests that they were occasionally issued to troops as a uniform piece of military equipment.

== Appearance ==
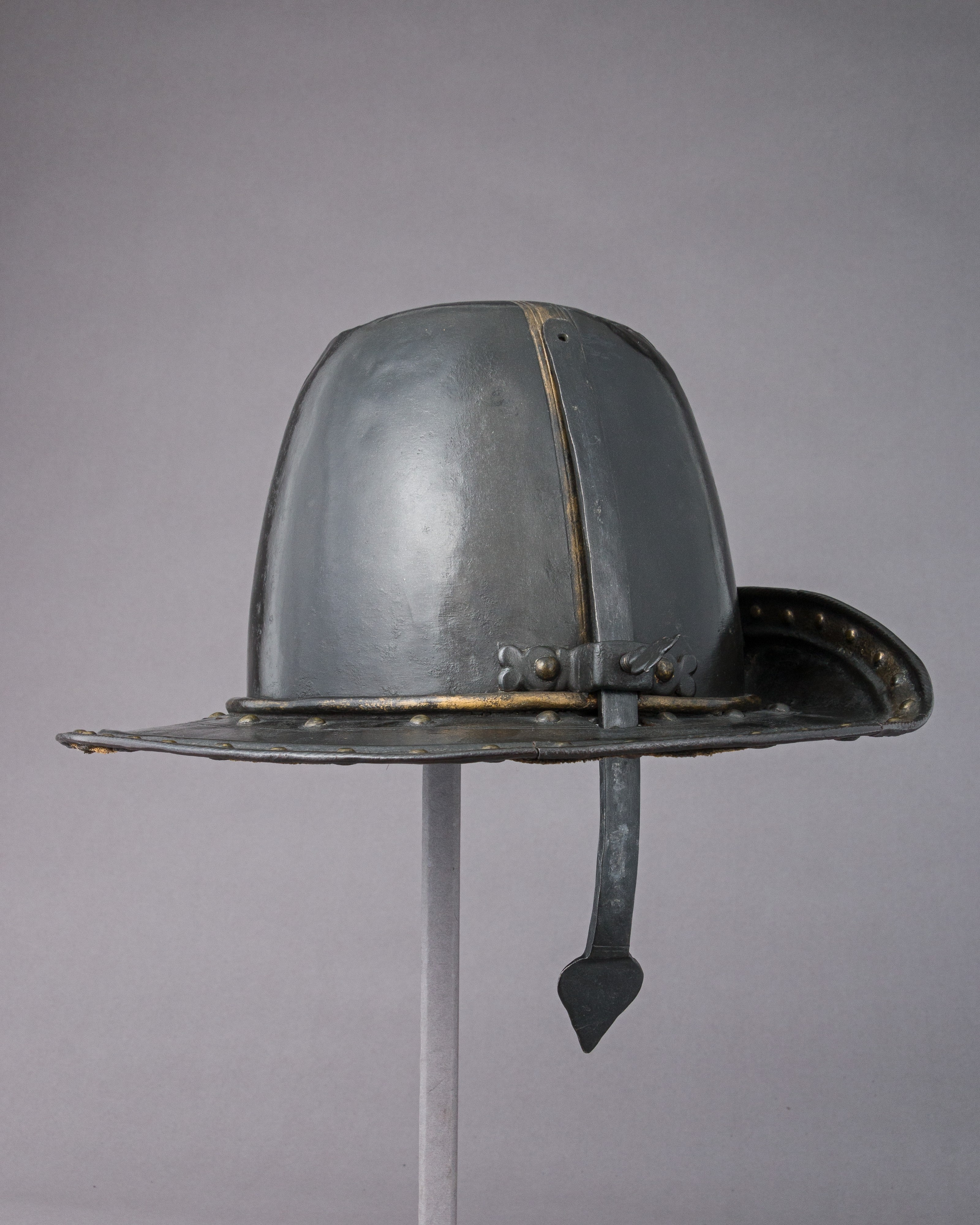
A 17th century hat-helmet

The secrete was usually a small skull-cap of iron or steel pierced around its rim. The piercing allowed it to be sewn into the inside of a hat. The secrete was then undetectable to any observer, but offered considerably more protection from edged weapons than could a felt hat alone. Many different designs were used, some had solid domes, others were ring-shaped with a scalloped lower edge, presumably to save weight. A few exceptional examples had a folding cage of bars, which could be drawn down to afford protection to the face when in action. A further type of head protection which could be considered to fall under the same category, as it was intended to deceive the observer and mimic civilian headgear, was an entire broad-brimmed hat made of iron or steel. Such hat-helmets were either covered in cloth, or blackened and given a dulled finish so as to resemble felt. King Charles I of England is recorded as possessing such a helmet.
