= Phrygian helmet =

Ancient Greek helmet with a high, curved apex

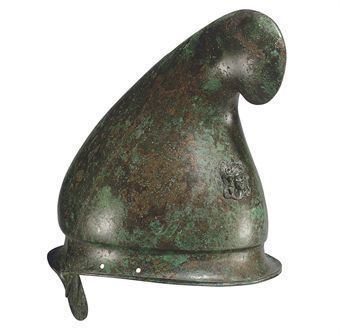
Phrygian helmet from the Musée d'Art Classique de Mougins; the front of the skull is ornamented with an appliqué head of the goddess Athena, the helmet is missing its original cheekpieces.

The Phrygian helmet, also known as the Thracian helmet, was a type of helmet that originated in ancient Greece, towards the close of the classical period and was used throughout the Hellenistic world until well into the period of the Roman Republic. Widely used by Greek, Macedonian, Diadochi, Italic peoples, Etruscans, Thracian, Phrygian and Dacian warriors throughout the Hellenistic and Roman republican period and by some ethnicities into Roman imperial times.

== Characteristics ==
The various names given to this type of helmet are derived from its shape, in particular the high and forward inclined apex, in which it resembles the soft caps (of textile or of leather, sometimes retaining the fur) habitually worn by Phrygian and Thracian peoples. These geographical names do not refer to the origins of the helmet itself and are a modern naming convention. The helmet was developed after the Greeks became familiar with the Thracian cap. The shape of the Boeotian helmet was also based on a type of soft hat, in this case the Greek petasos, a brimmed hat. Like the vast majority of helmets of Greek origin, Thracian and Phrygian helmets were made of bronze. The skull of the helmet was usually raised from a single sheet of bronze, though the forward-pointing apex was sometimes made separately and riveted to the skull. The skull was often drawn out into a peak at the front, this shaded the wearer's eyes and offered protection to the upper part of the face from downward blows. The face was further protected by large cheekpieces, made separately from the skullpiece. Sometimes these cheekpieces were so large that they met in the centre leaving a gap for the nose and eyes. When constructed in this manner they would have embossed and engraved decoration to mimic a beard and moustache.

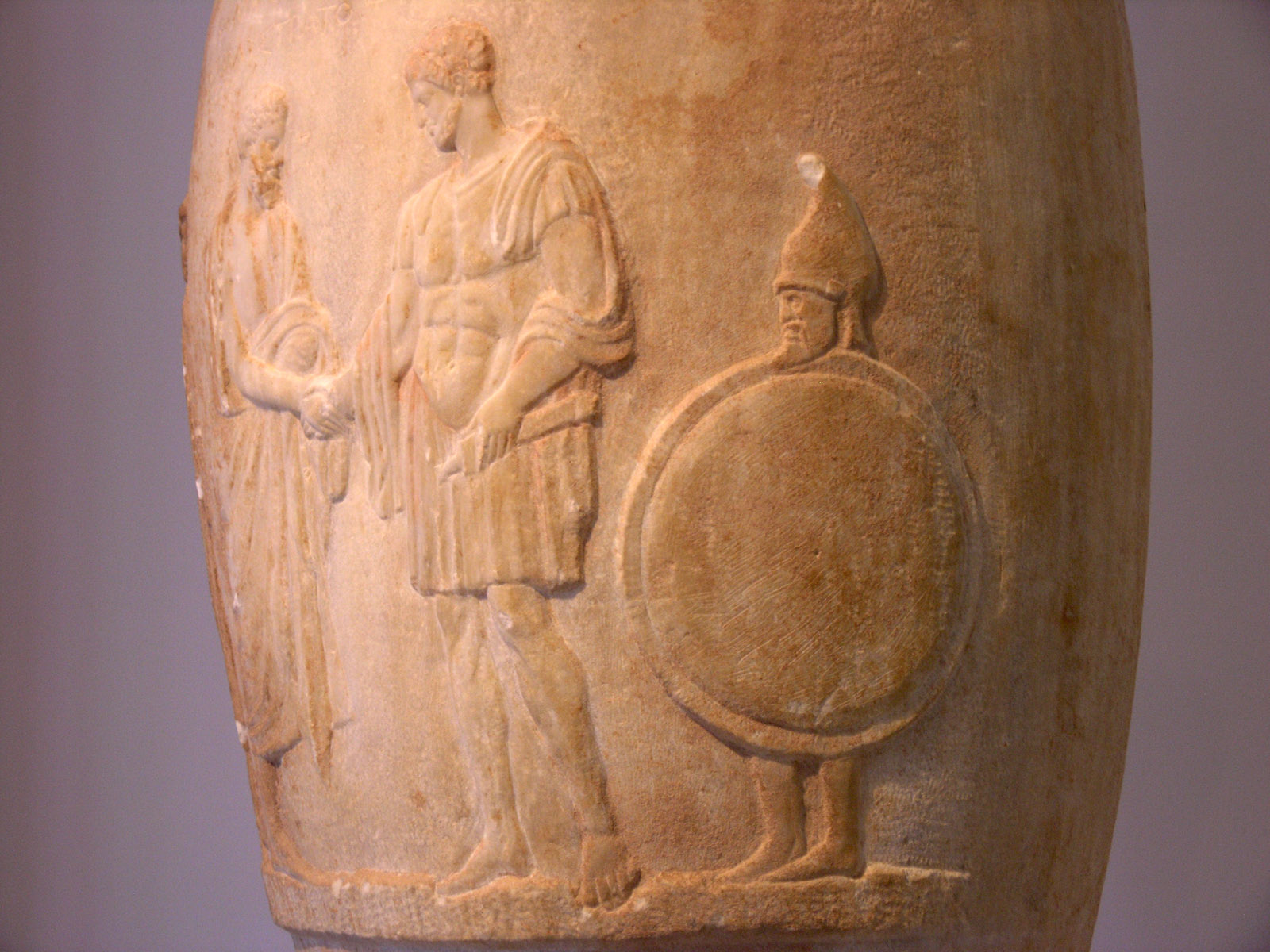
Funerary loutrophoros; on the right, a young Slave carries the shield of his Athenian master, 380–370 BC

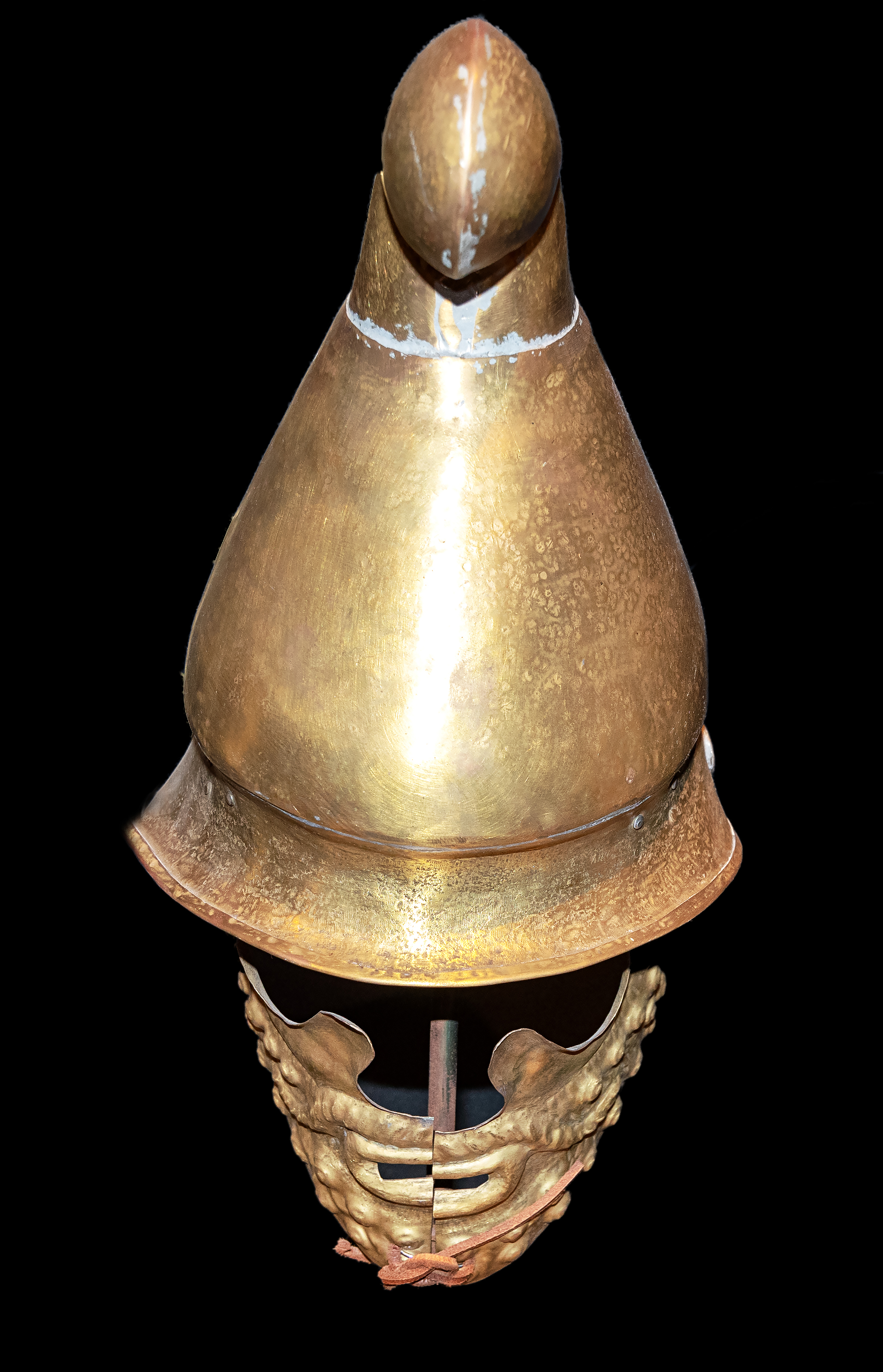
Modern reproduction of a Phrygian helmet with large cheekpieces decorated to resemble a beard

== Use ==
The Phrygian helmet was worn by Macedonian cavalry in King Philip's day, but his son, Alexander, is said to have preferred the open-faced Boeotian helmet for his cavalry, as recommended by Xenophon. The royal burial in the Vergina Tomb contained a helmet which was a variation on the Phrygian type, exceptionally made of iron, this would support its use by cavalry. The Phrygian helmet is prominently worn in representations of the infantry of Alexander the Great's army, such on the contemporary Alexander sarcophagus. The Phrygian helmet was in prominent use at the end of Greece's classical era and into the Hellenistic period, replacing the earlier 'Corinthian' type from the 5th century BC. (Note: The naming conventions and typology of ancient helmets are largely of modern origin and do not reflect contemporary usage (Connolly 1998, p. 60: "Terms such as 'Illyrian' and 'Attic' are used in archaeology for convenience to denote a particular type of helmet and do not imply its origin."))

== Gallery ==
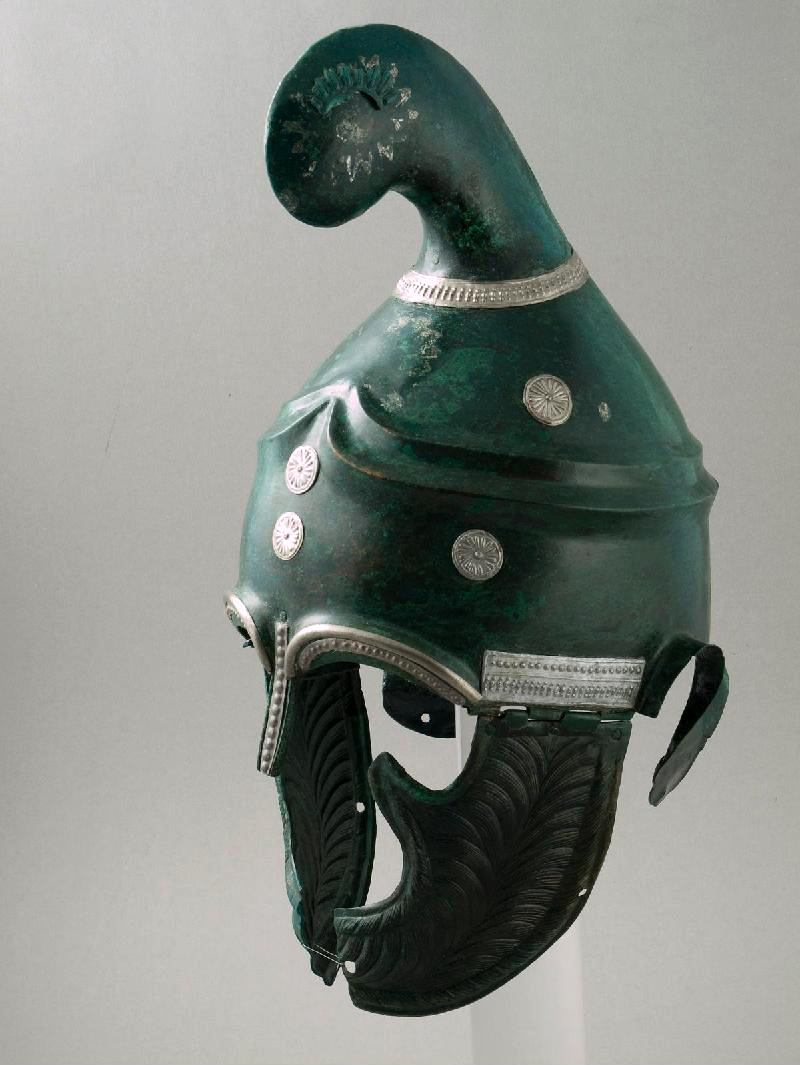
Thracian helmet from the village of Pletena, unusually possessing a nasal instead of the typical peak.

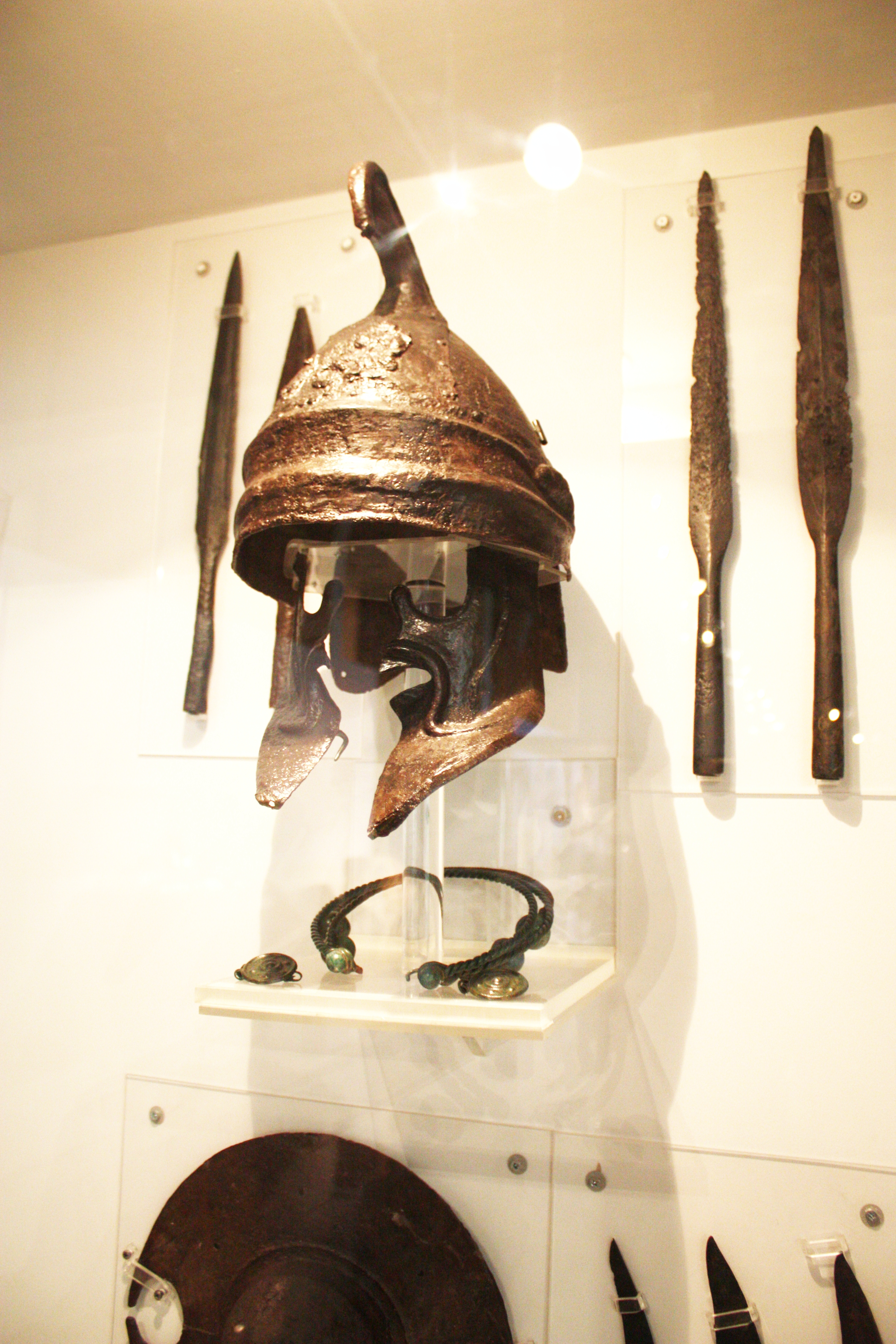
Thracian helmet with large cheekpieces, National History Museum of Bulgaria

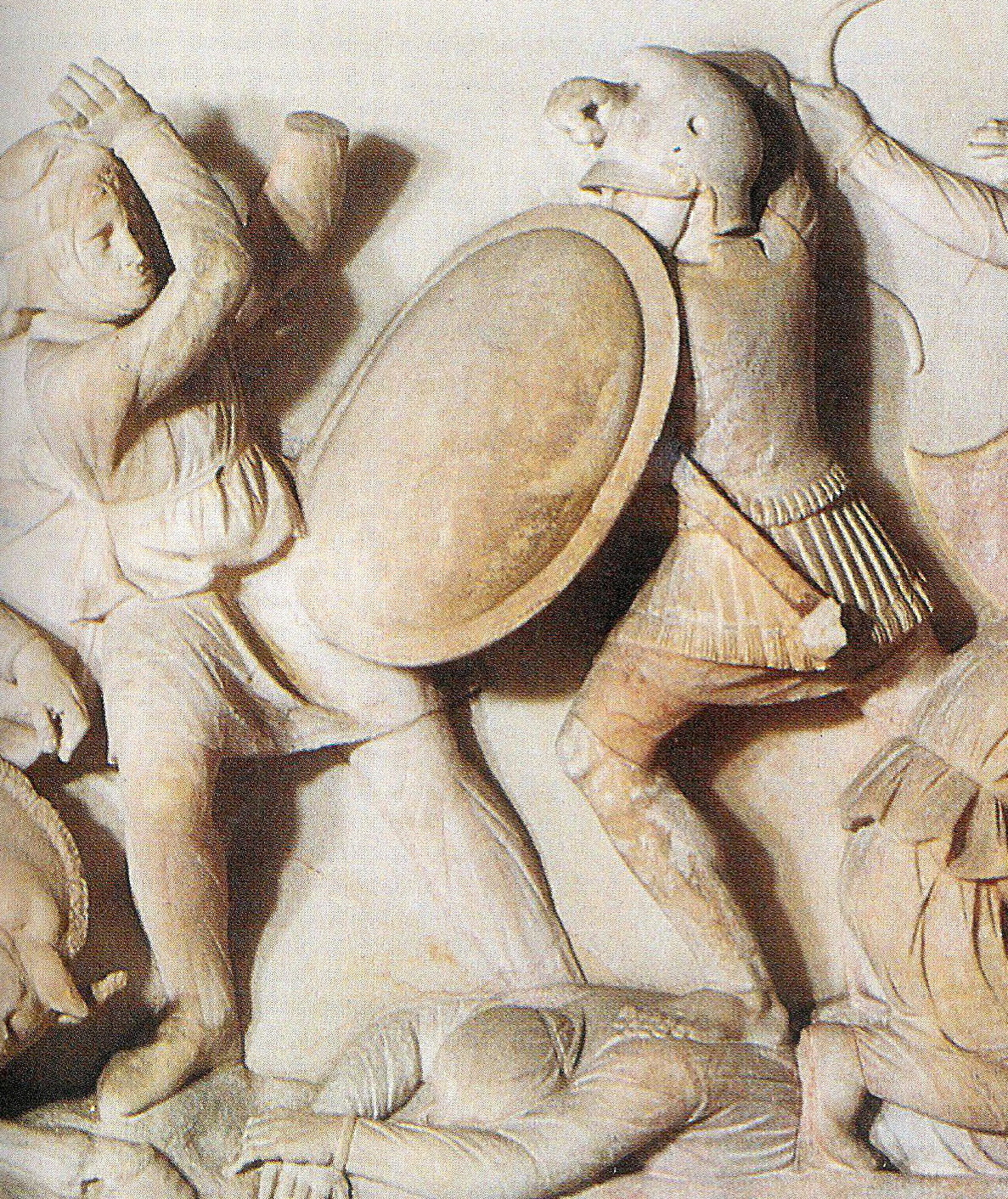
Ancient depiction on the Alexander Sarcophagus of a Macedonian infantryman (right) equipped with a typical Phrygian/Thracian helmet with a peak.

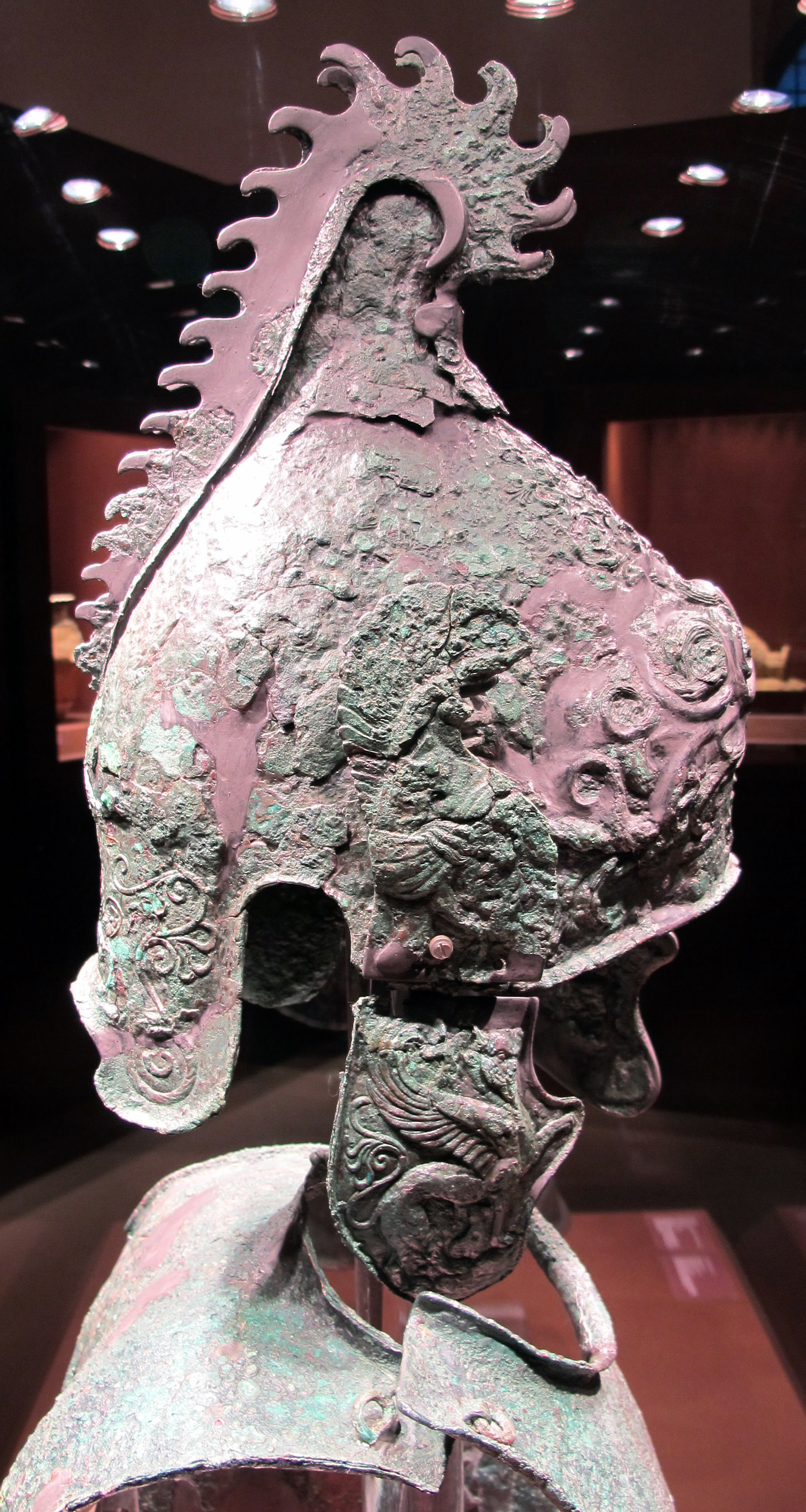
Helmet found in southern Italy, 4th century BC combining elements of the Phrygian and Attic types.

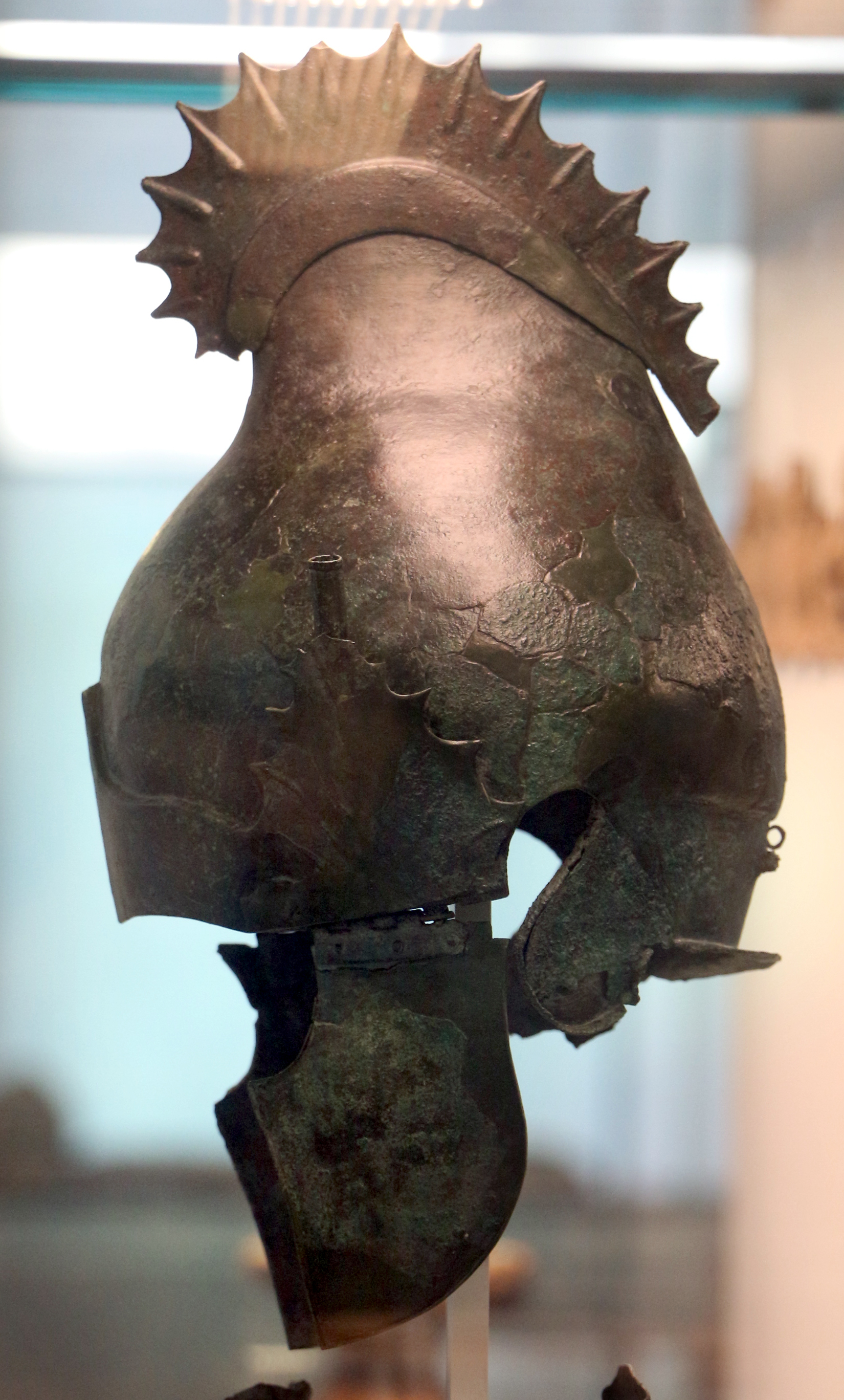
Phrygian/Attic Helmet with a comb from southern Italy (350 BC-300 BC)

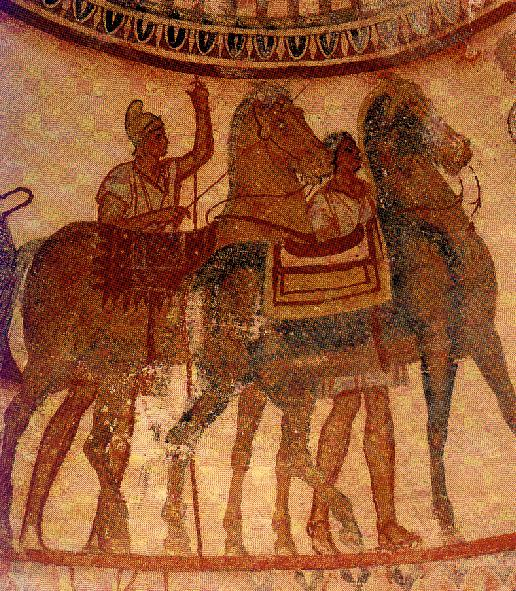
Horse herdsman from the Thracian Tomb of Kazanlak, 4th century BC
