= Chinese armour =

Type of armor

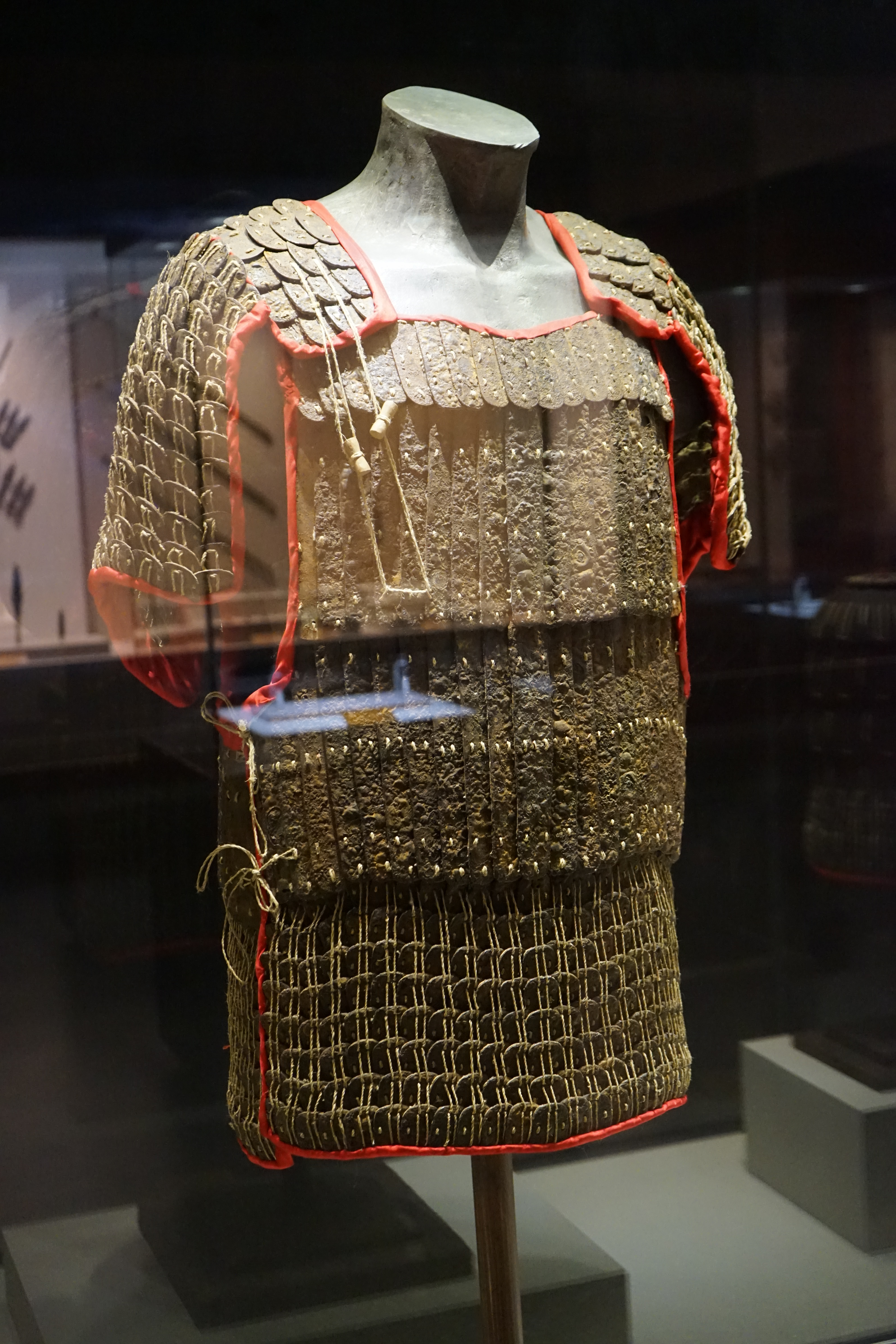
Han dynasty lamellar armour

Chinese armour is any of various types of protective gear used in China prior to the modern era. Lamellar armour predominated from the Warring States period (481 BC–221 BC) until the Ming dynasty (1368–1644). Before lamellar, personal armour in China consisted of animal parts such as rhinoceros hide, rawhide, and turtle shells. Lamellar armour was supplemented by other forms of armour such as scale since the Warring States period or earlier. Large metal plates worn over the chest and back, known as "cord and plaque" armour, was used from the Northern and Southern dynasties (420–589) to the Tang dynasty (618–907). Evidence of mail and mountain pattern armour started appearing from the Tang dynasty onward, although they never supplanted lamellar as the primary type of body armour. Chain mail had been known since the Han dynasty (202 BC – 220 AD), but did not see widespread production. Mail was used infrequently and may have been seen as "exotic foreign armor" used to display the wealth of rich officers and soldiers. During the Ming dynasty (1368–1644), brigandine began to supplant lamellar armour and was used to a great degree into the Qing dynasty (1644–1912). By the 19th century most Qing armour, which was of the brigandine type, were purely ceremonial, having kept the outer studs for aesthetic purposes, and omitted the protective metal plates.

== Ancient armour ==
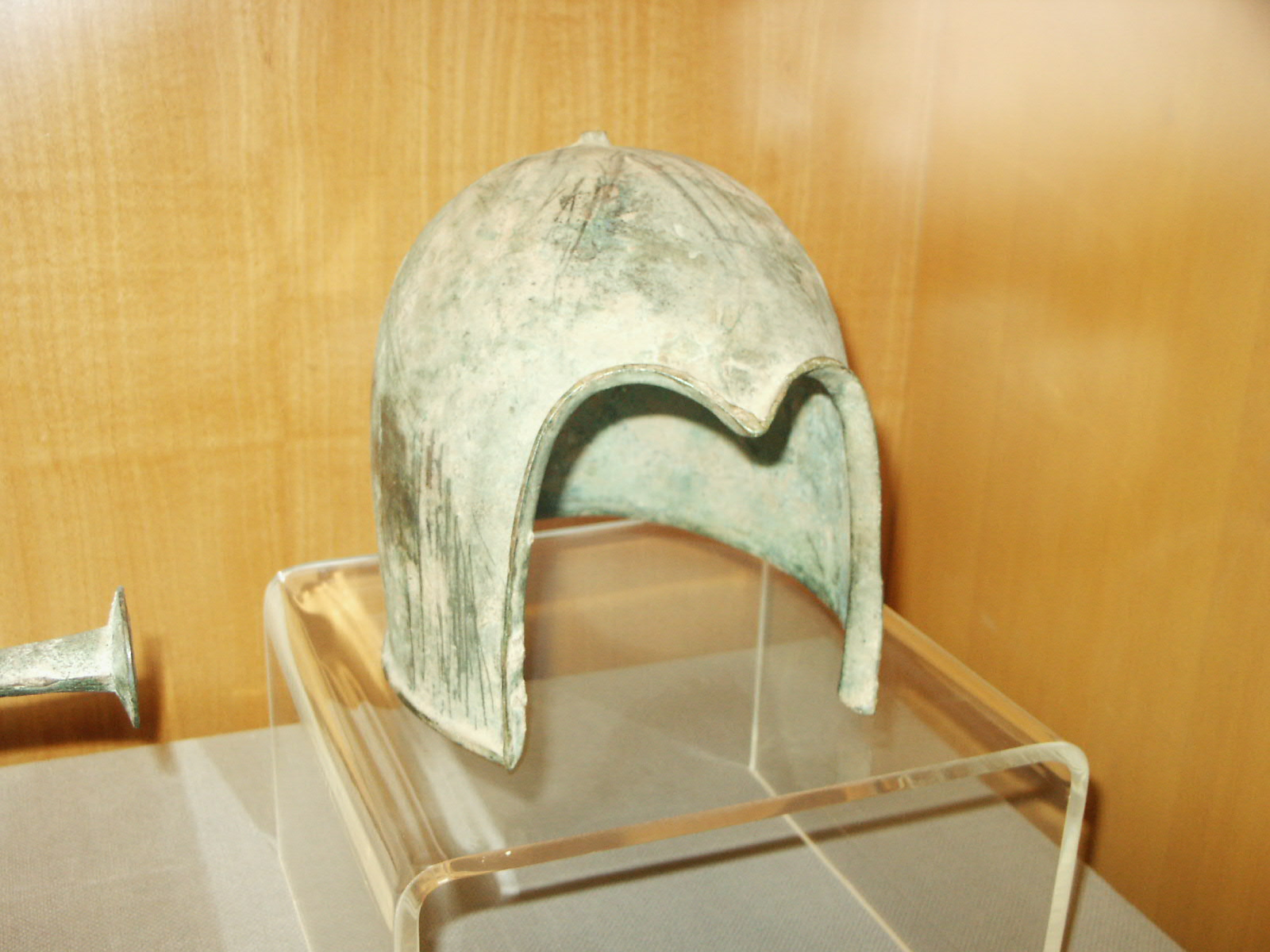
Early Warring States bronze helmet

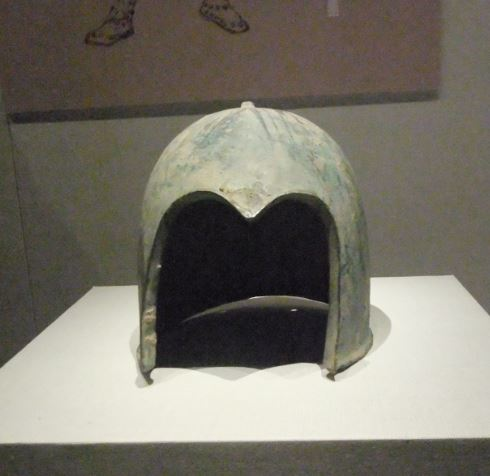
Warring States bronze helmet

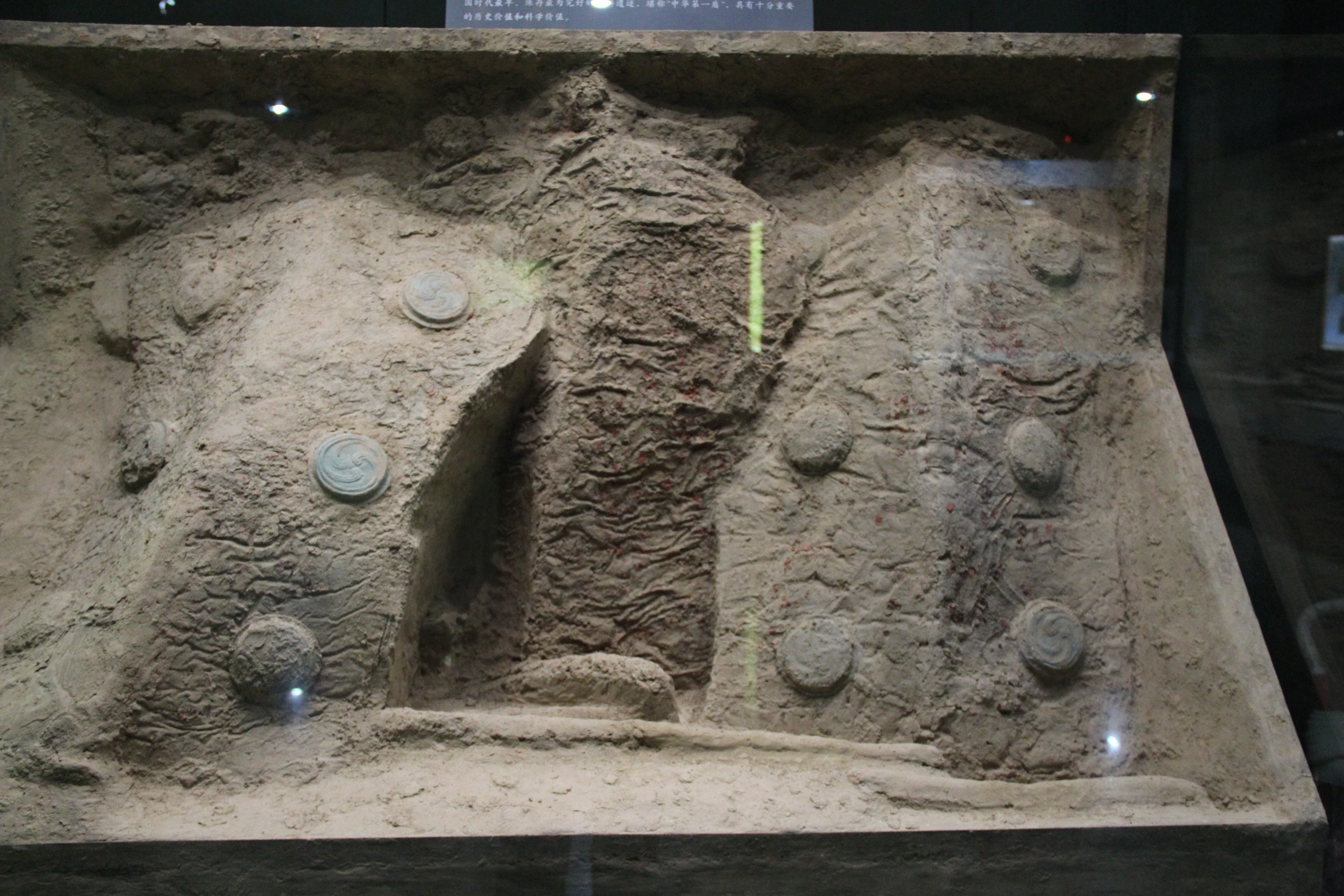
Western Zhou period shields from a tomb of the state of Guo

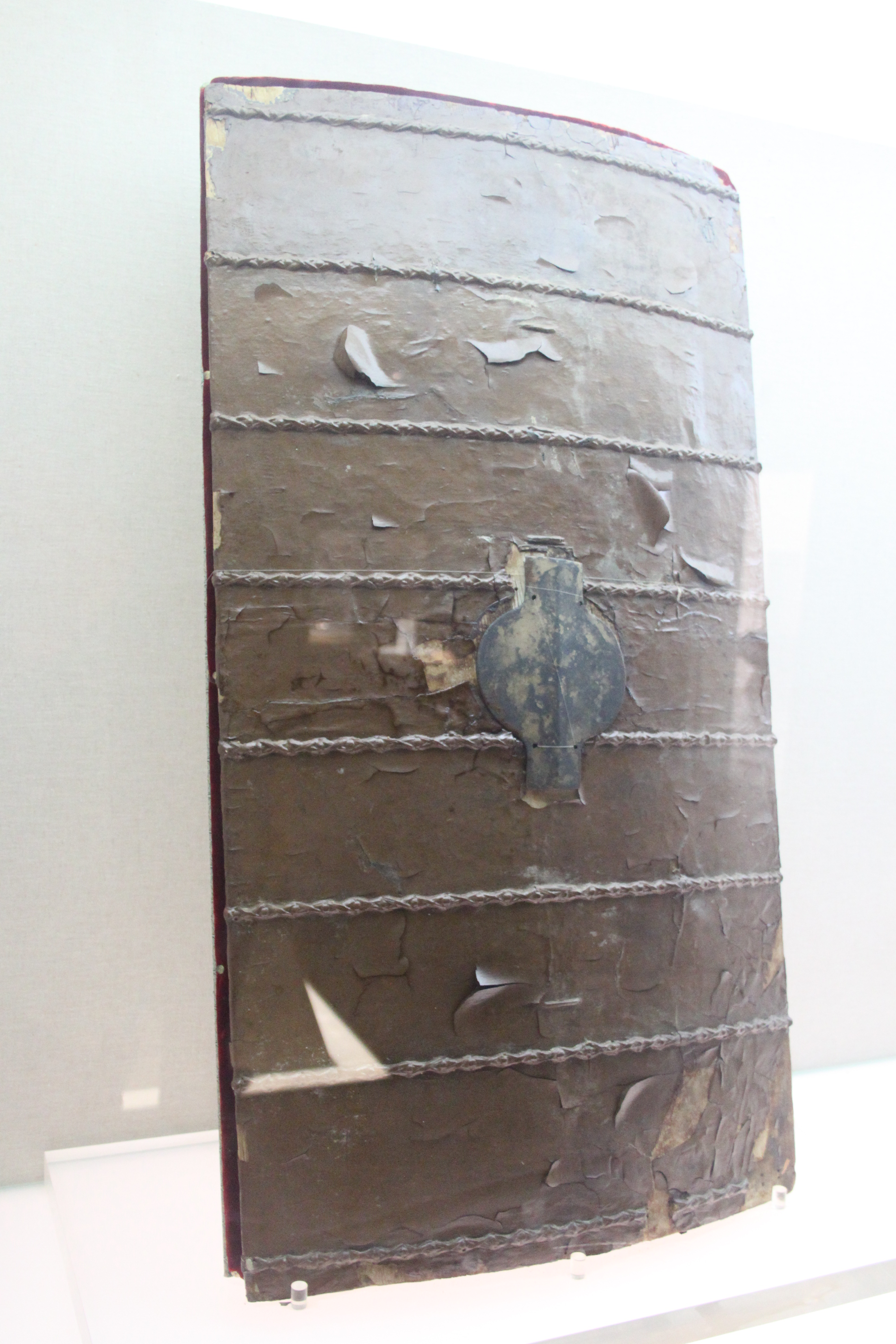
Warring States rectangular shield (91.8cm tall, 49.6cm wide), from the state of Chu

=== Shang dynasty (c. 1600 BC–c. 1046 BC) ===
The earliest archaeological evidence of armor in China dates to the Shang dynasty. These were either breastplates made of shell tied together or a one-piece rawhide or [partially tanned] leather breastplate. Helmets were made of bronze and often sported elaborate designs consisting of animal motifs. Armour was almost exclusively for nobles; regular folks had little to no protection and more commonly used a hide-covered shield made of wood or bamboo.

=== Zhou dynasty (c. 1046 BC–256 BC) ===
Armour in the Zhou dynasty consisted of either a sleeveless coat of rhinoceros or buffalo hide, or rawhide/leather scale armour. Helmets were largely similar to Shang predecessors but less ornate. Chariot horses were sometimes protected by tiger skins.

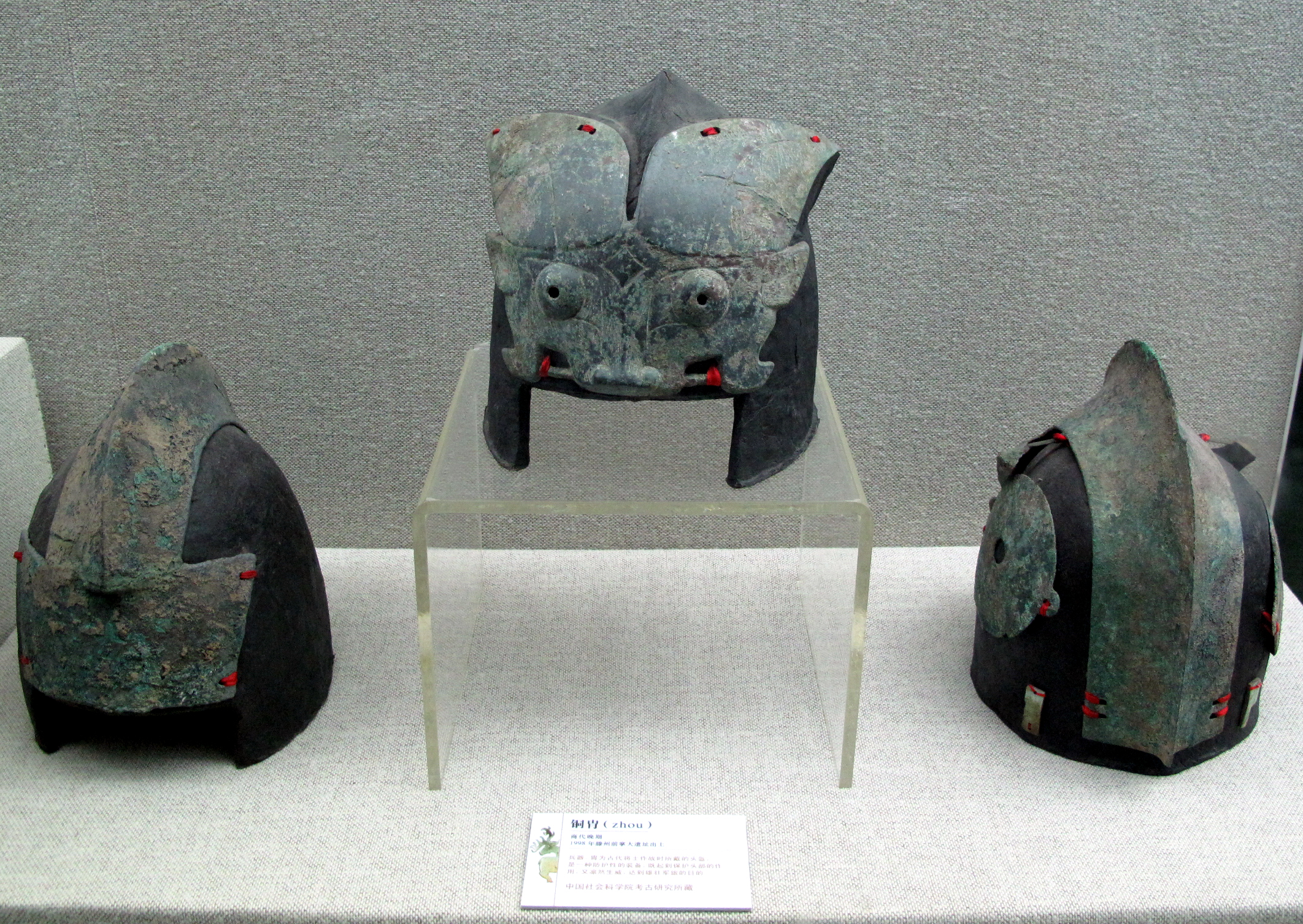
Shang dynasty helmet fittings (leather helmet no longer extant)

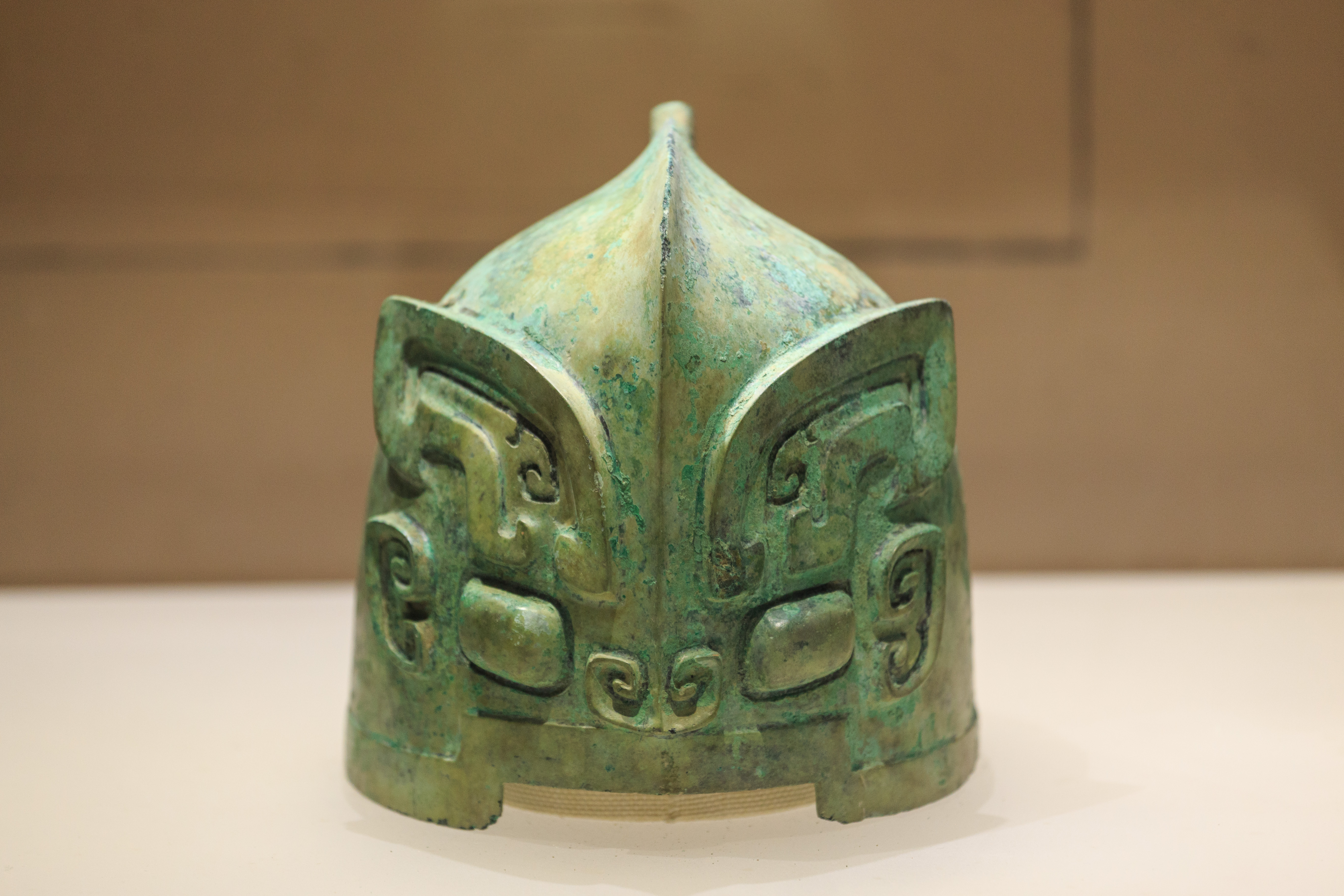
Shang dynasty bronze helmet with Taotie motif.

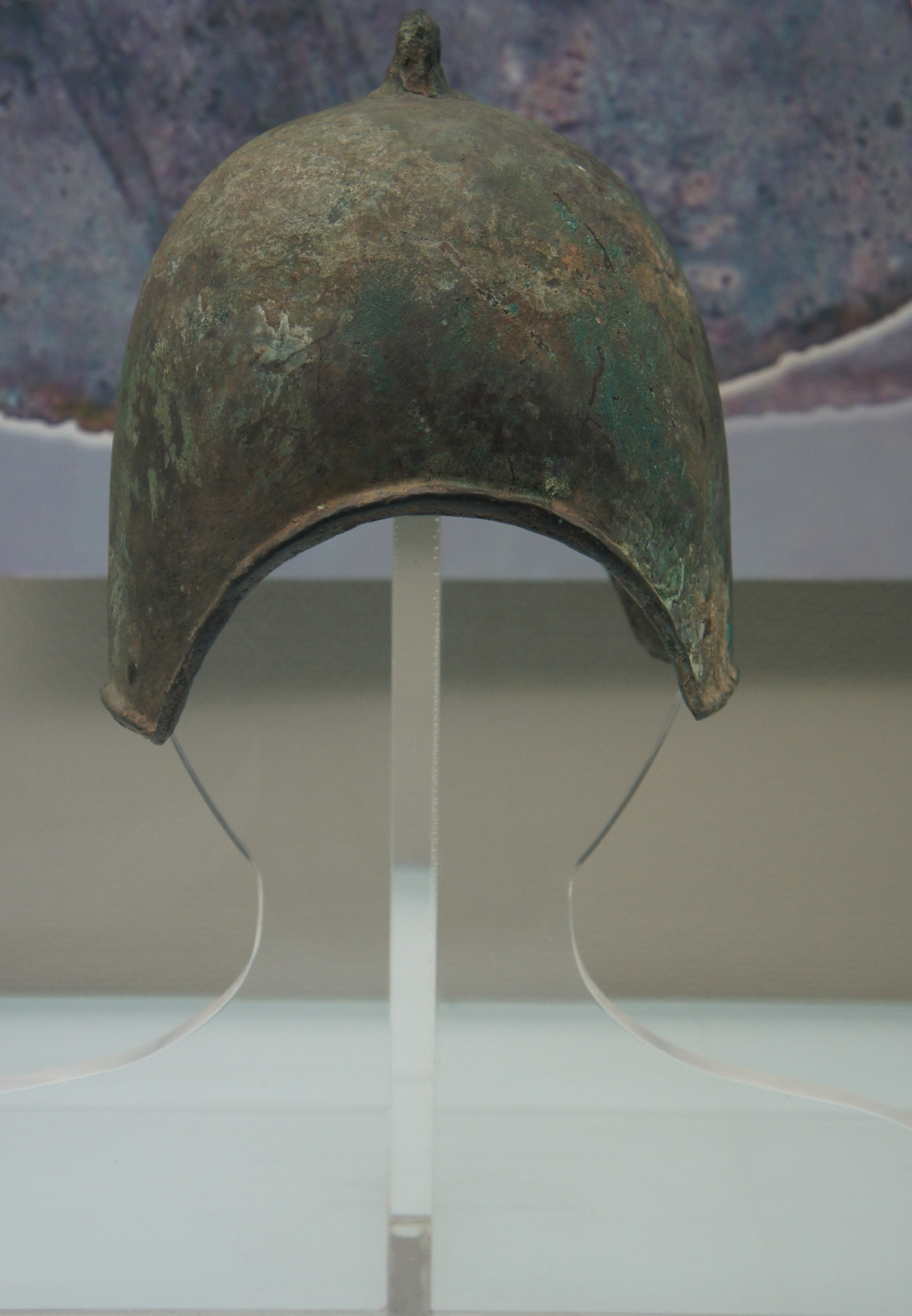
Shang dynasty bronze helmet

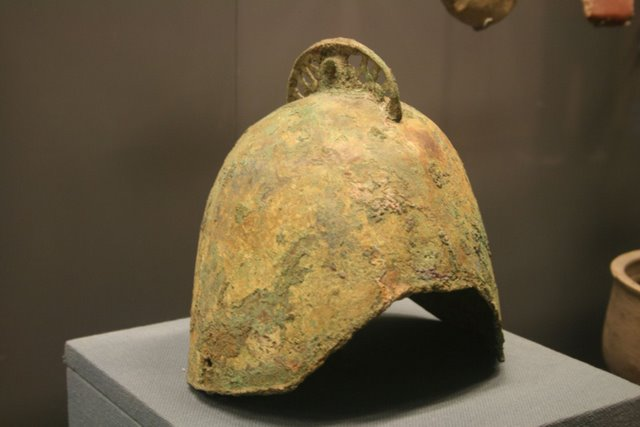
Western Zhou helmet

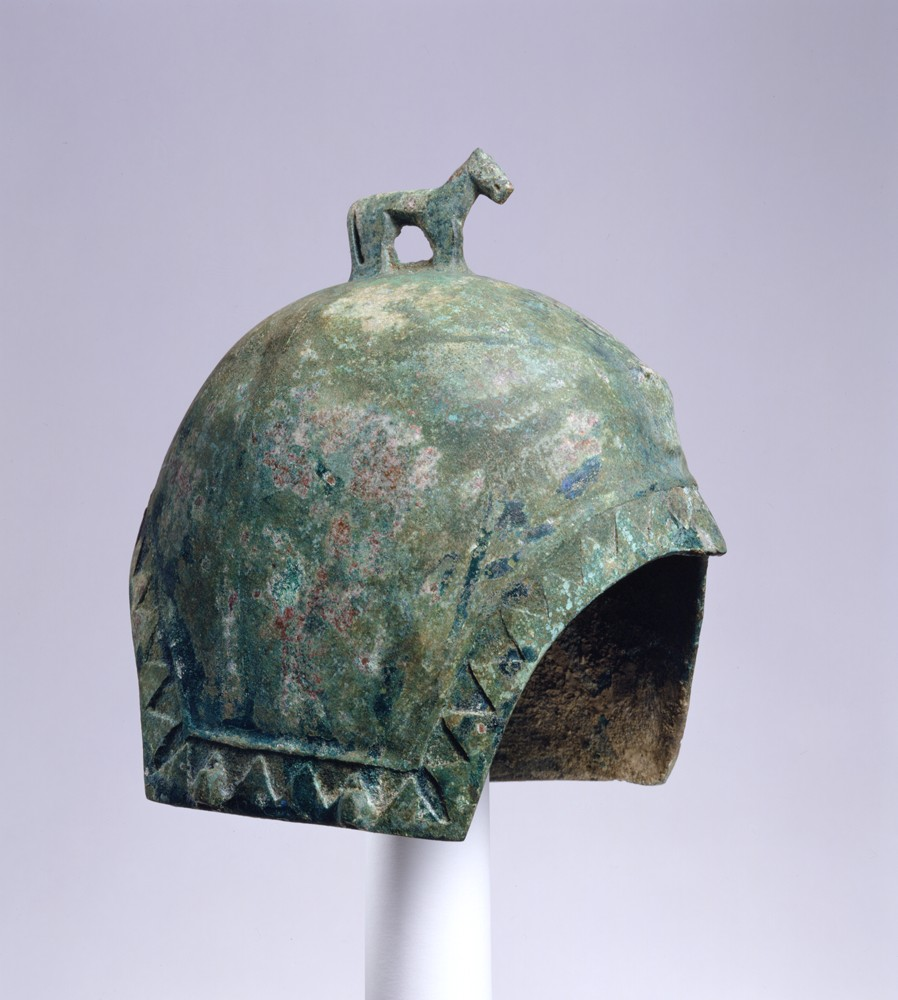
Zhou dynasty helmet

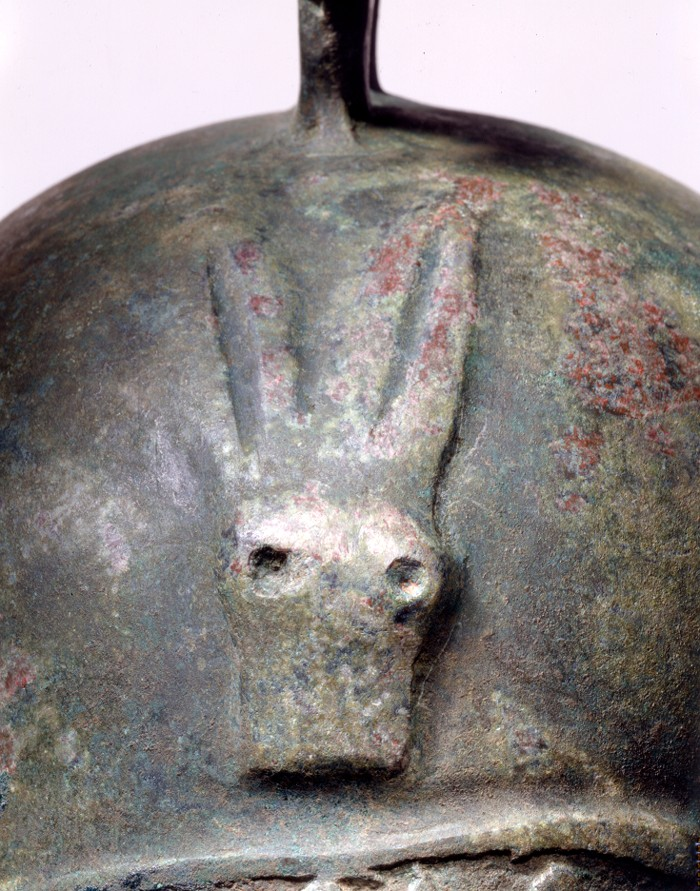
Helmet front

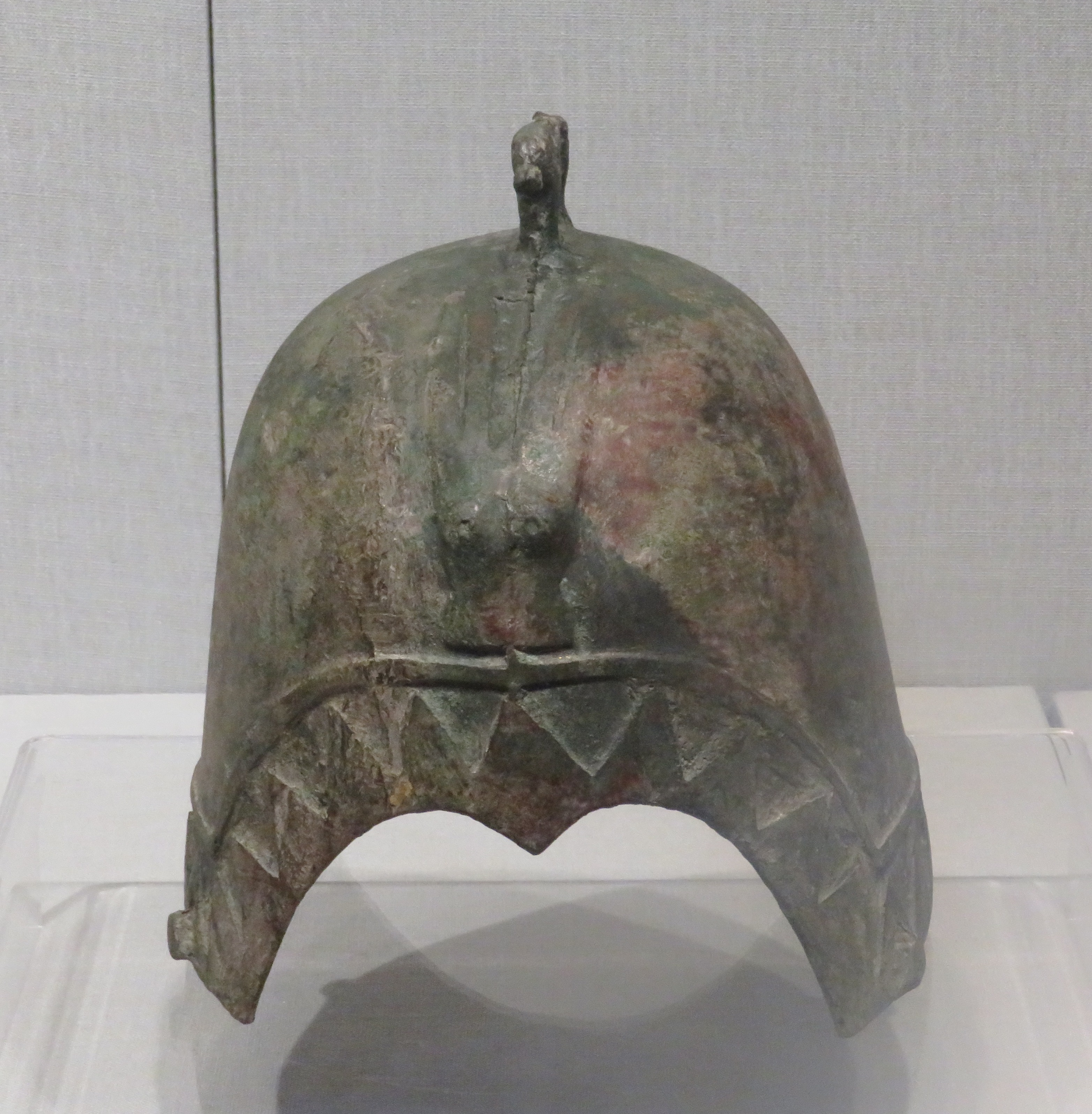
Warring States bronze helmet

=== Warring States (c. 475 BC–221 BC) ===
In the 4th century BC, rhinoceros armour was still used. In the following passage Guan Zhong advises Duke Huan of Qi to convert punishments to armour and weapons:

Ordain that serious crimes are to be redeemed with a suit of rhinoceros armour and one halberd, and minor crimes with a plaited rawhide/leather shield and one halberd. Misdemeanours are to be punished with [a fine of] a quota of metal [jin fen 金分], and doubtful cases are to be pardoned. A case should be delayed for investigation for three [days] without allowing arguments or judgements; [by the time] the case is judged [the subject will have produced] one bundle of arrows. Good metal [mei jin 美金] should be cast into swords and halberd[-heads] and tested on dogs and horses, while poorer metal [e jin 惡金] should be cast into agricultural implements and tested on earth.

— Guan Zhong

By the late Warring States period in the 3rd century BC, iron weapons and armour had come into widespread use.

==== Lamellar armour ====
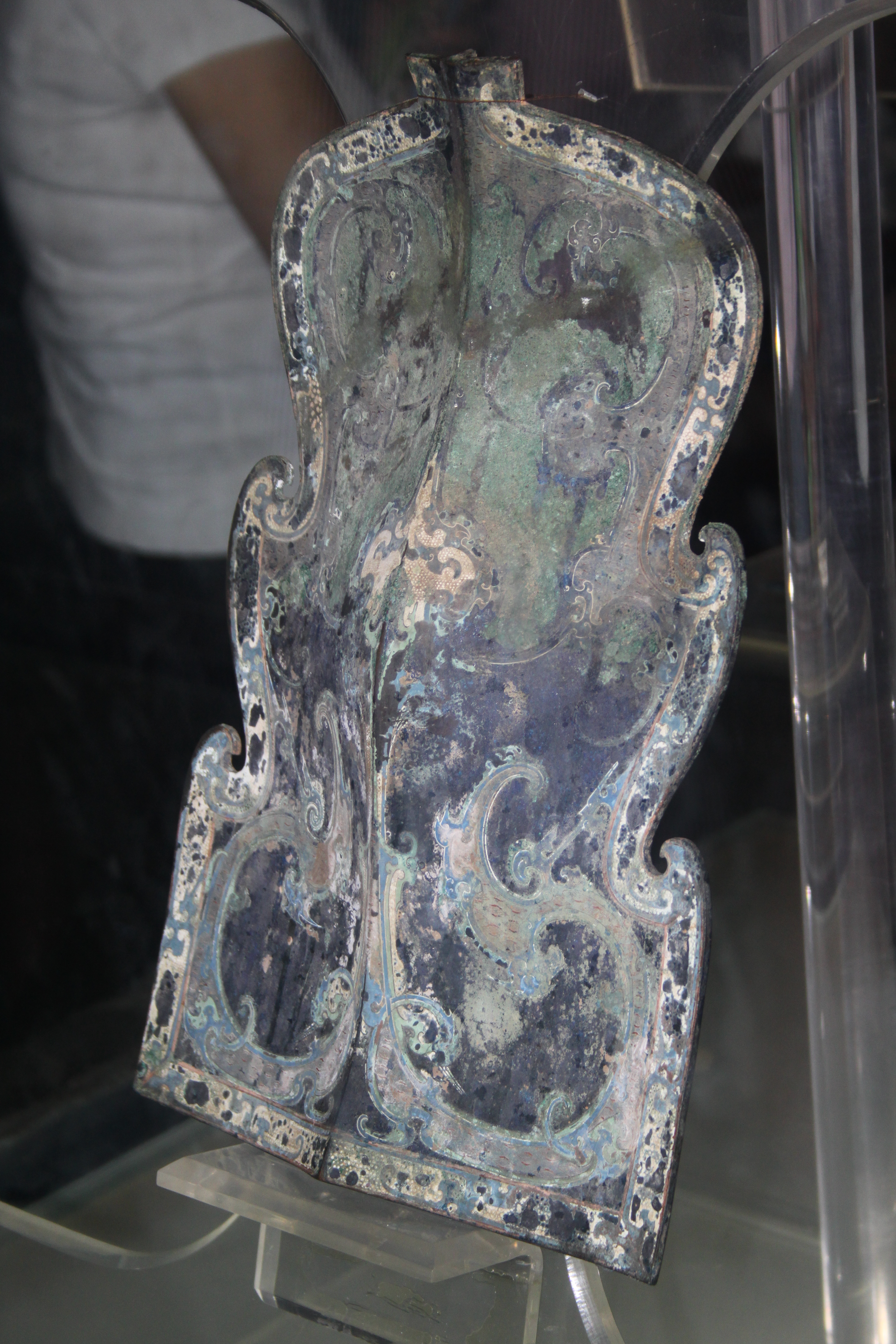
Qin bronze gourd shield

Lamellar armour of leather (more appropriately considered untanned or superficially tanned rawhide), bronze and iron appeared by the mid-4th century BC. It consisted of individual armour pieces (lamellae, lamella singular) that were either riveted or laced together to form a suit of armour. Iron helmets constructed with multiple lamellae began to replace the one-piece bronze helmets of old. One sample discovered in Yi county, Hebei Province was composed of 89 lamellae, averaging 5 cm x 4 cm.

In the 3rd century BC, both iron weapons and armour became more common. According to the Xunzi, "the hard iron spears of Wan ("宛") [a city in Chu, near modern Nanyang (南陽), Henan] are as cruel as wasps and scorpions." Iron weapons also gave Chinese armies an edge over barbarians. Han Fei recounts that during a battle with the Gonggong (共工) tribe, "the iron-tipped lances reached the enemy, and those without strong helmets and armour were injured." The effectiveness of bronze axes and shields may have been superseded by new iron weaponry and armor. The efficiency of crossbows however outpaced any progress in defensive armour. It was considered a common occurrence in ancient China for commoners or peasants to kill a lord with a well aimed crossbow bolt, regardless of whatever armour he might have been wearing at the time.

Shun taught the ways of good government for the following three years, and then took up shield and battle-ax and performed the war dance, and the Miao submitted. But in the war with the Gonggong, men used iron lances with steel heads that reached to the enemy, so that unless one was protected by a stout helmet and armor he was likely to be wounded. Hence shields and battle-axes served for ancient times, but no longer serve today. So I say that as circumstances change the ways of dealing with them alter too.

— Han Fei

The heaviest and most protective armours were often restricted to elite soldiers, though each state distributed armour in their own ways. The state of Chu favoured elite armoured crossbow units known for their endurance, and were capable of marching 160 km 'without resting.' Wei's elite forces were capable of marching over 40 km in one day while wearing heavy armour, a large crossbow with 50 bolts, a helmet, a side sword, and three days worth of rations. Those who met these standards earned an exemption from corvée labor and taxes for their entire family. By the time of the Qin dynasty, approximately half the soldiers could be equipped with some form of heavy armor as indicated by the Terracotta Army.

According to Su Qin, the state of Han made the best weapons, capable of cleaving through the strongest armour, shields, hide/leather boots and helmets. Their soldiers wore iron facemasks.

The state of Wu divided its army into three sections. The main army wore plain armour, the army of the left wore lacquered red armour, and the army of the right wore black armour.

By the end of the 3rd century BC at least a few horsemen wore armour of some kind.

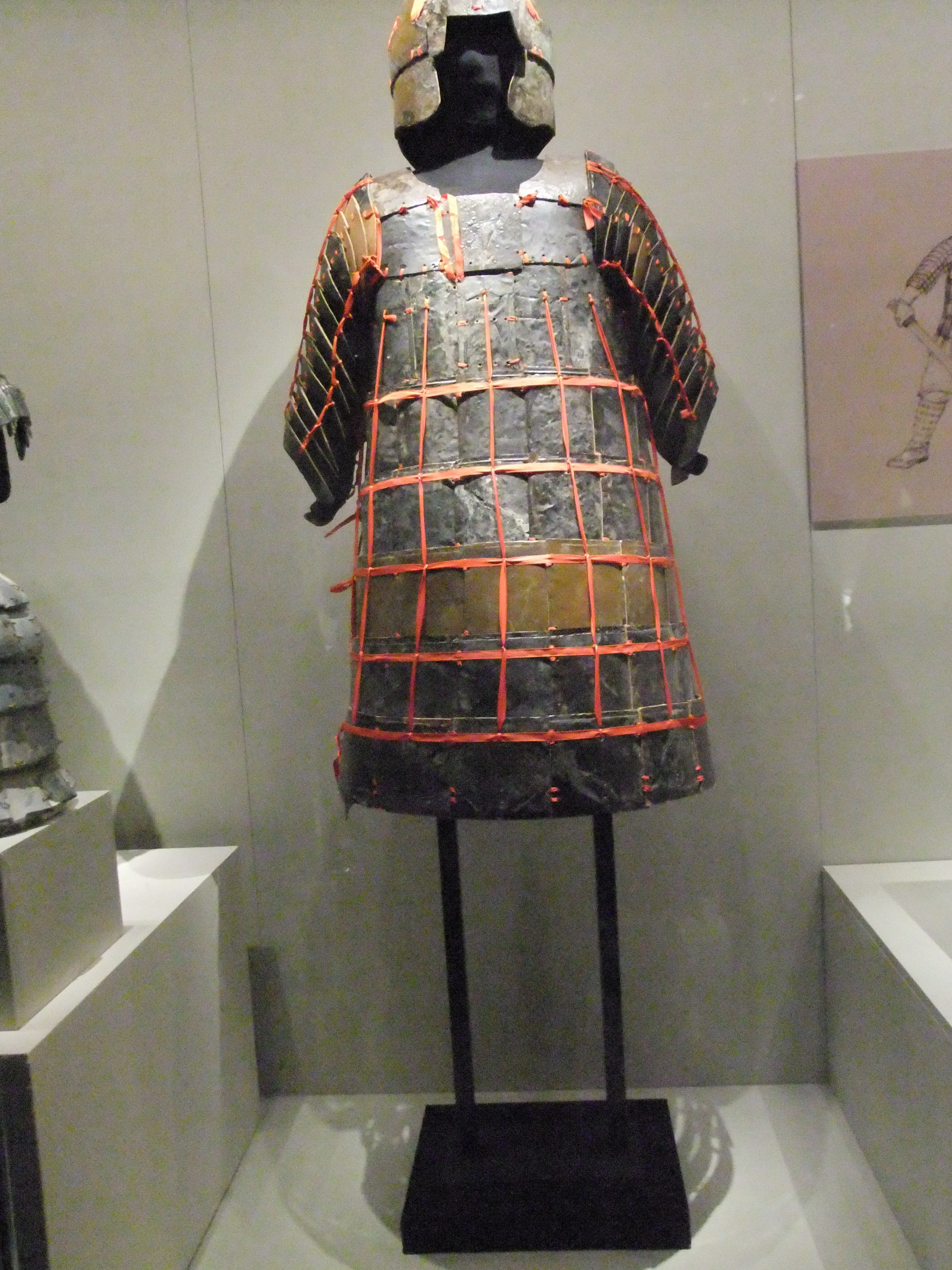
Warring States hide/leather armour (partially tanned rawhide made from materials such as rhino hide)

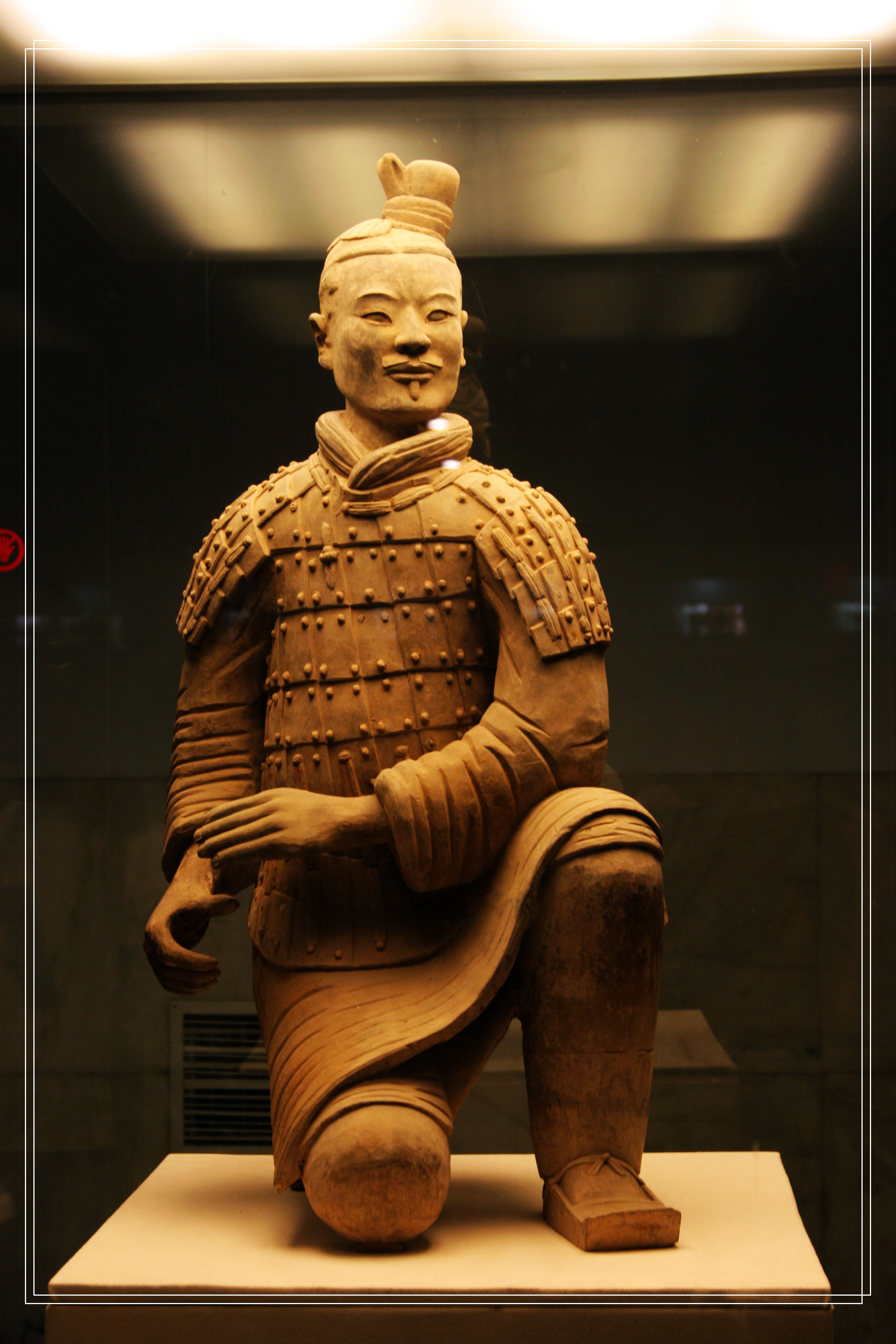
Qin dynasty Terracotta Army soldier wearing lamellar armour

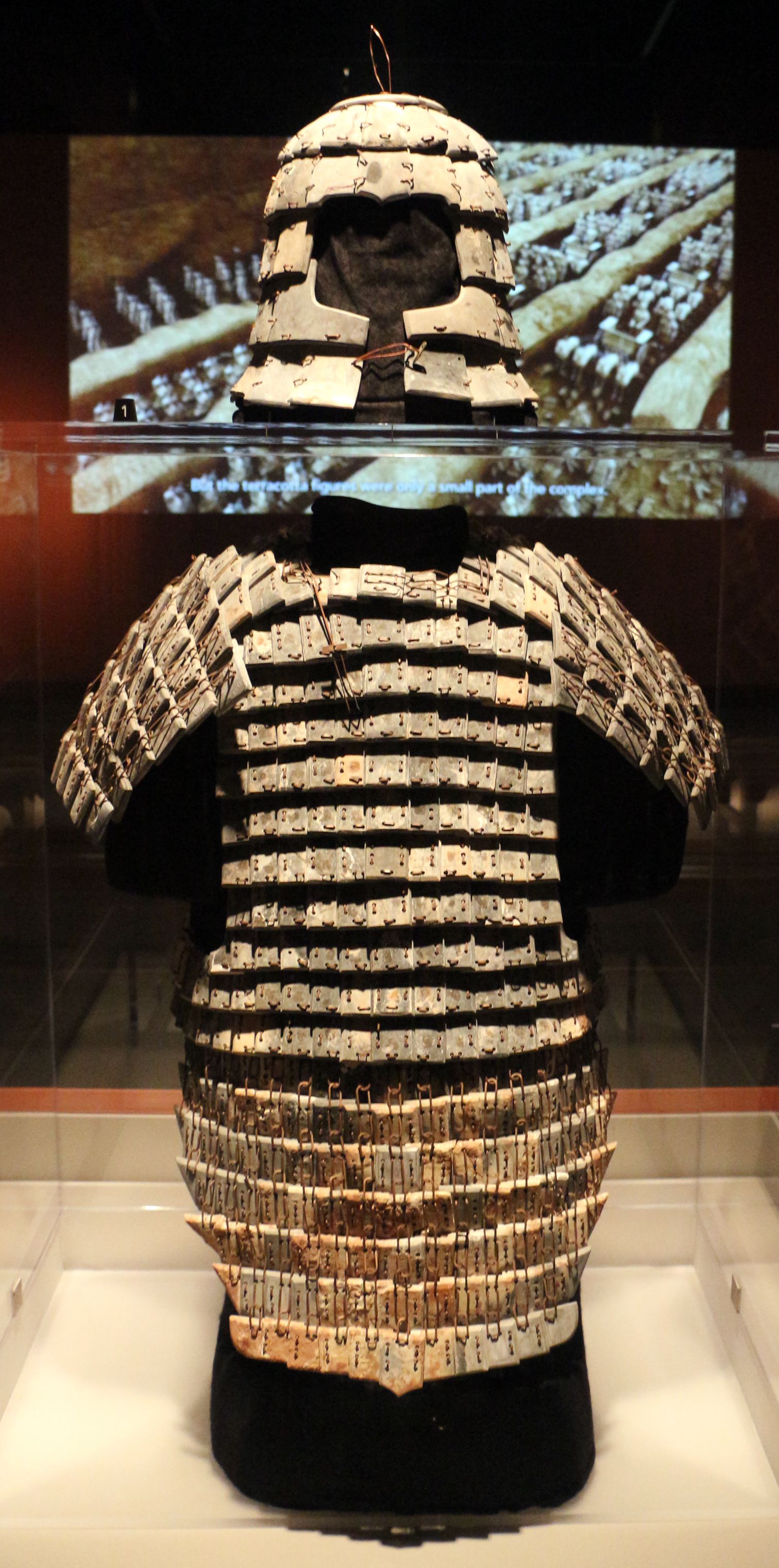
Qin limestone armour set resembling iron and leather armour at that time.

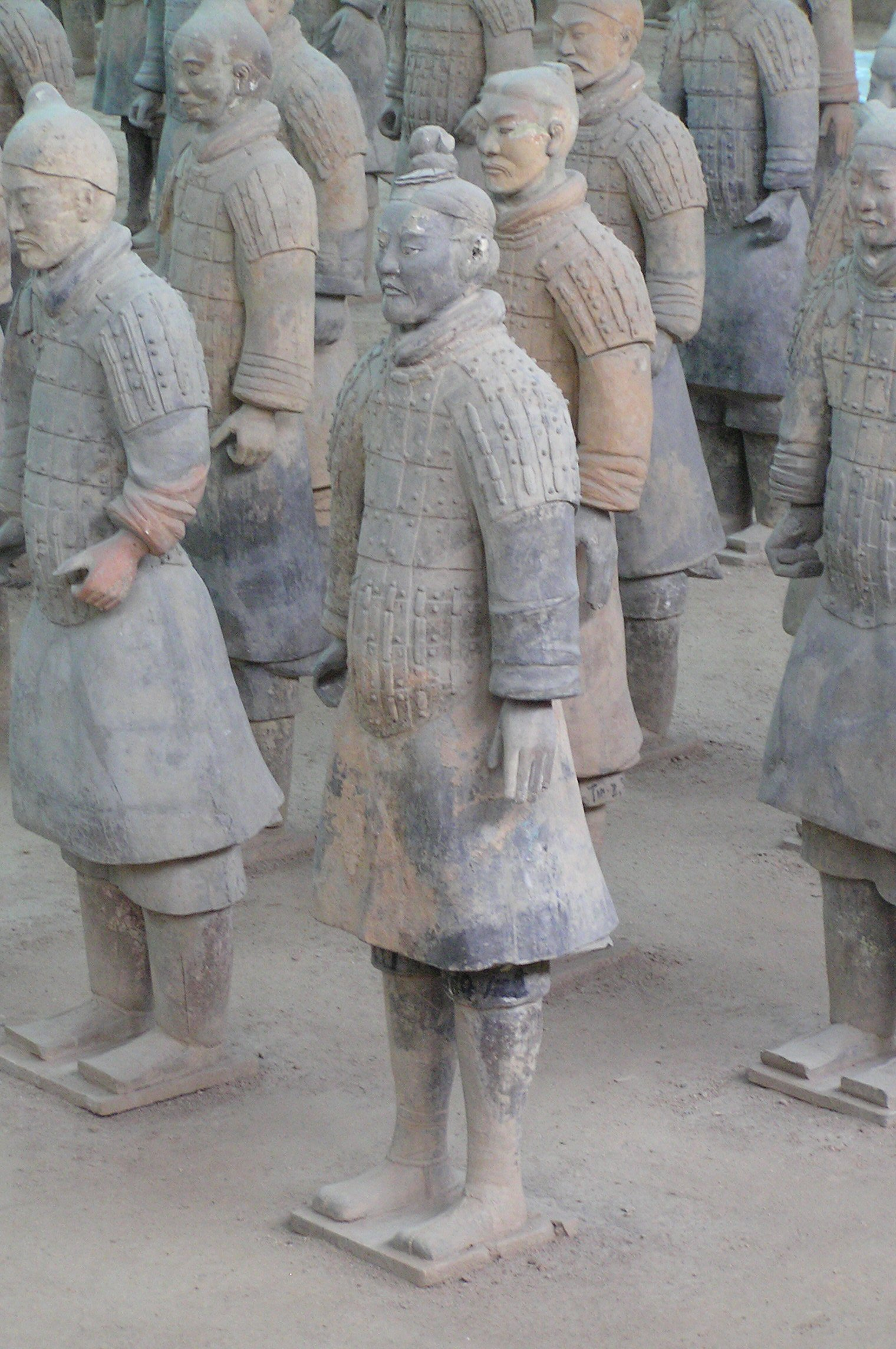
Group of Terracotta Army soldiers

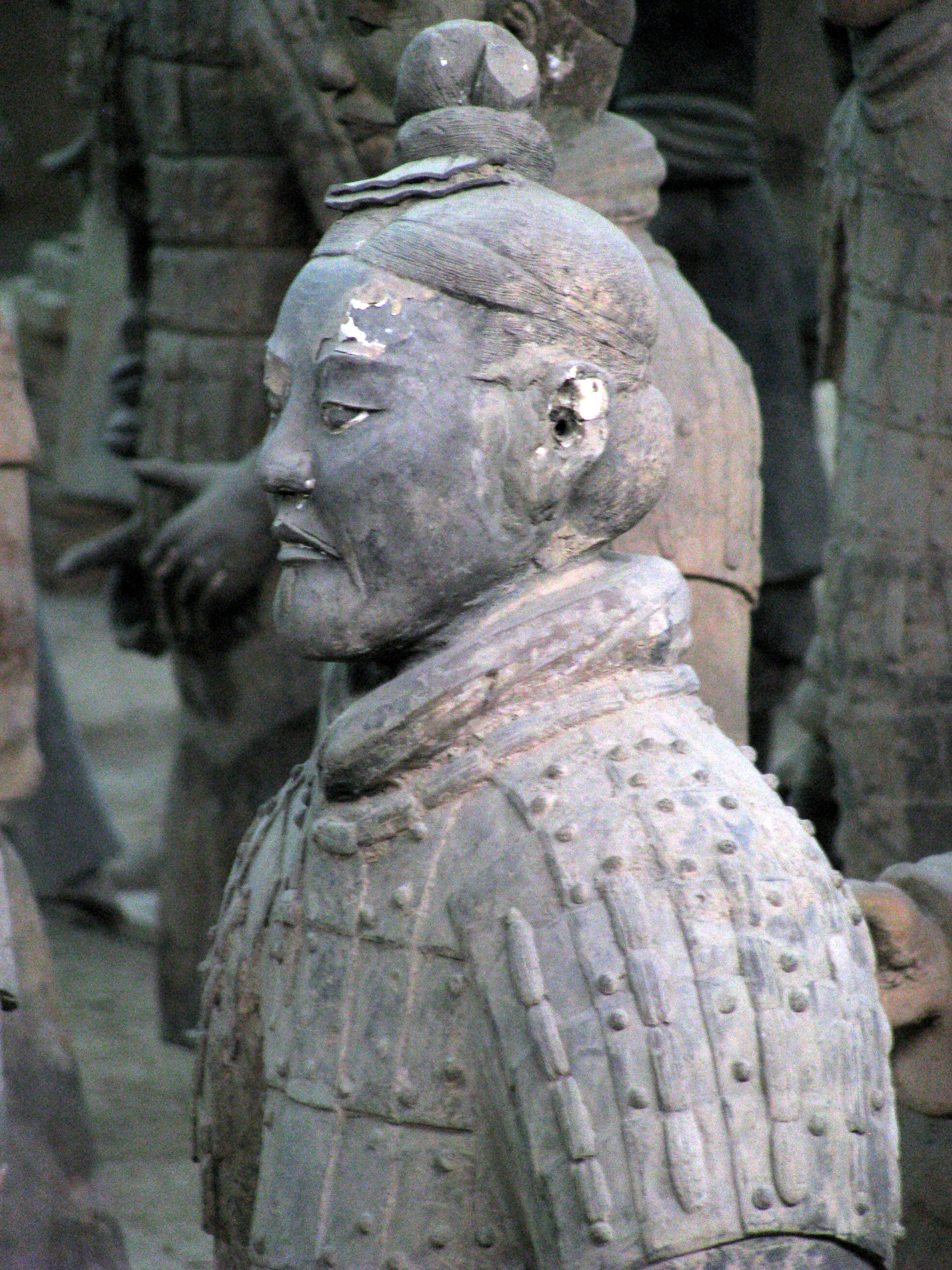
Terracotta soldier (upper body)

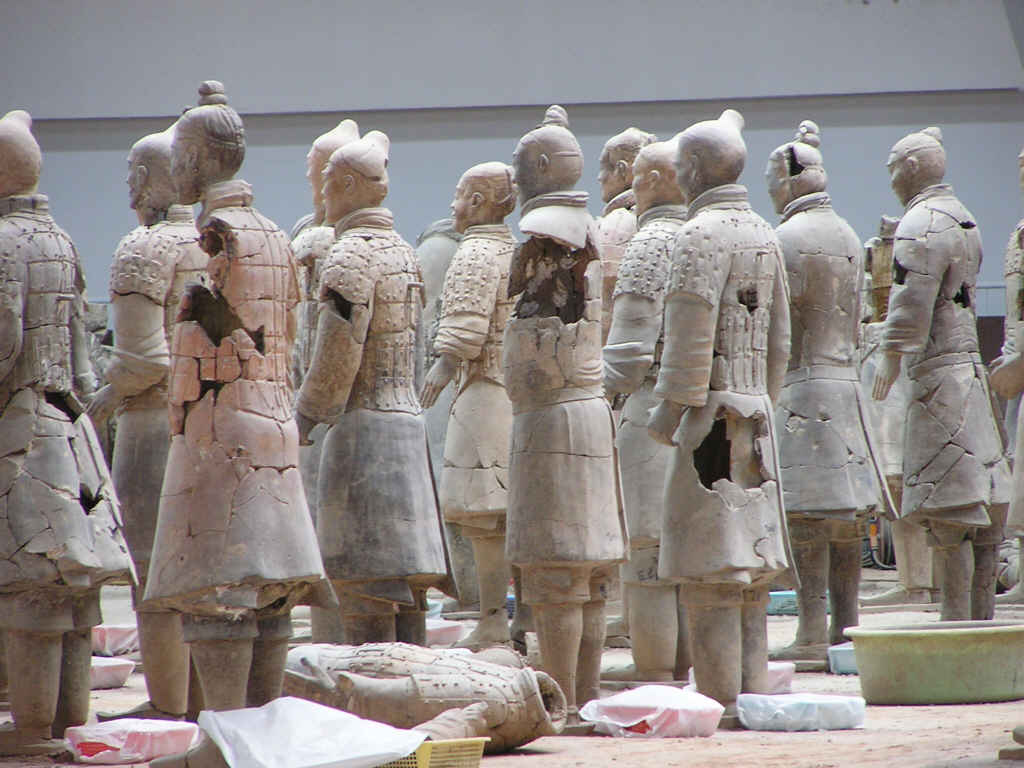
Terracotta soldiers being reassembled

==== Qin armour ====
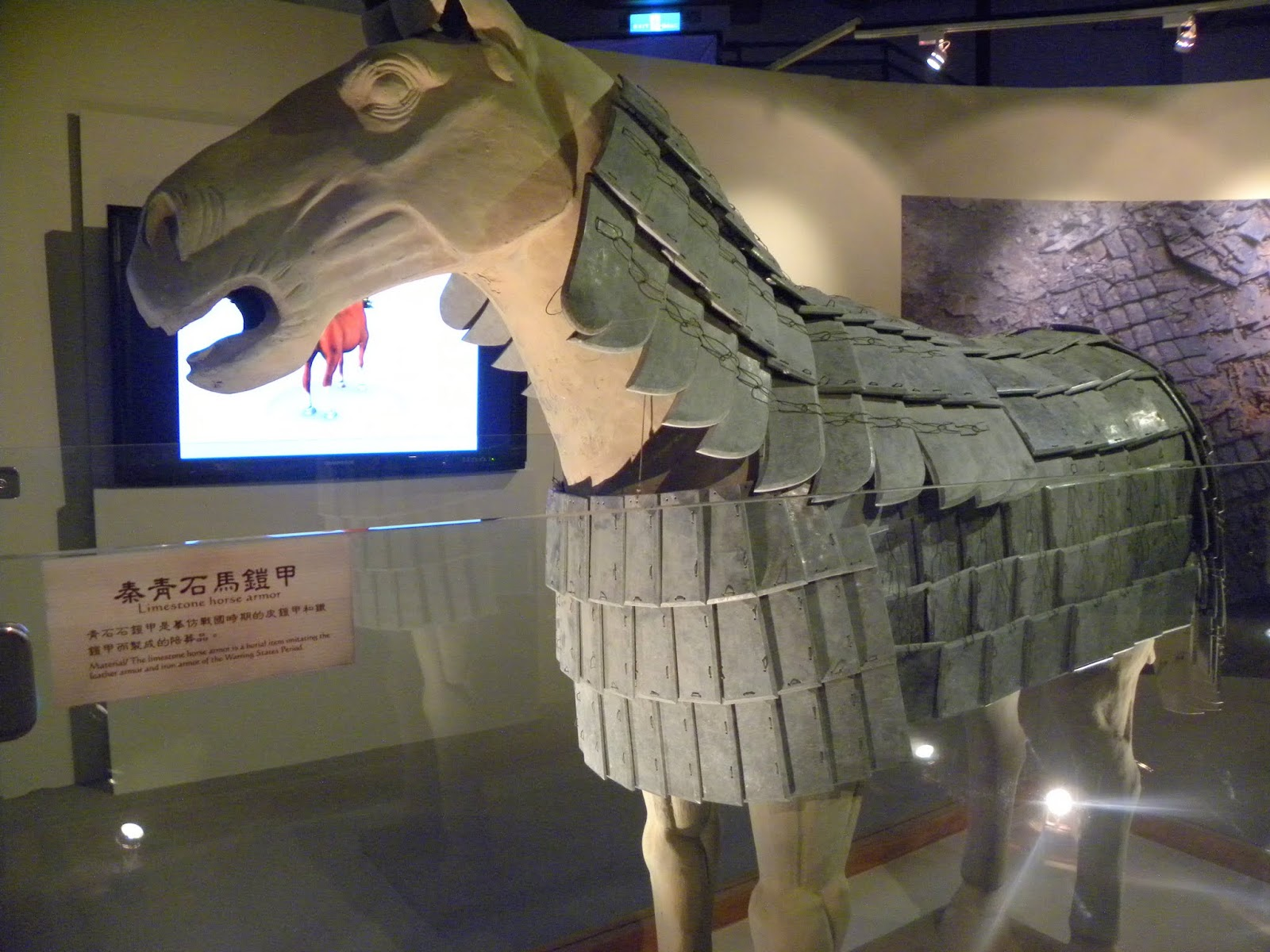
This Warring States limestone horse armour set is used as grave goods, made to resemble iron and leather armour at that time.

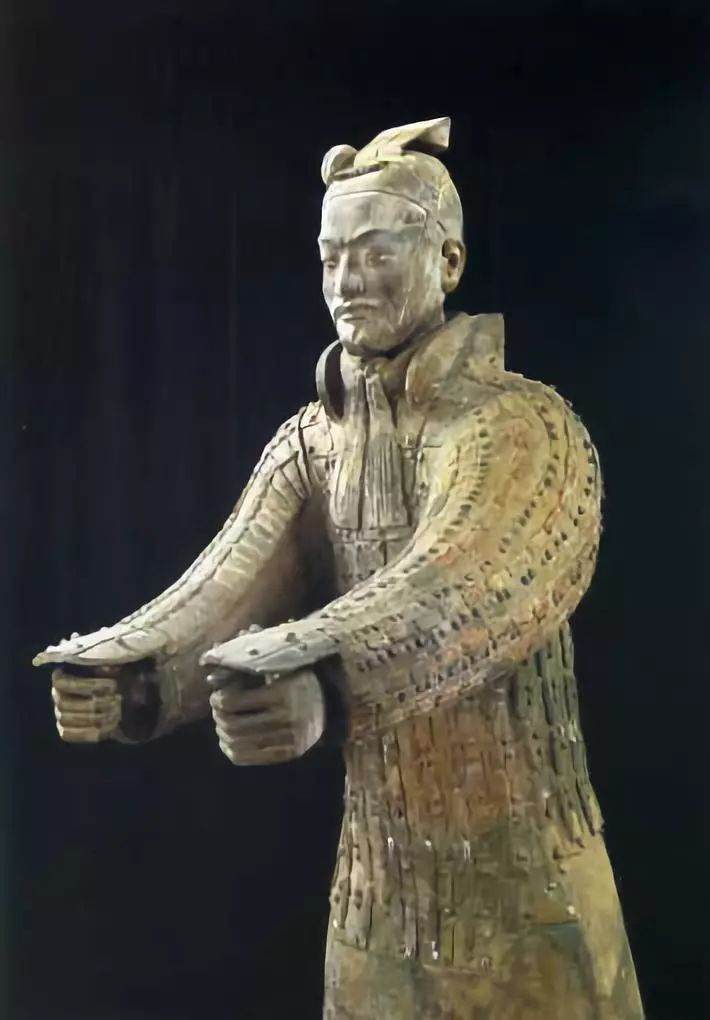
Armored charioteer of the Terracotta Army with lamellar sleeves protecting the arms

The Qin calculated fines for more severe crimes in terms of one or two coats of armour, lower crimes in terms of shields, and the lowest in terms of coins. Qin soldiers sometimes threw off their armour in a kind of berserk rage and engaged in fanatical charges. Qin armour usually used rectangular lamellae with dimensions of 7.5 cm x 8.5 cm and 10.5 cm x 7.8 cm. Dimensions of lamellae used for charioteer armour varies between the upper body, lower body, and arms. Lamellae on the upper body were 7 cm x 6 cm, the lower body 9 cm x 6.5 cm, and arms 4–7.5 cm x 4 cm. Lamellae on cavalrymen were 8 cm x 5.7 cm. A complete set of Qin armour, judging by the finds in the Terracotta Army consisted of 250 to 612 pieces in total, not including the helmet.

Six groups of armour have been identified in the Terracotta Army corresponding to rank and military division. Some soldiers are outfitted with little to no armour at all, cavalrymen with armour that covered the chest, charioteers with longer armour, armed infantry with armour covering the torso and shoulders, low-ranking officers with armour using large lamellae, middle-ranking officers with shorter armour covering the torso and waist or just the breast, but with decorations such as ribbons, and generals with a distinctive coat showing torso armour and ribbons to signify their status. None of the terracotta soldiers have been found wearing a helmet or holding a shield. However, this may be because the terracotta soldiers are simulating a funerary procession for their ruler, and according to protocol, subordinates had to remove their helmets when appearing before the emperor. Helmets have been found in other excavated pits near the terracotta soldiers. Furthermore, another explanation for both the lack of both weapons and helmets for the terracotta army is that most of the functional, usable equipment made for the terracotta army were believed to have been looted during the rebellion against the Qin dynasty.

There is some evidence that armour for horses might have existed for Qin cavalry judging by 300 lamellae too large for human use.

=== Han dynasty (206 BC–220 AD) ===
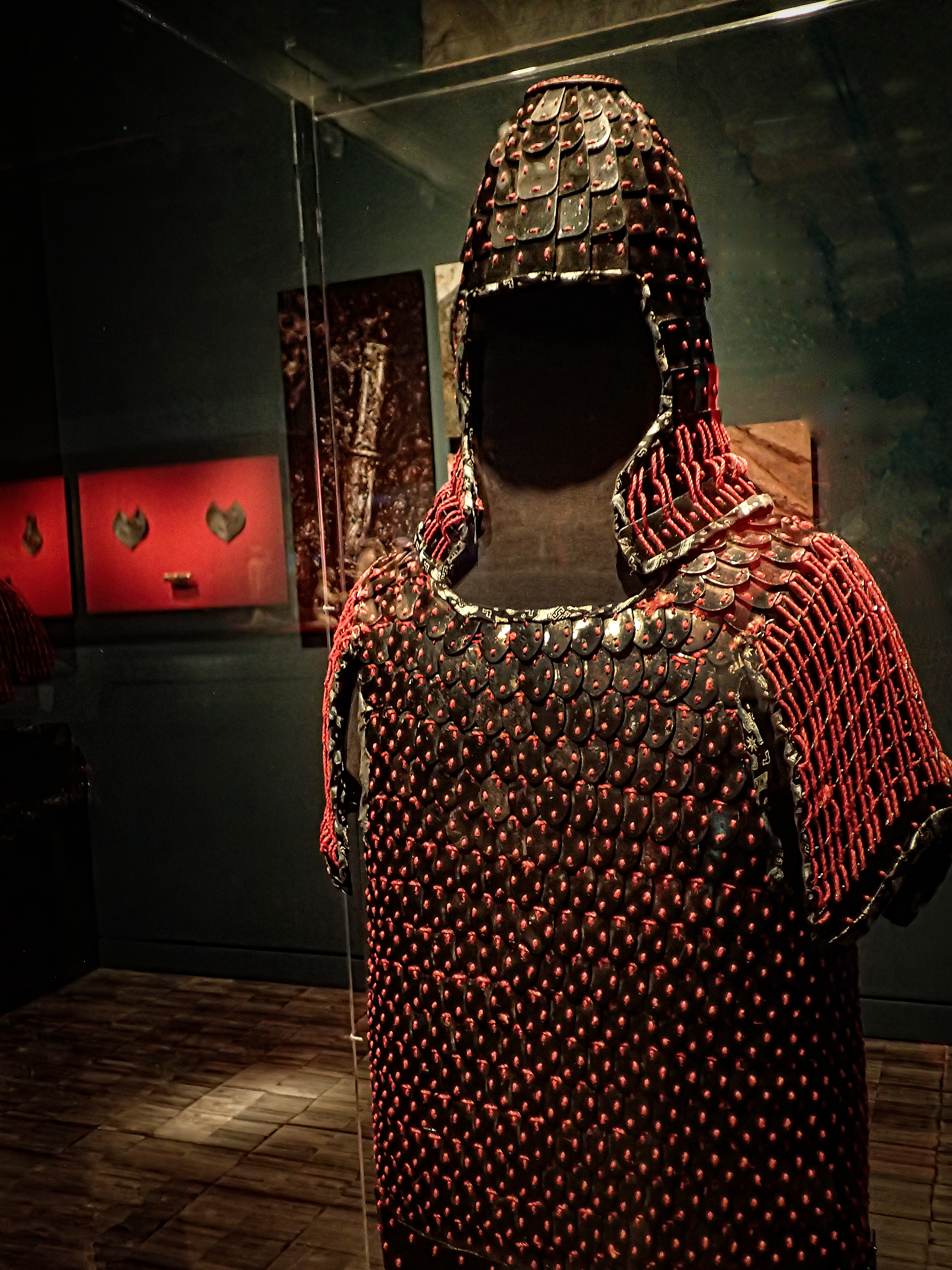
Restored lamellar armor and helmet of Han dynasty

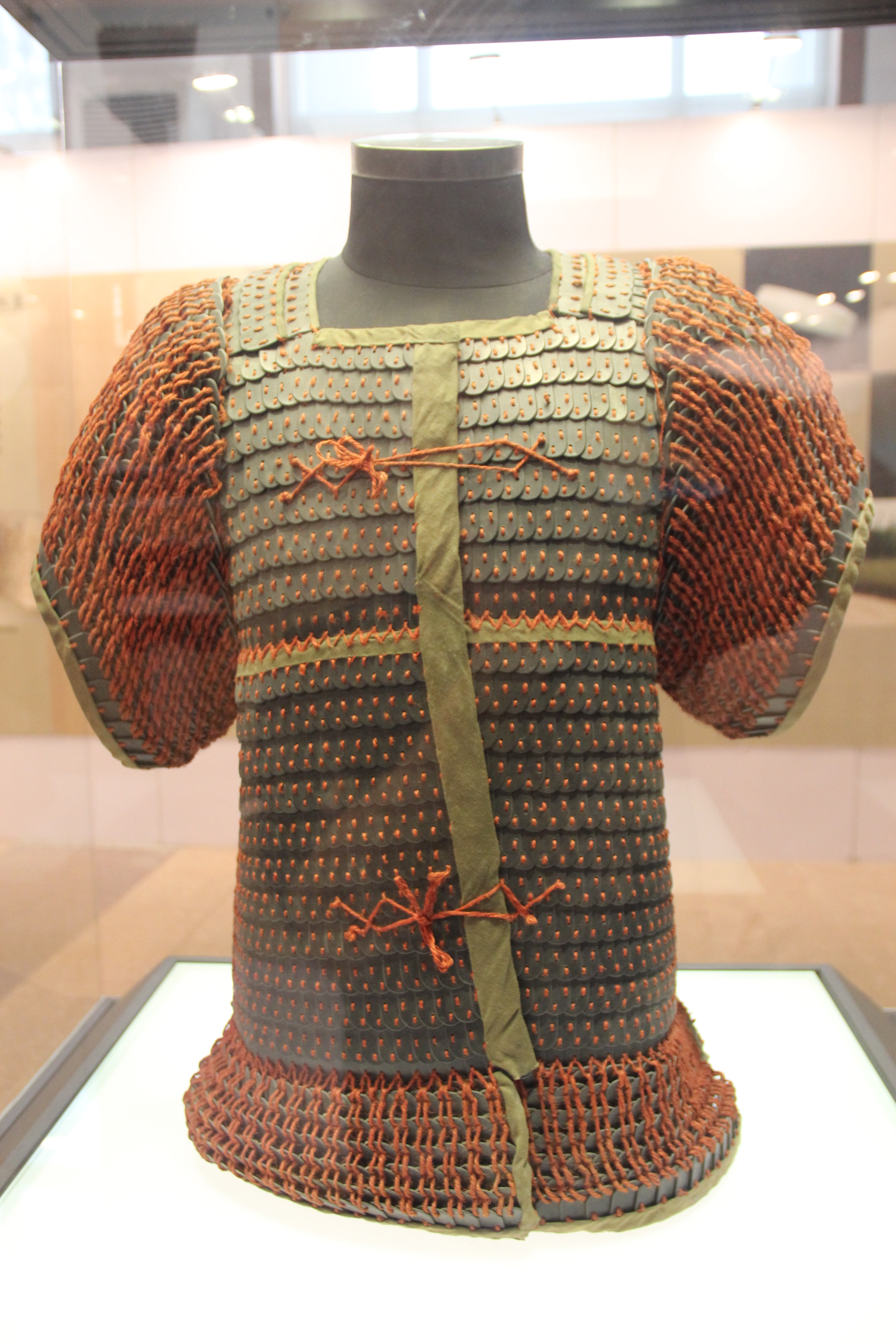
Replica of Western Han "sleeved armor" (lit. tǒngxiùkǎi", 筒袖铠)

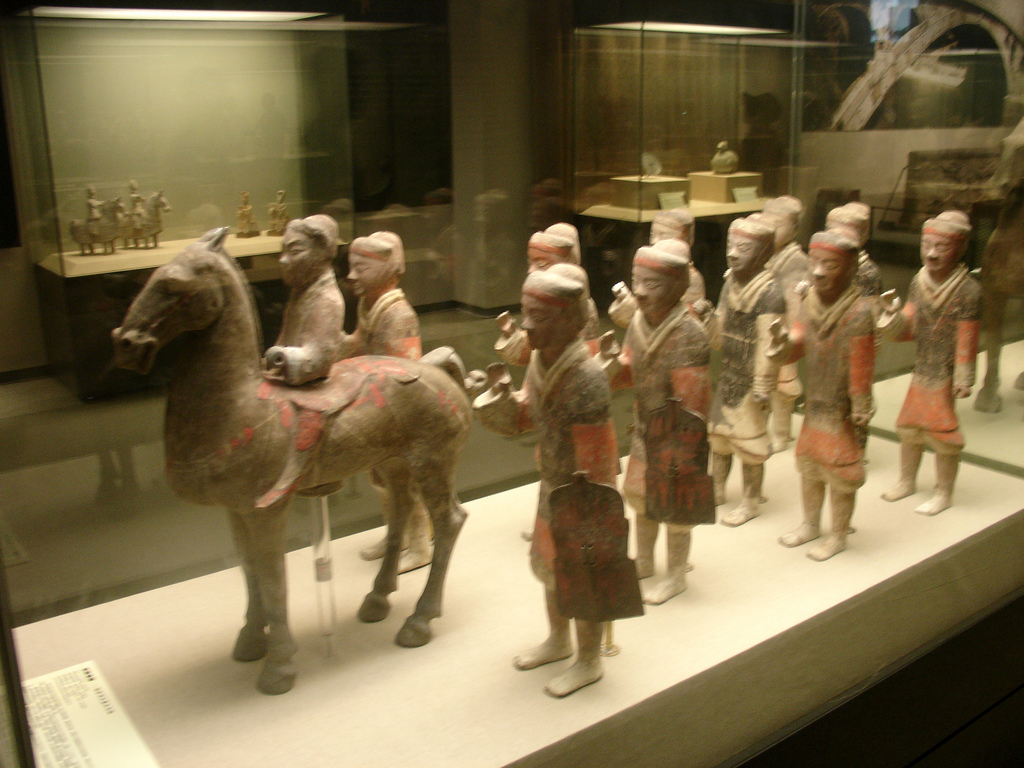
Han shieldbearers

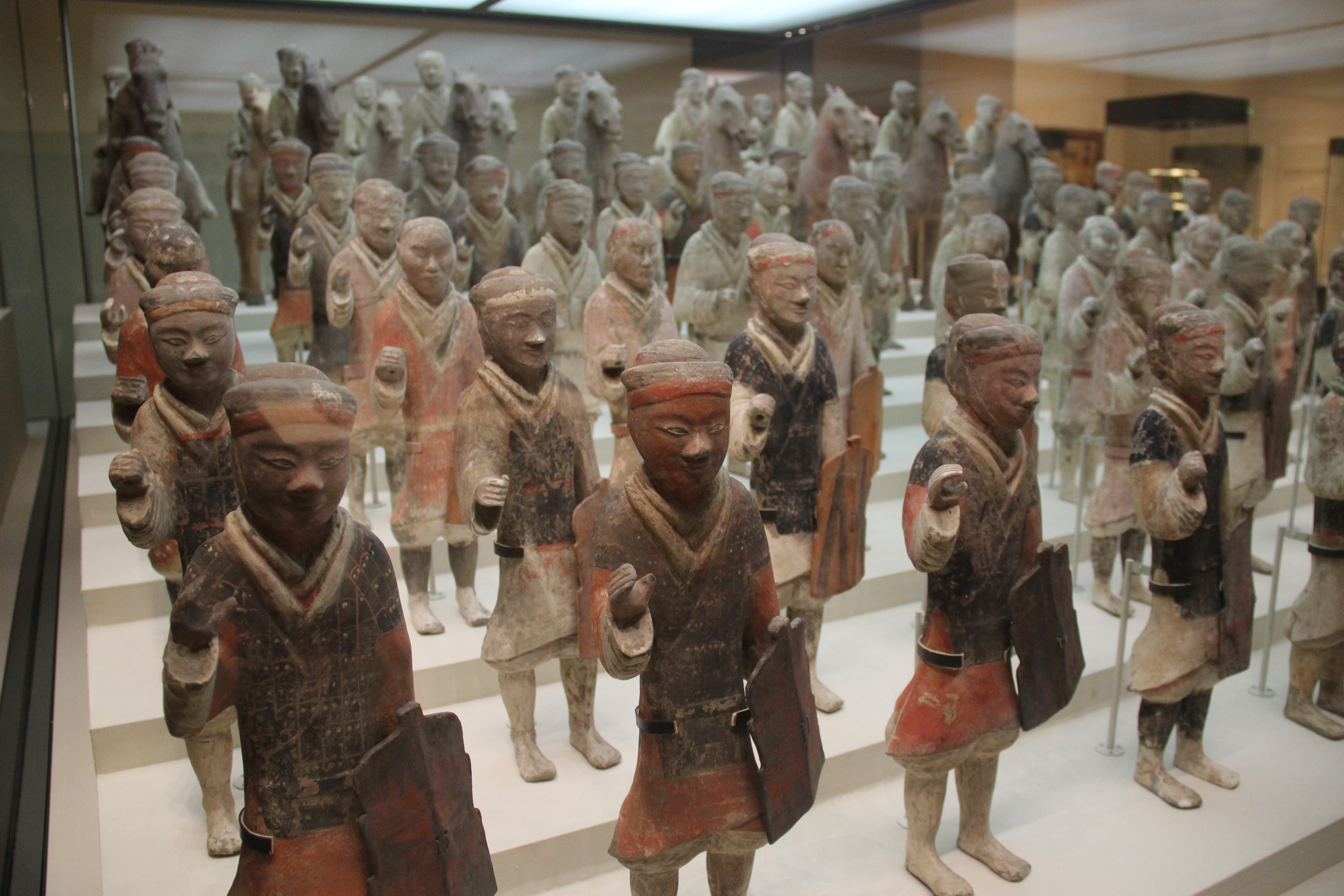
Han dynasty soldiers with gourd shields

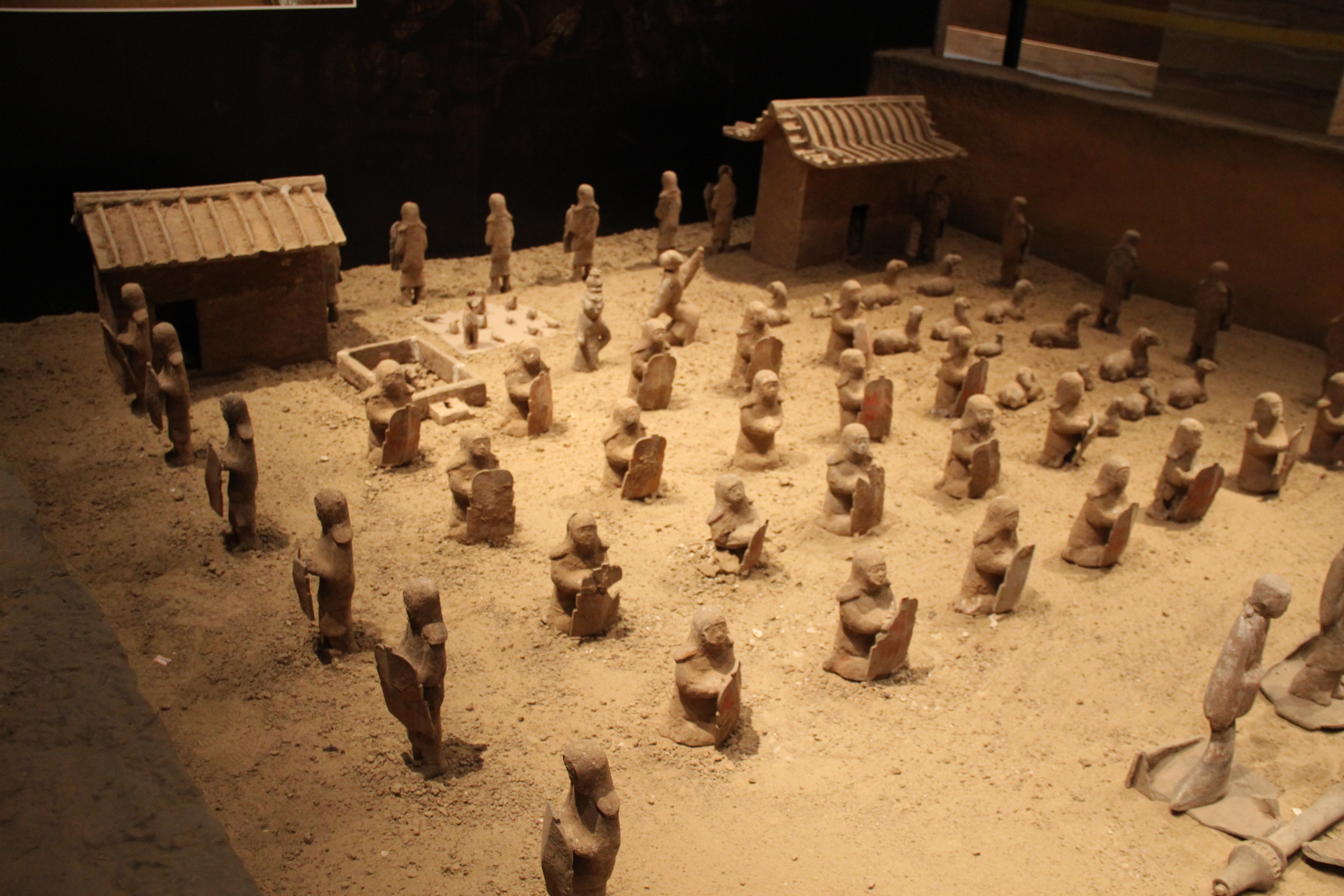
Hooded shield bearers from a Han tomb

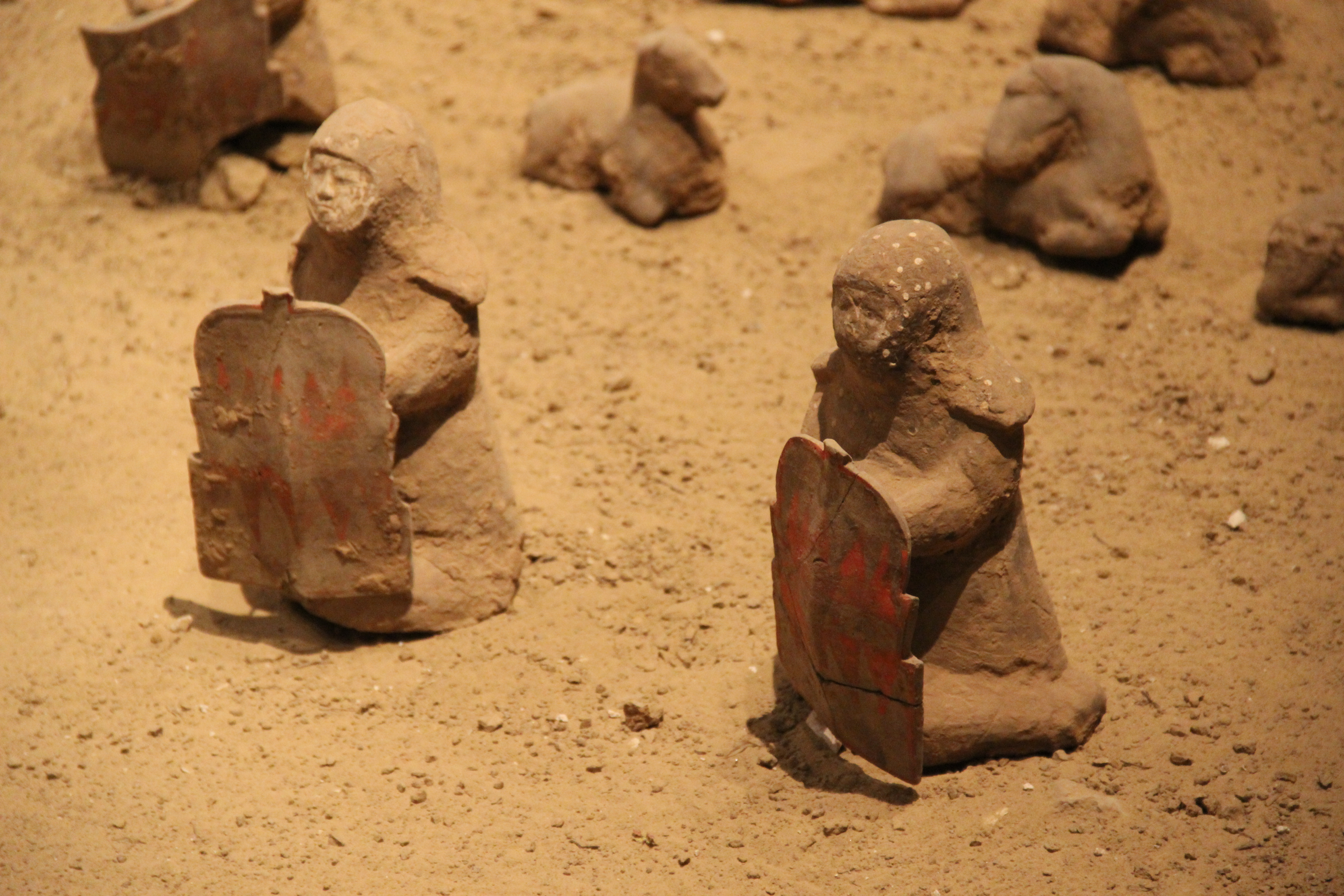
Han shieldbearers with armored hoods

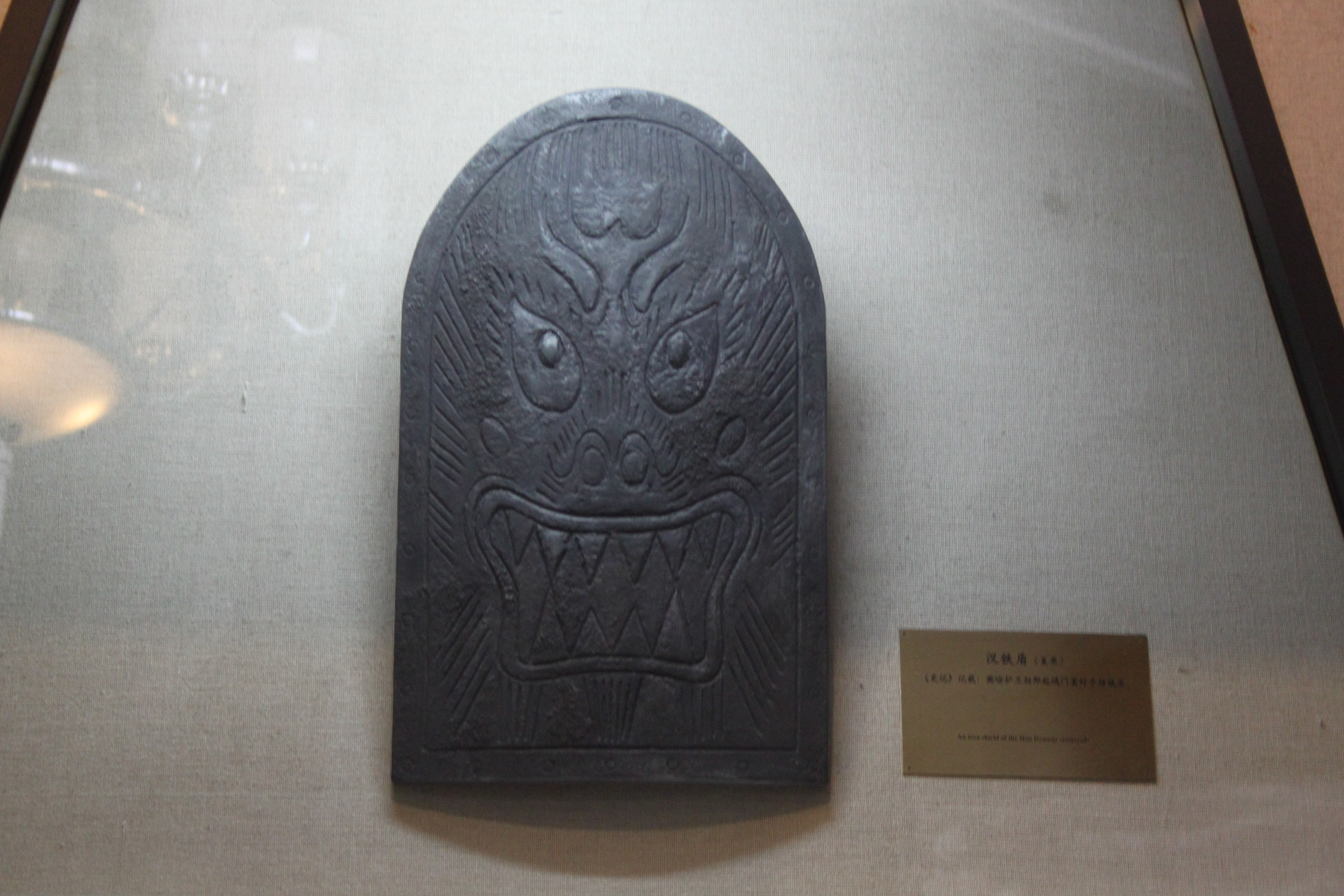
Restored Han iron shield

Han dynasty armour was largely the same as the Qin dynasty with minor variations. Infantry wore suits of lacquered rawhide, hardened and lacquered leather [or partially tanned rawhide?], or iron [or iron alloys such as steel] lamellar armour and caps or iron helmets. A suit of iron armour dating to the Western Han period consisted of 328 lamellae pieces. Some riders wore armour and carried shields and some horses were armored. However, more widespread and more comprehensive horse armour is not attested to until the late 2nd century.

Han dynasty inventory list (13 BC)
Item	Inventory	Imperial Heirloom
Jia armour	142,701	34,265
Kai armour	63,324	
Thigh armour	10,563	
Iron thigh armour	256	
Iron lamellar armour (!)	587,299	
Helmets	98,226	
Horse armour	5,330	
Shields	102,551	

During the late 2nd century BC, the government created a monopoly on the ironworks, which may have caused a decrease in quality of iron and armour. Bu Shi claimed that the resulting products were inferior because they were made to meet quotas rather than for practical use. These monopolies as debated in the Discourses on Salt and Iron were abolished by the beginning of the 1st century AD. In 150 AD, Cui Shi made similar complaints about the issue of quality control in government production due to corruption: "...not long thereafter the overseers stopped being attentive, and the wrong men have been promoted by Imperial decree. Greedy officers fight over the materials, and shifty craftsmen cheat them... Iron [i.e. steel] is quenched in vinegar, making it brittle and easy to... [?] The suits of armour are too small and do not fit properly."

Composite bows were considered effective against unarmoured enemies at 150 metres, and against armoured opponents at 60 metres.

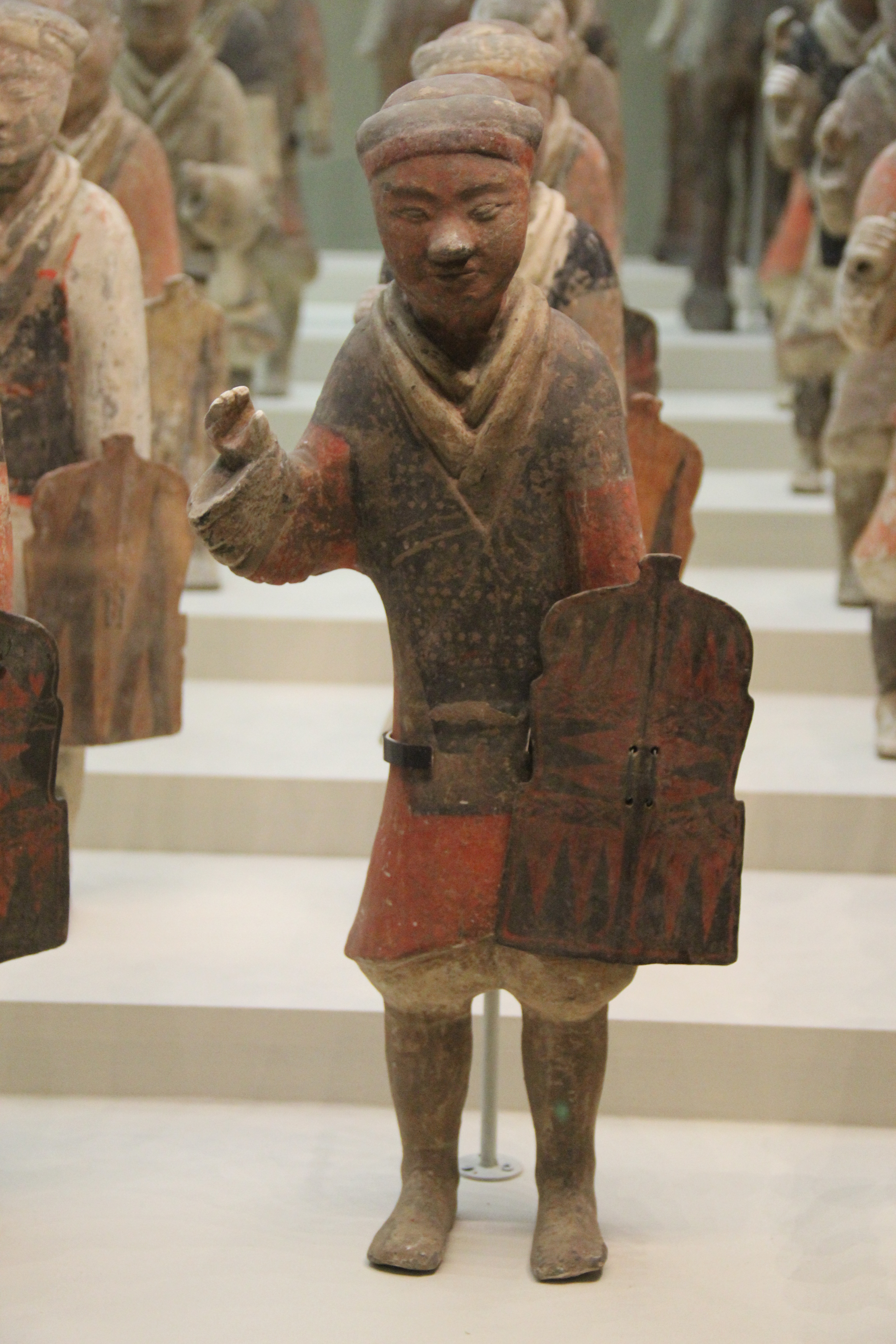
Han dynasty soldier figurine

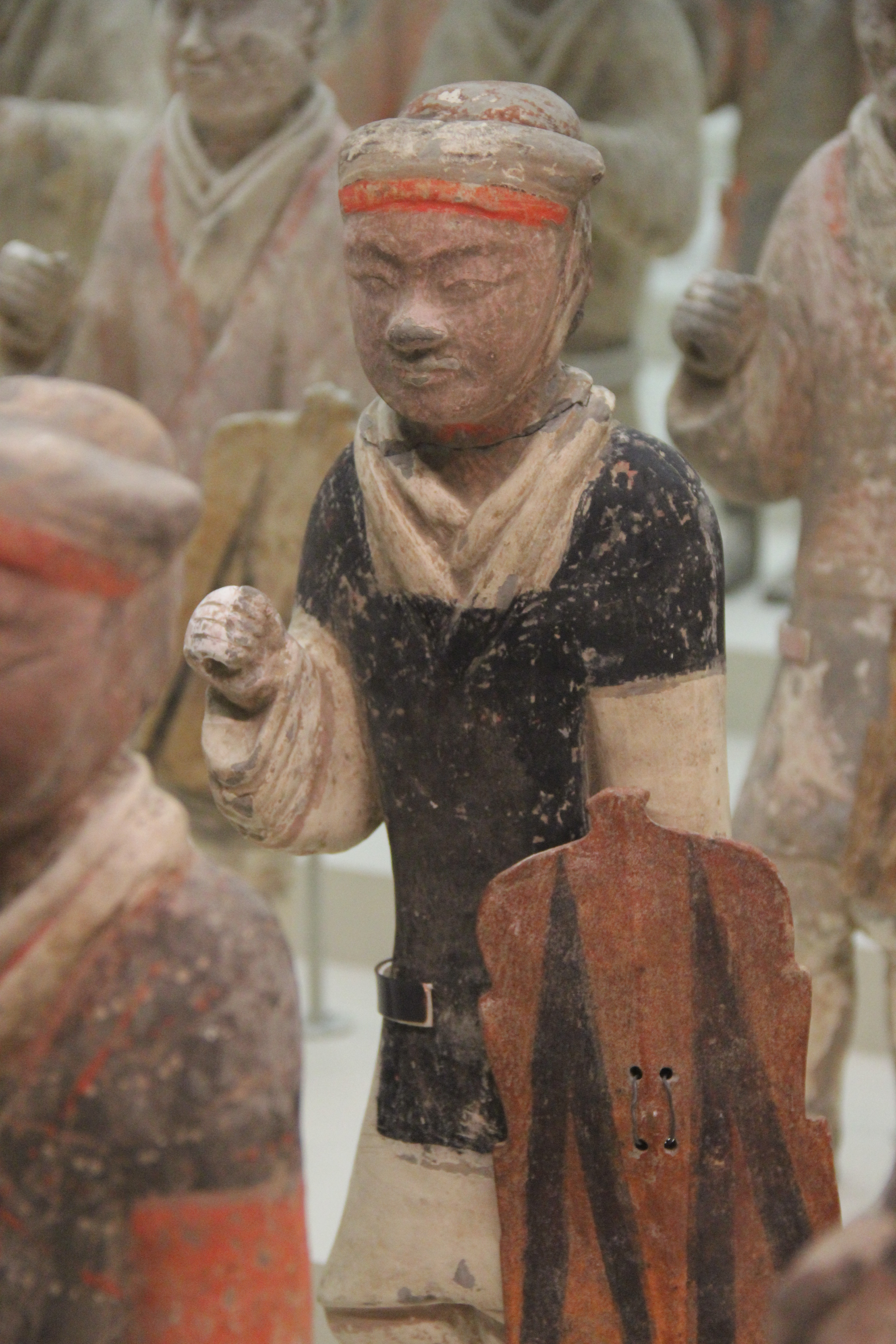
Gourd shield

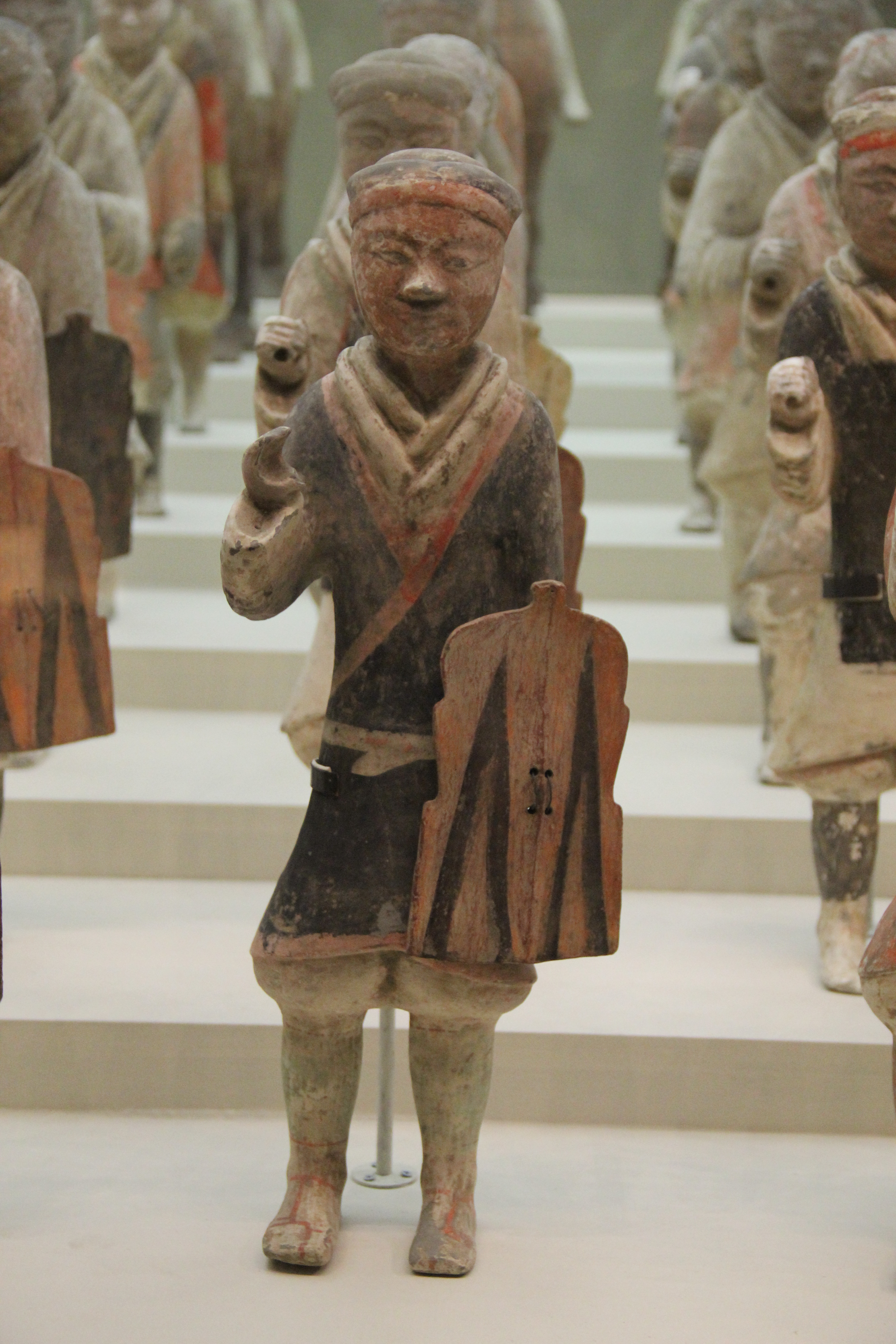
Gourd shield

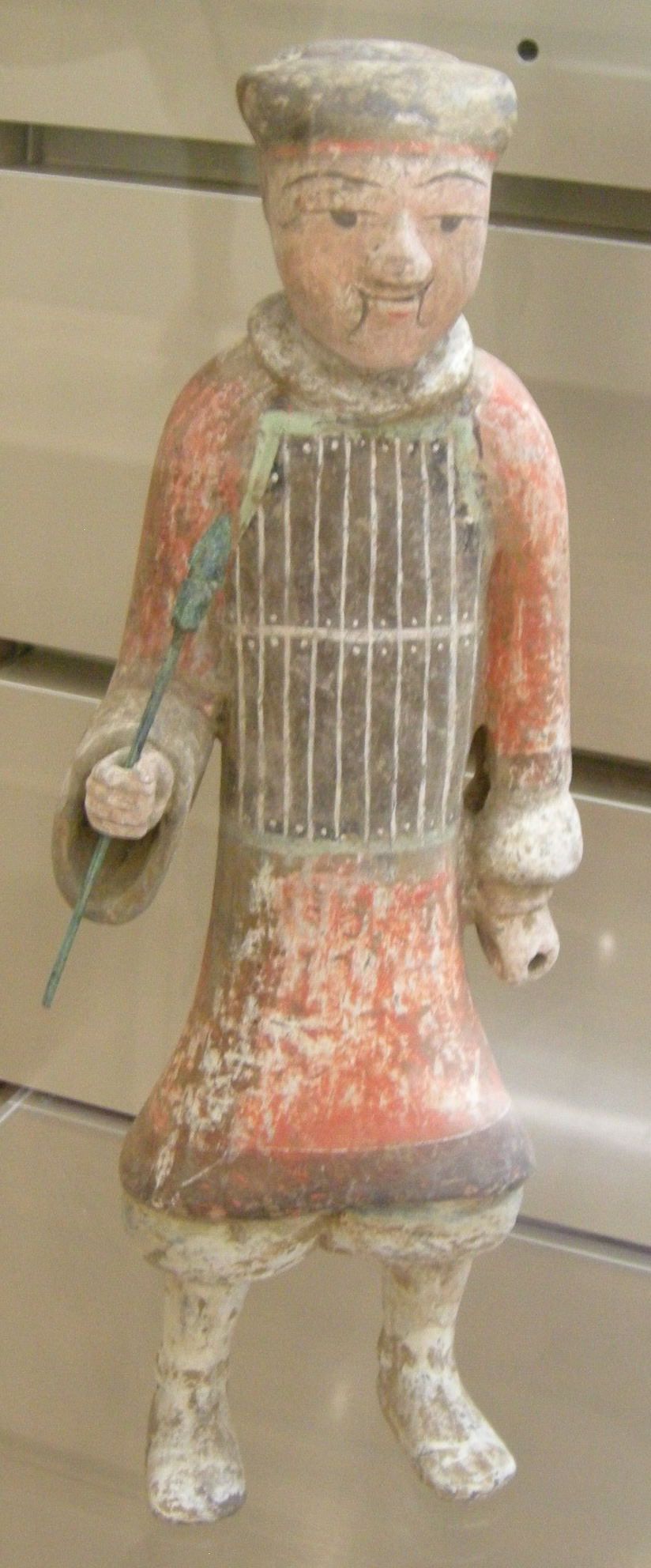

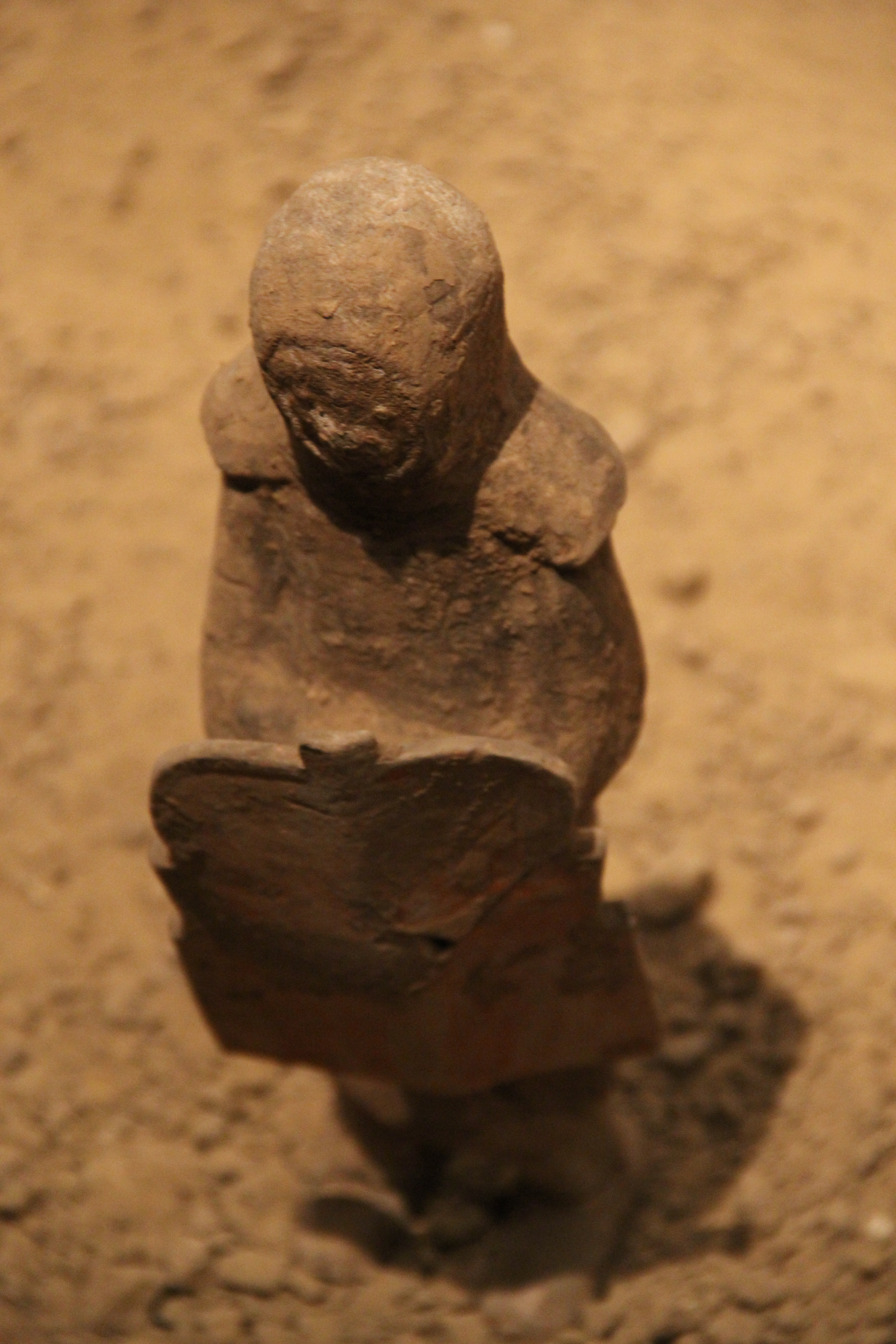
Shield bearer with armored hood

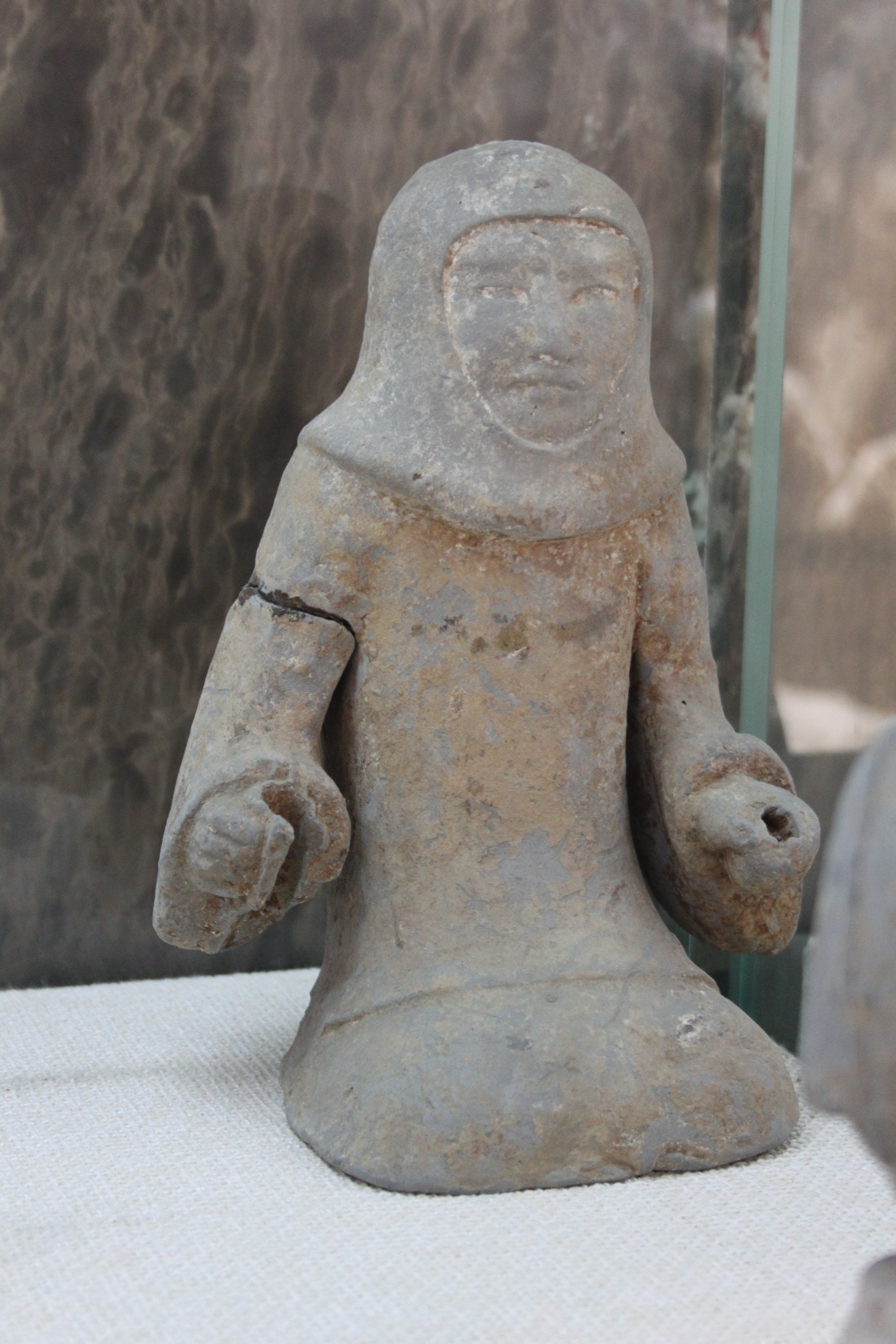
Soldier with armored hood

==== Hook shield ====
During the Han dynasty, a hook shield was used in combination with a sword when fighting against polearms. The hook shield was a small iron shield that had hooks at the top and bottom for hooking halberds or spears. Sometimes it had a thorny protrusion in the middle for attacking.

"Hooked parrier" is my attempt at a translation for gourang, it is unsatisfactory because "parrier" is not really an English word. Trousdale refers to this type of object, as seen in the Han reliefs, as a "small fencing shield". As far as I know, nothing resembling the gourang has been used in the West.

— Donald Wagner

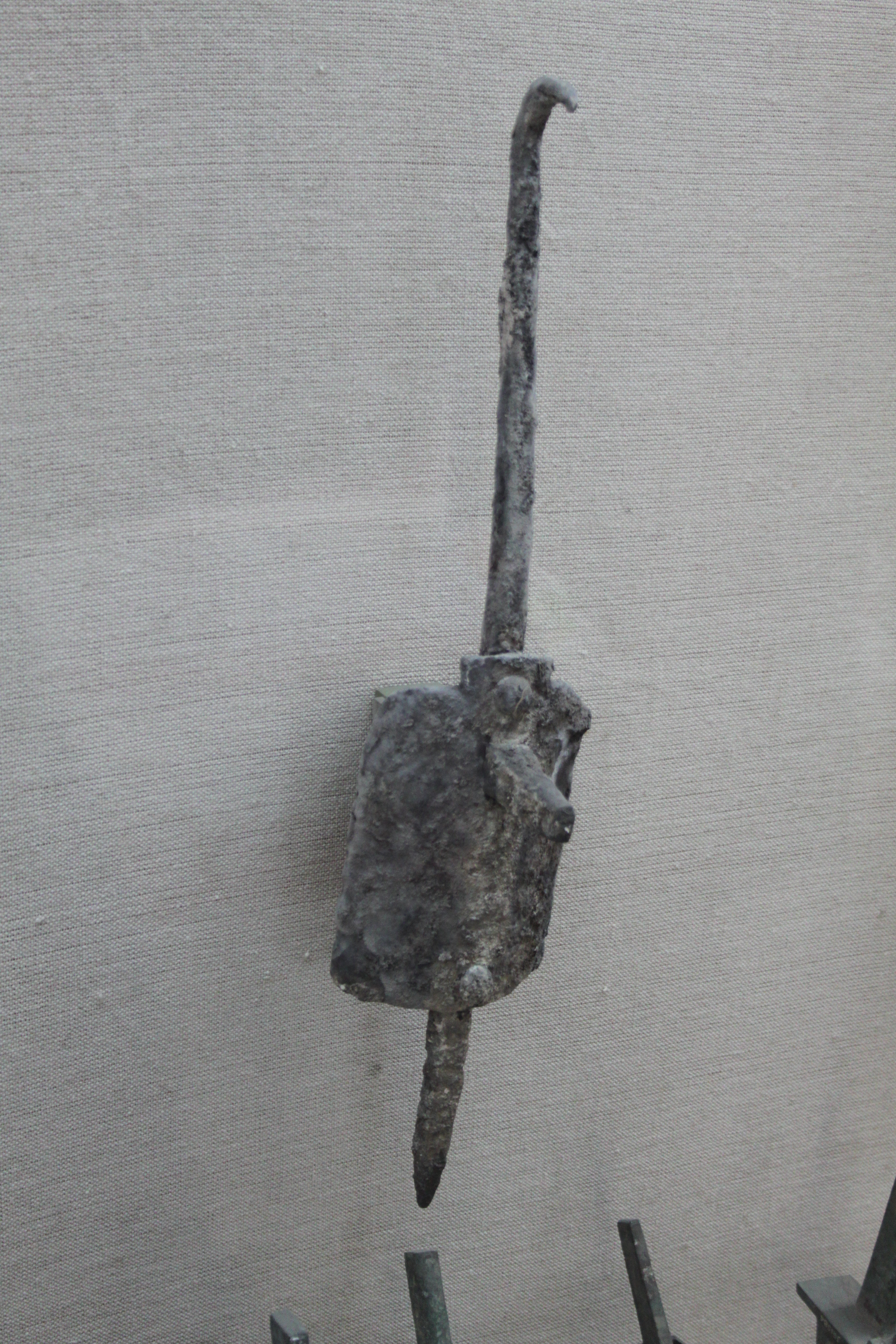
Han iron hook shield

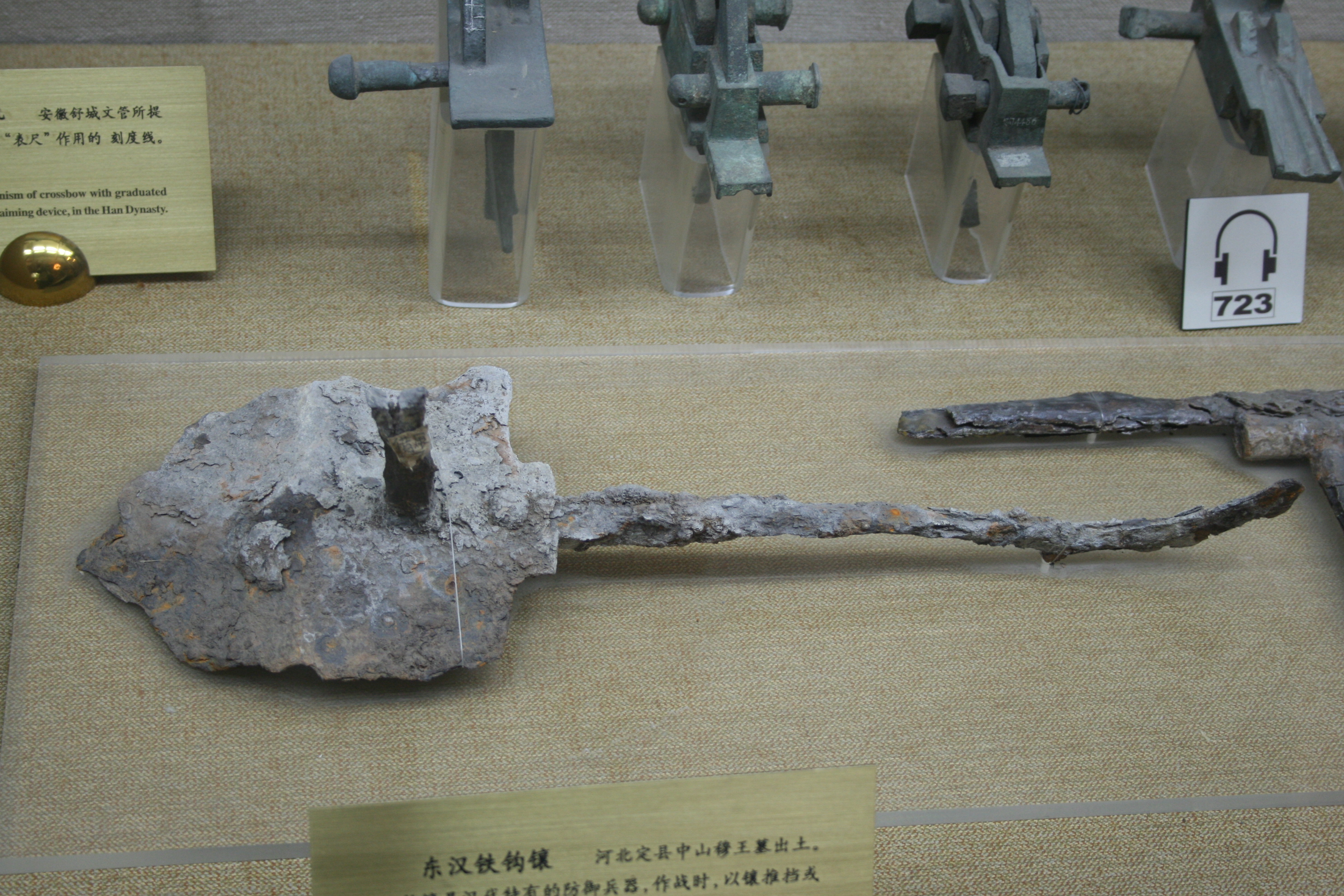
Han iron hook shield

=== Three Kingdoms (220–280) ===
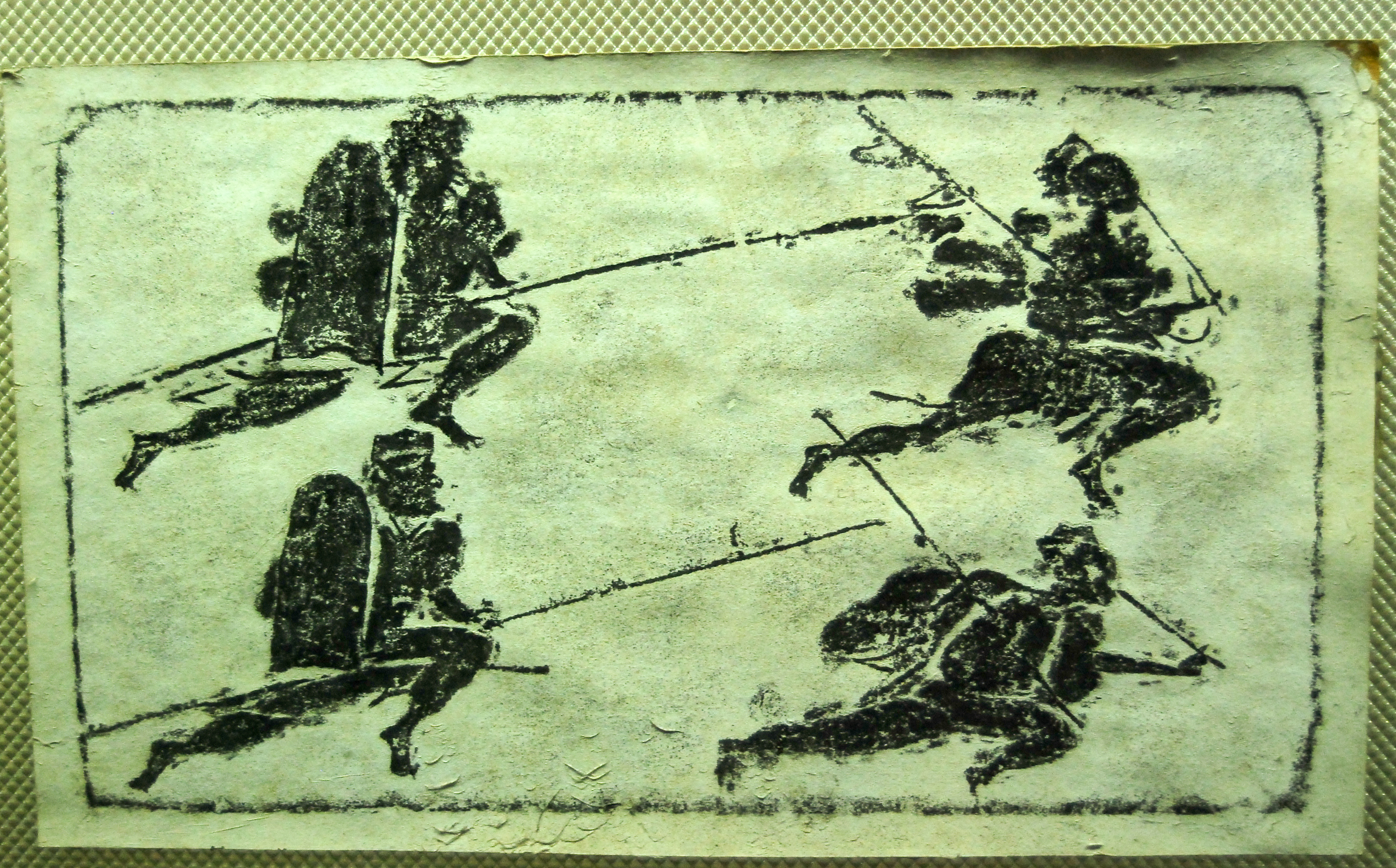
Late Eastern Han/Three Kingdoms shieldbearers

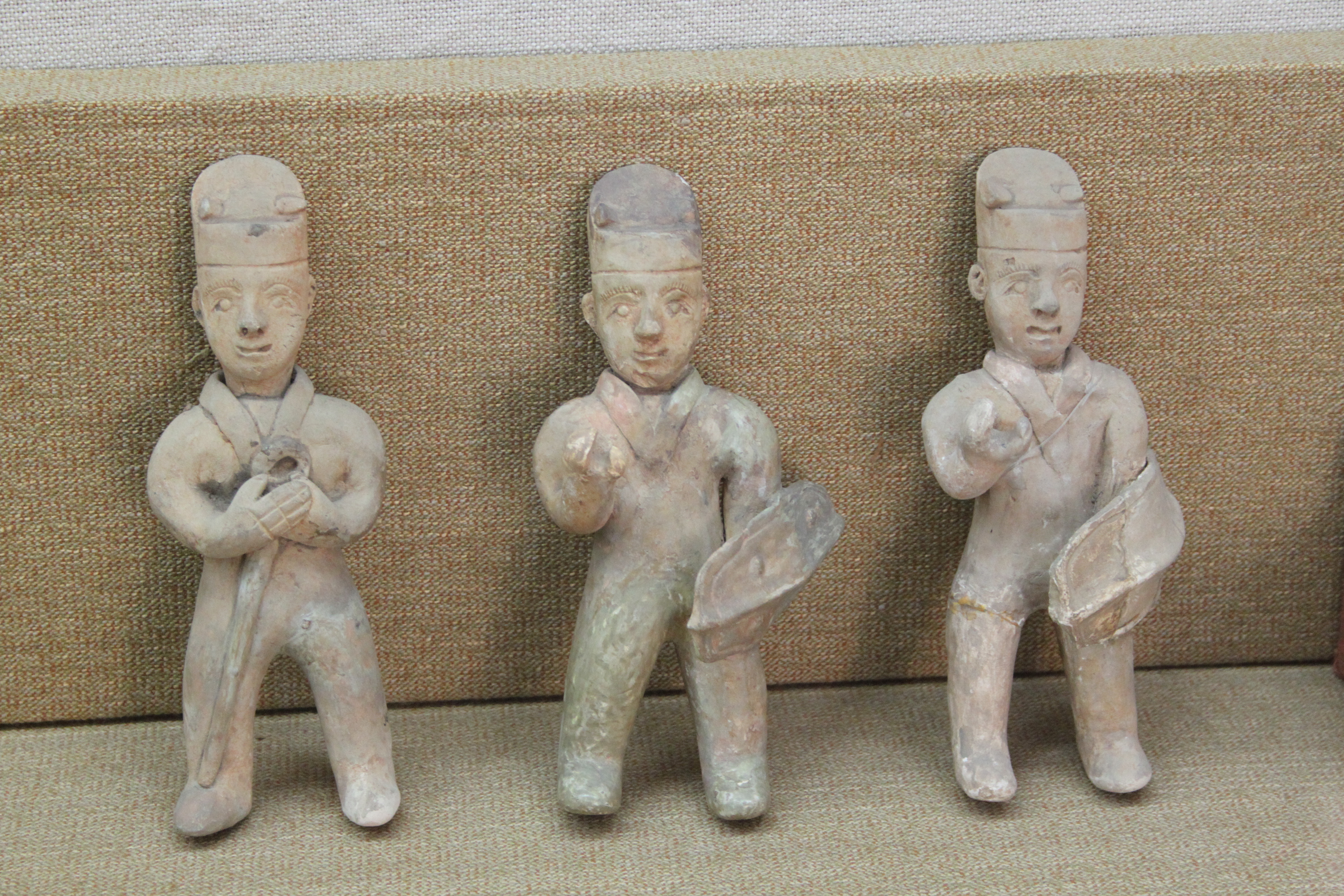
Jin soldiers holding shields.

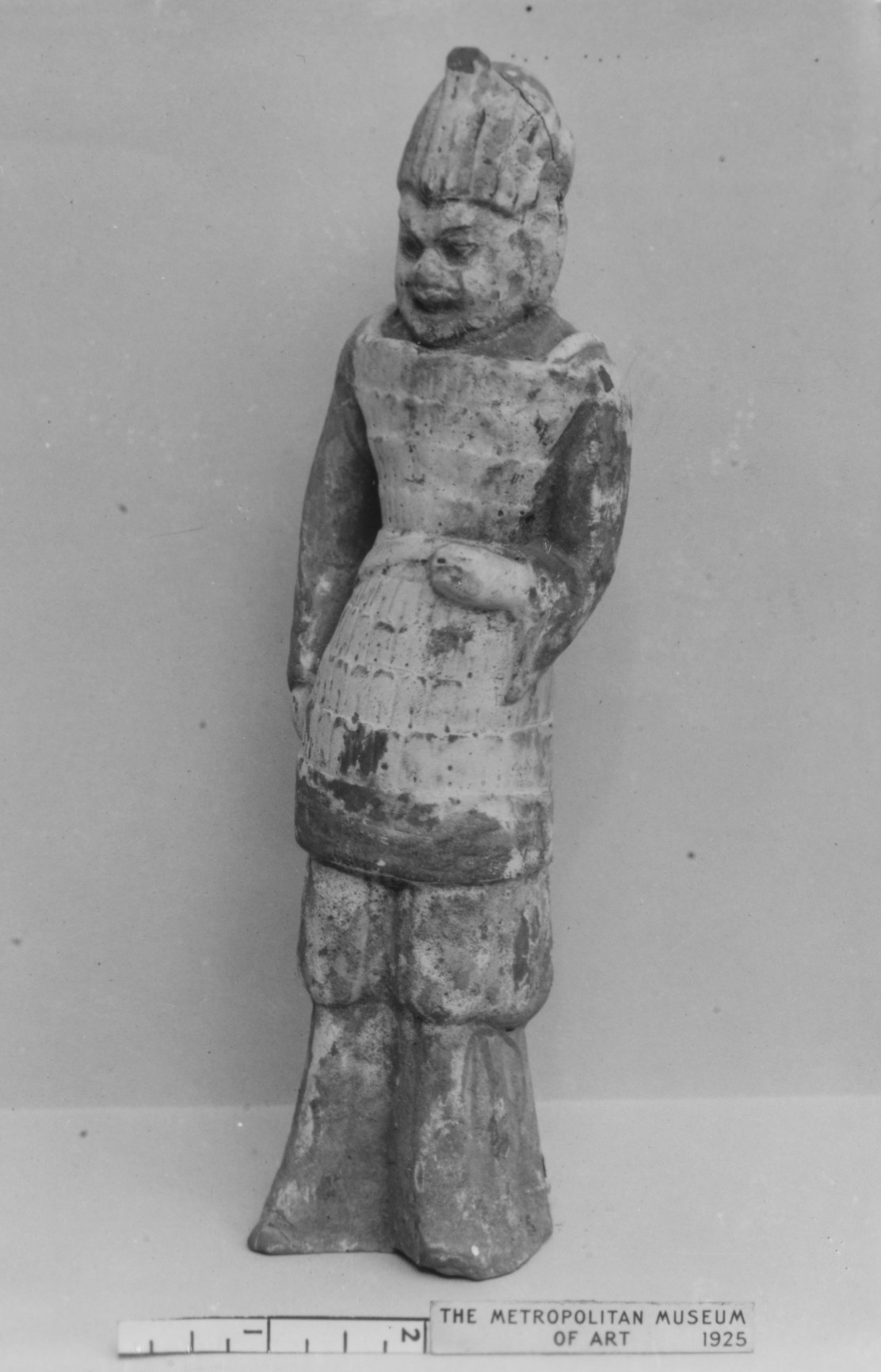
Jin dynasty infantry soldier

By the Three Kingdoms period many cavalrymen wore armour and some horses were equipped with their own armour as well. In one battle, the warlord Cao Cao boasted that with only ten sets of horse armour he had faced an enemy with three hundred sets. The horse armour may however have just been metal partial frontal barding or a mixture of metal and rawhide barding rather than fully comprehensive all metal barding.

References to "great shields" occur in their usage on the front line to protect spearmen and crossbowmen. Shields were also commonly paired with the single edged dao and used among cavalrymen. Descriptions of the Battle of Guandu mention that Cao Cao's soldiers employed shield cover above their heads each time they moved out into the open due to oppressive arrow fire from Yuan Shao's wooden towers.

==== Dark armour ====
A report in 231 AD mentions the capture of 5,000 suits of "dark armour" (xuan kai or xuan jia 玄鎧/玄甲) and 3,100 crossbows. Dark armour appears in Han texts as well, but only as the attire worn by honor guards at funeral processions. The only trait known about dark armour is that it reflected the sun's rays. This probably means dark armour was made of high-quality steel, which was often associated with black ferrous material.

==== Brilliant armour ====
Cao Zhi mentioned three different kinds of armour, two of which were variants of "brilliant" armour:

The Previous Emperor presented your vassal with armor (kai), to wit, a suit of "black-brilliant" (heiguang) and one of "bright-brilliant" (mingguang) and a suit of "double-faced" (liangtang) armor, but now that the present age is peaceful and the weapons and armor (bingge) are not of use, I request leave to turn them all over to the Armor Board (kaicao) to be taken care of.

— Cao Zhi

Brilliant armour was made of decarburized steel, which shines blue-black when polished, giving it its name. Chen Lin described brilliant armour in the following manner:

As for the armor (kai) then like that of Quegong of the Eastern Barbarians,
It is made of the finest steel refined a hundred times;
The armorer has plied his hammer,
The leather-worker has made the stitching;
[Adorned with] dark feathers the flashing armor (jia)
Gleams and shines, throwing off light.

— Chen Lin

=== Jin dynasty and the Sixteen Kingdoms (265–439) ===
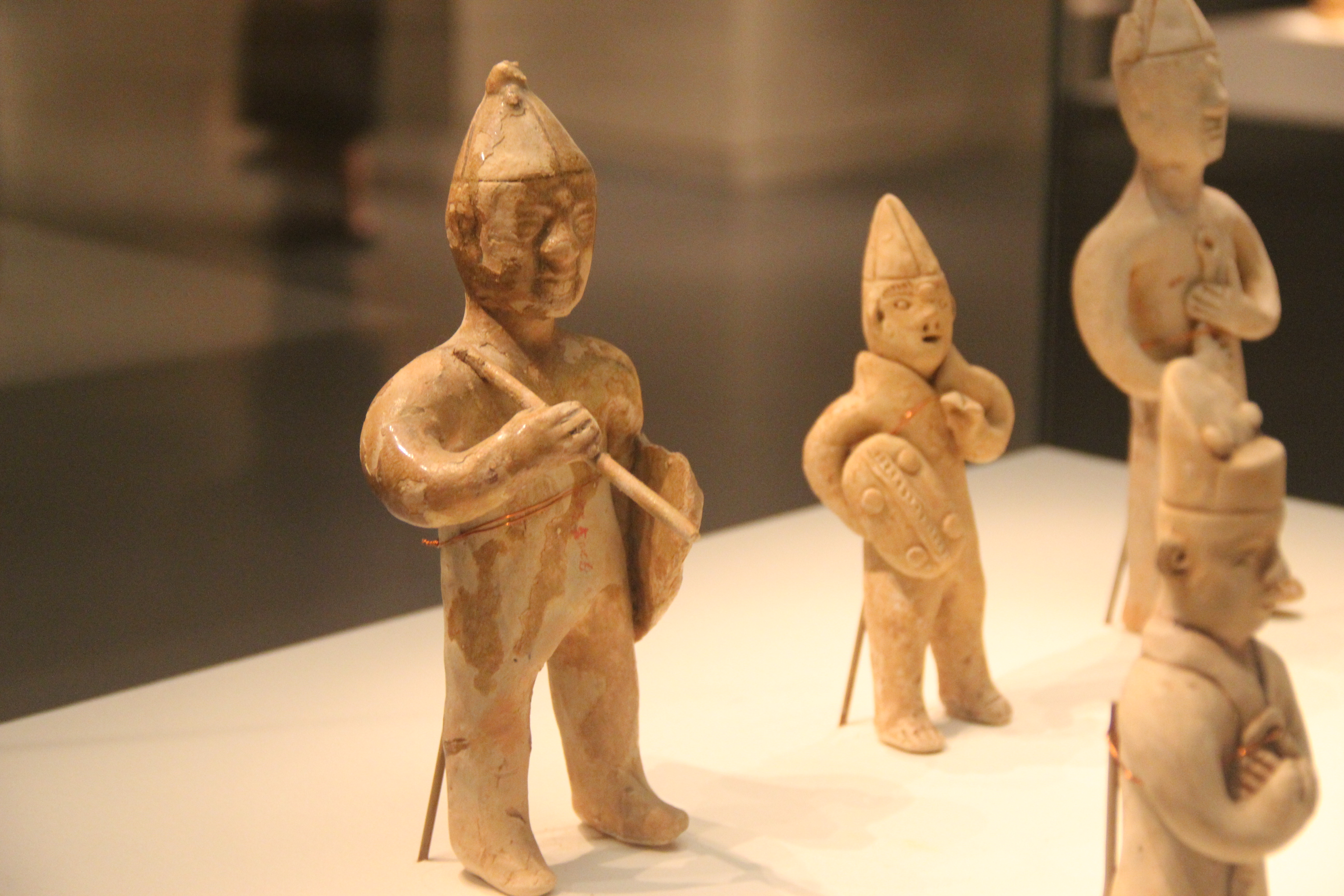
Jin dynasty (266–420) soldiers with spear and shield

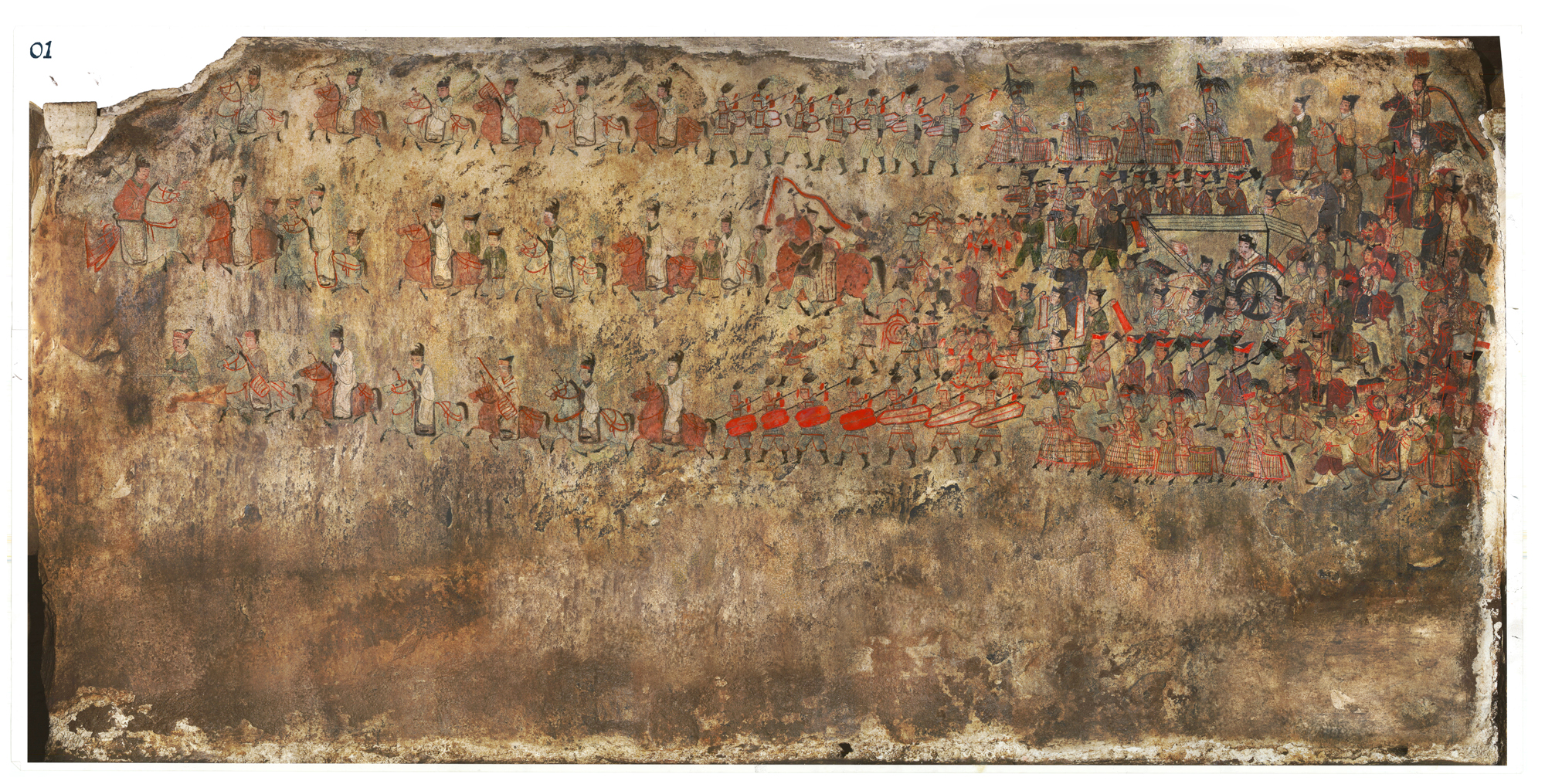
Cavalry in procession, from the tomb of Dong Shou, a Former Yan emigre, Goguryeo

Fully comprehensive metal horse armour covering the horse's entire body appeared in northeastern China in the mid-4th century during the Eastern Jin dynasty, probably as a result of Xianbei influence. By the end of the 4th century, murals depicting horse armour covering the entire body were found in tombs as far as Yunnan.

By the early years of the fourth century the numbers have increased enormously, with the sources mentioning the capture of thousands of “armored horses” in a single battle. A pictoral representation dated to 357 shows us a fully armored warrior: “The body of the rider is almost completely covered by armor. He wears a plumed helmet that protects the sides and back of the head, a habergeon with high neck and shoulder guards, and chaps. The armor was made of lamellar plate, but one cannot say whether of iron or of lacquered leather. The bardings almost completely cover the horse and include a chanfron of distinctive shape.”

— David A. Graff

Sources mention the capture of thousands of "armored horses" in a single battle.

==== Five colored armour ====
Shi Hu's bodyguard was said to have worn "fine five-colored armour" (wuse xikai), which was so dazzling it blinded the eye. This was probably similar in construction to brilliant armour.

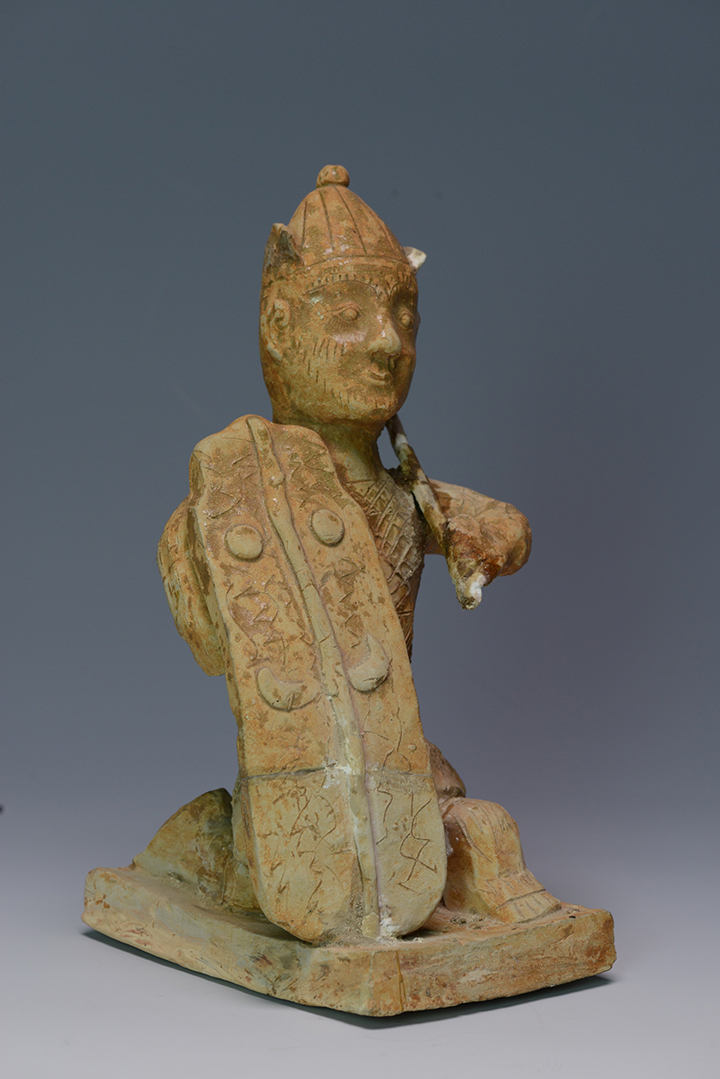
Wei or Jin shieldbearer

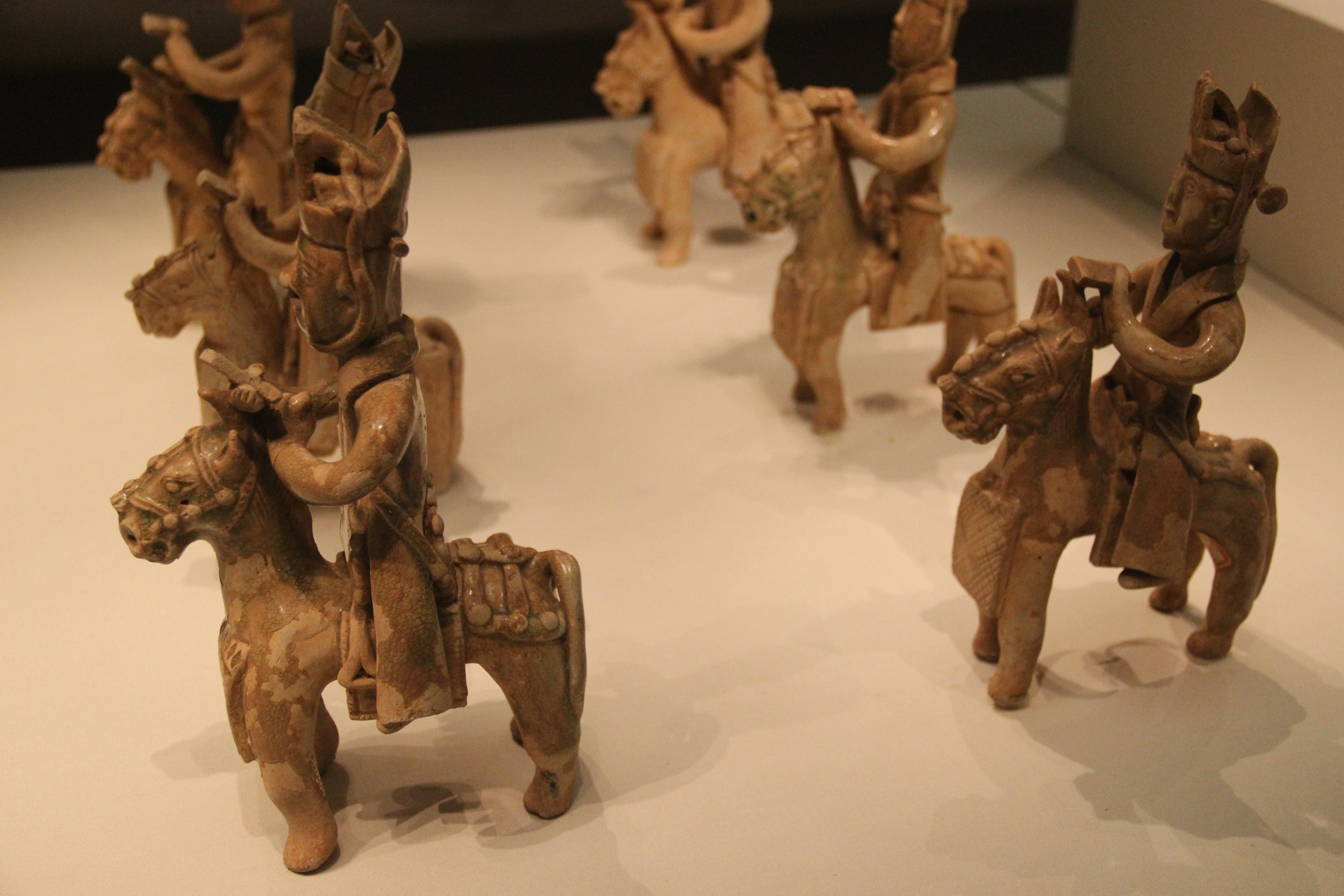
Jin cavalry with single mounting stirrup

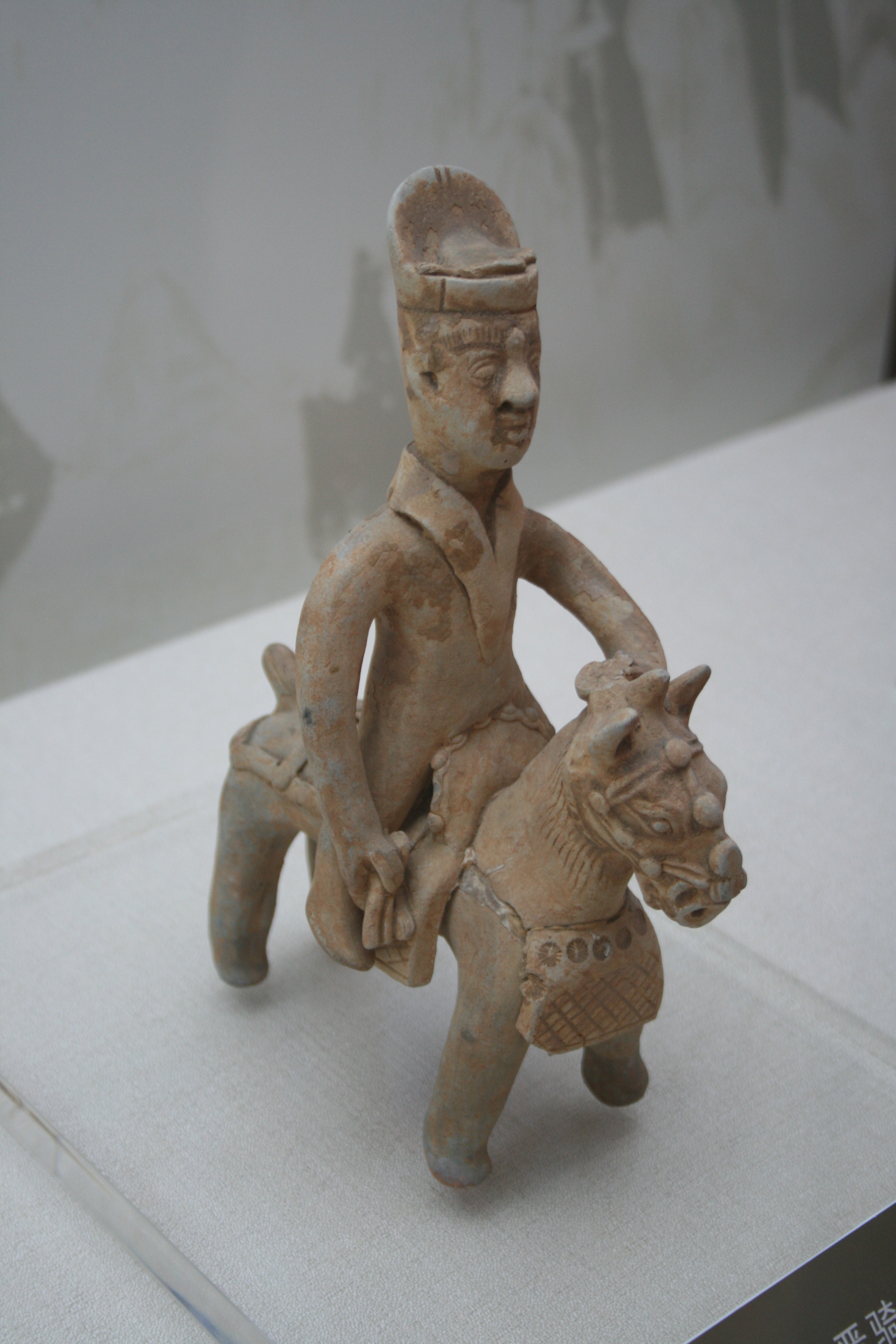
Western Jin rider

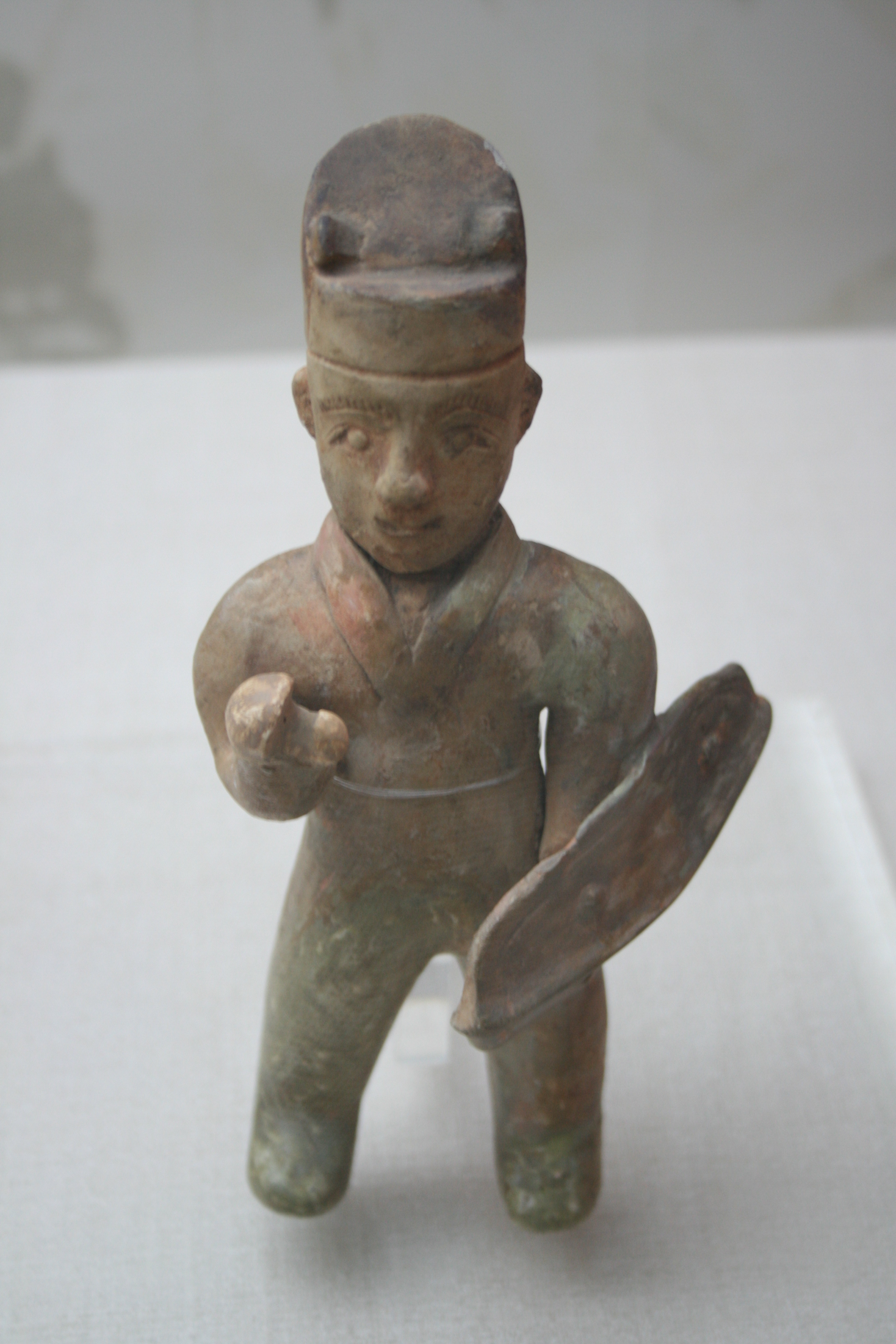
Jin soldier with shield

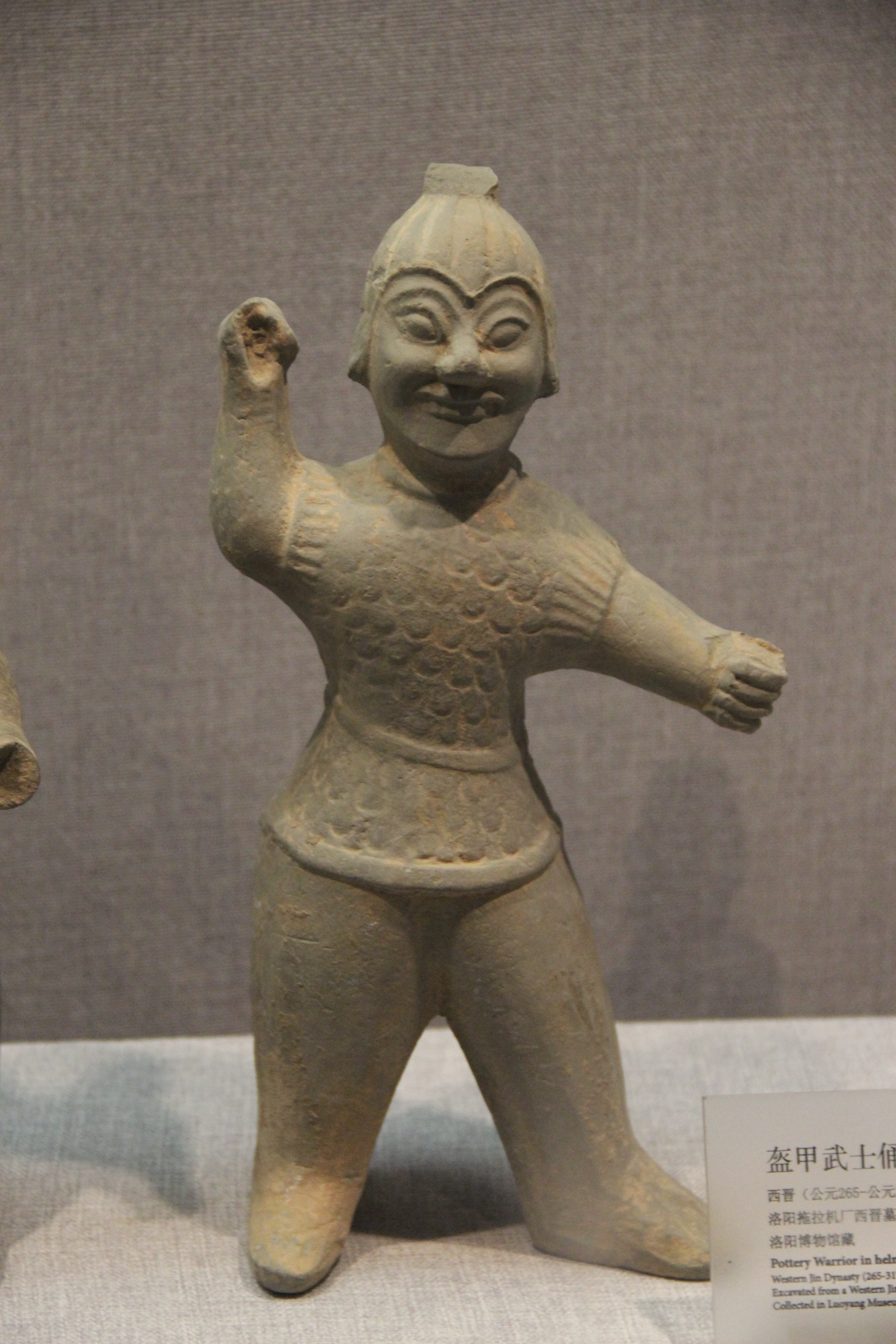
Jin pottery soldier

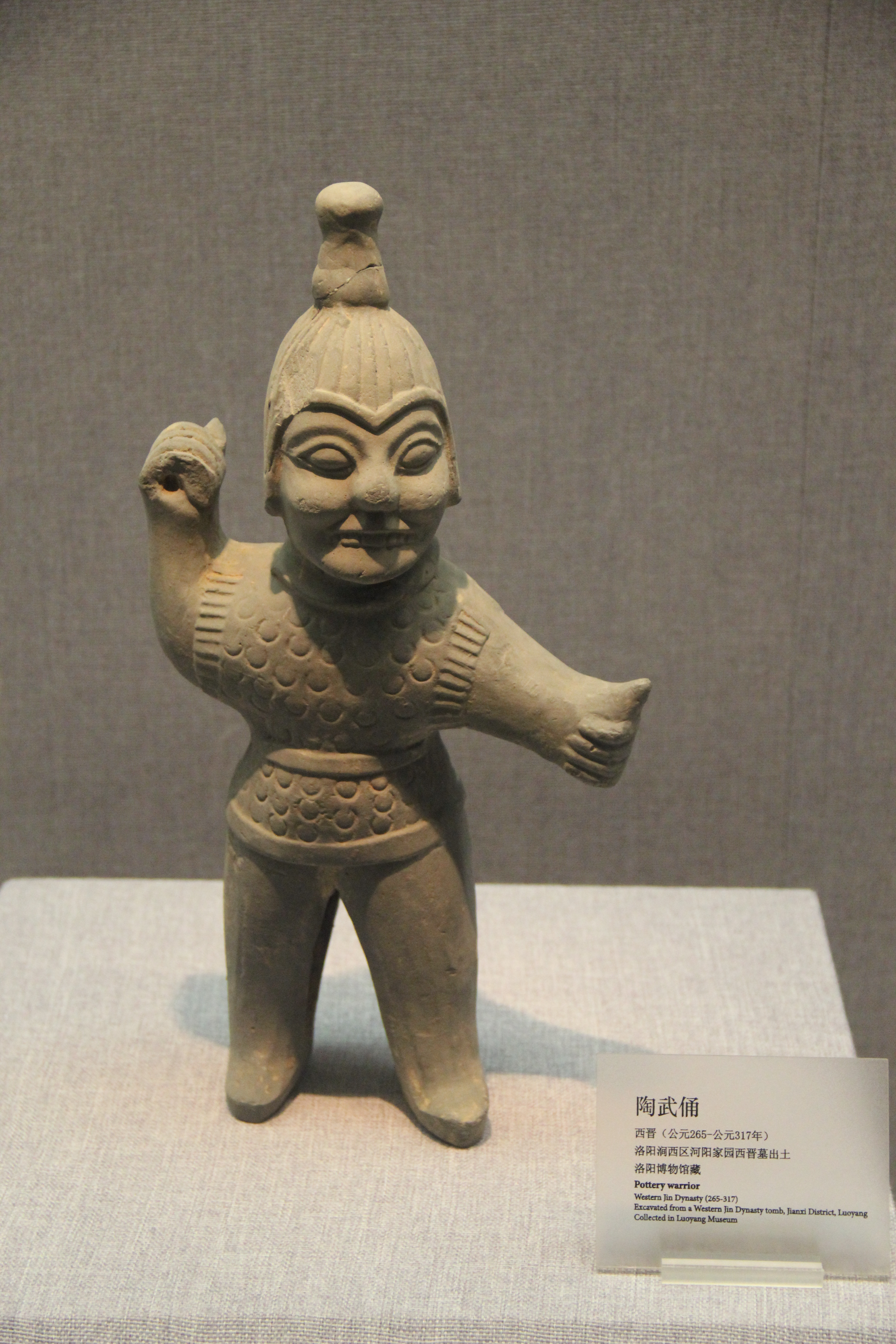
Jin pottery soldier

=== Northern and Southern dynasties (420–589) ===
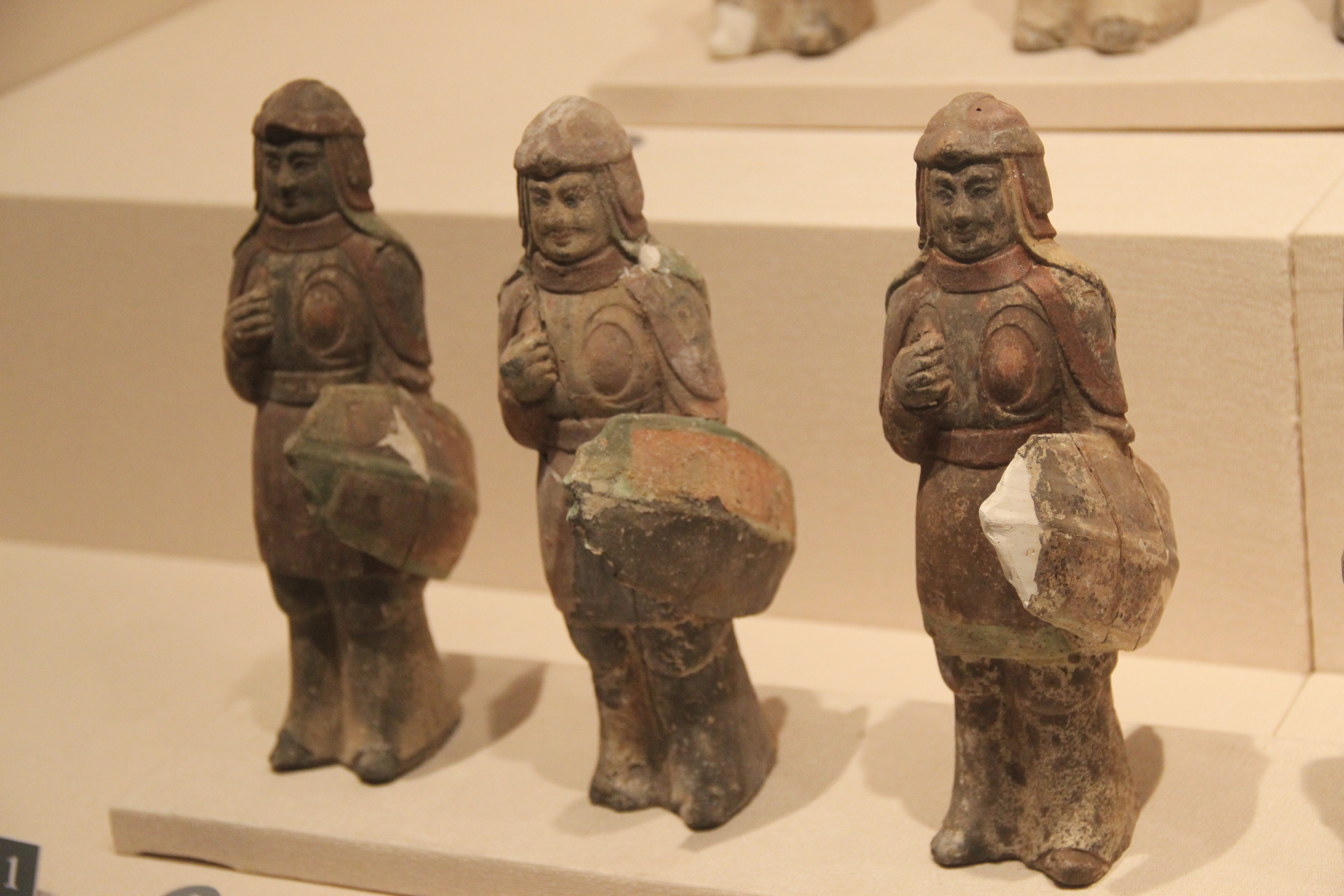
Northern Qi soldiers carrying shields

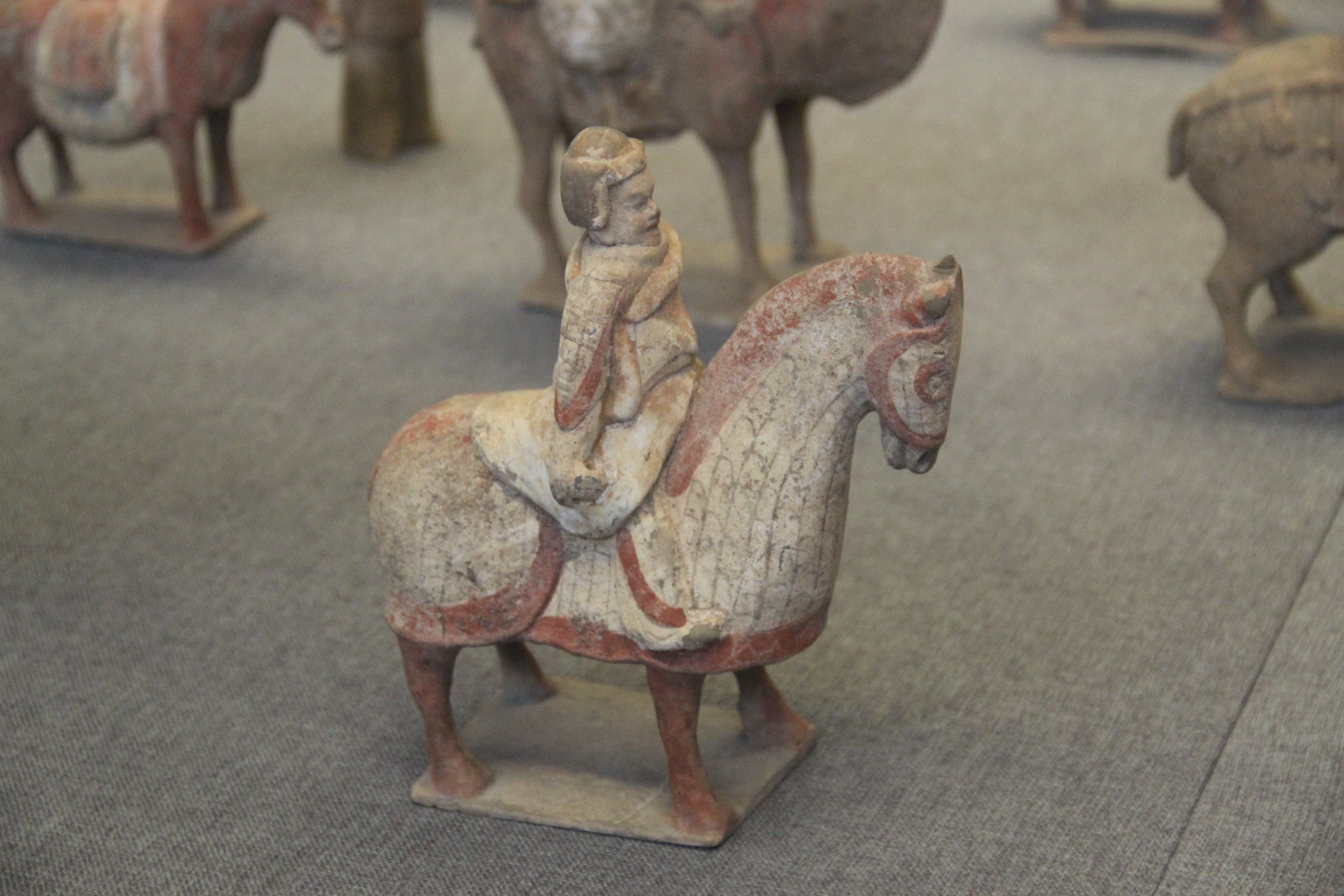
Northern Wei horseman

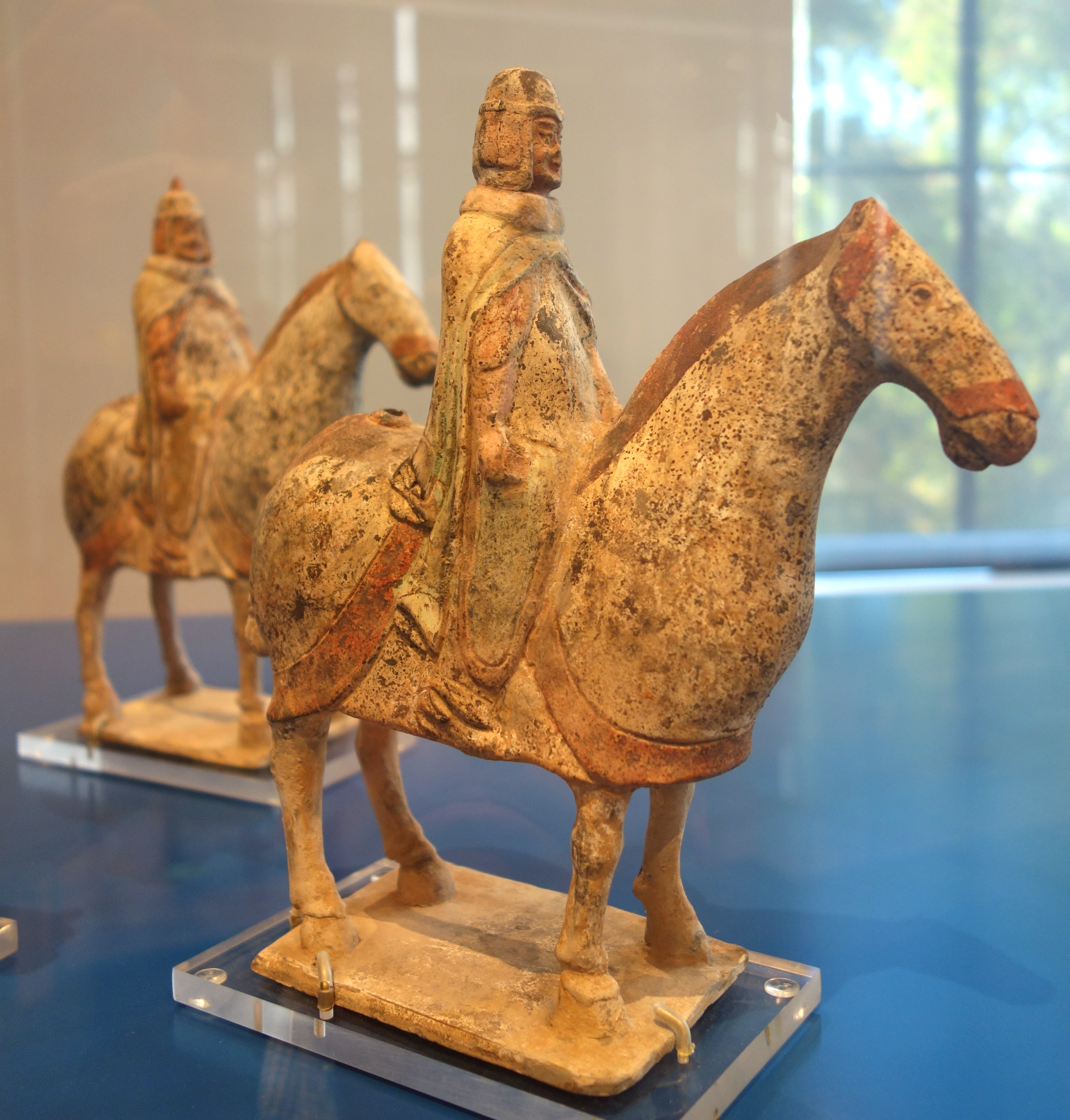
Cavalry of Northern Wei.

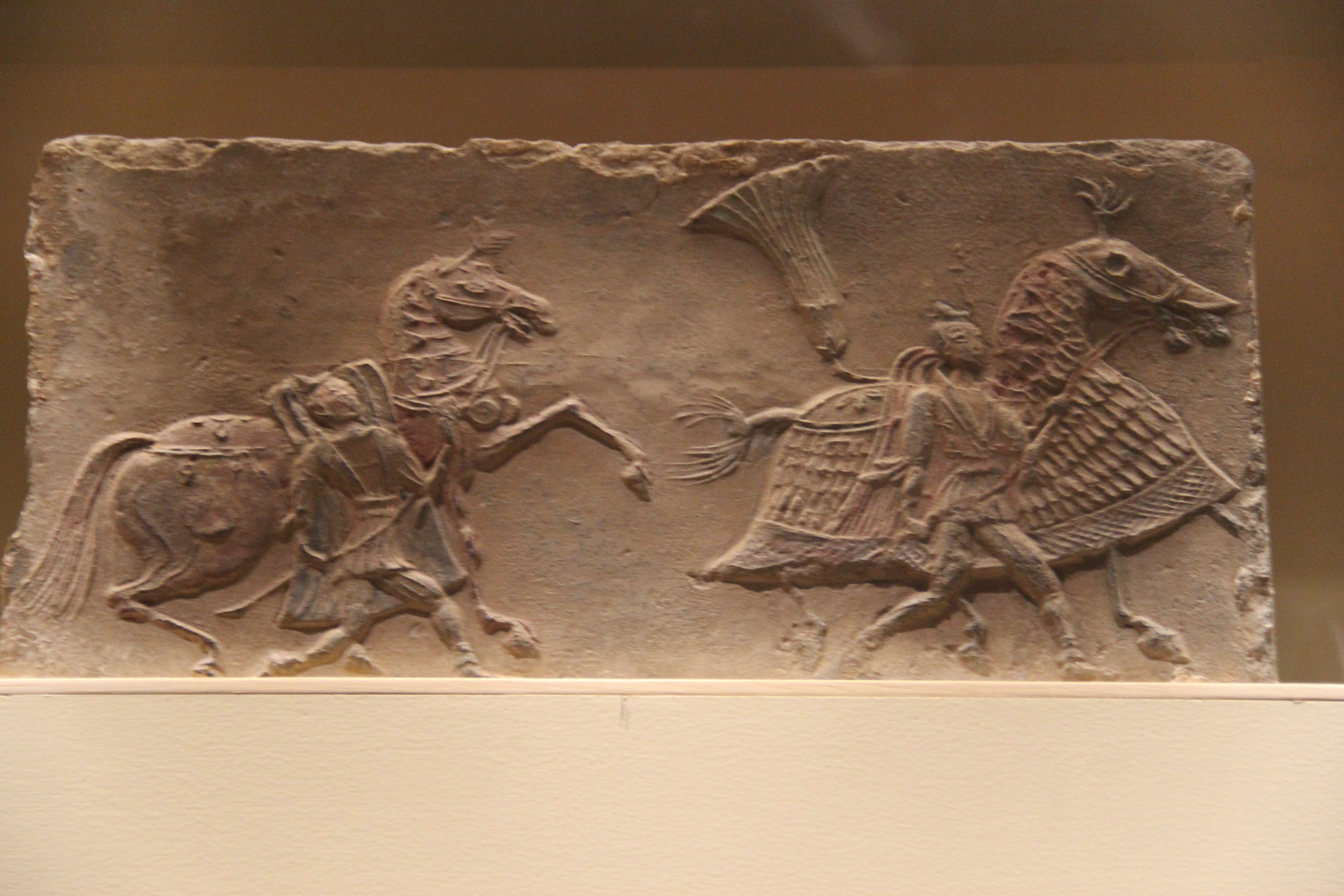
Cavalry of the Southern dynasties.

==== Cord and plaque ====
During the Northern and Southern dynasties period (420–589), a style of armour called "cord and plaque" became popular, as did shields and long swords. "Cord and plaque" armour consisted of double breast plates in the front and back held together, sometimes on a frame, by two shoulder straps and waist cords, worn over the usual lamellar armour. "Cord and plaque" wearing figurines are also often depicted holding an oval or rectangular shield and a long sword. Types of armour had also apparently become distinct enough for there to be separate categories for light and heavy armour.

Bright brilliant armour continued to be prominent. In 518 AD, the Northern Wei court gave a visiting Avar chieftain a set of fine bright brilliant cavalry armour and six sets of iron cavalry armour. Deployment of armoured cavalry was common for the Northern Wei, especially among the "iron-clad" Erzhu tribe who specialized in armoured cavalry. References to heavy cavalry as "iron horses" occur in the poetry of Lu Chui. In 543 AD, the Western Wei general Cai Yu came to be known as "iron tiger" for his distinctive bright brilliant armour.

The elite guards of the Liang dynasty (502–557) were equipped with helmets, uniforms, and armour that "trimmed in gold and silver and glistening under the sun's glare," cost in all some several hundred thousand coppers for each soldier. The display reportedly sapped the spirits of Jin warriors, although the Jin commander Zhou Dewei said they were "more intent on posing than engaging the enemy."

==== Banded armour ====
The earliest depictions of "banded" armour have been found in bronze figurines made by the Dian Kingdom that existed from 279 BCE to 109 BCE. Later banded armor also appears in Northern and Southern dynasties and Tang era art. This type of armour was built up of long horizontal bands or plates, similar to the lorica segmentata. The imperial guards of the Jurchen Jin dynasty have been described wearing banded armour. The left guards wore blue banded armour and held yellow dragon flags while the right guards wore red banded armour and held red dragon flags. Banded armour is even more rarely depicted than the elusive mountain pattern armour or mail armour.

==== Co-fusion steel weapons on armour ====
In the 6th century, Qimu Huaiwen introduced to Northern Qi the process of 'co-fusion' steel-making, which used metals of different carbon contents to create steel. Apparently sabers made using this method were capable of penetrating 30 armour lamellae. It's not clear if the armour was of iron or leather.

Huaiwen made sabres [dao 刀] of 'overnight iron' [su tie 宿鐵]. His method was to anneal [shao 燒] powdered cast iron [sheng tie jing 生鐵精] with layers of soft [iron] blanks [ding 鋌, presumably thin plates]. After several days the result is steel [gang 剛]. Soft iron was used for the spine of the sabre, He washed it in the urine of the Five Sacrificial Animals and quench-hardened it in the fat of the Five Sacrificial Animals: [Such a sabre] could penetrate thirty armour lamellae [zha 札]. The 'overnight soft blanks' [Su rou ting 宿柔鋌] cast today [in the Sui period?] by the metallurgists of Xiangguo (襄國) represent a vestige of [Qiwu Huaiwen's] technique. The sabres which they make are still extremely sharp, but they cannot penetrate thirty lamellae.

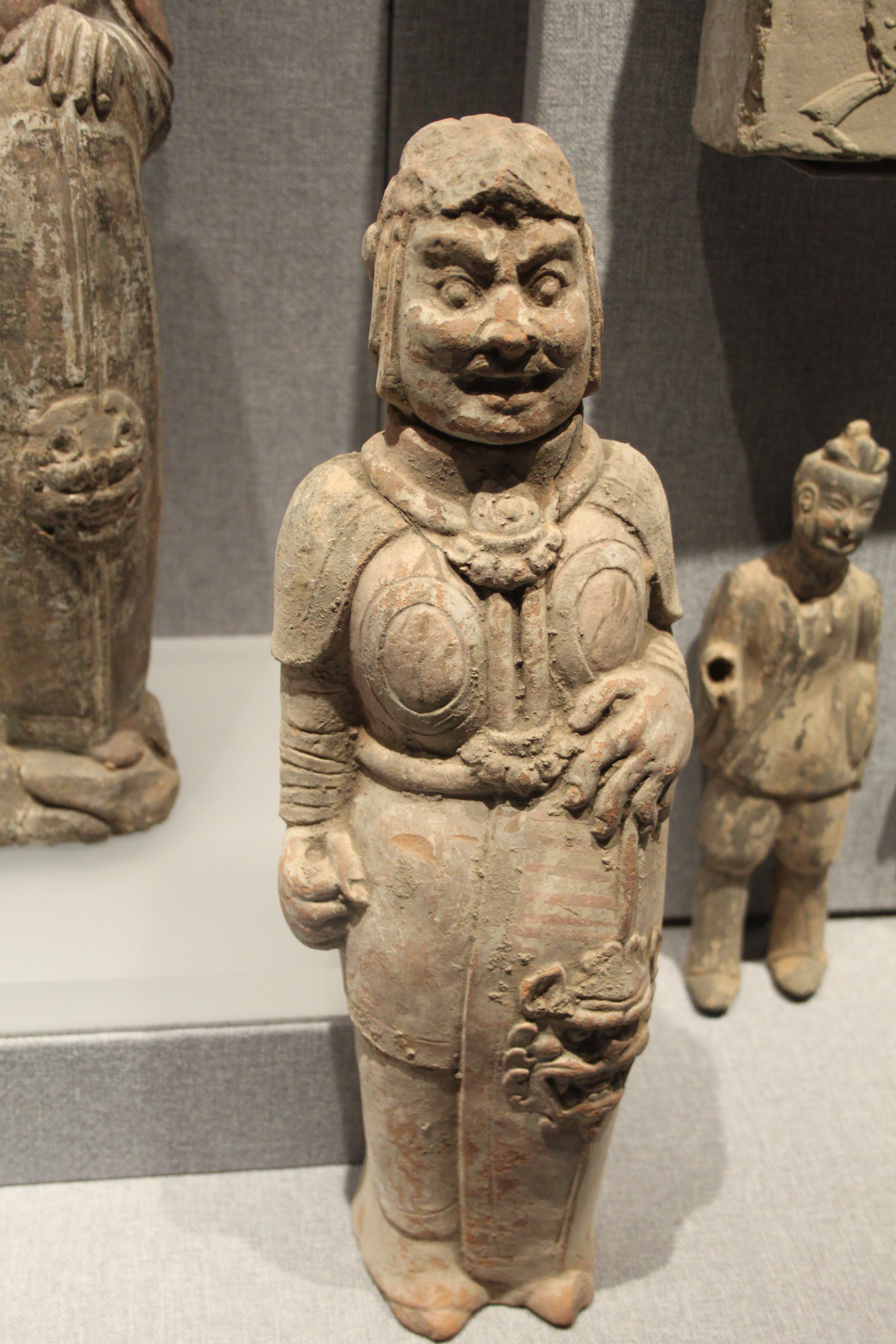
NS dynasties shieldbearer in "cord and plaque" armour

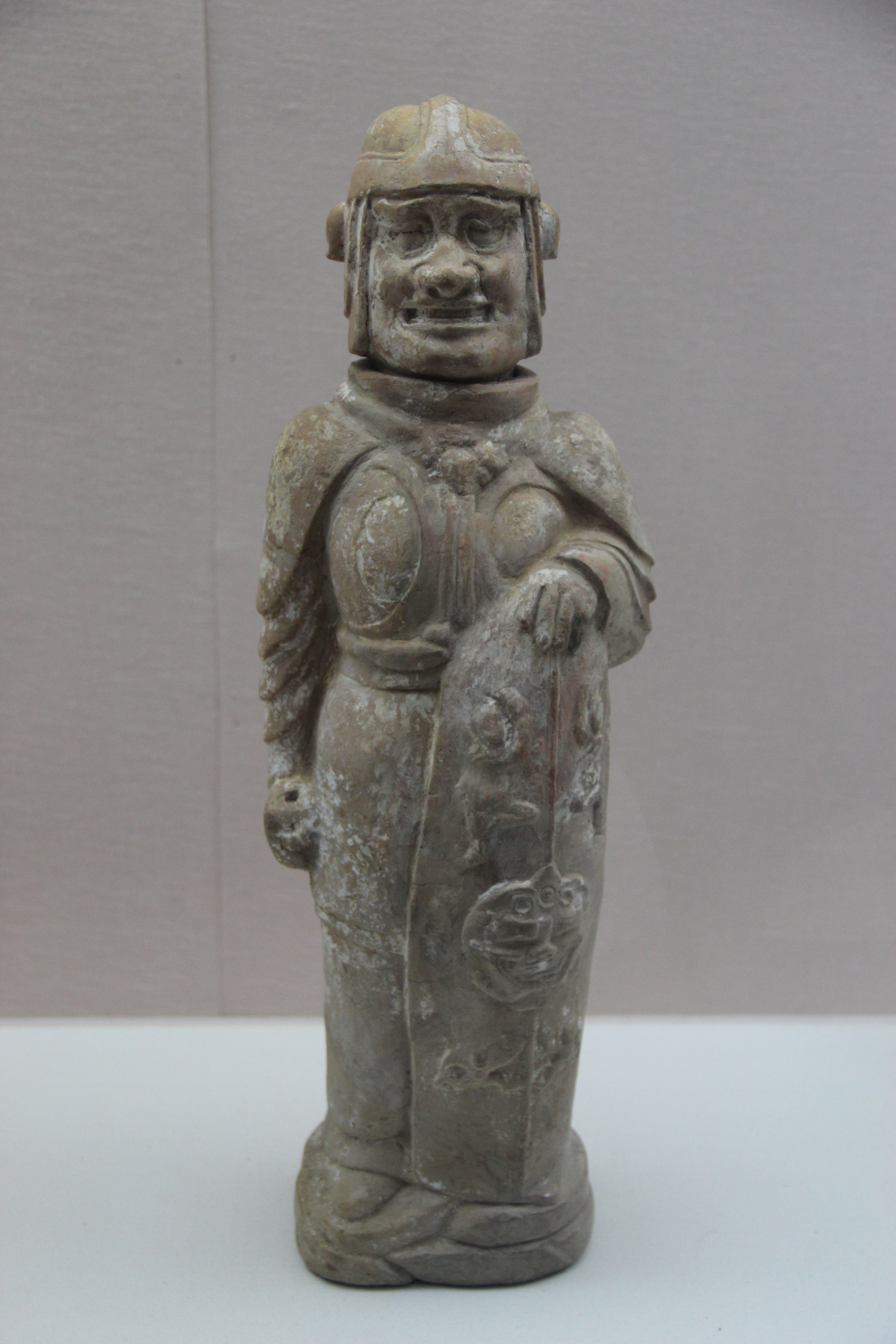
Northern Qi soldier

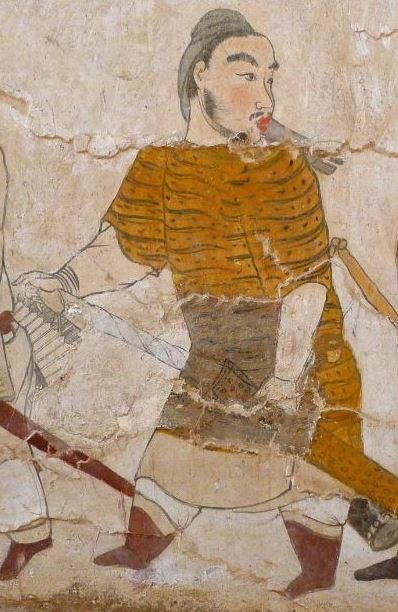
Northern Qi soldier wearing banded armour

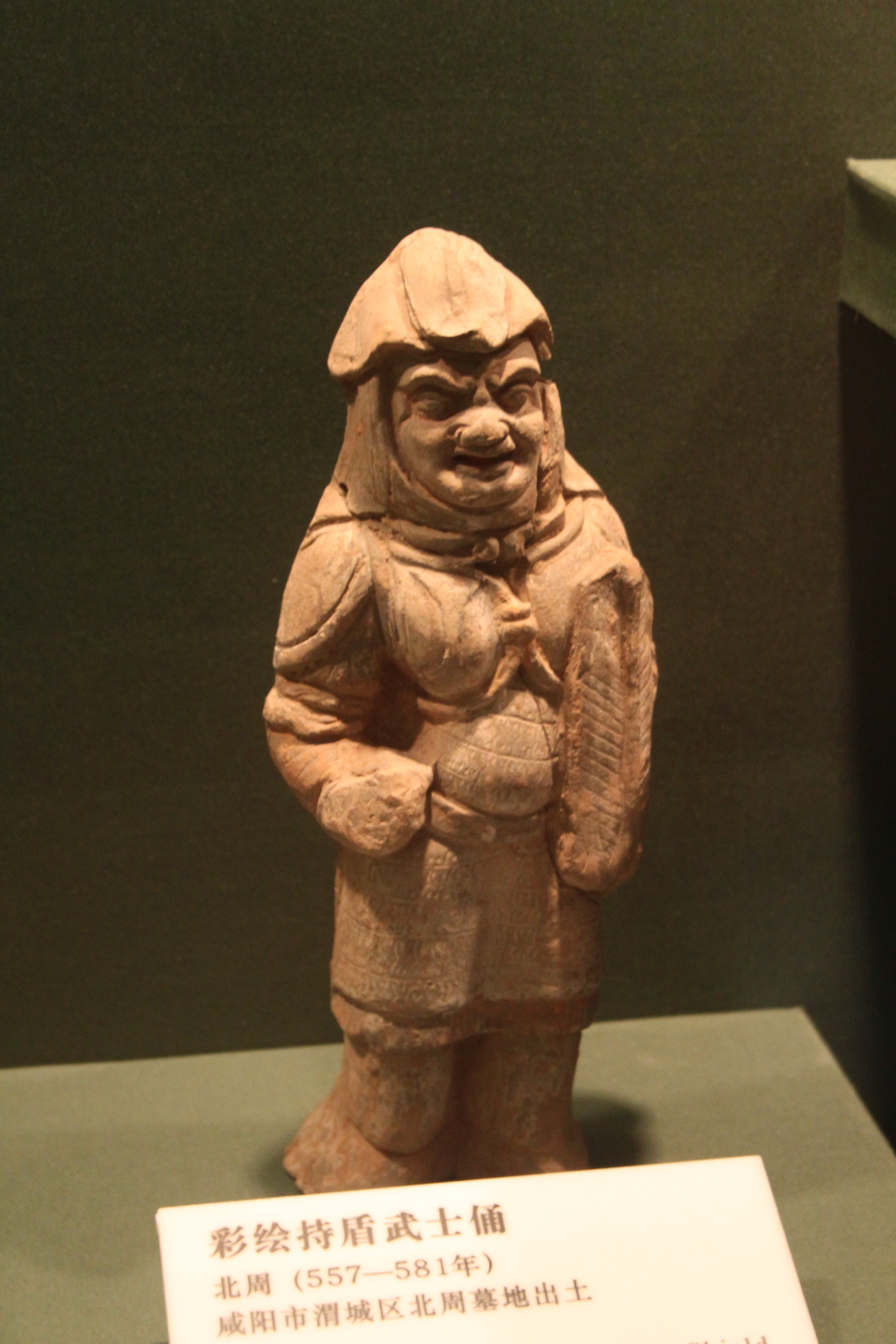
NS dynasties shieldbearer

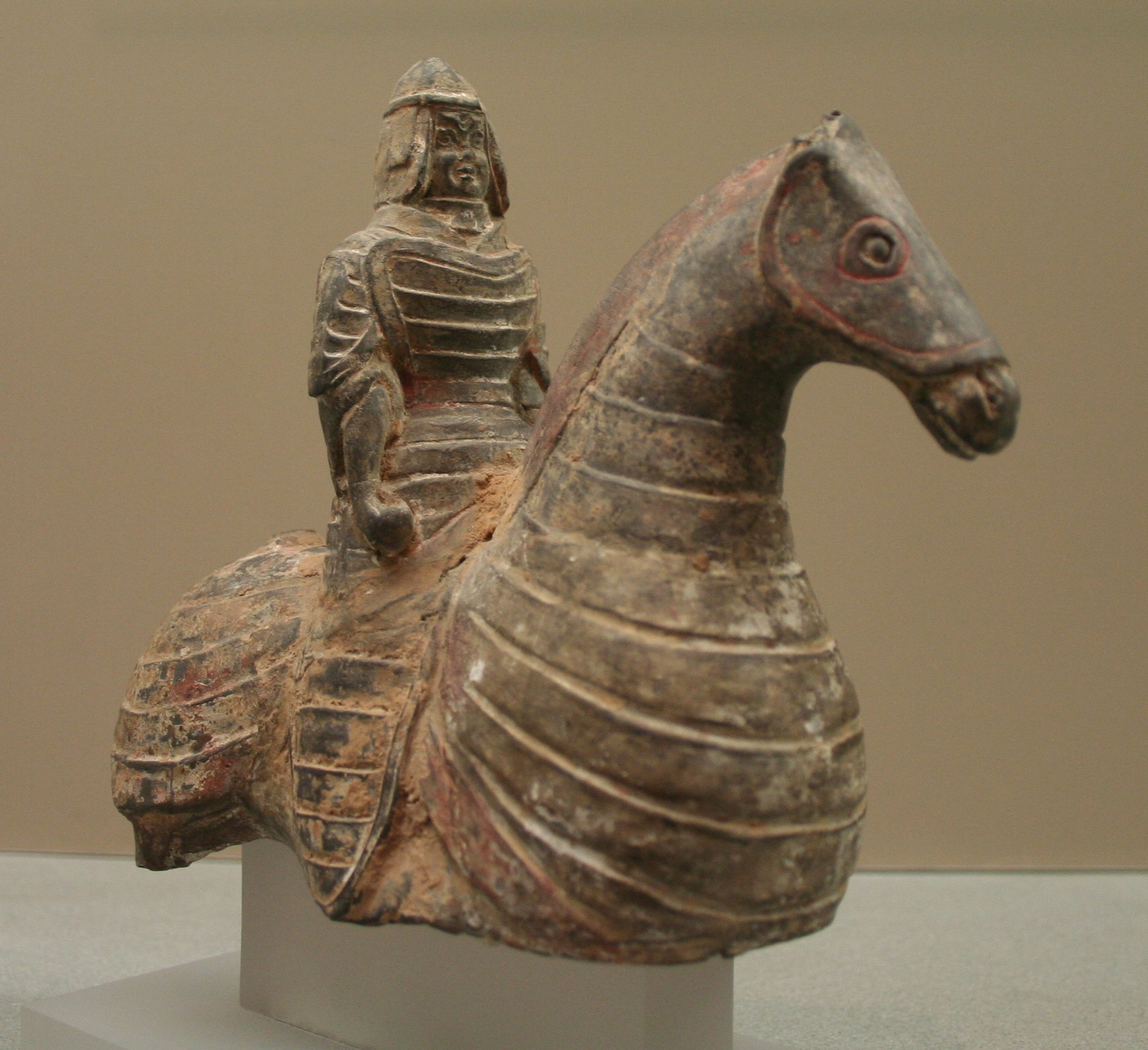
Northern Wei heavy cavalry funerary figurine.

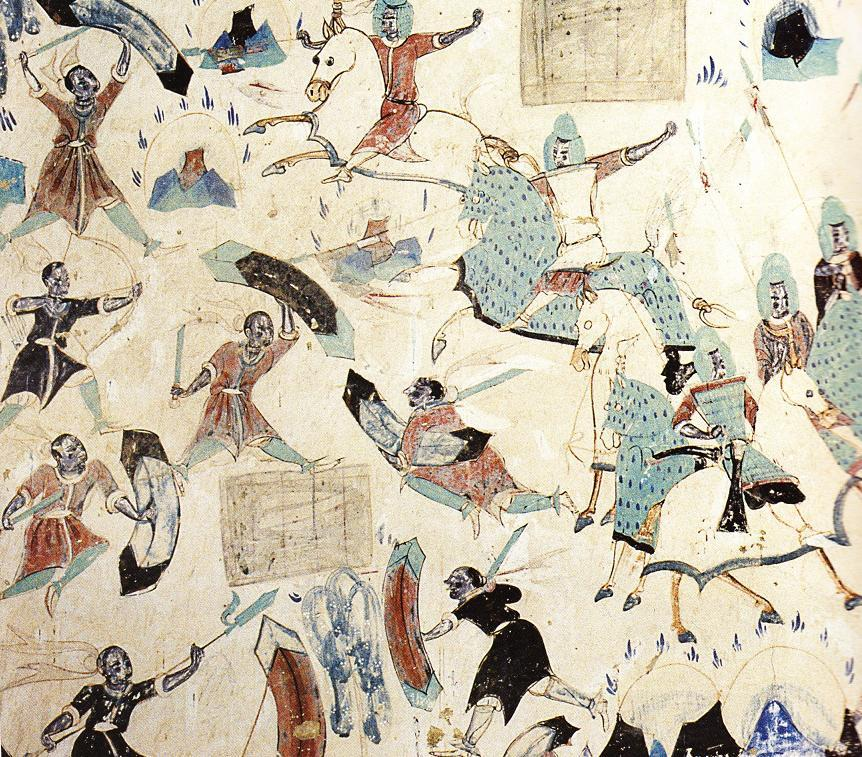
Western Wei cavalry

== Medieval armour ==
=== Sui dynasty (581–618) ===
The Sui dynasty made prodigious use of heavy cavalry. Both men and horses were heavily armoured. Armoured Sui horsemen found it difficult to engage with lighter Turkic cavalry on the steppes. They were mainly used to break infantry formations.

The Book of Sui provides an account of the cavalry battalions of the dynasty's 24 armies. The first battalion wore "bright-brilliant" (mingguang) armour made of decarburized steel connected by dark green cords, their horses wore iron armour with dark green tassels, and they were distinguished by lion banners. The second battalion wore armour of vermillion leather joined with red cords, their horse armour had an animal pattern with red tassels, and their unit flag was a panther-like beast. Other battalions were also distinguished by their own colors, patterns, and flags, but neither the bright-brilliant armour or iron armour are mentioned.

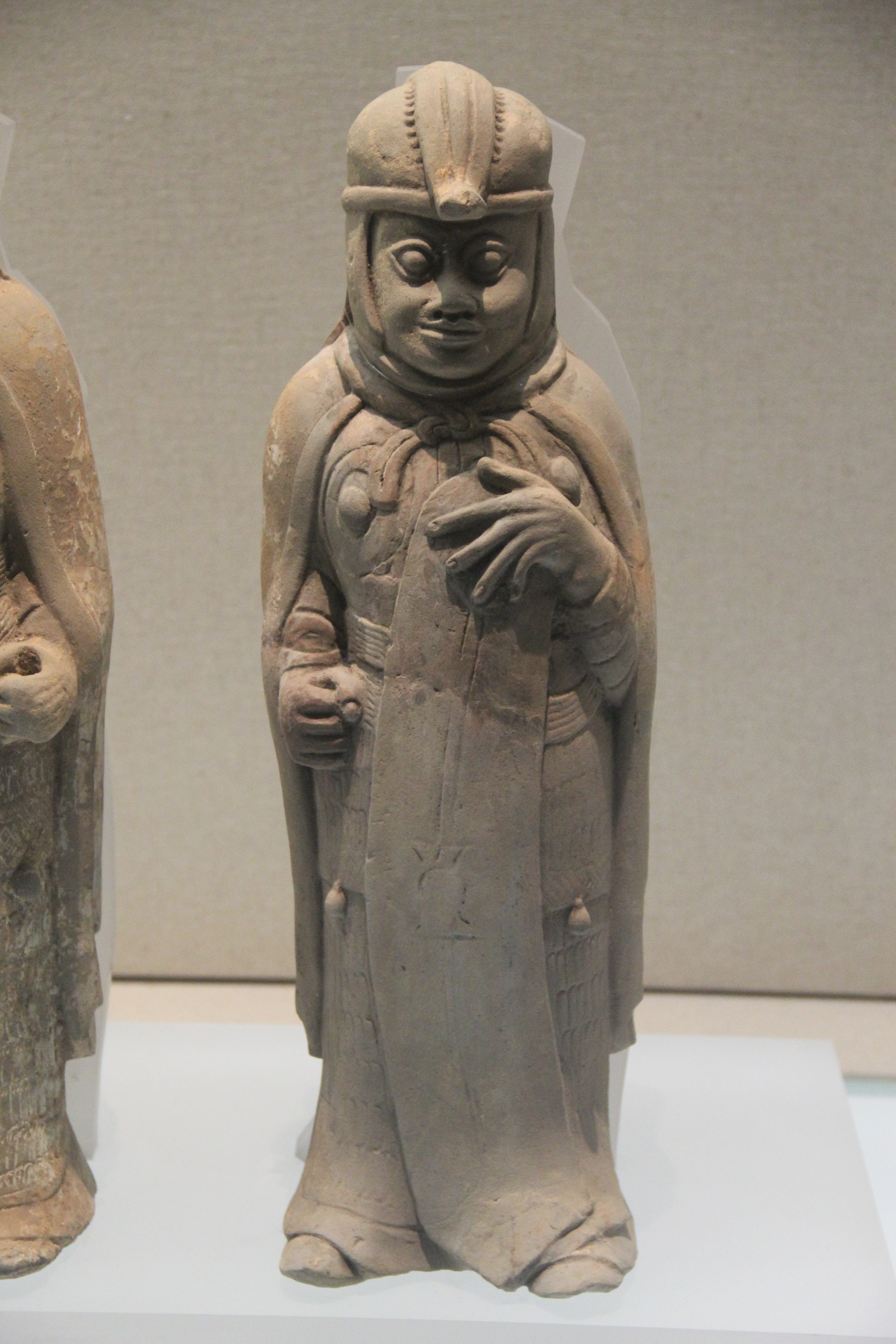
Sui warrior with shield

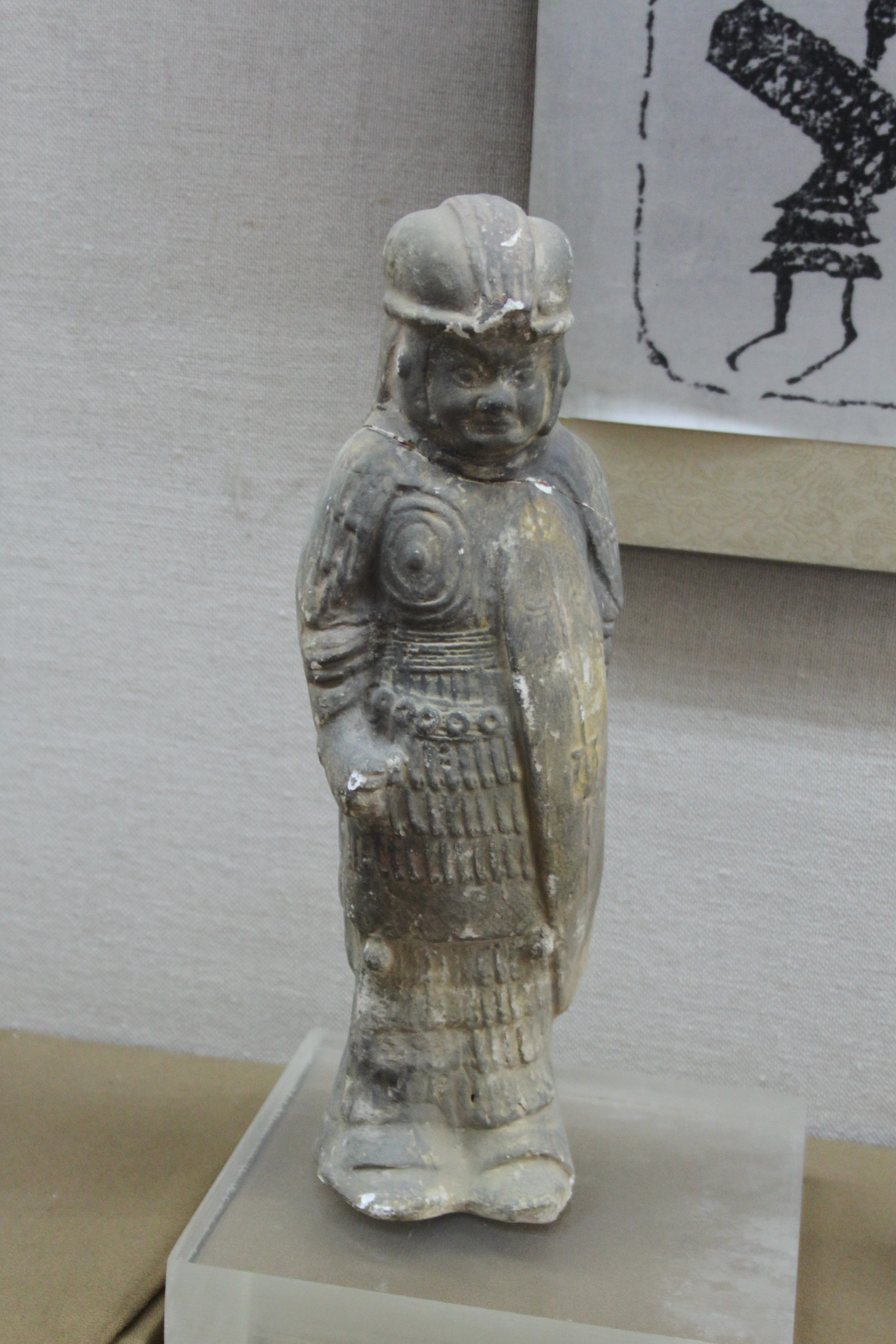
Sui soldier with shield

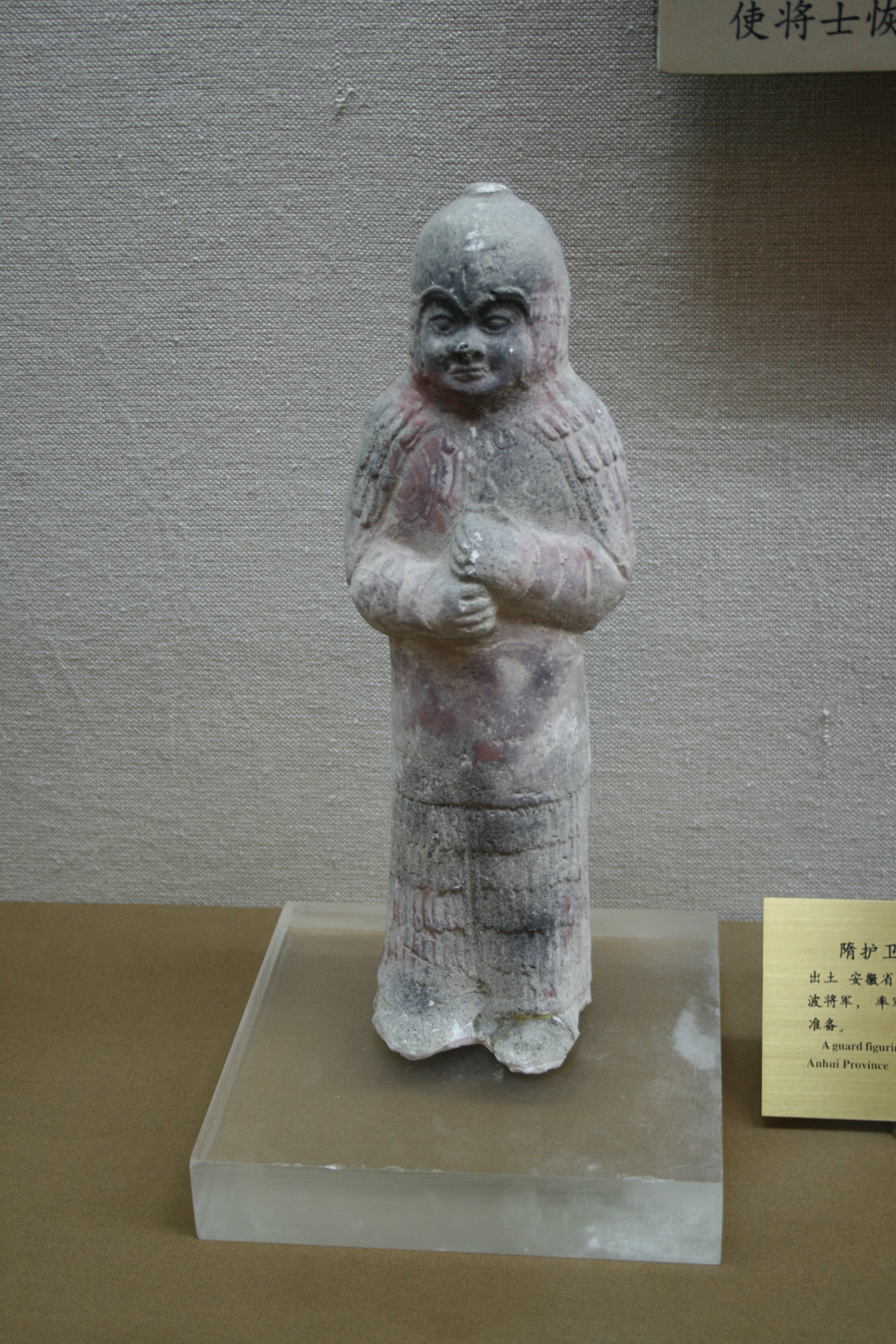
Sui soldier

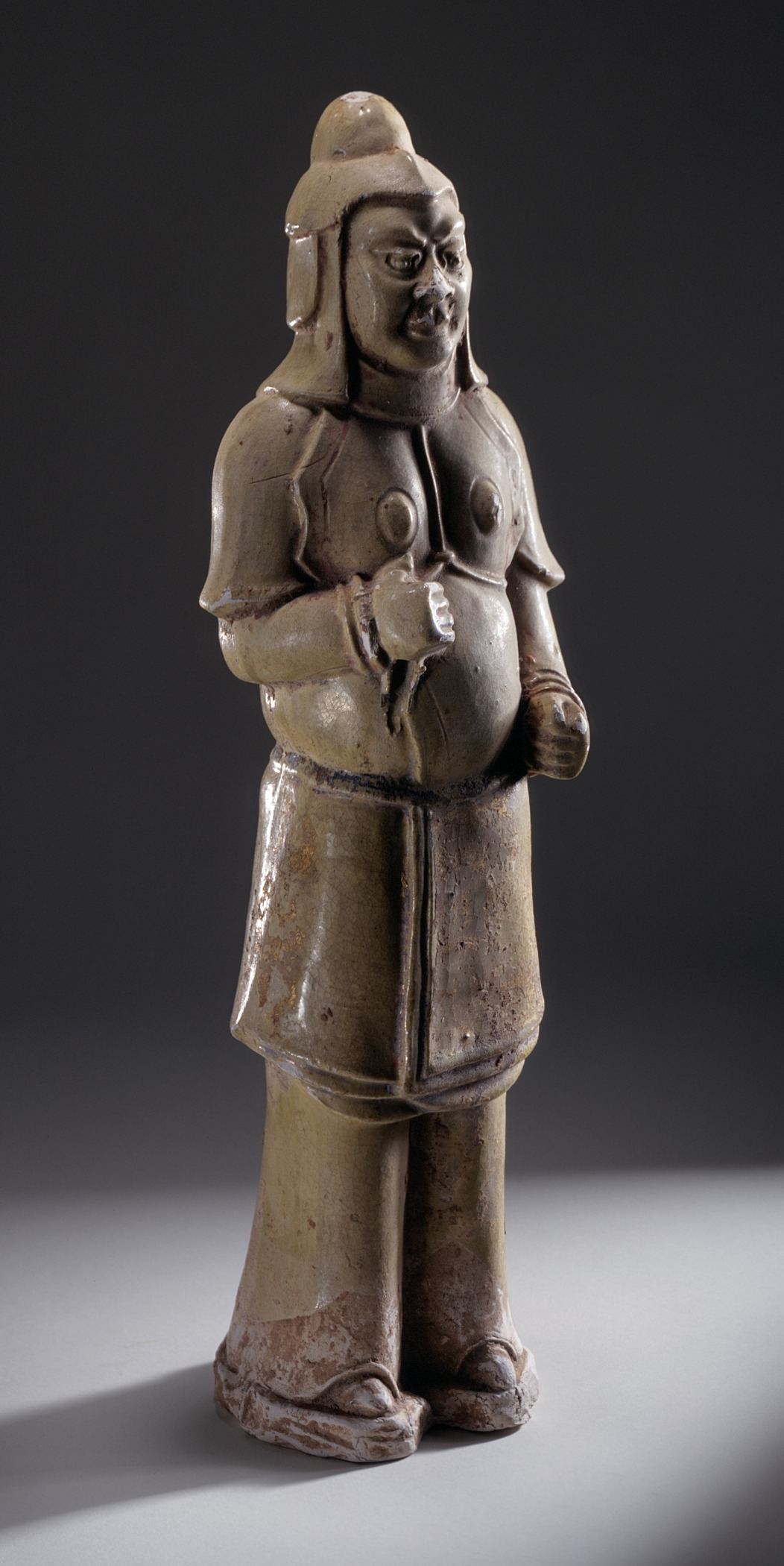
Sui soldier

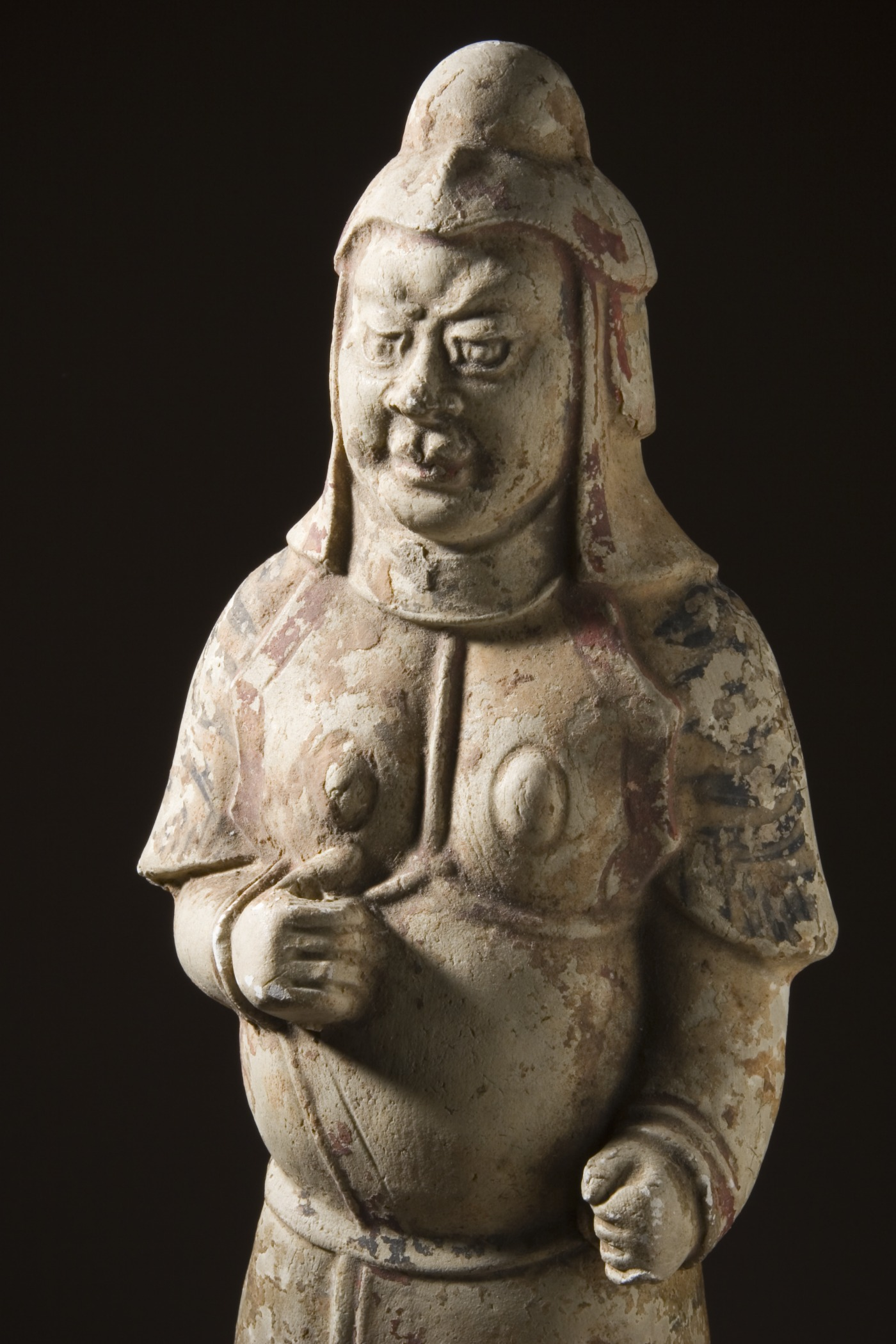
Sui soldier

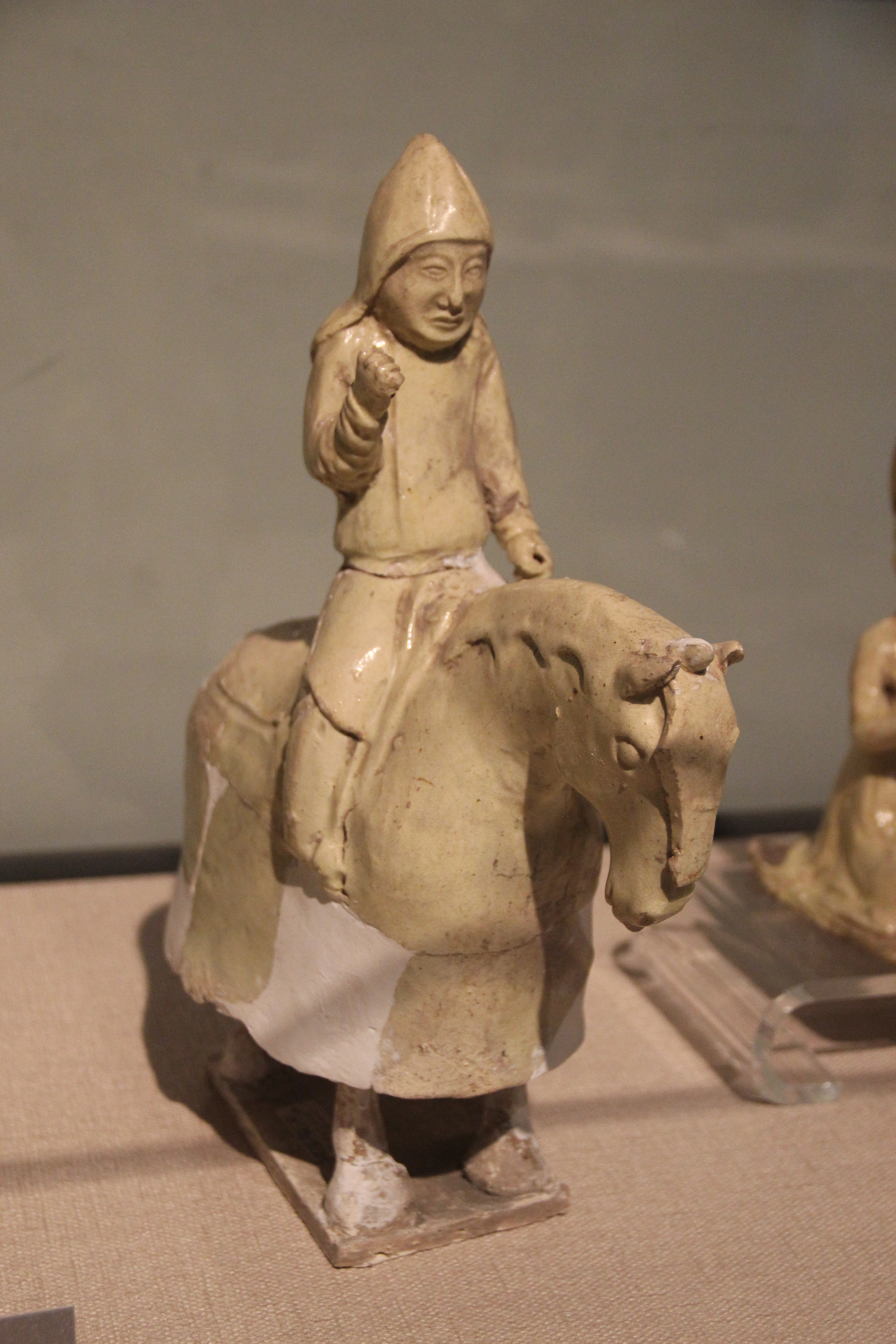
Sui armoured cavalry

=== Tang dynasty (618–907) ===
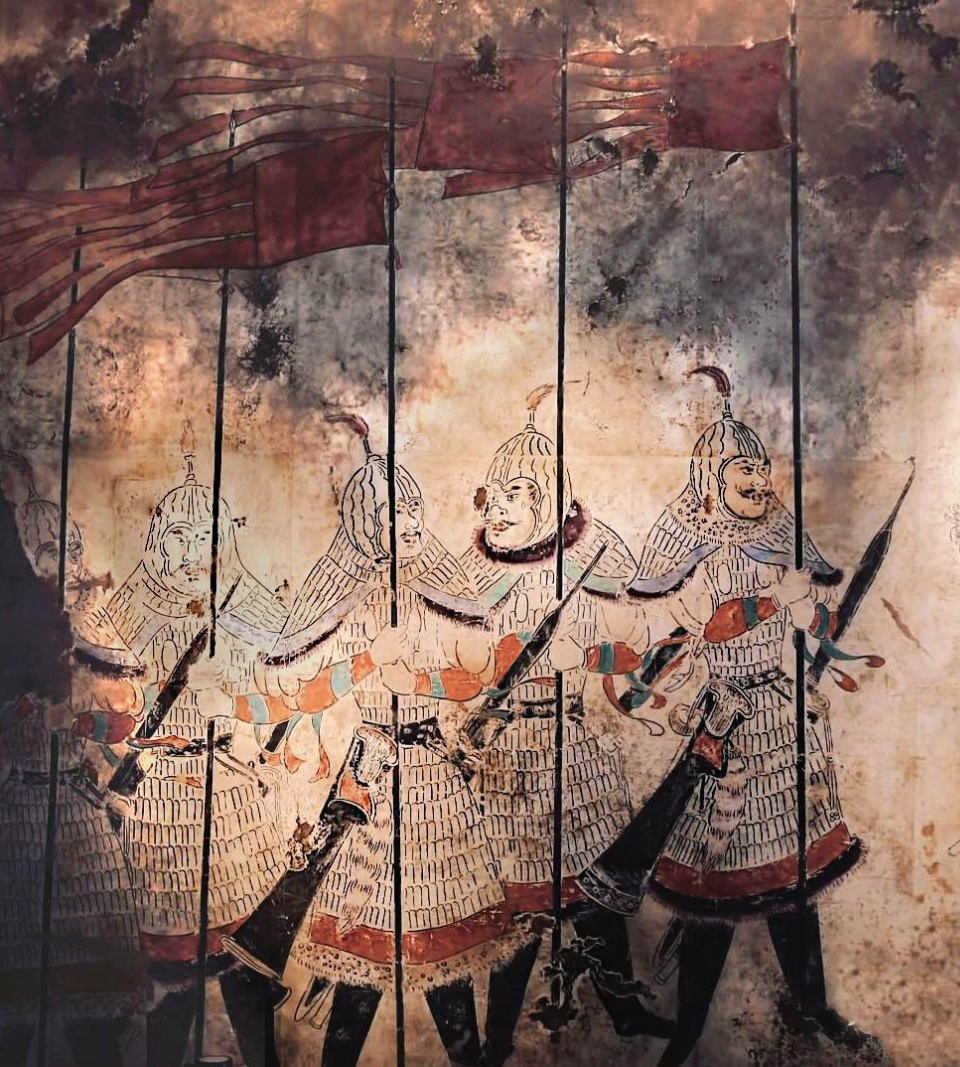
Tang soldiers of the Guards of Honor painted on Tomb of Princess Changle murals.

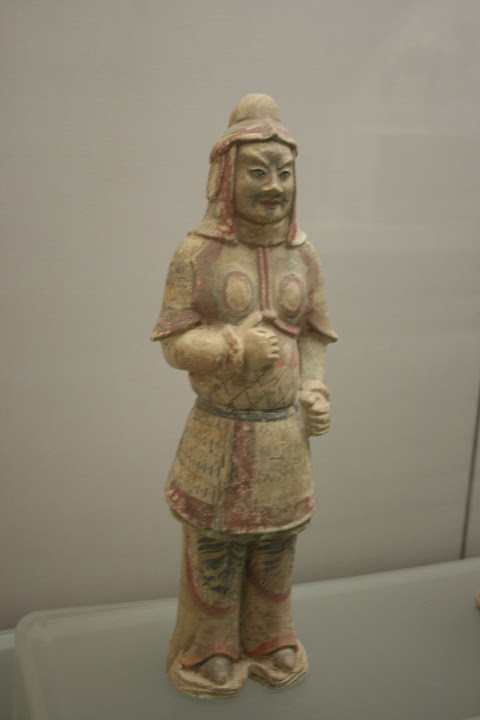
Tang soldier in cord and plaque armour

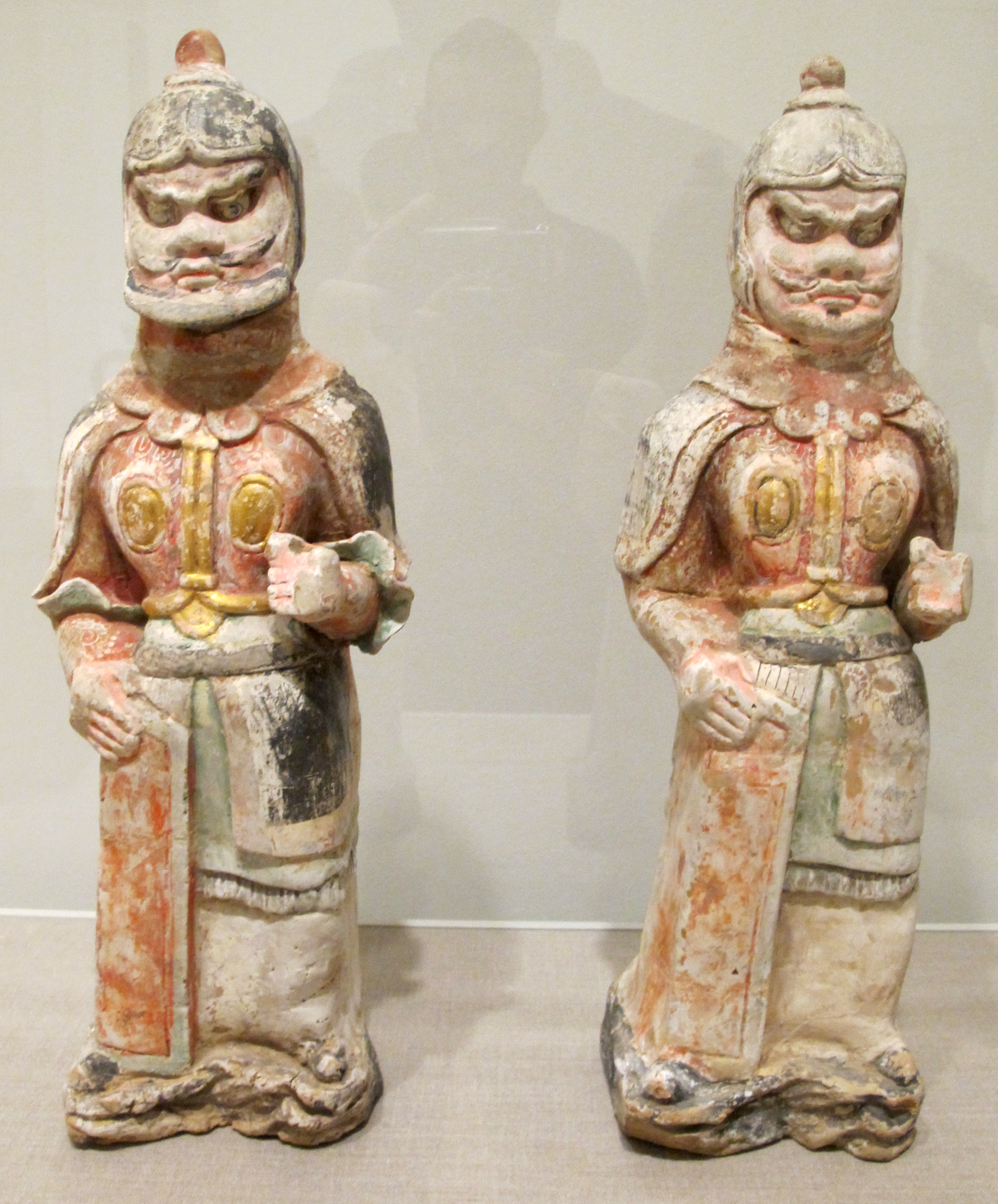
Tang shield warriors wearing cord and plaque

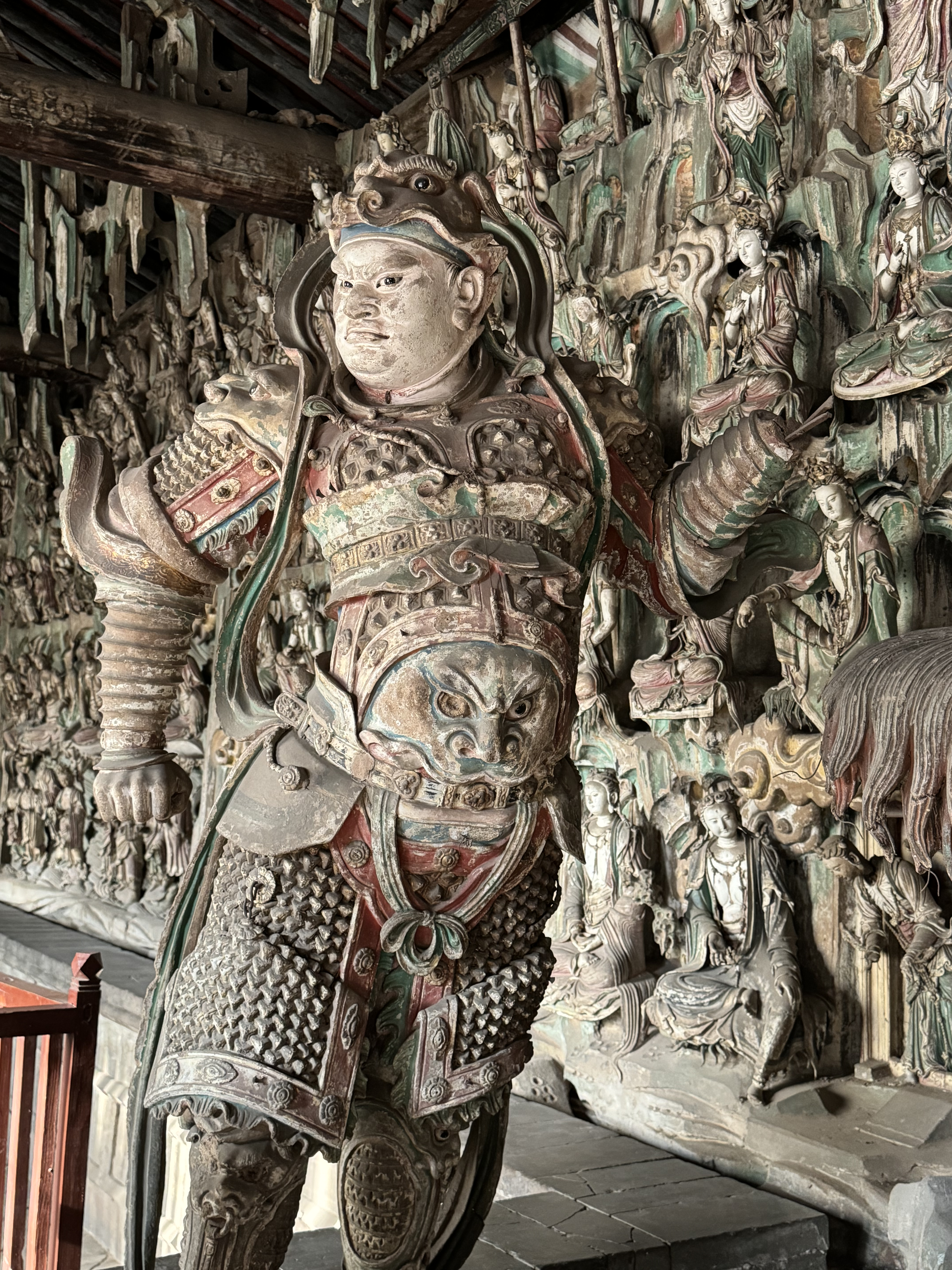
Statue of Weituo wearing mountain pattern armour, located in Pingyao, Ming dynasty period

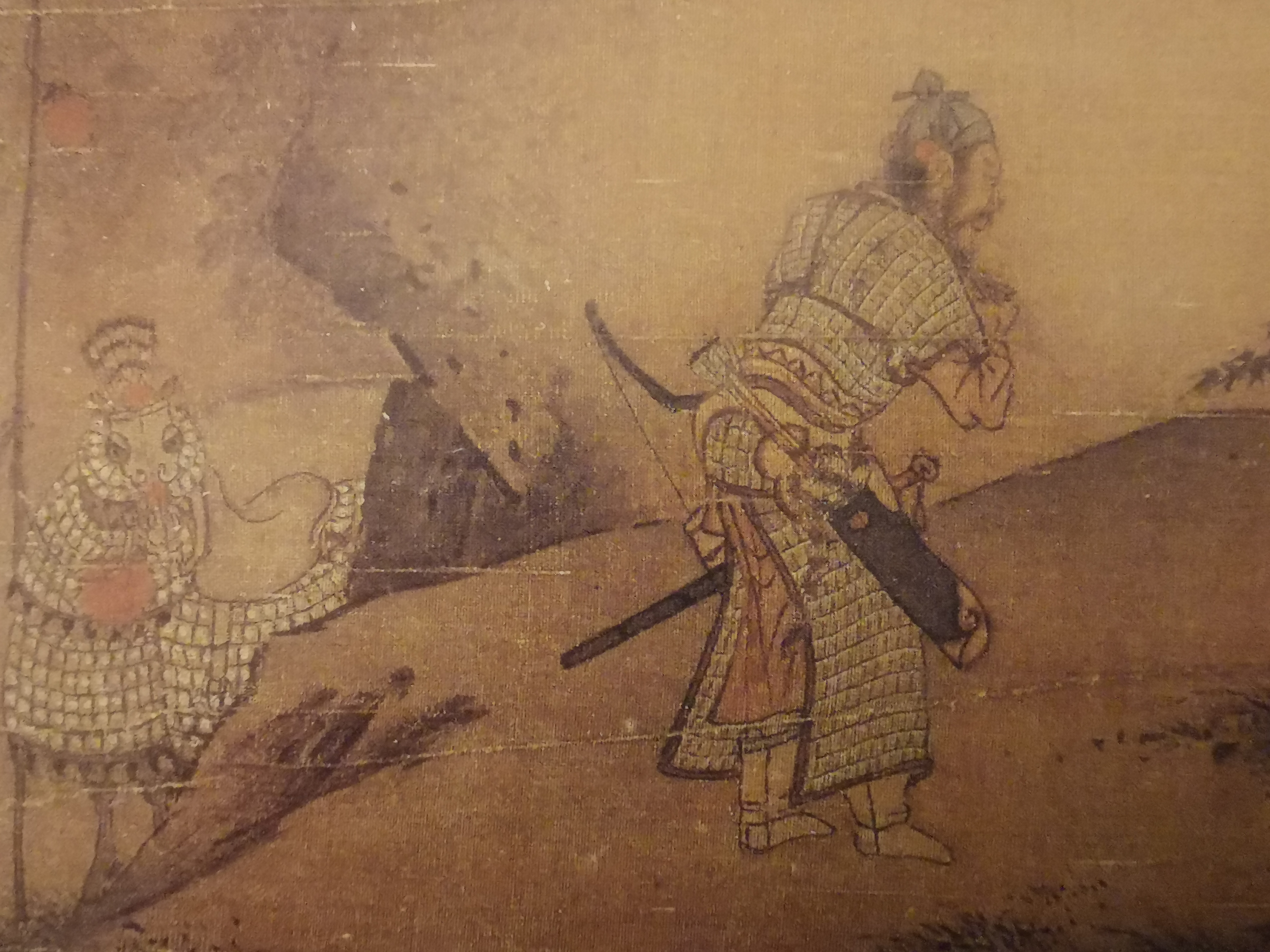
An armoured cavalryman asking for direction, from a painting by Yan Lide, the brother of Yan Liben, 7th c.

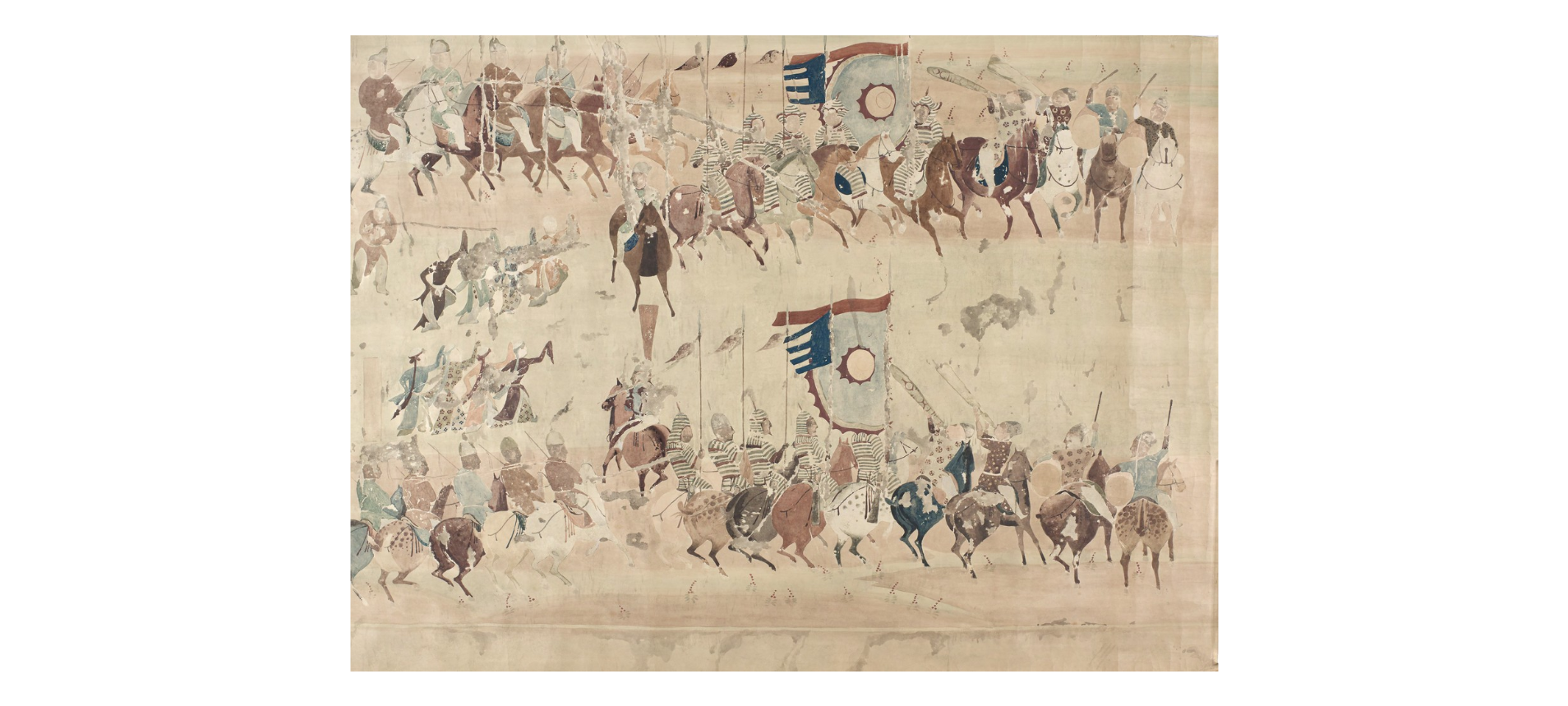
Cavalry of the Guiyi Circuit

By the Tang dynasty it was possible for armour to provide immense personal protection. Heavy cavalry played an important role in the Tang army during the wars following the Sui dynasty's collapse. In one instance Li Shimin's cousin, Li Daoxuan, was able to cut his way through the entire enemy mass of Xia soldiers and then cut his way back again, repeating the operation several times before the battle was won, at which point he had so many arrows sticking out of his armour that he looked like a "porcupine." In another battle between Li Shimin and Wang Shichong, Li and his entourage of 500 armoured cavalry were attacked by a light cavalry force led by Shan Xiongxin. Shan charged at Li directly but was intercepted by one of Li's generals, Yuchi Gong, who knocked Shan off his horse. Yuchi then led the armoured cavalry force and broke through the enemy army while Li rallied his forces and drove through Shan's light cavalry several times. The arrows and spears of Wang's forces had little effect on Tang heavy cavalry. The effective range of a composite bow against armoured troops in this era was considered to be around 75 to 100 yards.

Li Shimin's elite cavalry forces were known to have worn distinctive black "iron clad" armour, and Li Shimin himself was said to have been able to forgo food for two days and keep armour on for three days, but heavy cavalry declined as Turkic influence became more prevalent and light cavalry became the dominant mode of mounted warfare. Tang expeditionary forces to Central Asia preferred a mixture of light and heavy Chinese horse archers. After the An Lushan rebellion of the mid-9th century and losing the northwestern pastures to the Tibetans, Chinese cavalry almost disappeared altogether as a relevant military force. Many southern horses were considered too small or frail to carry an armoured soldier.

Infantry armour became more common in the Tang era and roughly 60 percent of active soldiers were equipped with armour of some kind. Armour could be manufactured locally or captured as loot. For instance 10,000 suits of iron armour were captured during the Goguryeo–Tang War. Armour and mounts, including pack animals, were supplied by the state through state funds, and thus considered state property. Private ownership of military equipment such as horse armour, long lances, and crossbows was prohibited. Possession was taken as intent of rebellion or treason. The army staff kept track of armour and weapons with detailed records of items issued. If a deficiency was discovered, the corresponding soldier was ordered to pay restitution. The state also provided clothing and rations for border garrisons and expeditionary armies. Soldiers not on active duty were expected to pay for themselves, although "professional" soldiers were given tax exemptions.

Tang iron lamellae were between 9.6 and 9 cm long, 2.6 to 1.3 cm wide, and 0.28 to 0.22 cm thick.

According to an account of a battle between Xue Rengui and Ilterish Qaghan's forces, Xue took off his armor to show his face to the enemy.

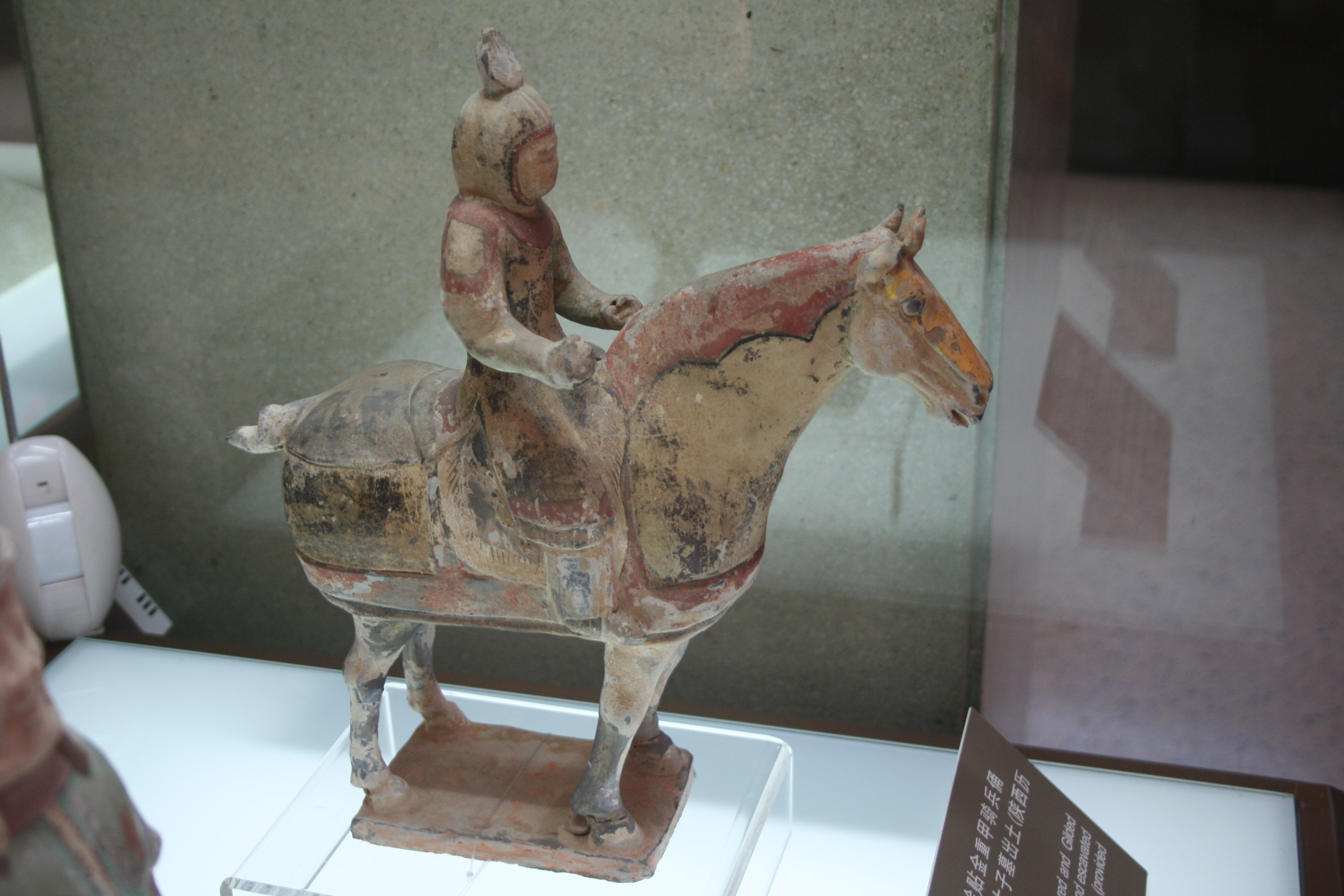
Tang cavalry figurine

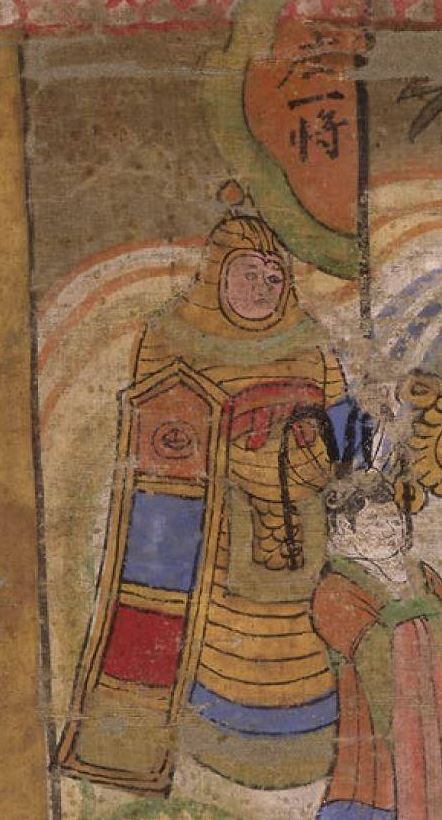
Tang soldier in a mural

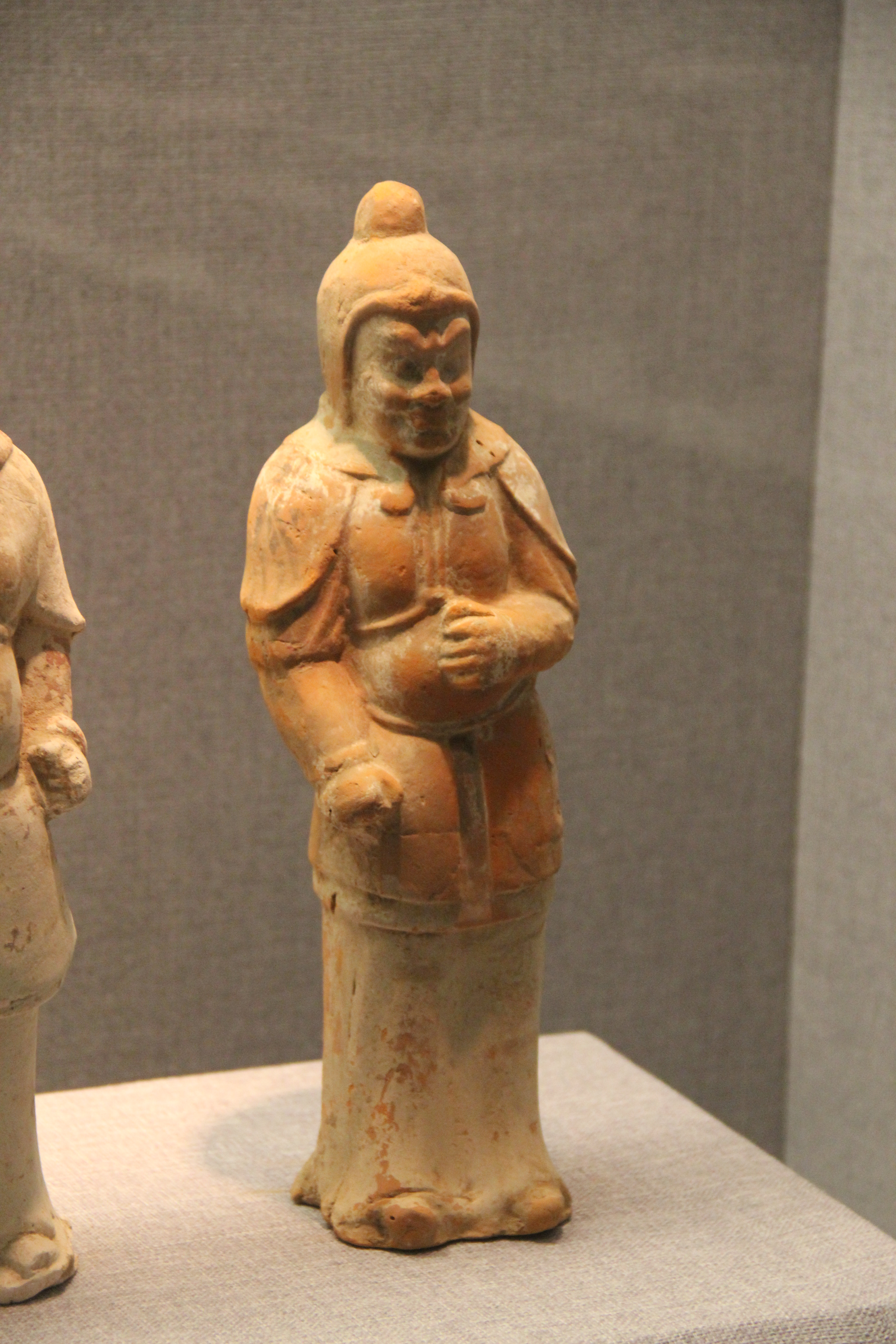
Tang soldier

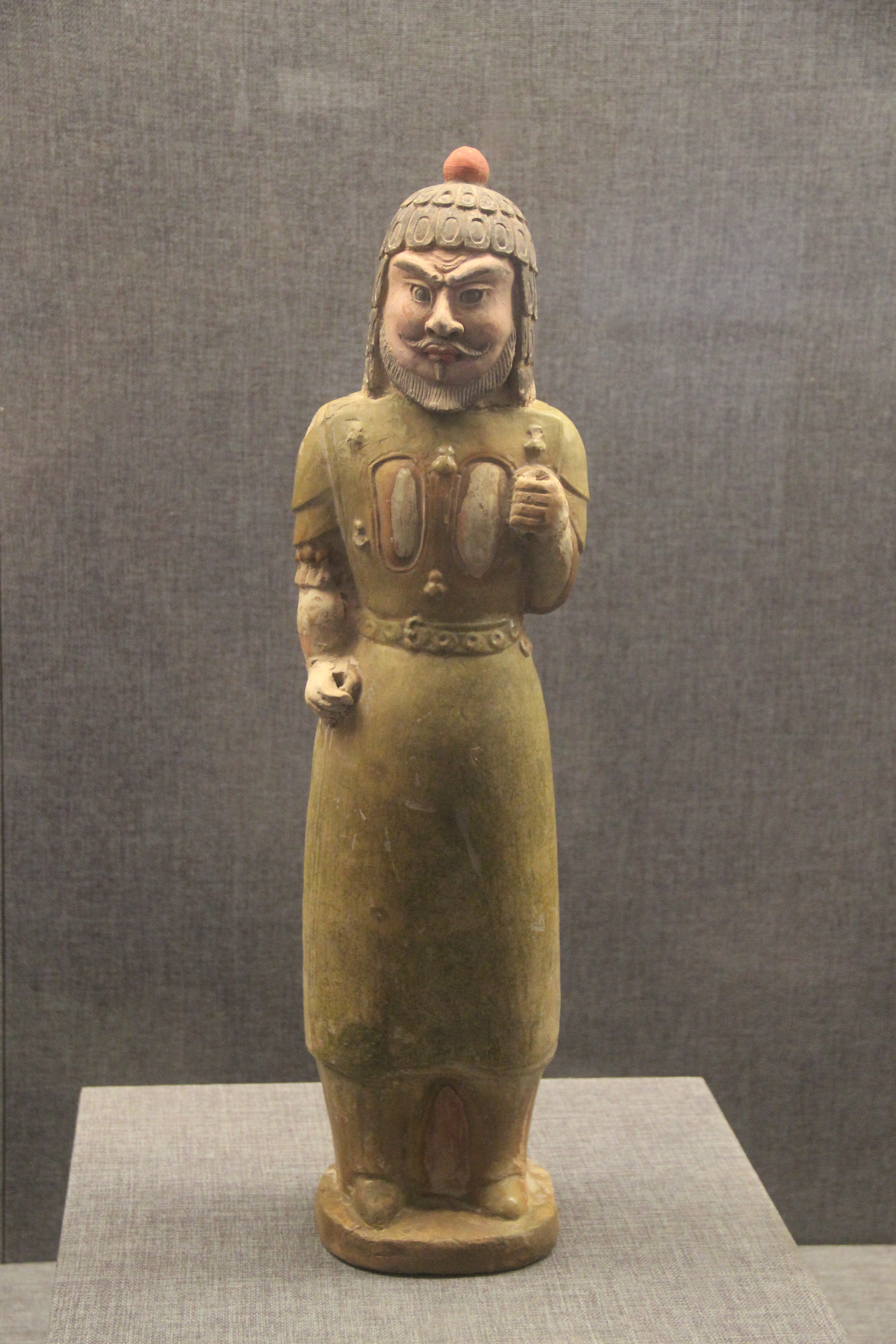
Tang soldier

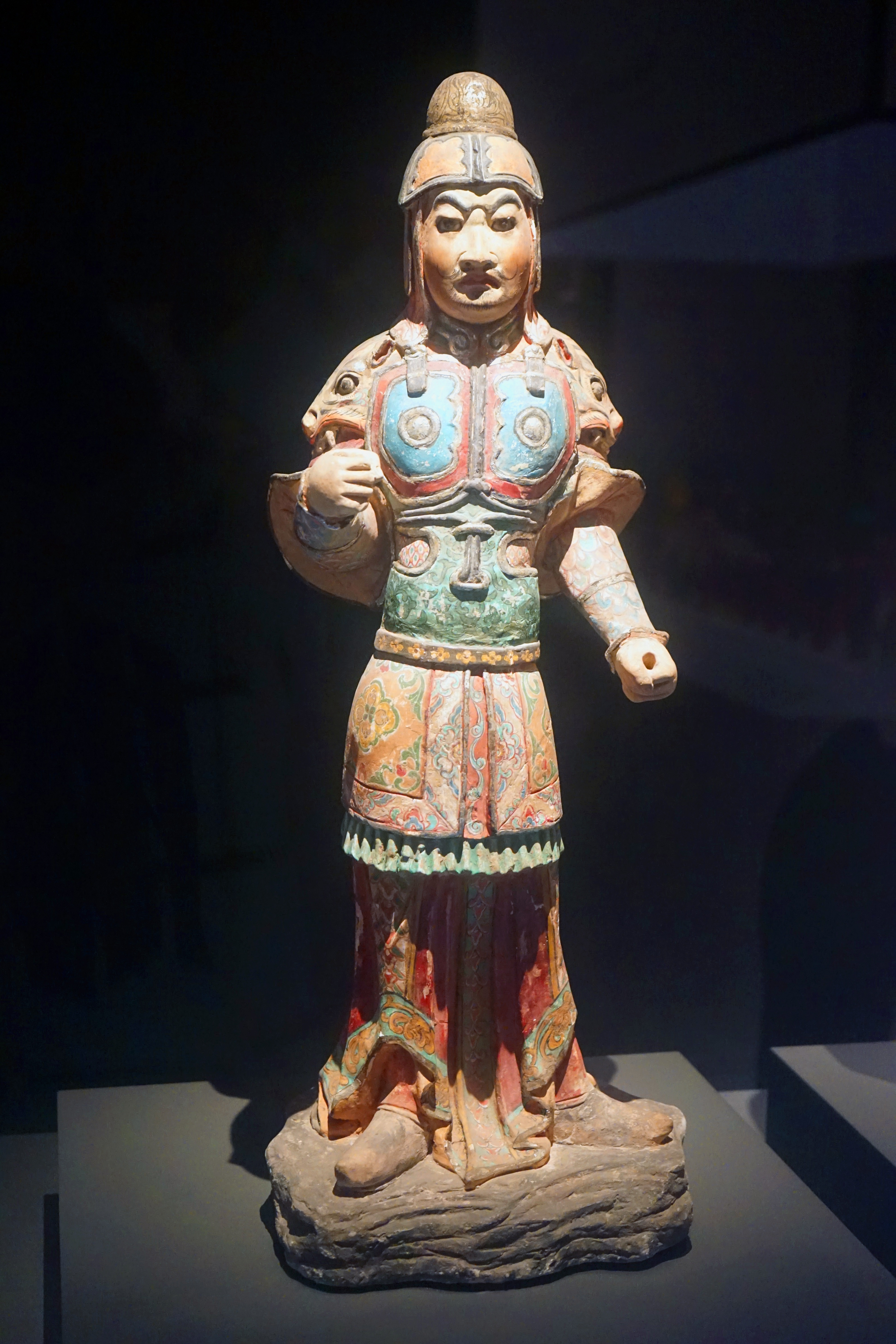
7th century painted figure of a Tang military officer

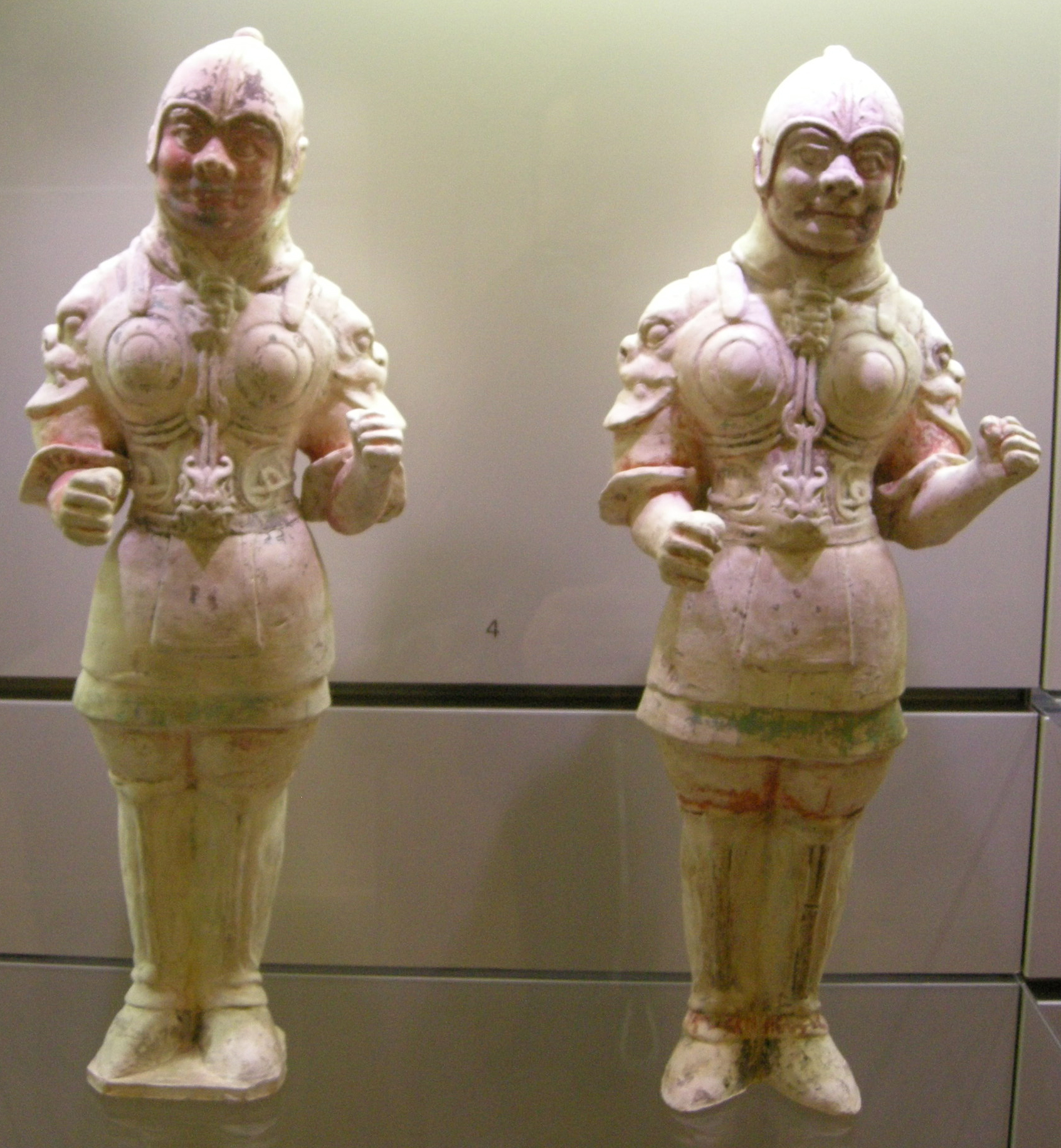
Tang figurines with cord and plaque armour

==== Mail armour ====
Mail was already known to the Chinese by the Tang dynasty. The earliest known reference to "chained ring armor" can be found in an early 3rd century record by Cao Zhi and was encountered in 384 AD when their allies in the nation of Kuchi arrived wearing "armor similar to chains". However mail armour was not mentioned again until 718 AD when a tributary mission from Samarkand presented to the Tang emperor a coat of "link armour". Mail was later improved on during the Song dynasty to withstand arrows better, by which H. Russell Robinson believes meant using interlocked rings. However mail was never used in any significant numbers and was seen as foreign and exotic, originating from the Qiang people from the west. The dominant form of armour continued to be lamellar.

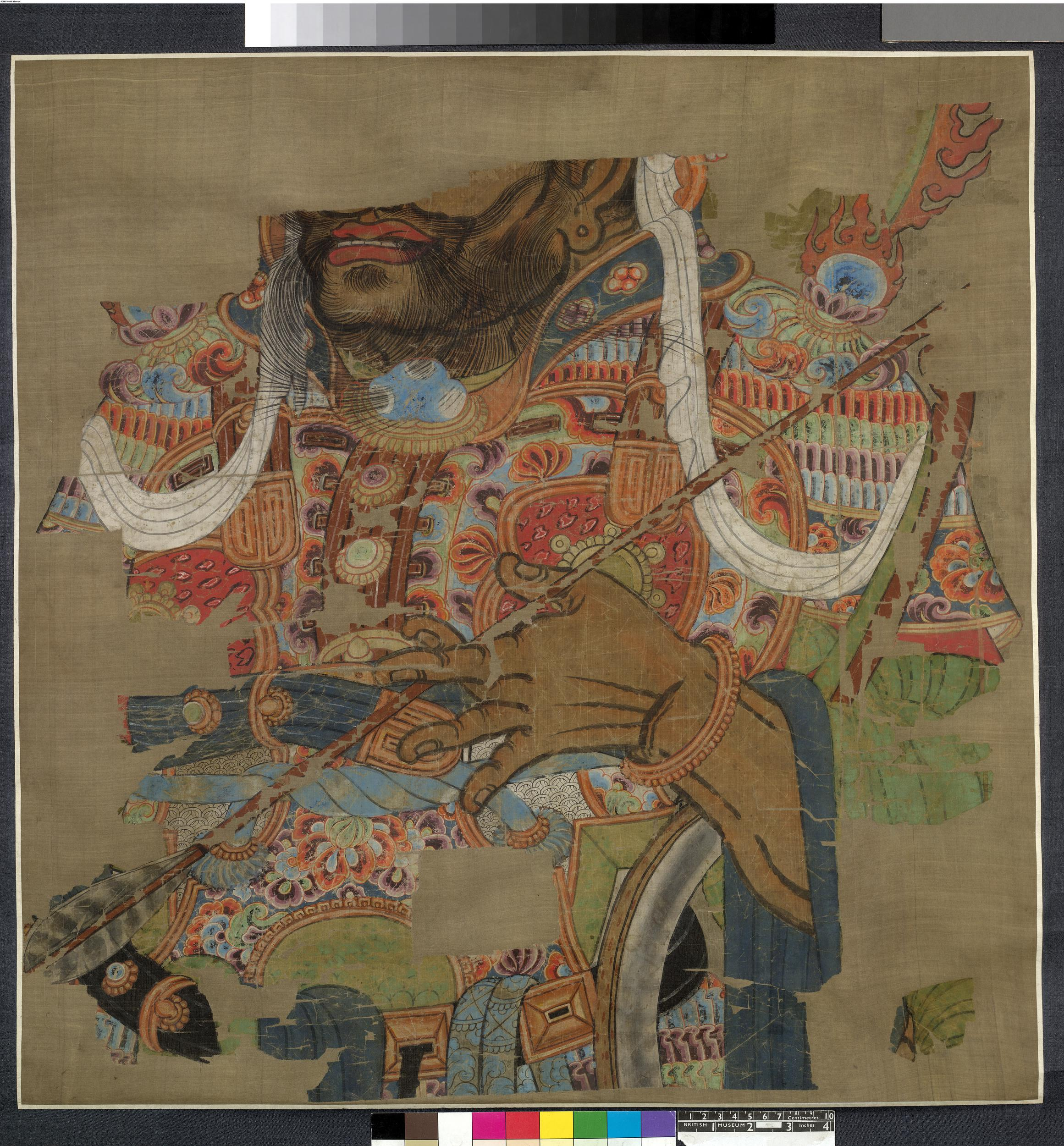
Tang depiction of a man wearing cord and plaque armour, lamellar shoulder guards, and mail armour

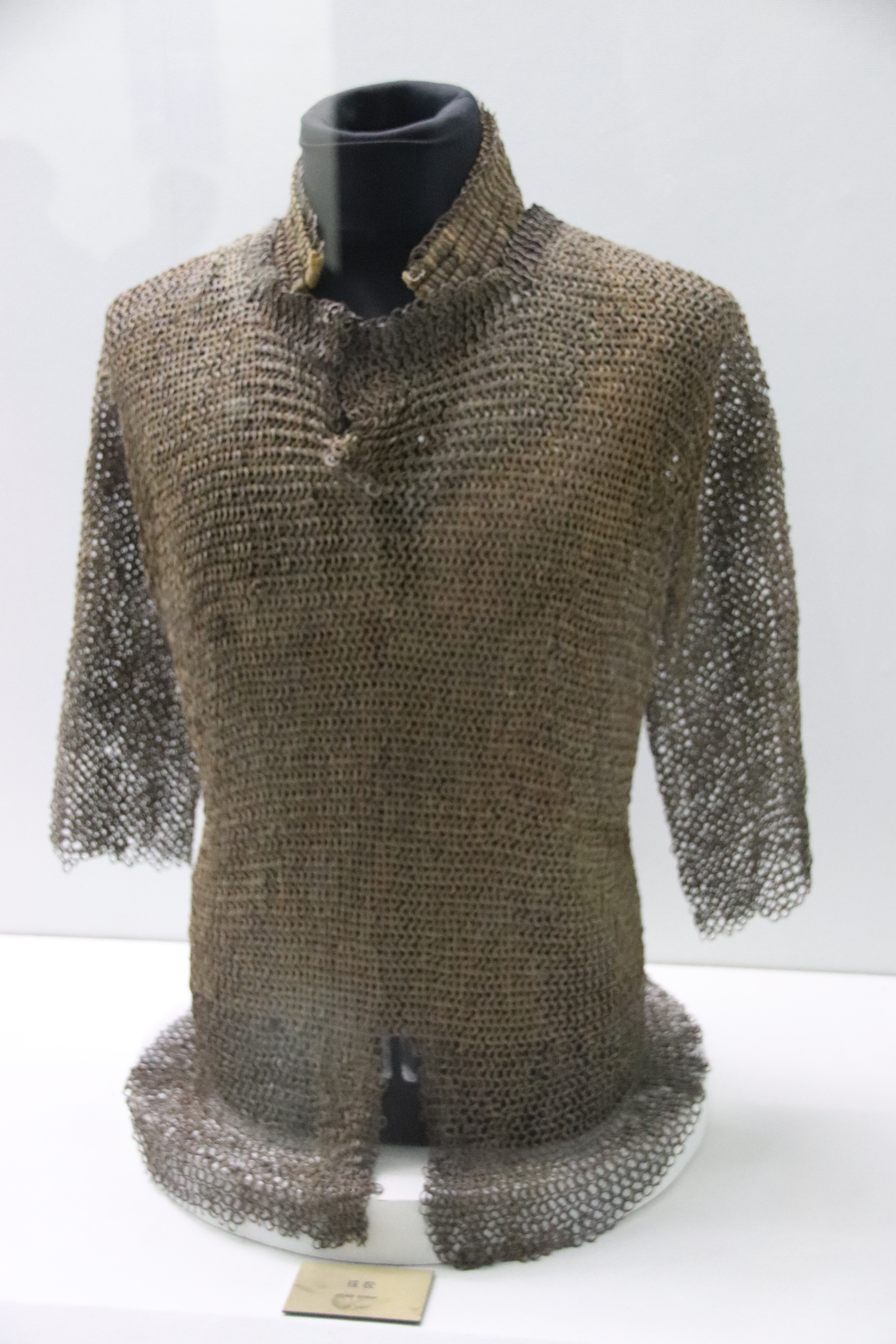
Western Xia mail armour

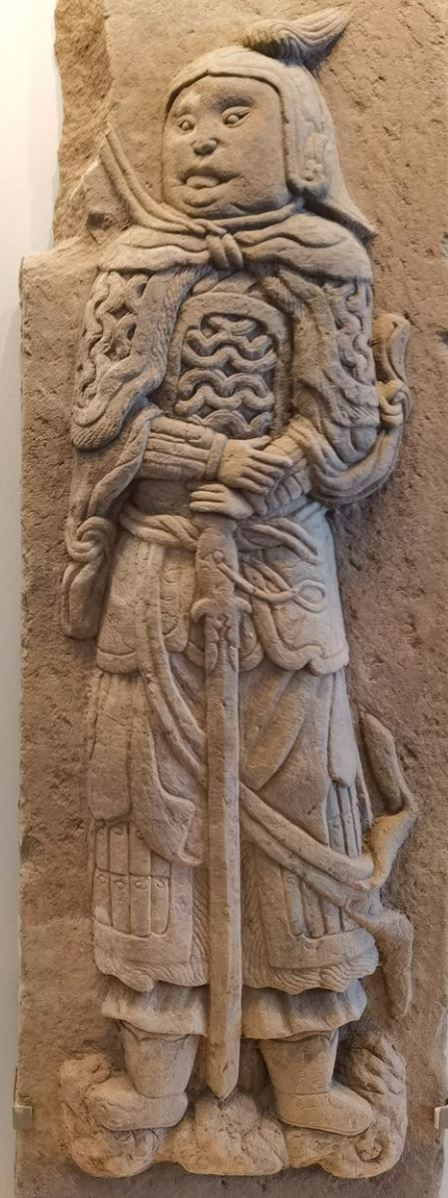
Mail armoured swordsman with lamellar skirt, Song dynasty

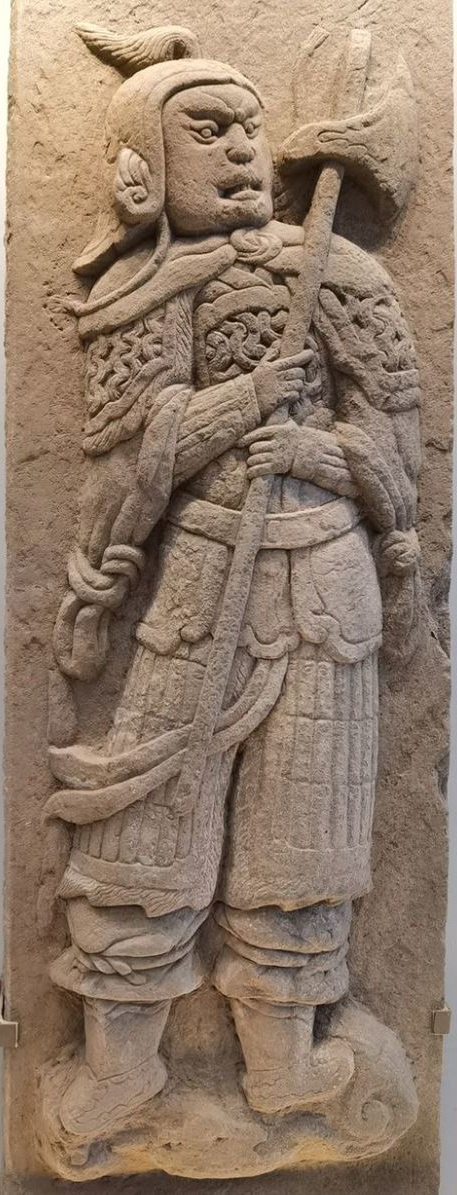
Song axeman in mail and lamellar armour

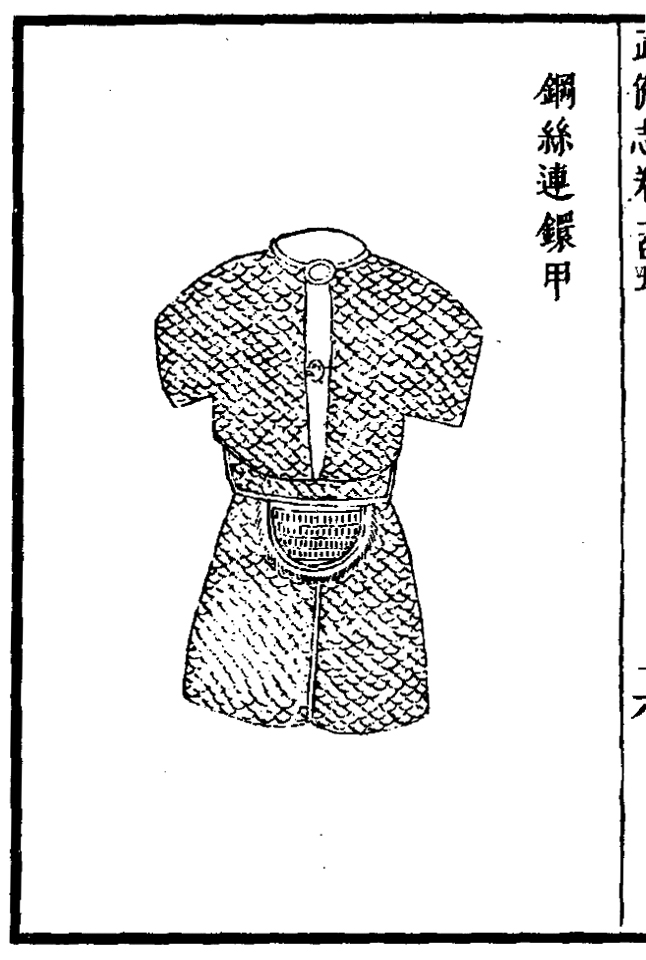
Ming depiction of mail armour - it looks like scale, but this was a common artistic convention. The text says "steel wire connecting ring armour."

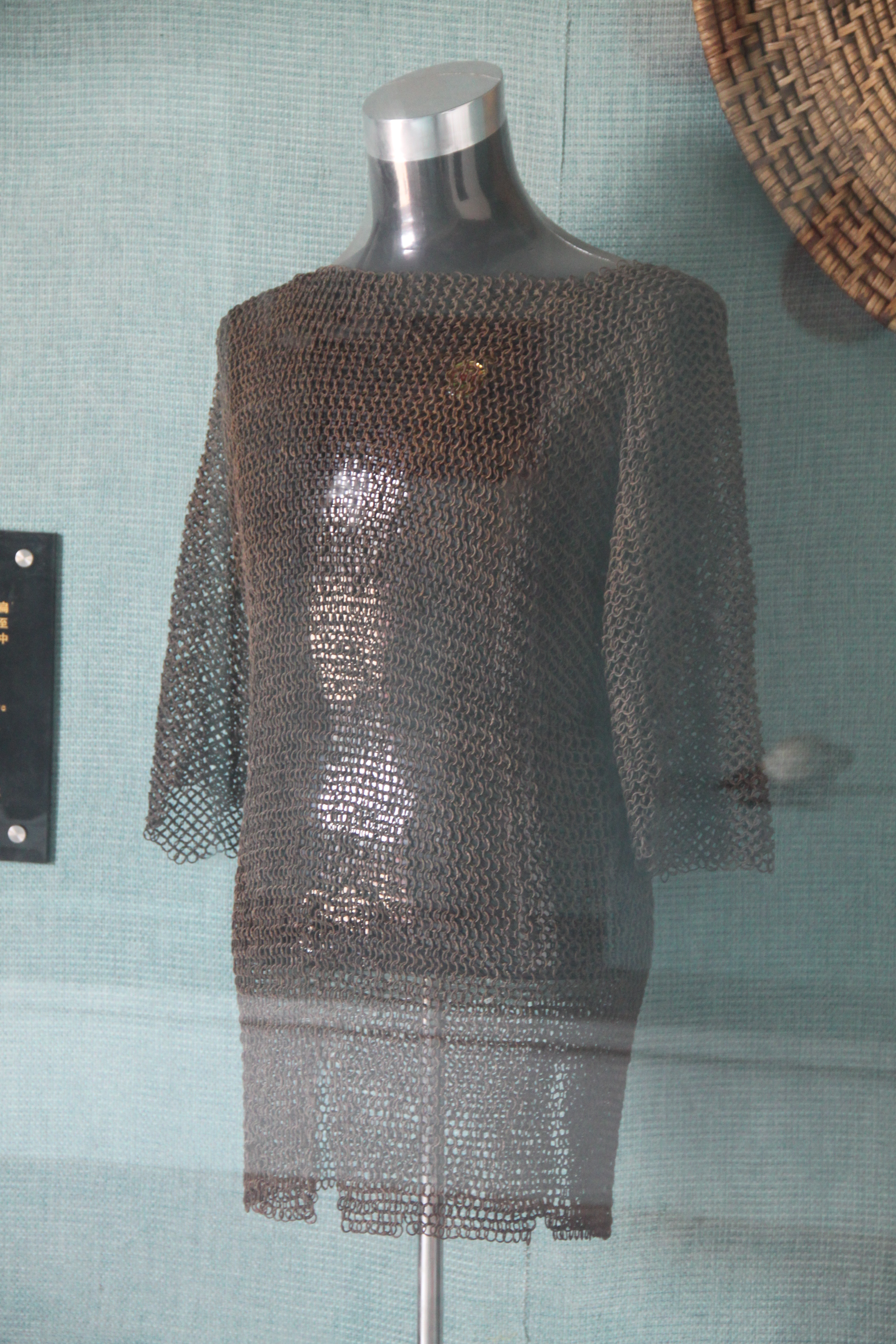
Mail shirt, Qing dynasty

==== Mountain pattern armour ====
References to mountain pattern armour (Chinese: 山文鎧; pinyin: shānwénkǎi) appear as early as the Tang dynasty in the Six Statutels of the Tang Dynasty, but historical texts provide no explanation or diagram of how it actually worked. There are also no surviving examples of it. Everything that is known about mountain pattern armour comes from paintings and statues, typically of the Song and Ming periods. It is not unique to China and has been found in depictions in Korea, Vietnam, Japan, and even Thailand, however non-religious depictions are limited to only China, Korea, and Vietnam. Reconstruction projects of this type of armour have largely failed to produce good results. The current theory is that this type of armour is made from a multitude of small pieces of iron or steel shaped like the Chinese character for the word "mountain" (山). One theory is that they were zigzag lines of pointed scale heads similar to lamellar armour. The pieces are interlocked and riveted to a cloth or leather backing. It covers the torso, shoulders and thighs while remaining comfortable and flexible enough to allow movement. Also during this time, senior Chinese officers used mirror armour (Chinese: 護心鏡; pinyin: hùxīnjìng) to protect important body parts, while cloth, leather, lamellar, and/or Mountain pattern armor were used for other body parts. This overall design was called "shining armor" (Chinese: 明光甲; pinyin: míngguāngjiǎ).

There is an alternative theory that mountain pattern armour is simply a result of very stylistic depictions of mail armour, but known depictions of mail armour in Chinese art do not match with mountain pattern armour either. There are also depictions of mountain pattern armour being used in conjunction with mail armour at the same time.

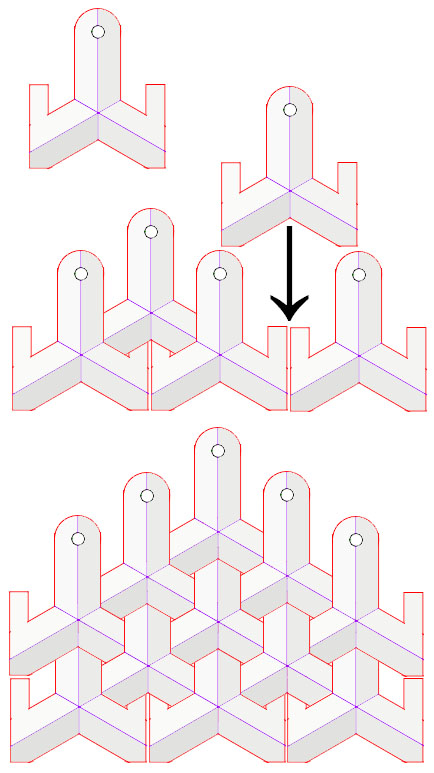
Scale armor with interlocking mountain-shaped pieces

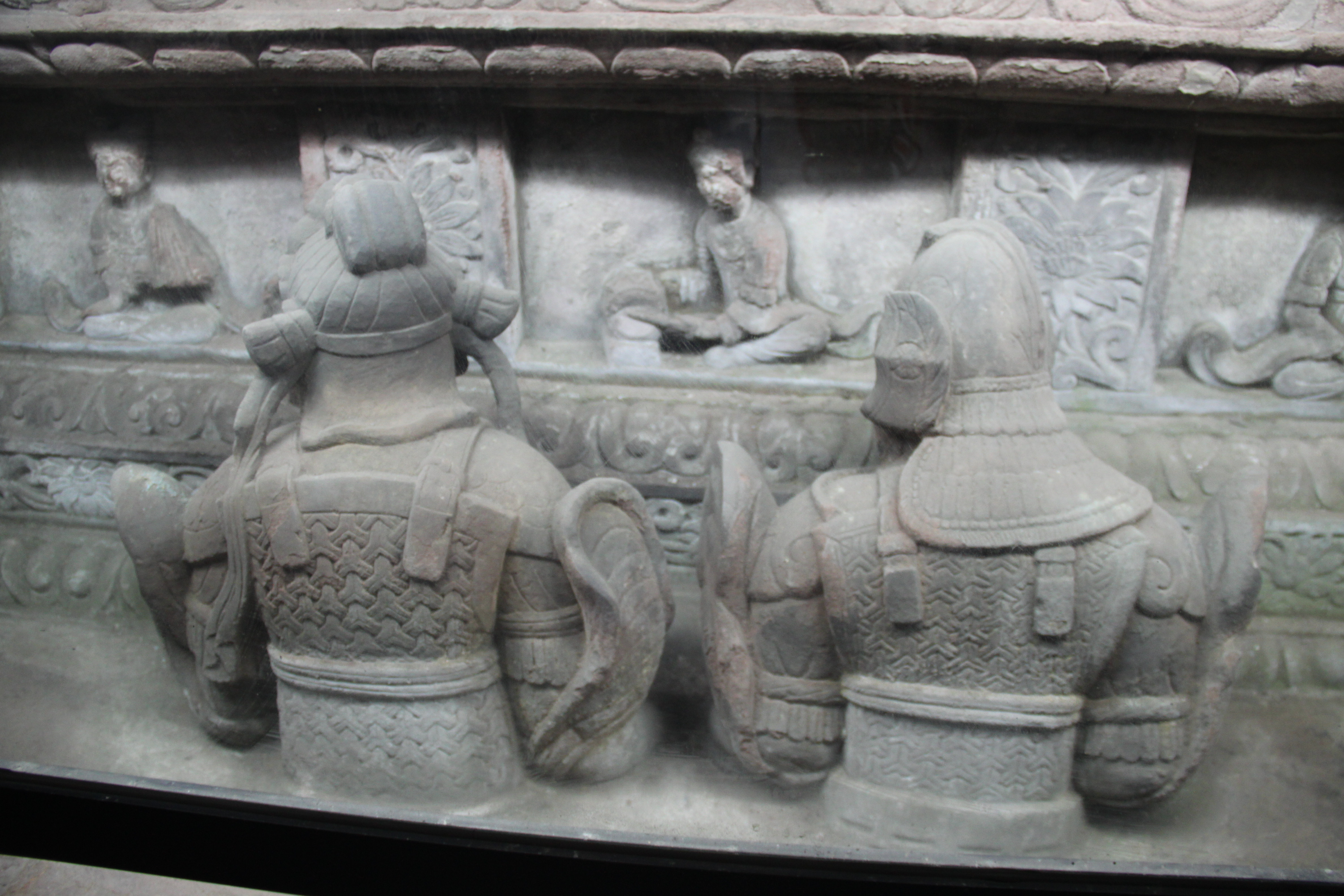
Tang tomb guardians wearing mountain pattern armour, from the tomb of Wang Jian (c. 900 AD)

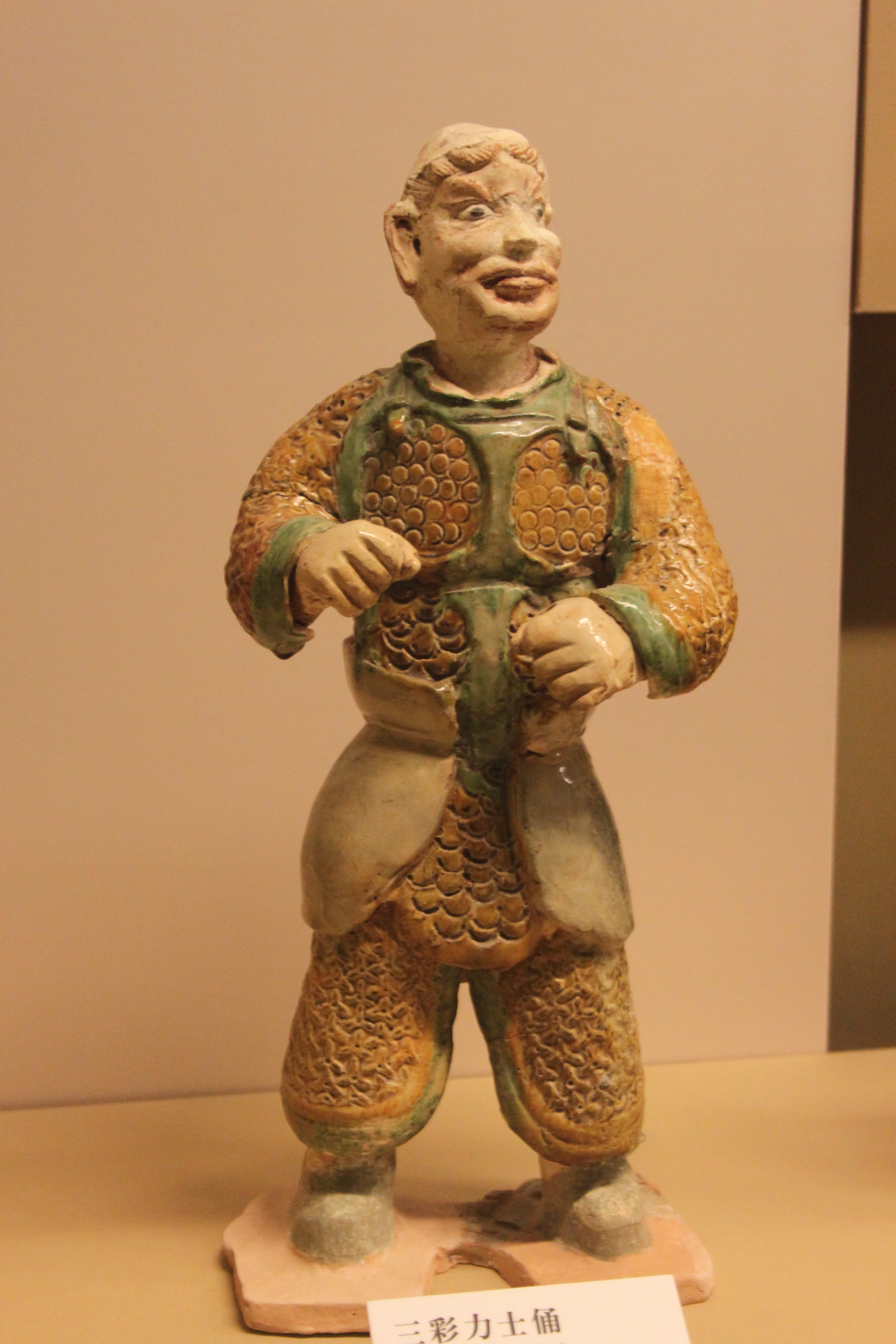
Tang soldier wearing a combination of mail, cord and plaque, and mountain pattern armour.

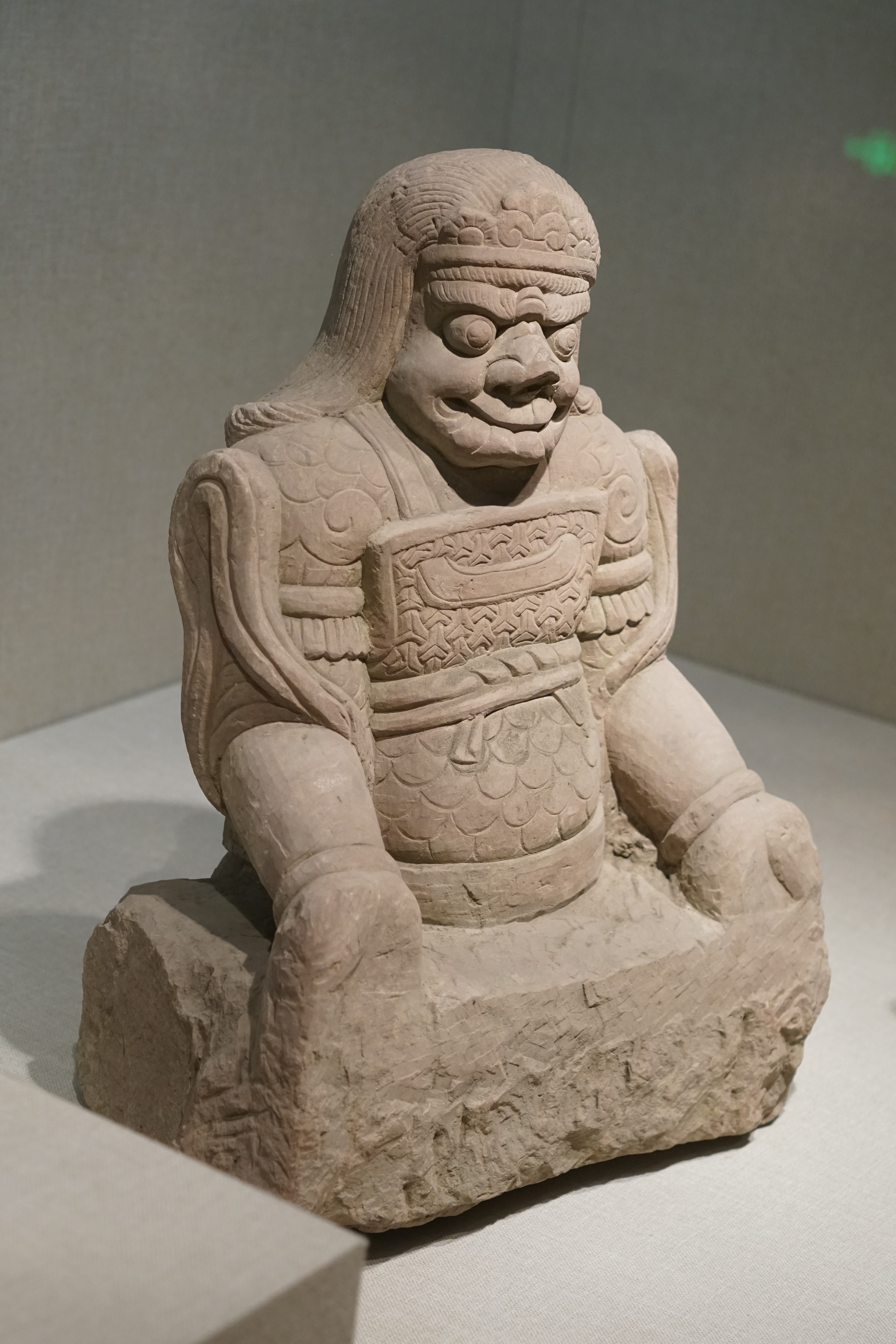
Five Dynasties and Ten Kingdoms period stone guardian wearing mountain pattern armour

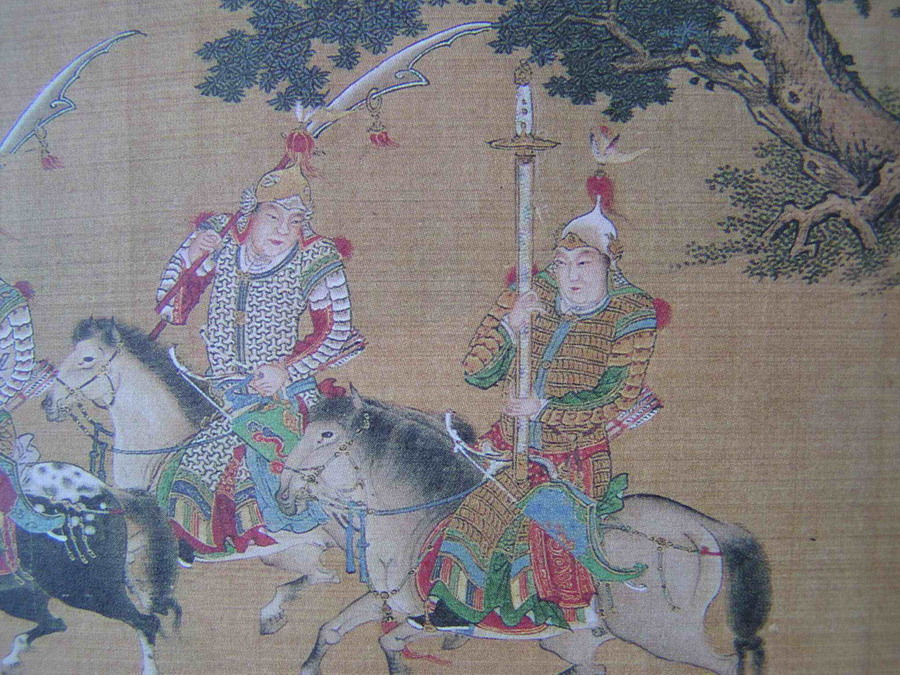
Close up view of the Ming dynasty painting "Departure Herald" showing riders wearing lamellar and mountain pattern armour

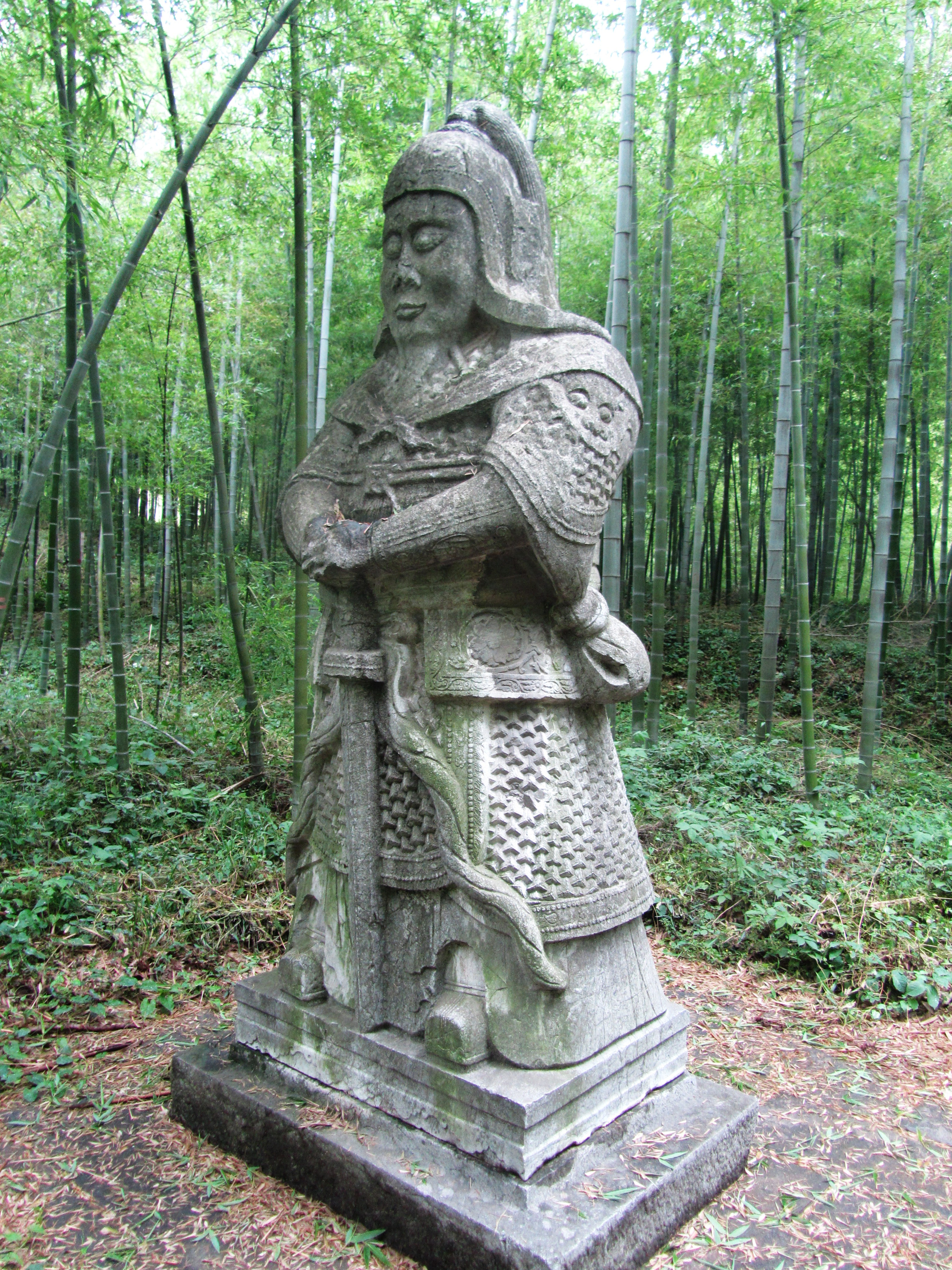
Tomb guardian in mountain pattern armour at the tomb of Chang Yuchun (1330–1369)

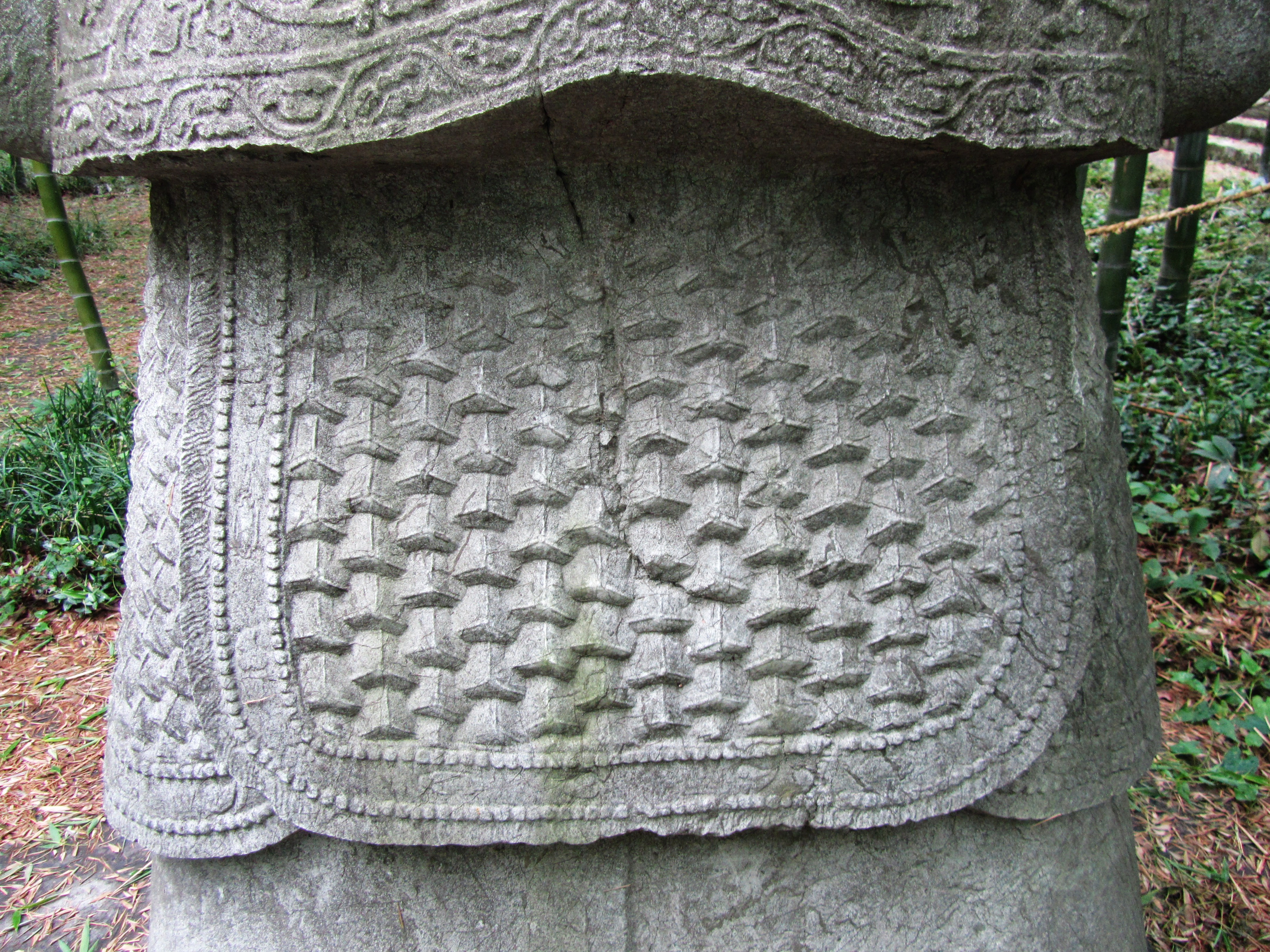
Close up of mountain pattern armour sculpture

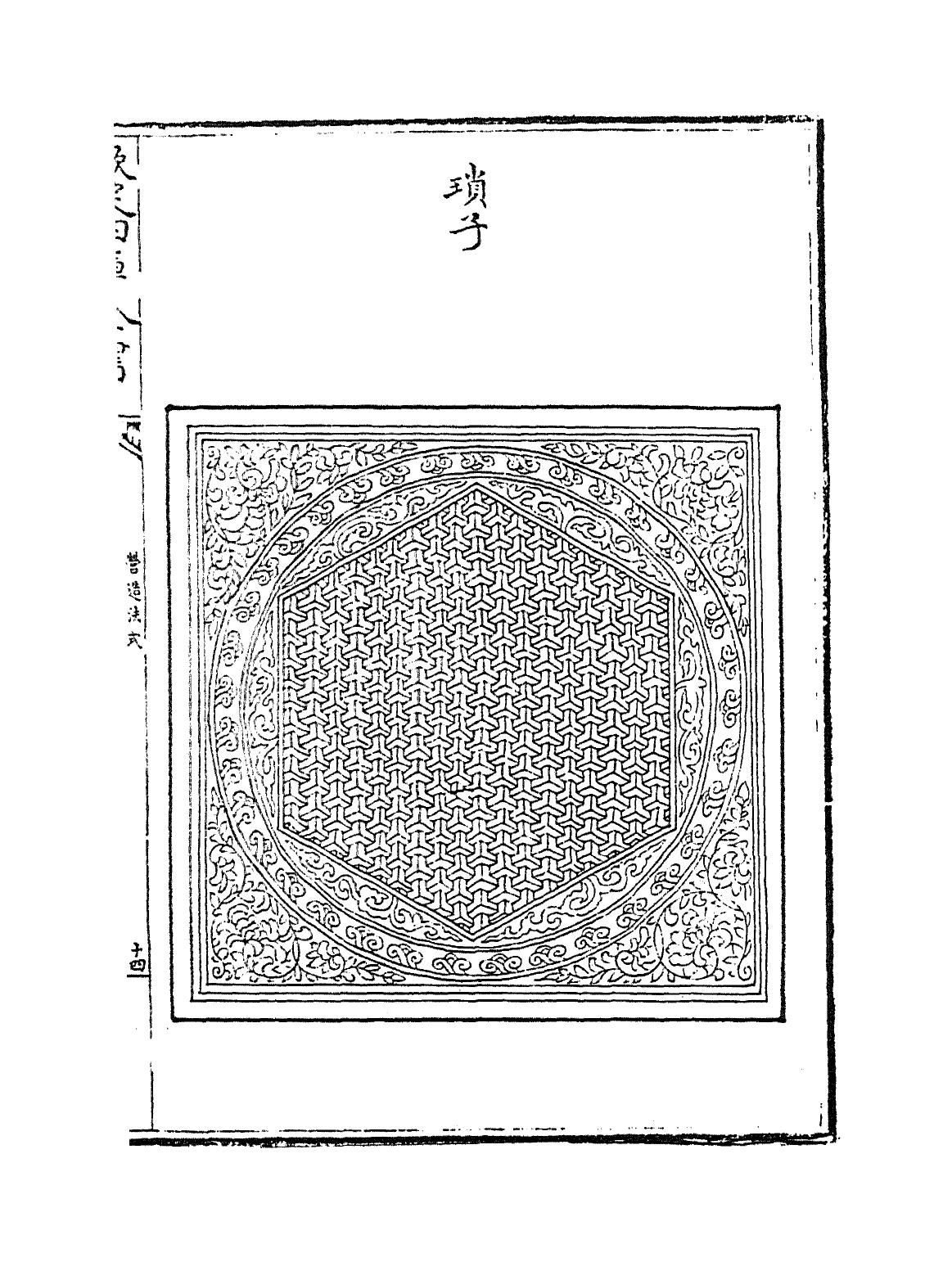
Mountain pattern motif from Yingzao Fashi, called "chainmail" (锁子)

=== Five Dynasties and Ten Kingdoms (907–960) ===
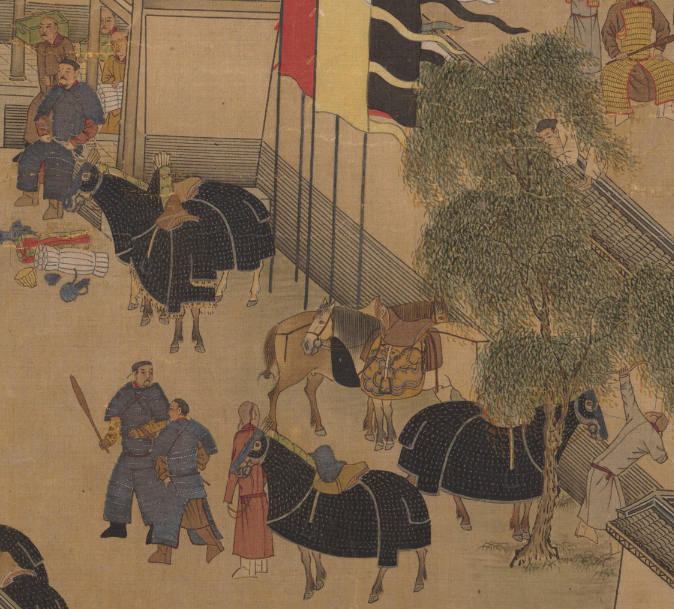
Song dynasty depiction of Xiongnu in Eighteen Songs of a Nomad Flute, but their appearance is based on contemporary Khitans

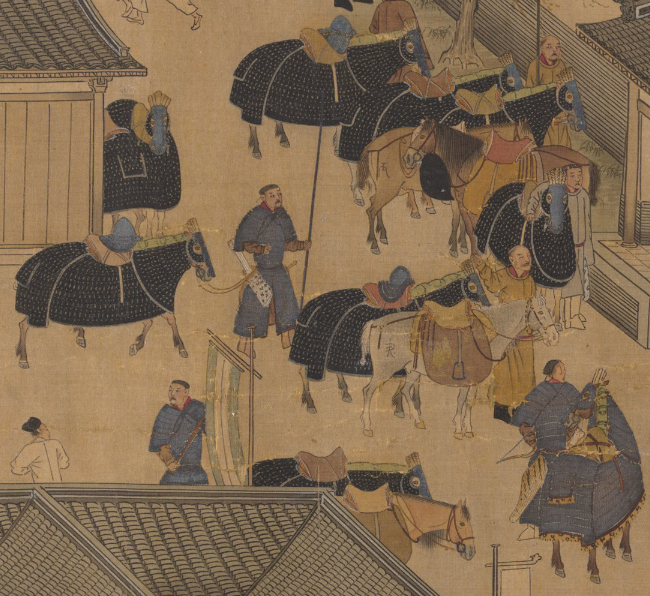
Khitan cavalry

==== Paper armour ====
During the wars between the Later Zhou and Southern Tang, civilians on the Tang side formed "White Armor Armies", named after the white paper armour they wore. These Tang civilian armies experienced some success in driving off small contingents of Zhou forces but avoided confrontation with the larger army. The White Armour militia army was later revived to fight against the Song dynasty, but they were ineffective and disbanded.

Later Ming texts provide descriptions of paper armour. One version was made of silk paper and functioned as a gambeson, worn under other armour or by itself. Silk paper could also be used for arm guards. Another version used thicker, more flexible paper, hammered soft, and fastened with studs. It's said that this type of paper armour performed better when soaked with water.

Paper armour was still worn by the Hui people in Yunnan in the late 19th century. Bark paper armour in layers of thirty to sixty sheets in addition to silk and cotton was considered to be fairly good protection against musket balls and bayonets, which got stuck in the layers of paper, but not breech loading rifles at close quarters.

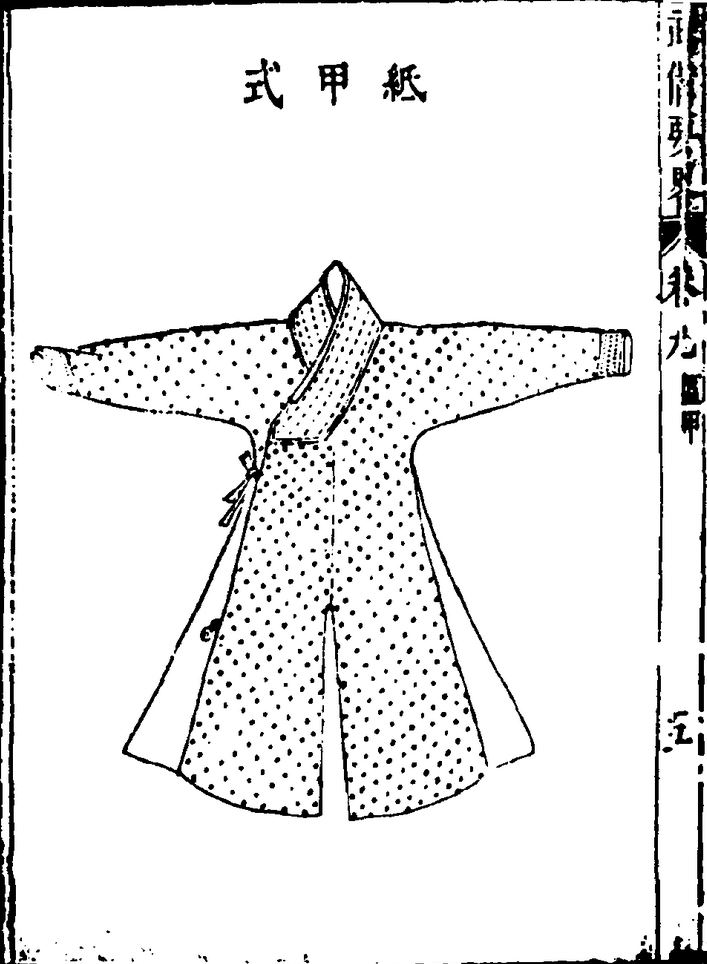
Sleeved paper armour

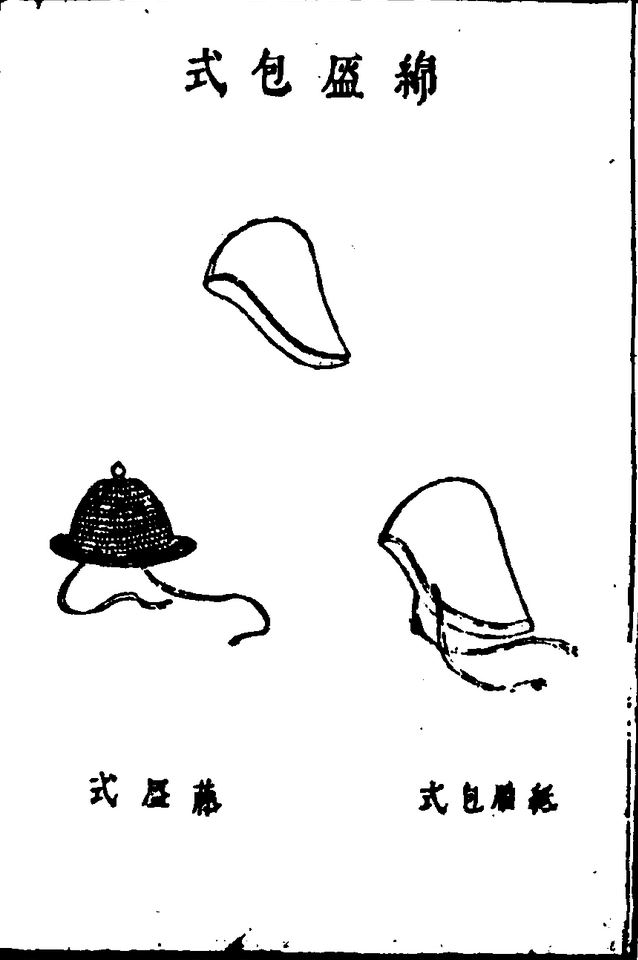
Cotton, paper, and rattan helmets

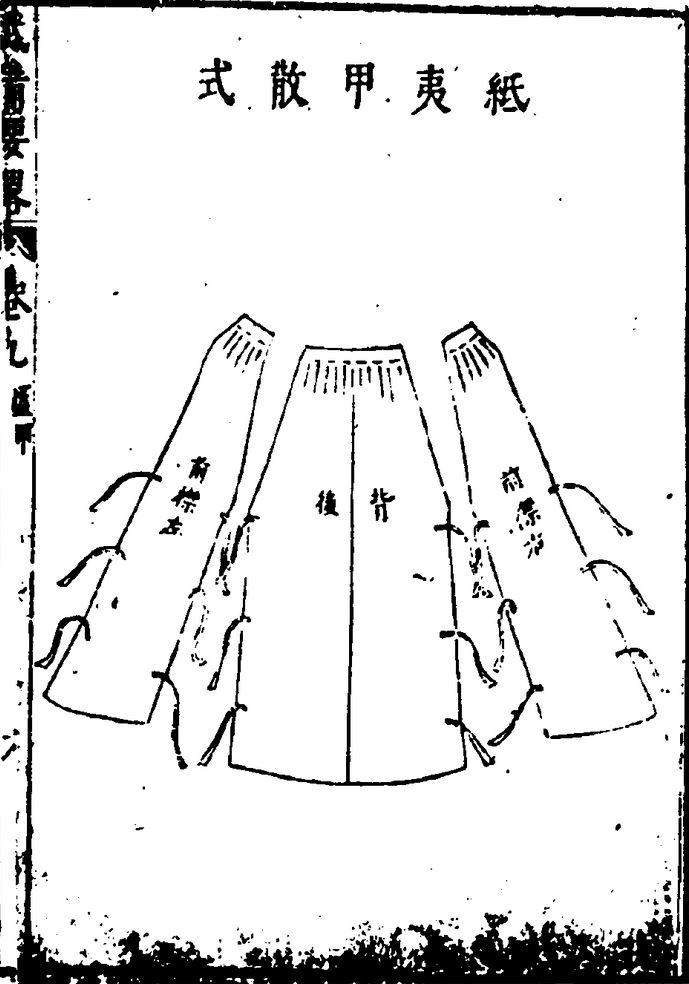
Barbarian paper armour

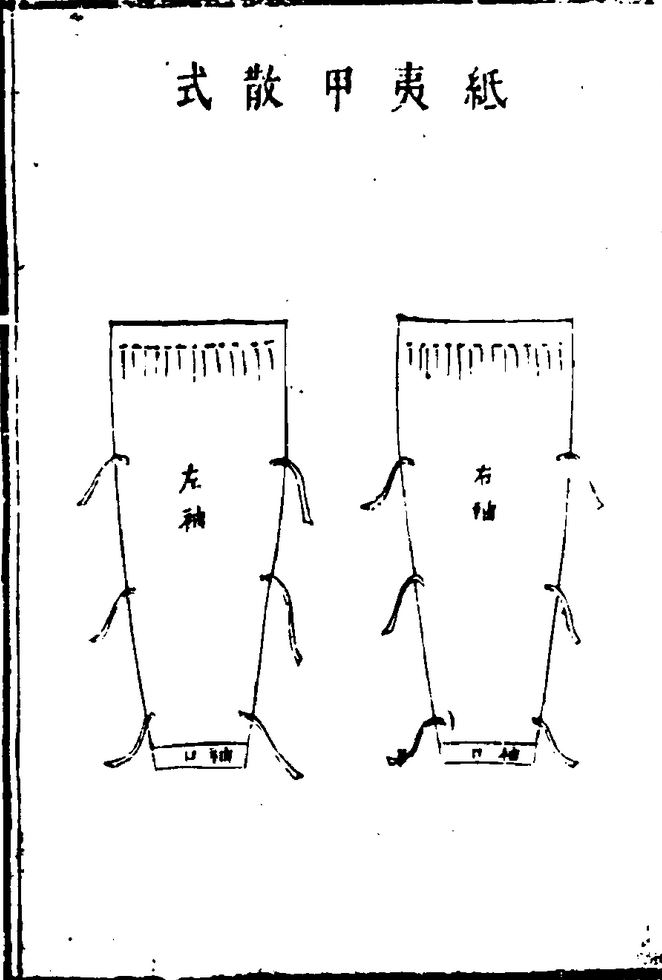
Barbarian paper armour

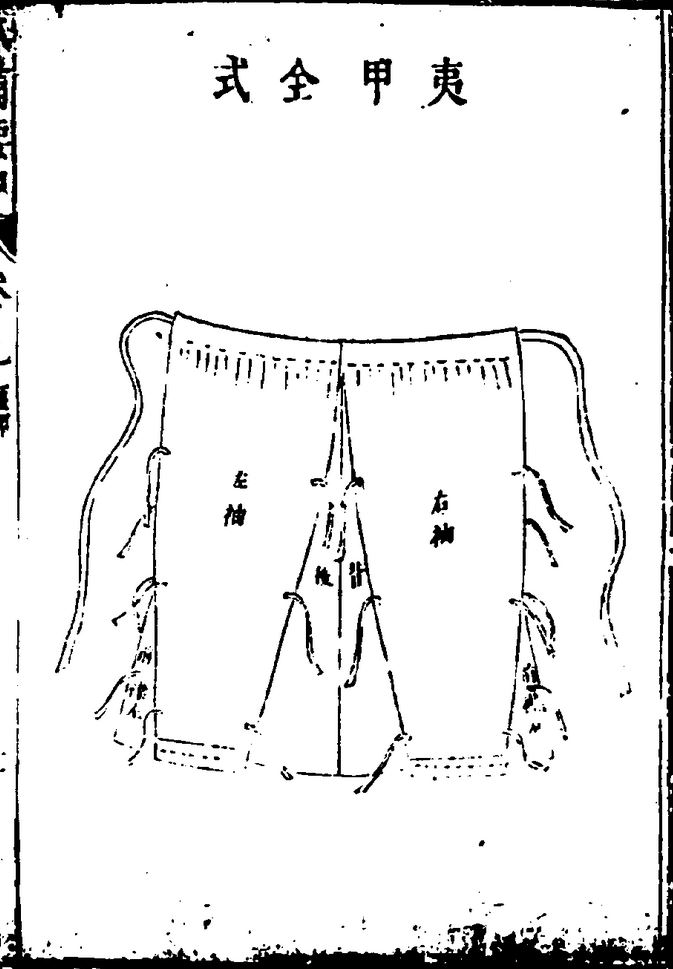
Barbarian paper armour

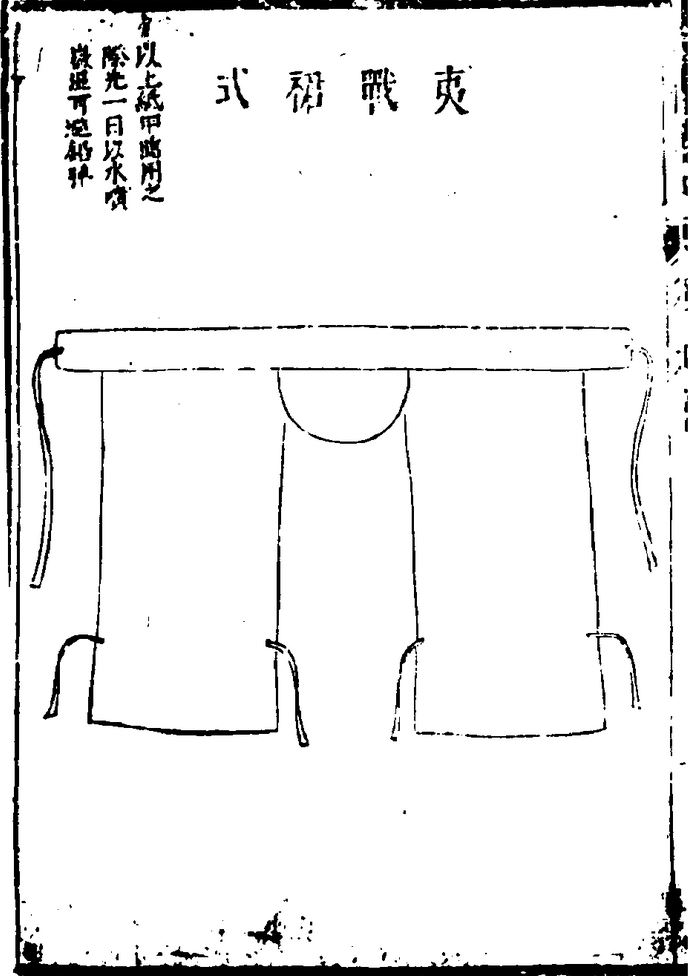
Barbarian paper armour

=== Liao dynasty (907–1125) ===
The Khitans of the Liao dynasty employed heavy armoured cavalry as the core of their army. In battle they arrayed light cavalry in the front and two layers of armoured cavalry in the back. Even foragers were armoured. Units of Khitan heavy cavalry were organized in groups of 500 to 700 men. Unlike some other empires originating from nomadic tribes, the Khitans preferred to fight in dense heavy cavalry formations rather than the wide formations of horse archers.

=== Song dynasty (960–1279) ===
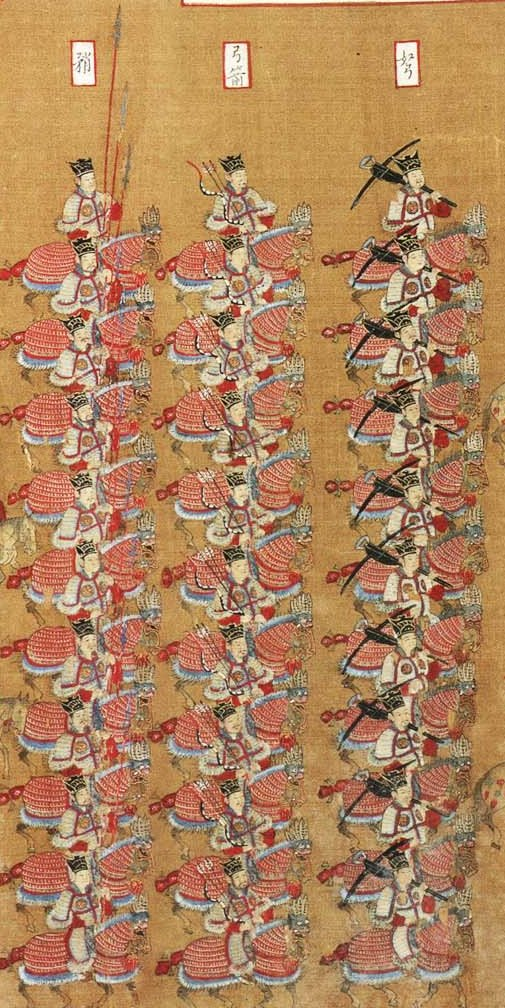
Armoured Song cavalry

During the Song dynasty (960–1279) it became fashionable to create warts on pieces of armour to imitate cold forged steel, a product typically produced by non-Han people in modern Qinghai. Warts created from cold work were actually spots of higher carbon in the original steel, thus aesthetic warts on non-cold forged steel served no purpose. According to Shen Kuo, armour constructed of cold forged steel was impenetrable to arrows shot at a distance of 50 paces. Even if the arrow happened to hit a drill hole, the arrowhead was the one which was ruined. However crossbows were still prized for their ability to penetrate heavy armour.

The History of Song notes that Song "tools of war were exceedingly effective, never before seen in recent times," and "their weapons and armor were very good", but "their troops weren't always effective." According to Sima Guang, since most military problems came from the north, the military establishment in the south was neglected, leaving soldiers without armour and even cities without gates.

The Zhuang people of Nong Zhigao's army during the Nong Zhigao rebellions (1042, 1048, 1052) fought in units of three. One person held a large shield while the other two threw javelins.

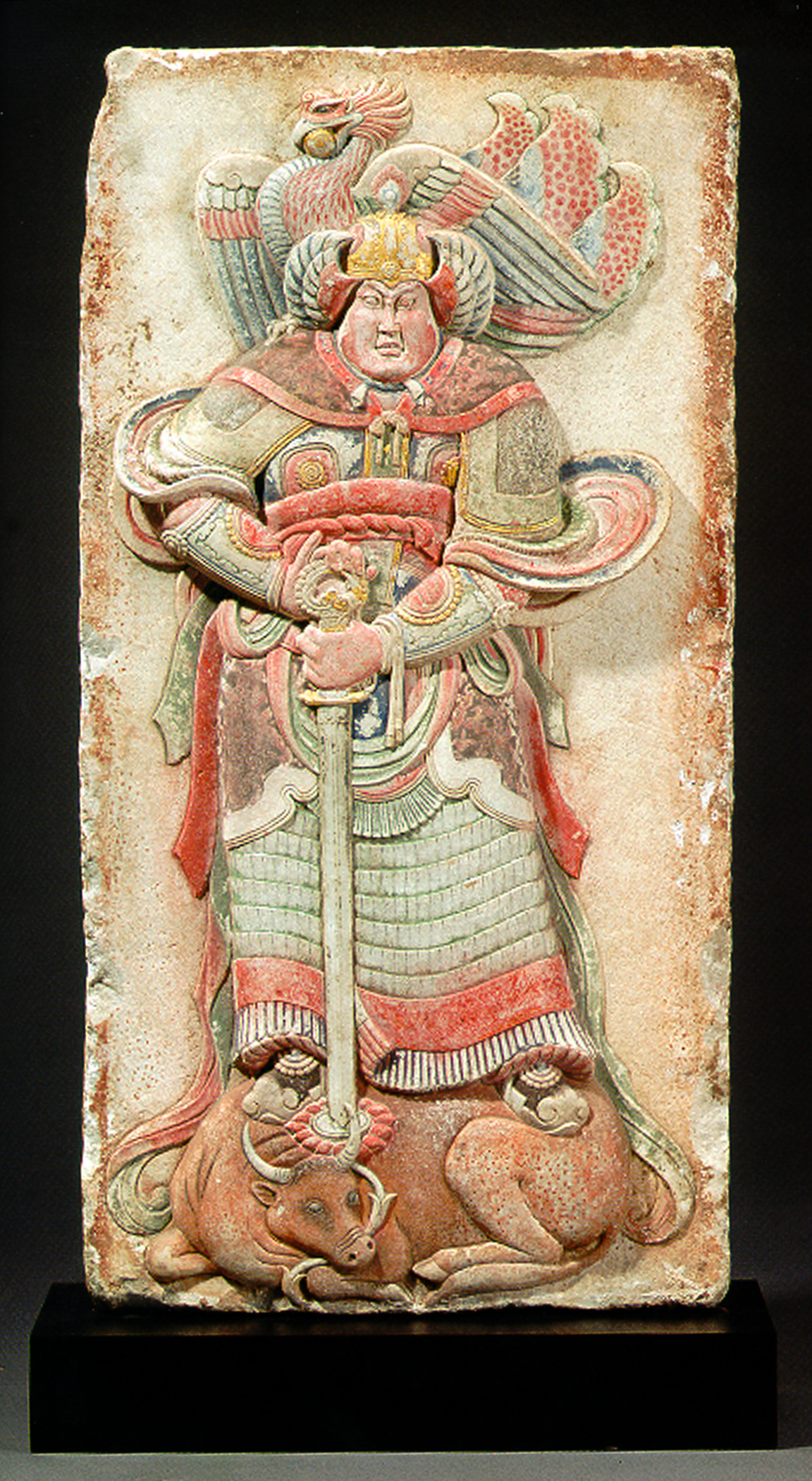
Song wall panel from the tomb of Wang Chuzhi depicting a deity wearing lamellar armoured skirt and winged helmet.

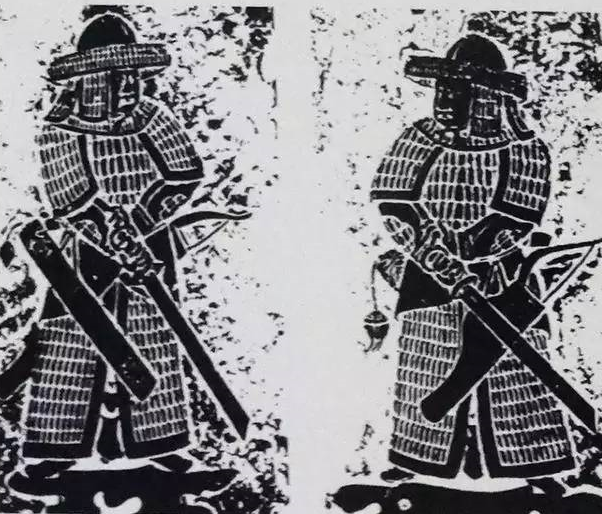
Song guards with lamellar armour

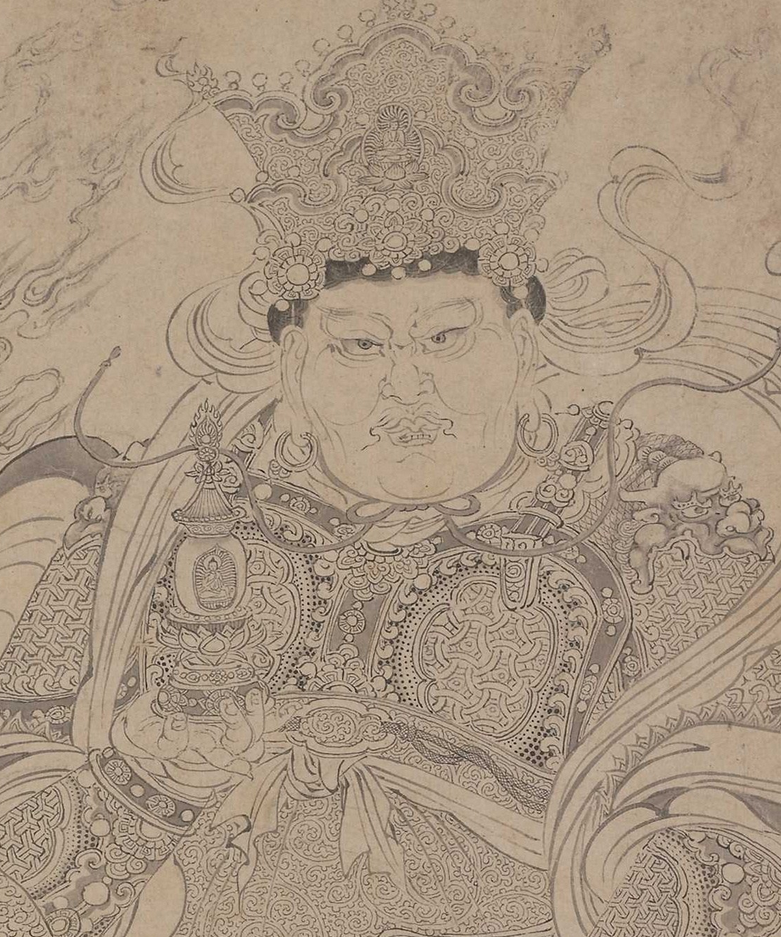
Song deity wearing mail and mountain pattern armour

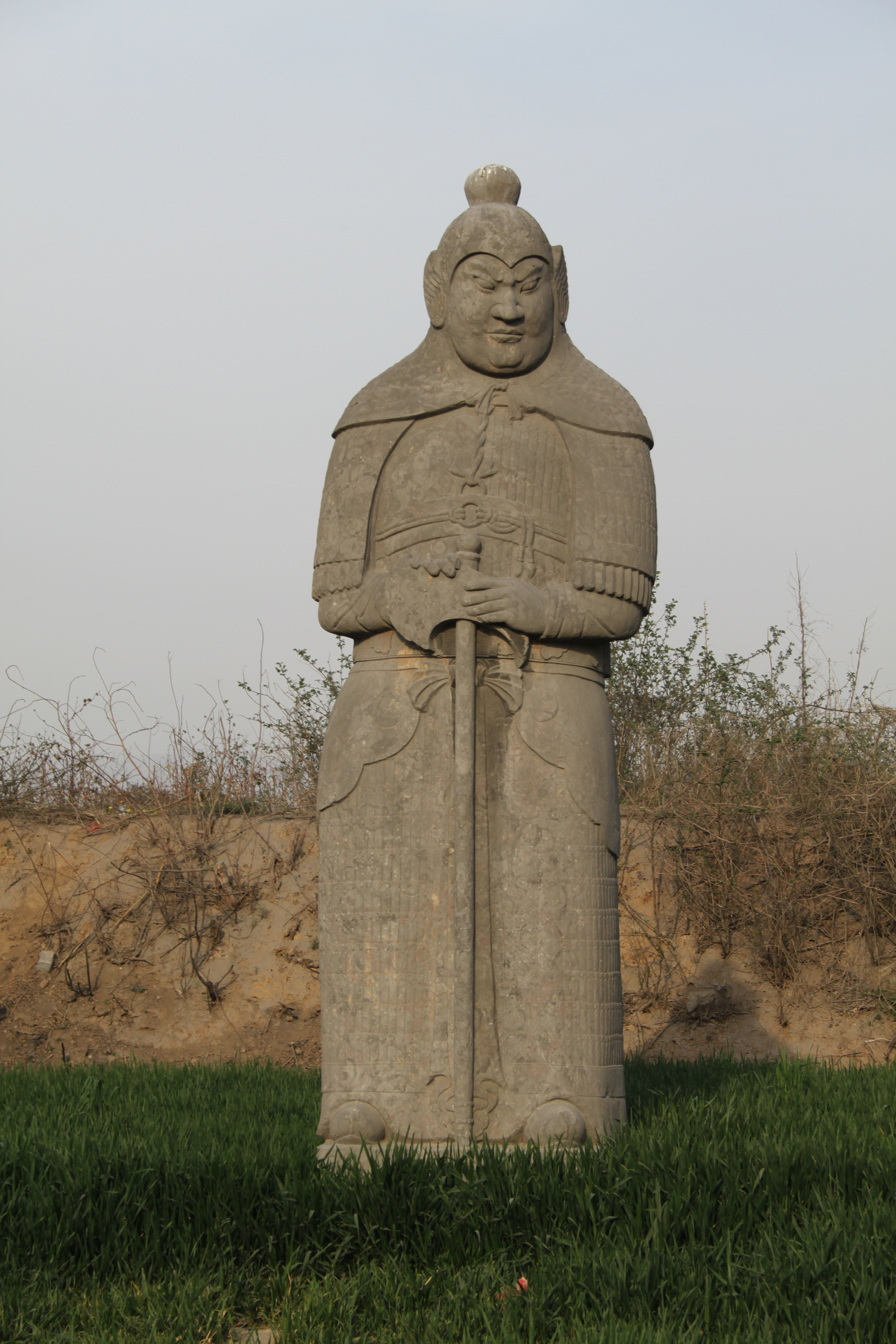
Song tomb guardian wearing a winged helmet, mountain pattern coif and lamellar armor.

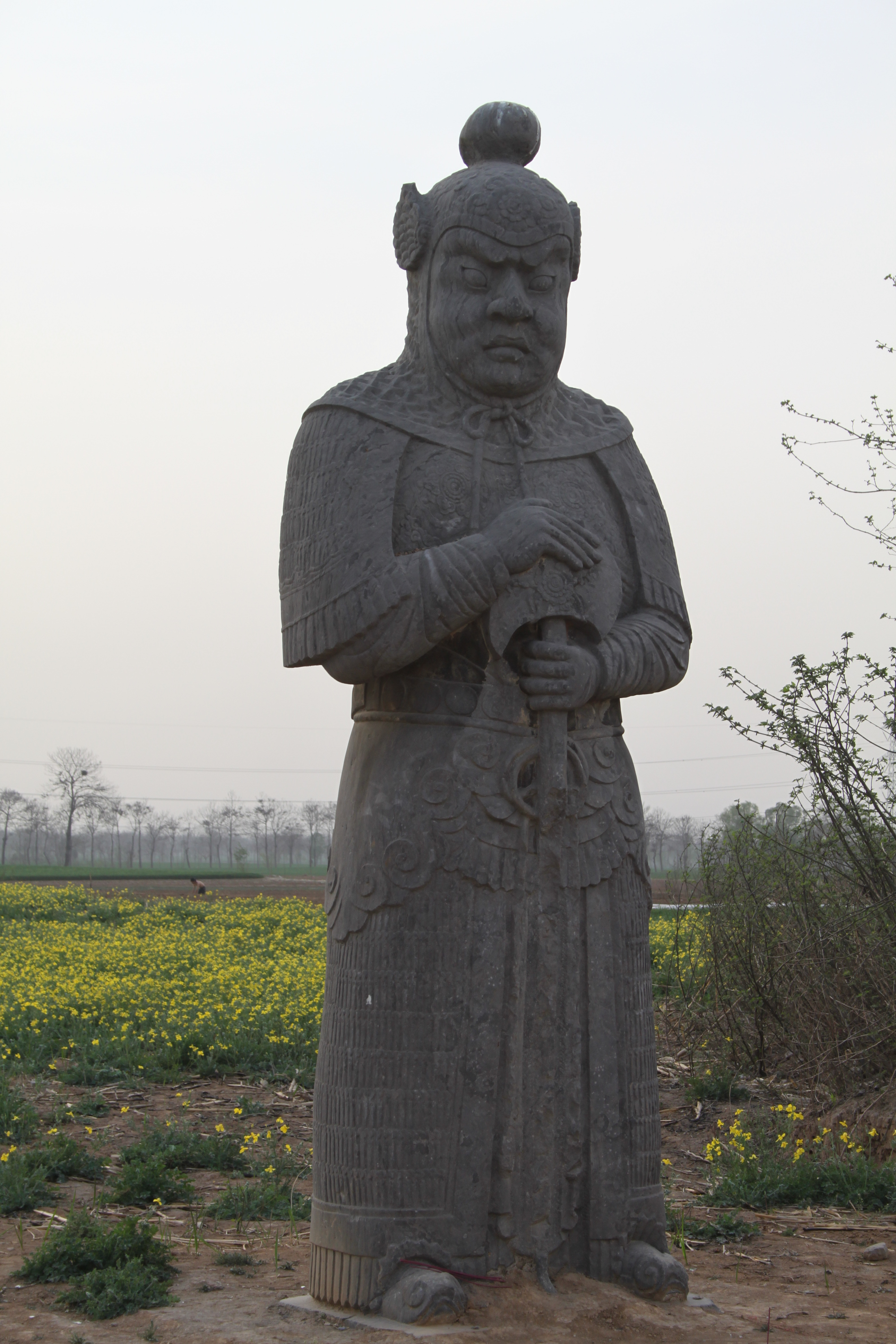
Song tomb guardian wearing a mountain pattern coif, cord and plaque, and a lamellar skirt

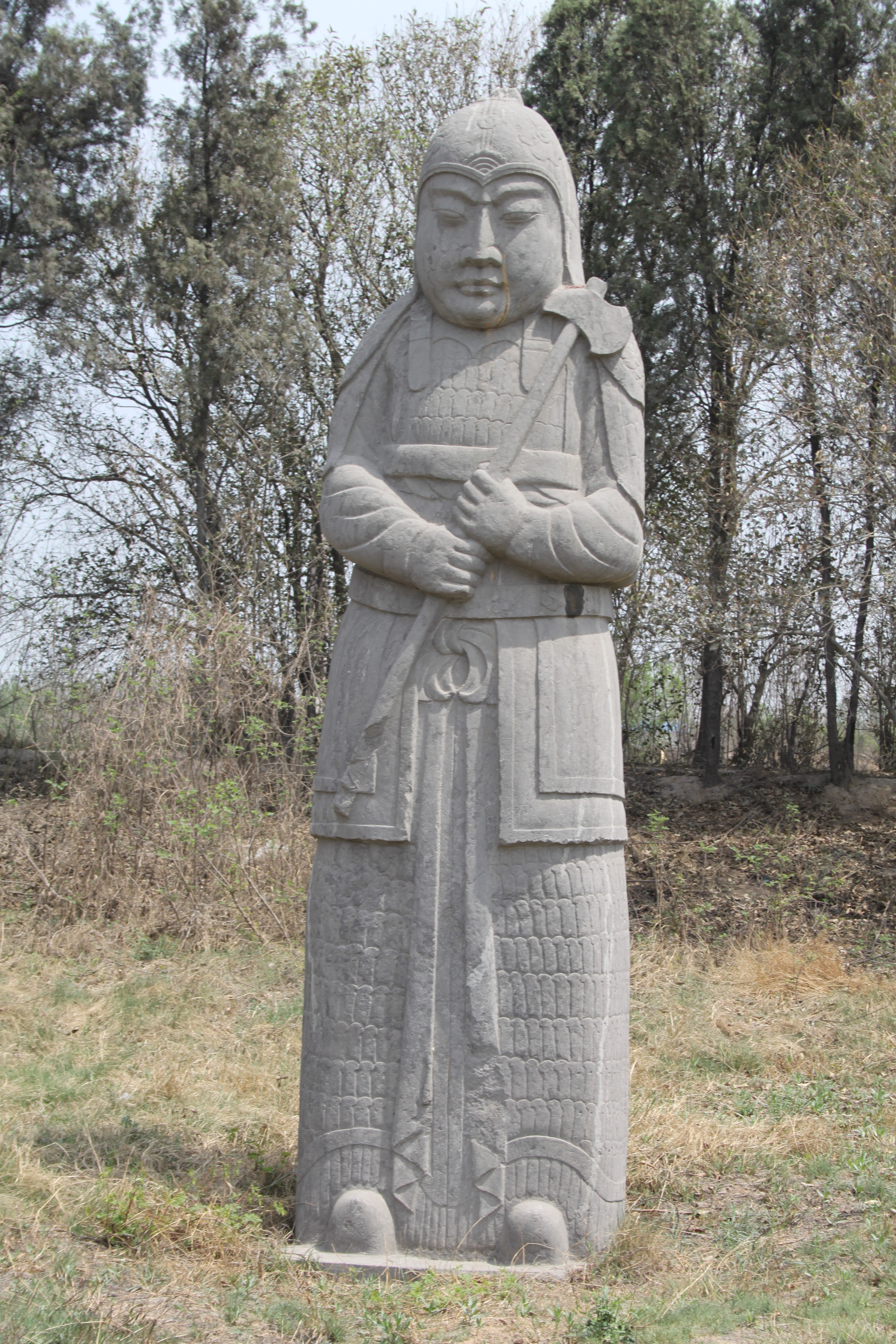
Song tomb guardian in lamellar armour holding an axe

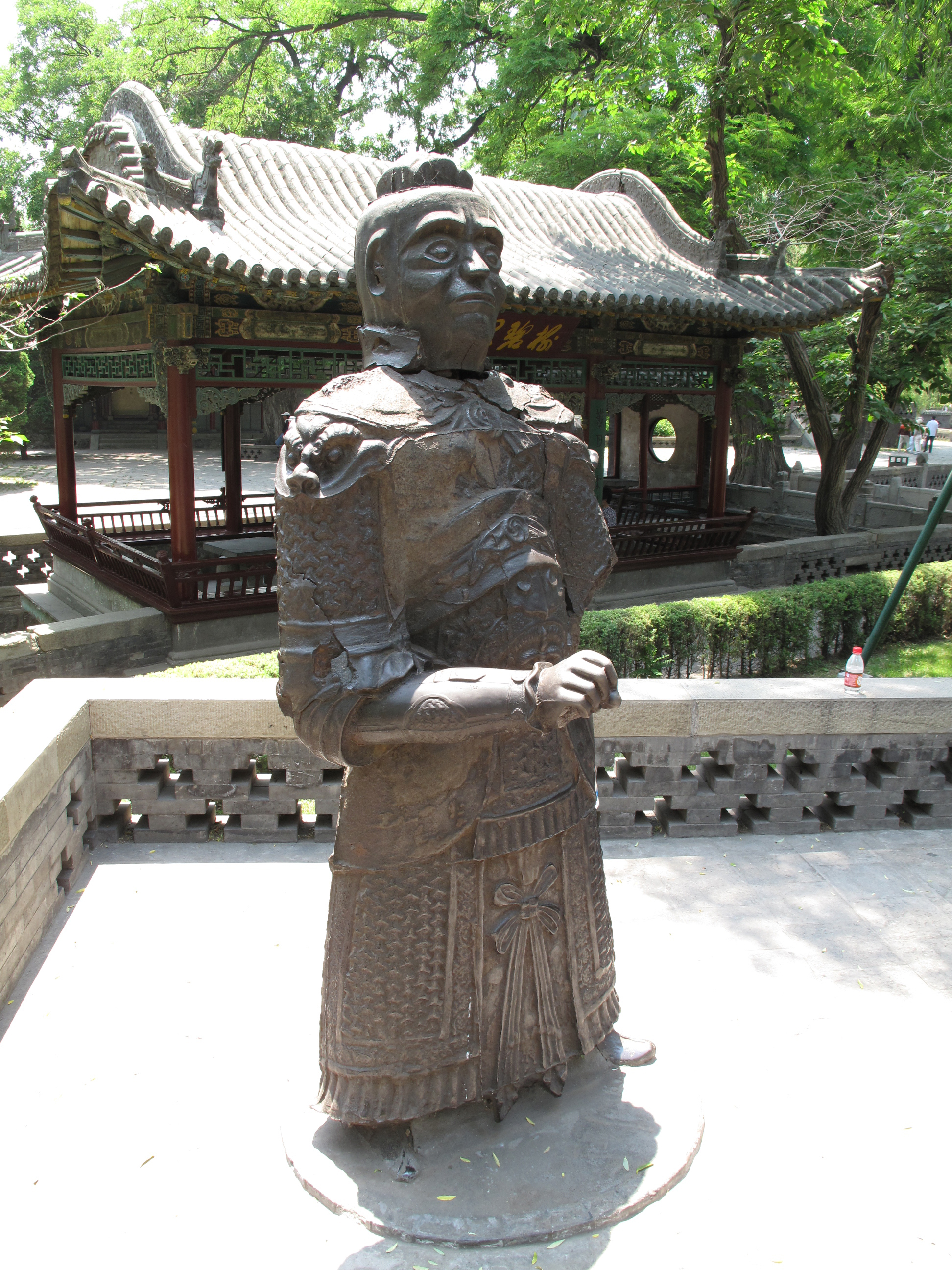
Iron statue depicting mountain pattern armour, Song dynasty, ca. 1094-1098

=== Western Xia (1038–1227) ===
The Western Xia made modest use of heavy cavalry, of which it had 3,000 at its height.

=== Jurchen Jin dynasty (1115–1234) ===
The Jurchens had a reputation for making high quality armour and weapons. Both metal and quilted armour were worn by Jurchens. The Jurchen army was organized into units of a thousand and a hundred. Every hundred was composed of two fifty men social and economic units called punian. Each punian was supposed to have 20 men equipped with armour and lances or halberds. These 20 men formed a standard two rank five deep battle formation while the others formed three ranks of archers.

The men of Jin have completed their manufacture of new weapons. They have melted and destroyed the arms in the old capital. But their newly manufactured armors are too heavy and difficult to put on, and the swords which they manufactured are so long that they are difficult to pull out from the scabbards.

— A report on the state of the Jin army submitted to the Song court on 14 August 1161

In 1232 the Jurchens used cast iron bombs against the Mongols at the siege of Kaifeng. The History of Jin states that the fire created by the blast could penetrate even iron armour.

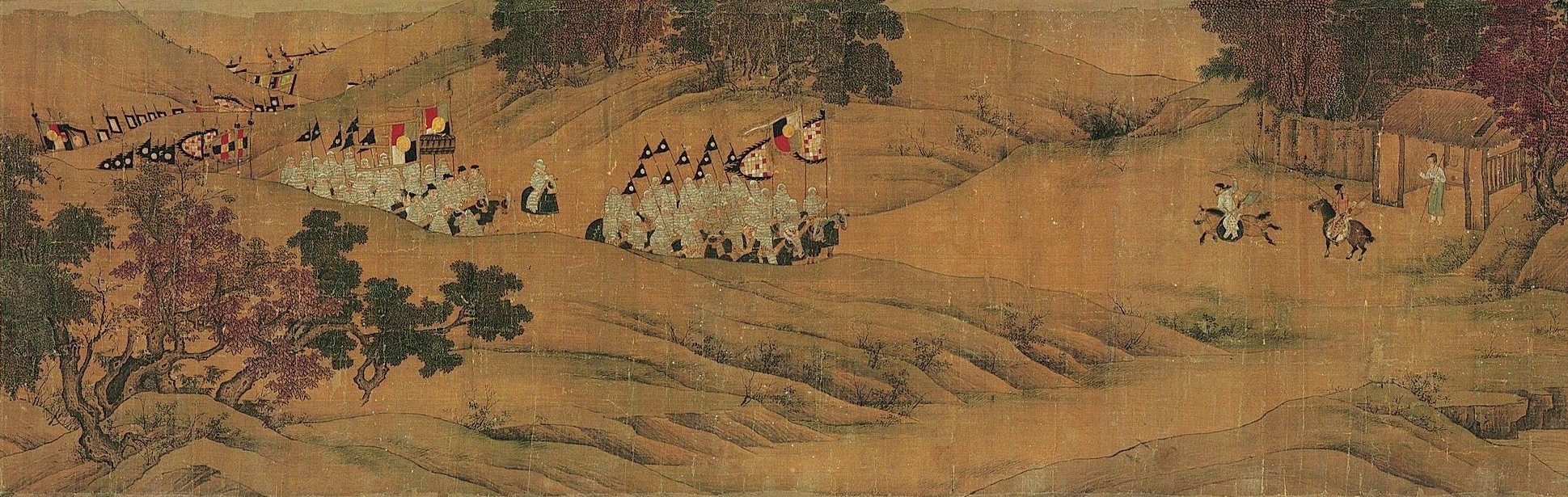
Jurchen "iron pagoda" cavalry from the scroll painting Ruiyingtu, Song dynasty

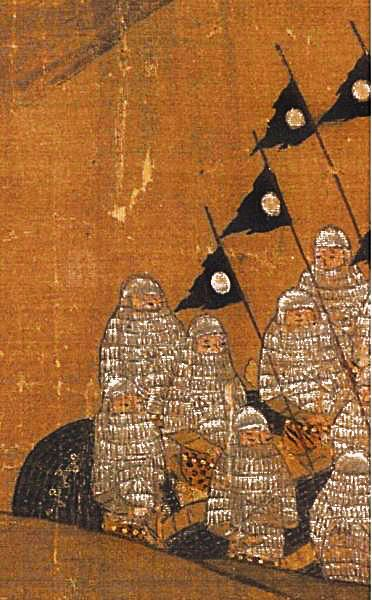
Jurchen "iron pagoda" cavalry

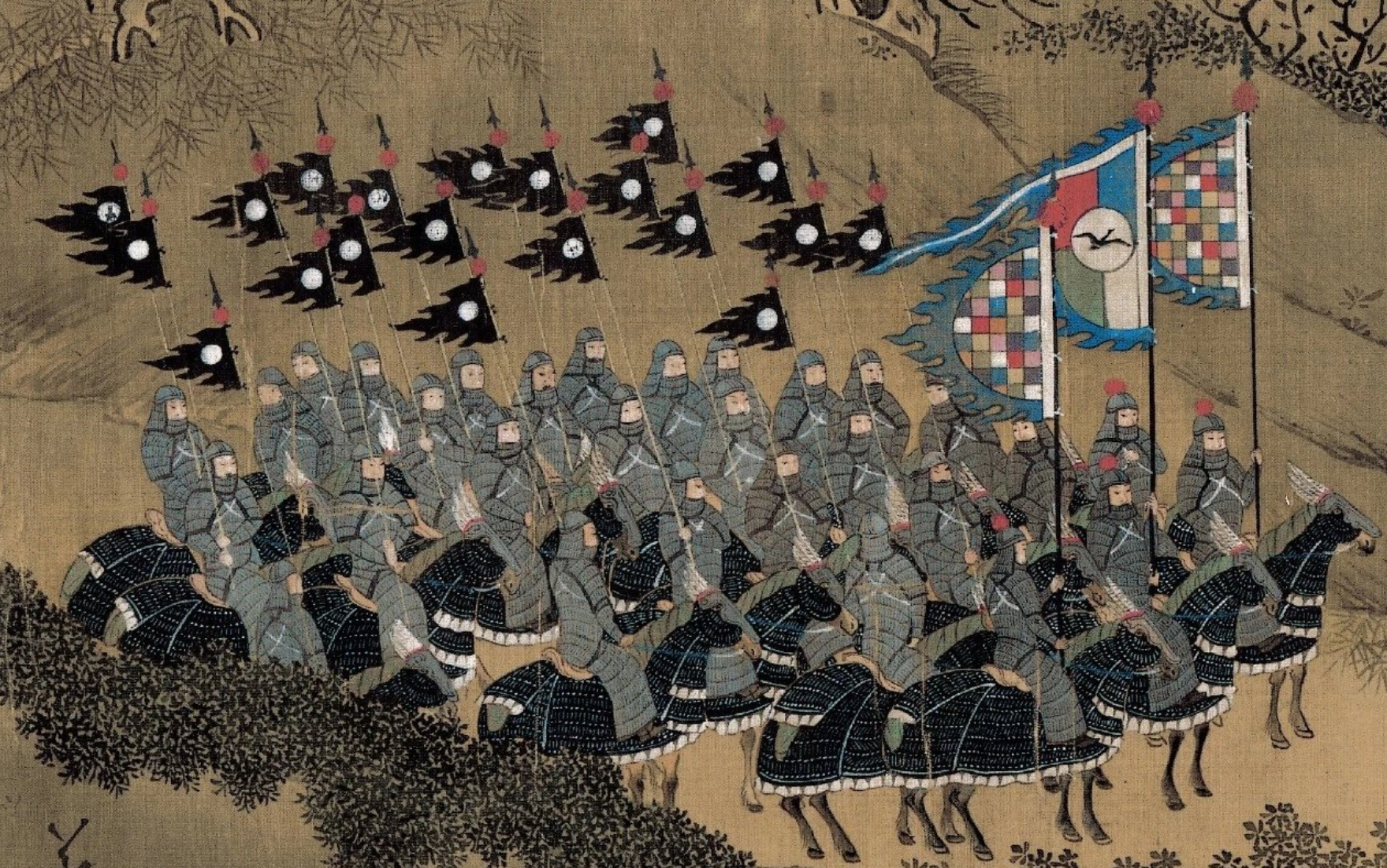
Ming dynasty copy of the painting depicting "iron pagoda" cavalry

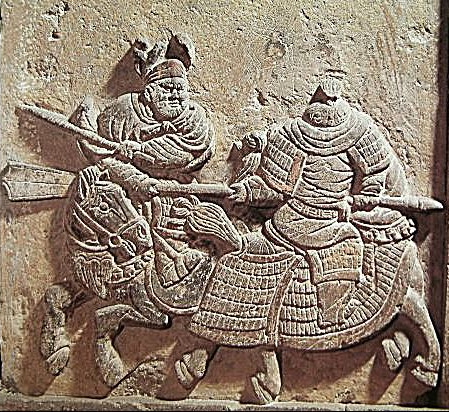
Relief of a Jin rider facing off against a Song cavalryman

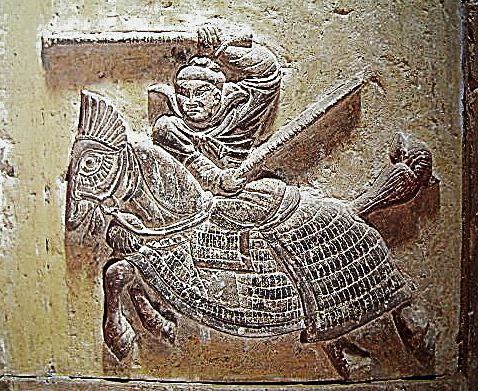
Jin depiction of Song cavalry

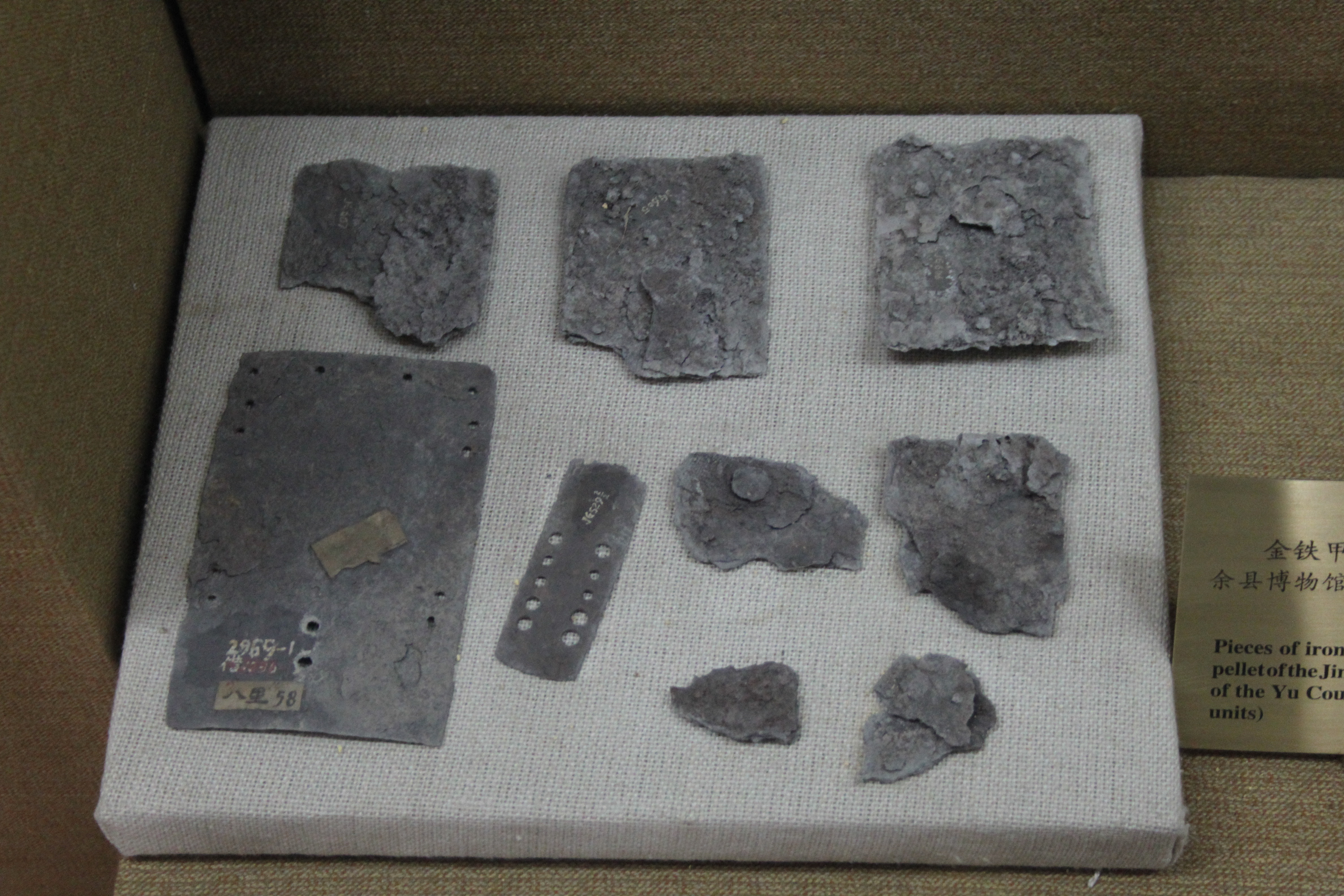
Jin lamellar armour

=== Yuan dynasty (1271–1368) ===
According to Meng Hong, the reason for the Mongols' success was that they possessed more iron than previous steppe peoples. However this may have only been relative to earlier tribes. According to Su Ding (1237), the Mongols only gained access to blacksmiths who could make armour and arrows for them in 1209 when the Uyghurs submitted. By the time they were in conflict with the Jin dynasty, they were apparently better armoured than previous nomad invaders.

Both Chinese and European sources concur that Mongols wore substantial armour capable of stopping arrows. A Song source notes that one way to pierce heavily clad Mongol warriors was to use small arrows capable of entering the eye slits of their helmet. According to Thomas the Archdeacon, Mongol arrows were capable of penetrating all known types of armour at the time, but their own leather armour could withstand the arrows of their enemies. However he also mentions that the Mongols feared crossbows. Giovanni da Pian del Carpine recommended European knights wear two layers of chain mail armour because one layer was incapable of stopping Mongol arrows. Not all the Mongols wore heavy armour. According to The History of Kart'li, the Mongol invasion of Georgia in 1221 was only equipped lightly with bow and arrows.

Giovanni da Pian del Carpine describing Mongol lamellar armour:

The upper part of their helmet is of iron or steel, while that part guarding the neck and throat is of leather. Whereas the majority wear leather armour, some have their harness completely wrought from iron, which is made in the following manner. They beat out in large numbers thin iron plates a finger broad and a full hand long. In each they bore eight small holes, through which they pull three straight leather thongs. Thereupon they arrange these plates one above another, as it were, ascending by degrees, and tie the plates to the thongs mentioned by means of other small and tender thongs drawn through the holes. And in the upper part they fasten a single, small thong, doubled on each side, and sewn on to another, that the plates may be well and tightly knit together. Thus a uniform protection is effected by these plates, and such like armour is made for their horses as well as for their men. It is so highly polished that a man may mirror his face in it.

— Giovanni da Pian del Carpine

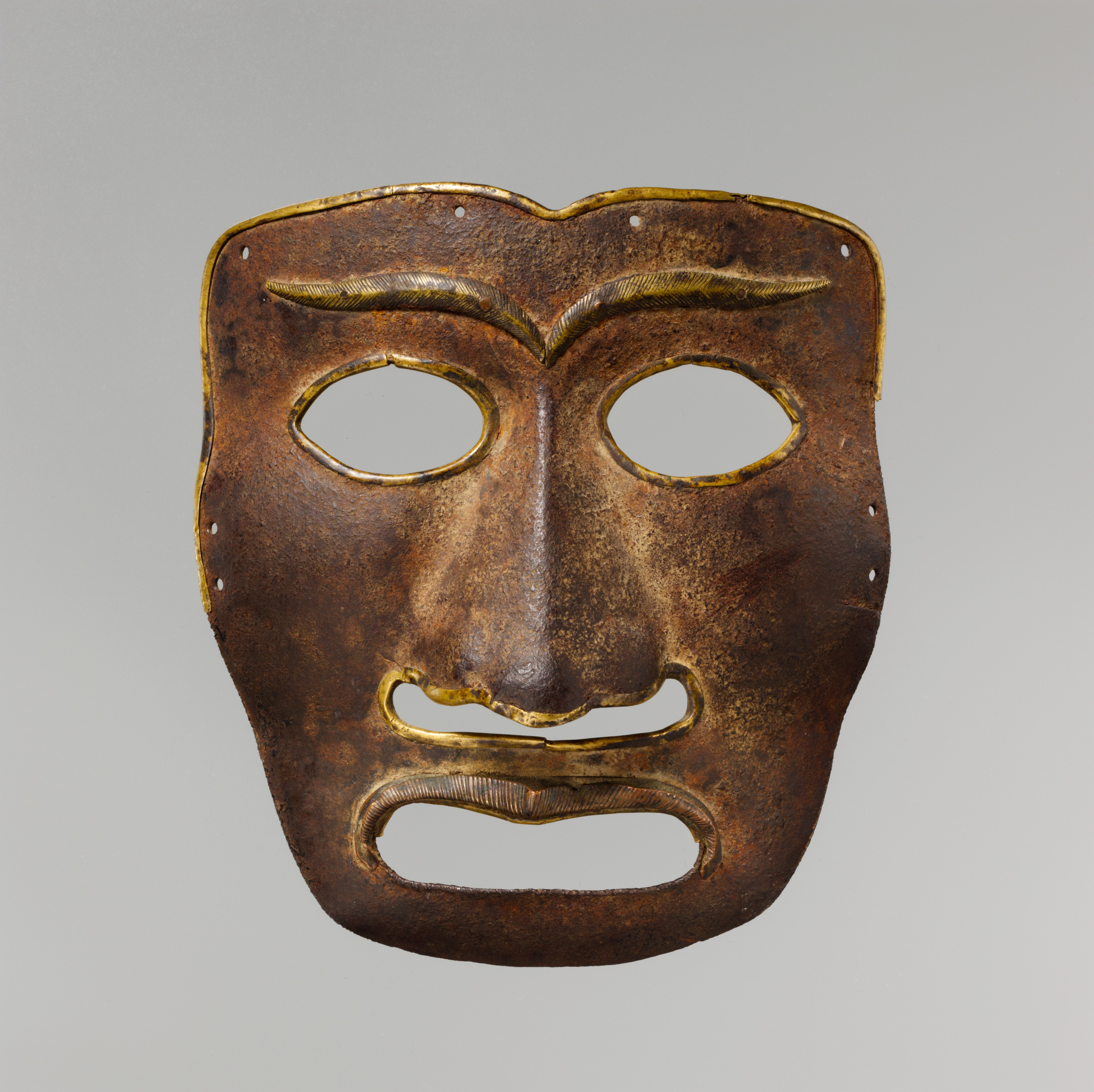
Mongol war mask, 12–14th century. One of the only two Mongolian or Tibetan armour masks.

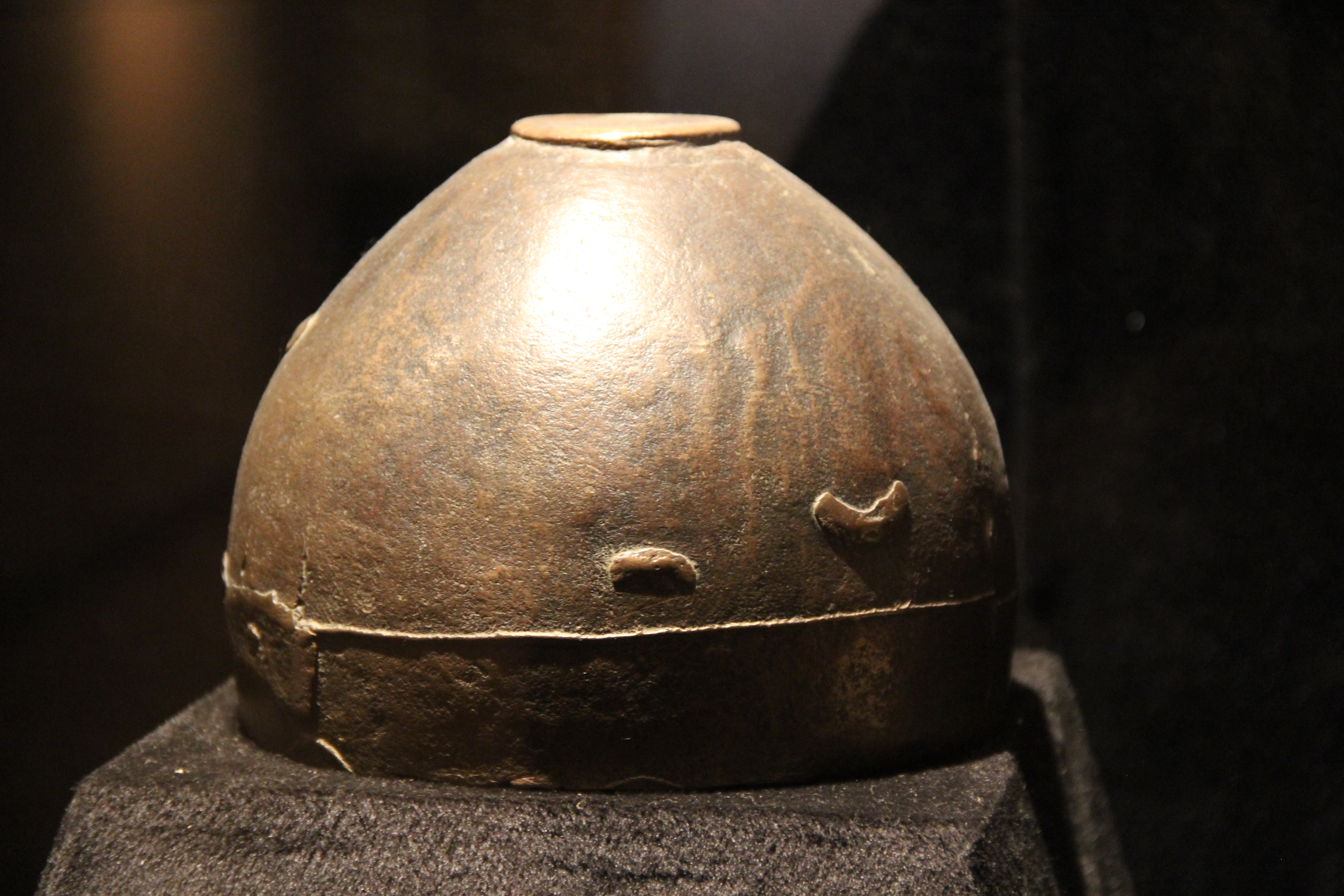
Iron helmet, Mongol Empire

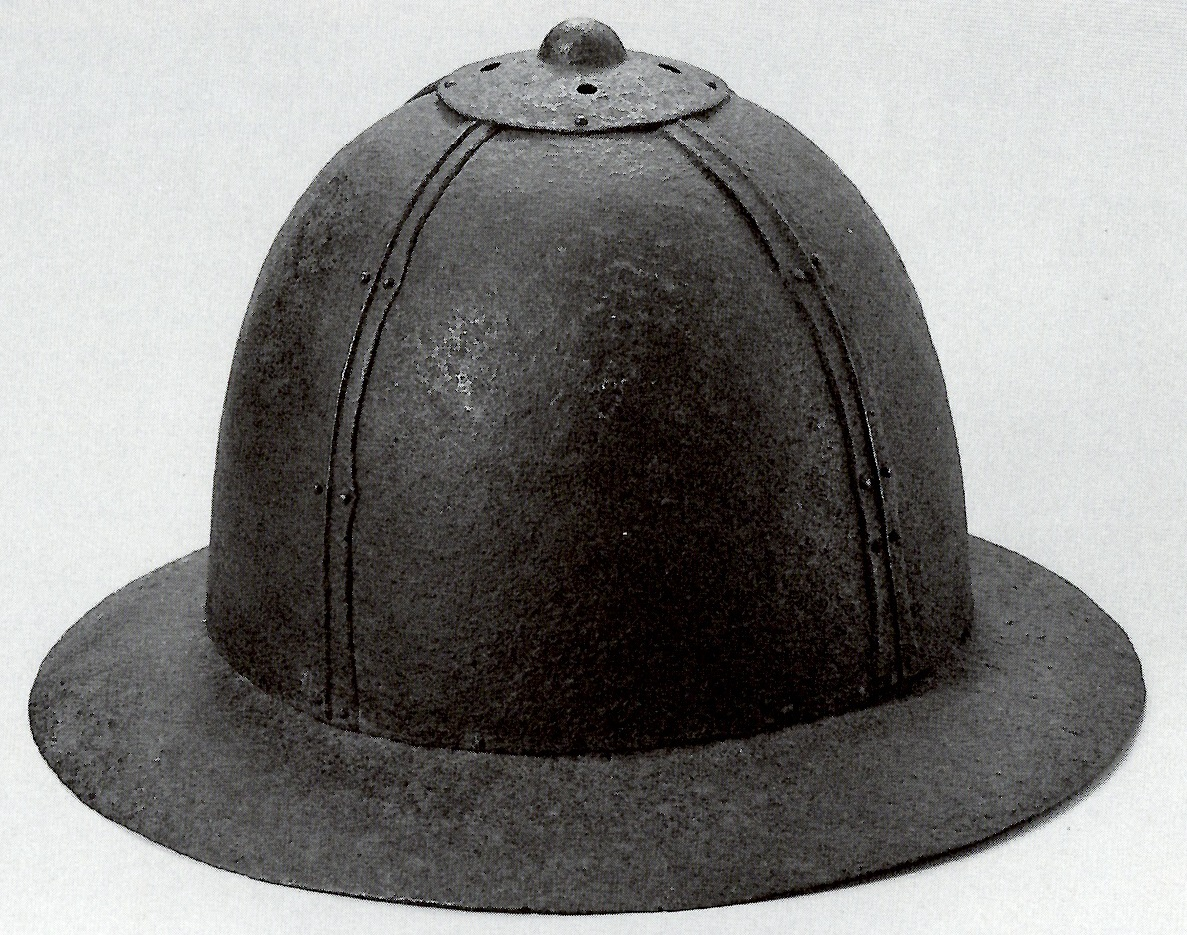
Yuan helmet

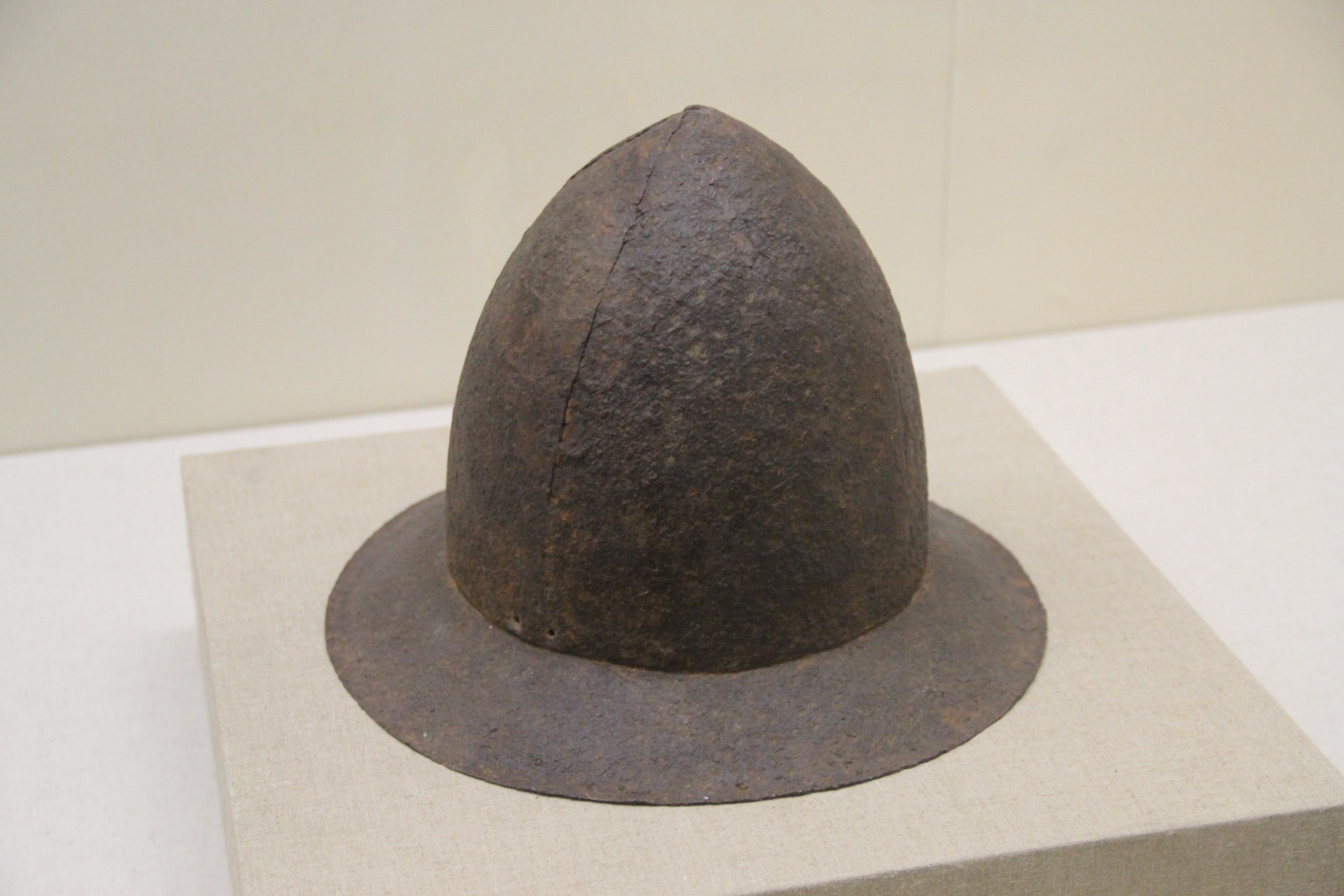
Yuan helmet

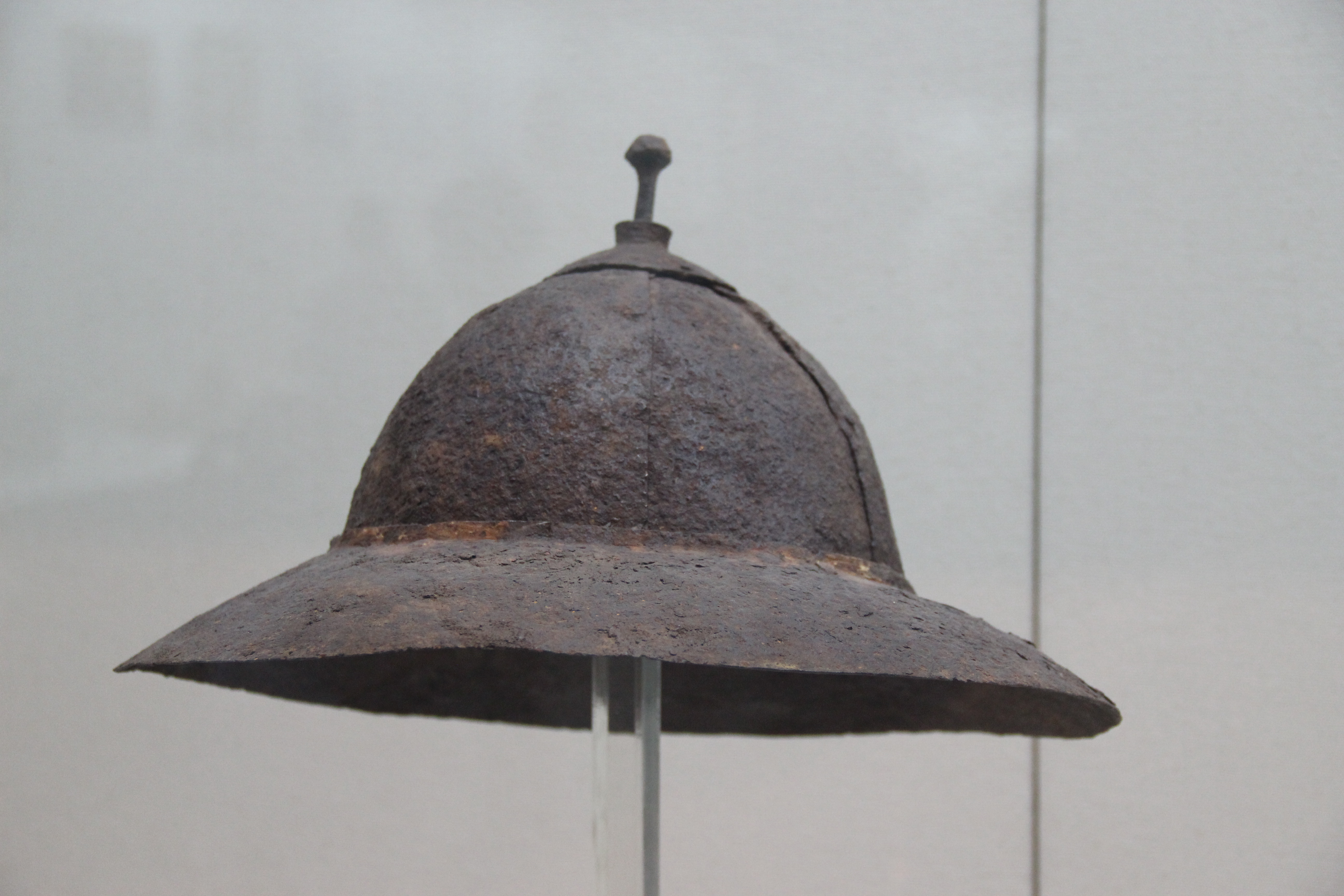
Yuan helmet with wide brim

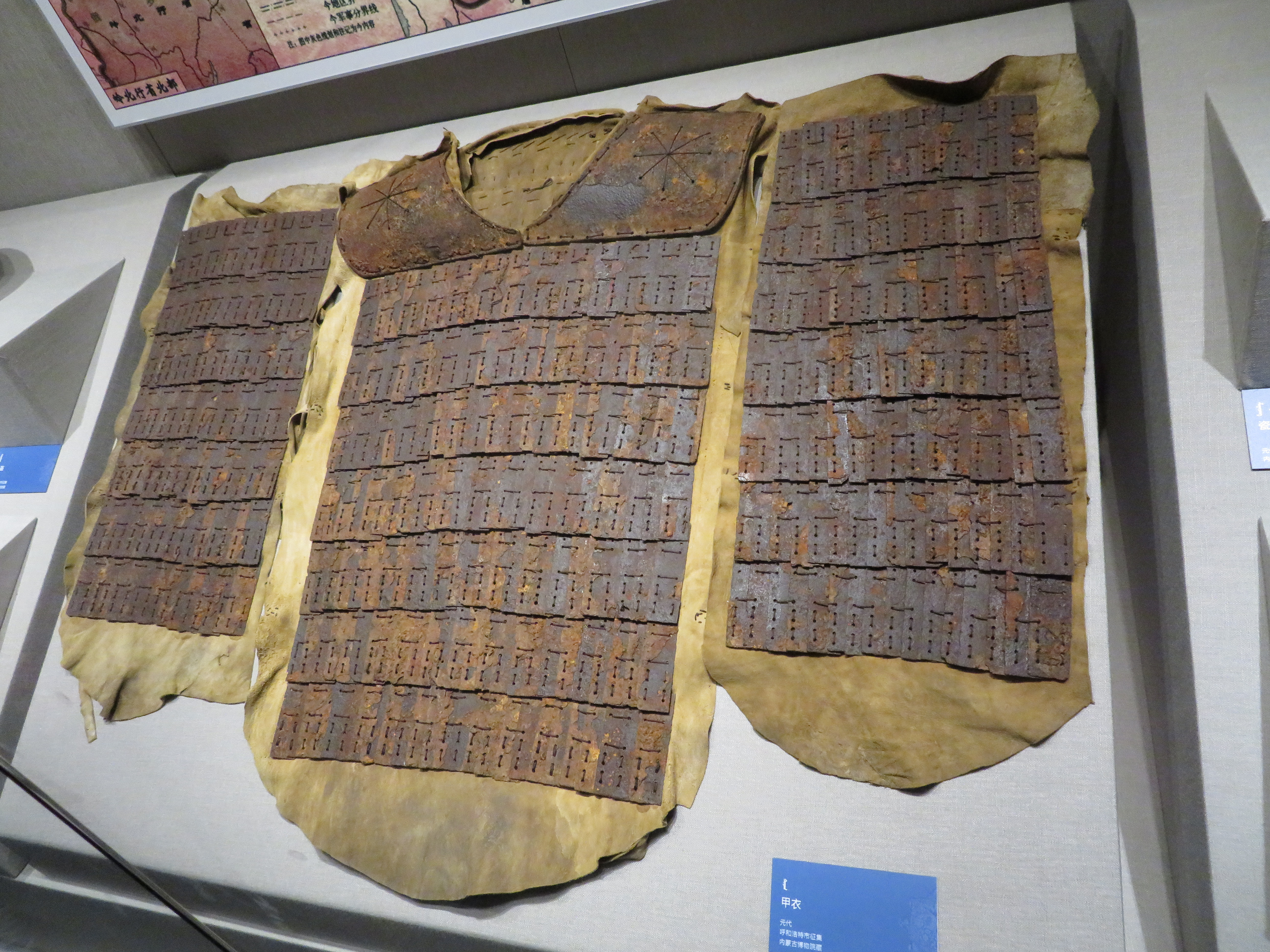
Yuan lamellar armour

== Late imperial armour ==
=== Ming dynasty (1368–1644) ===
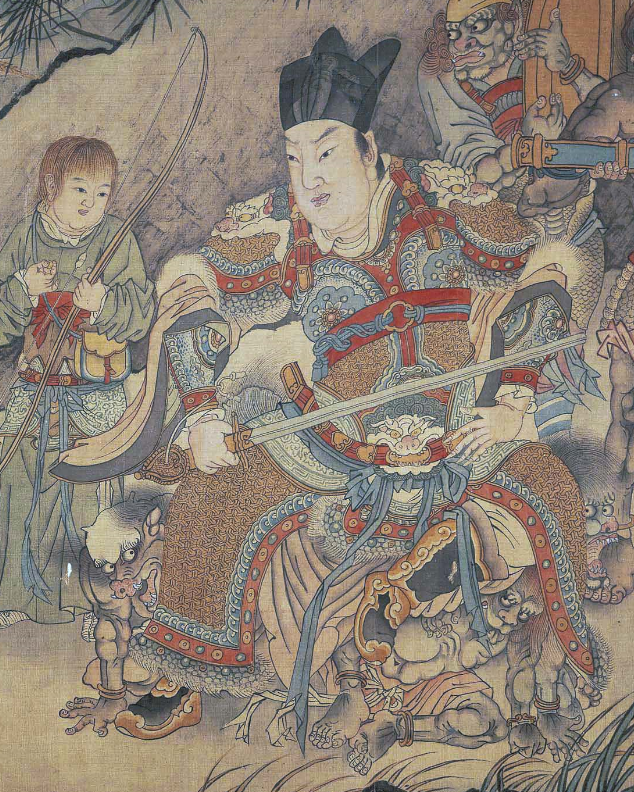
Ming warrior in mountain pattern armour

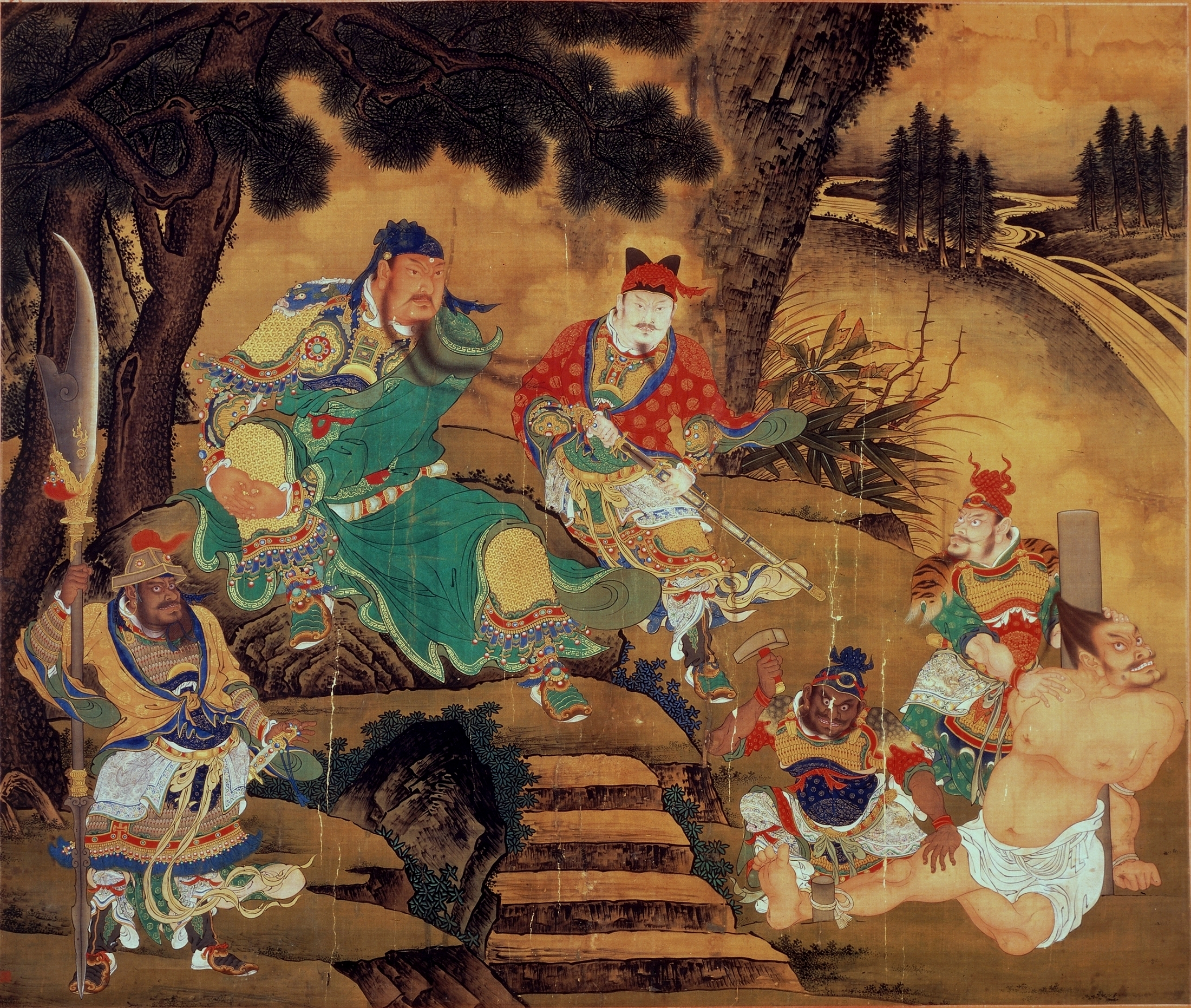
Guan Yu in mountain pattern armour

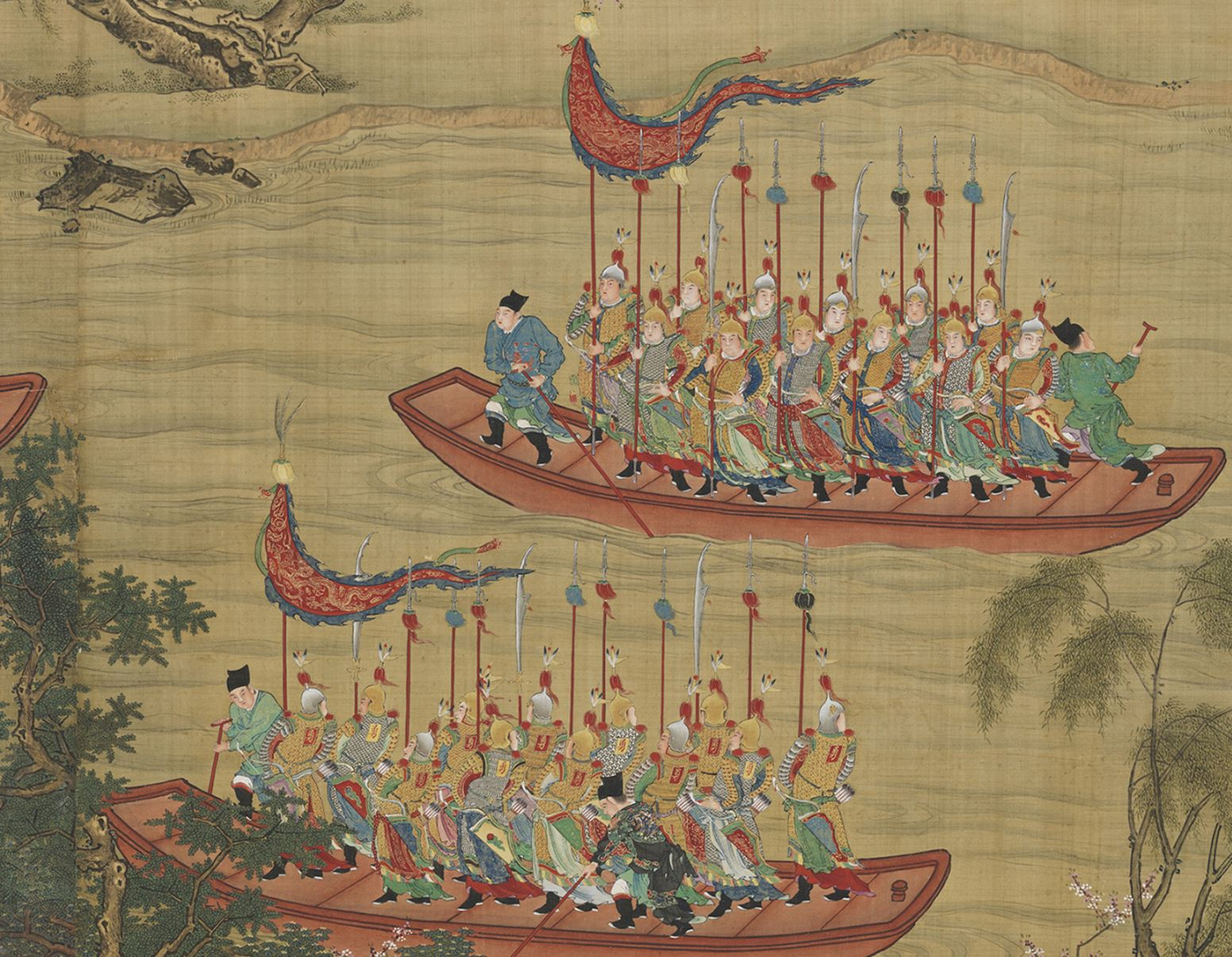
Ming warriors holding polearm weapons on transport boats

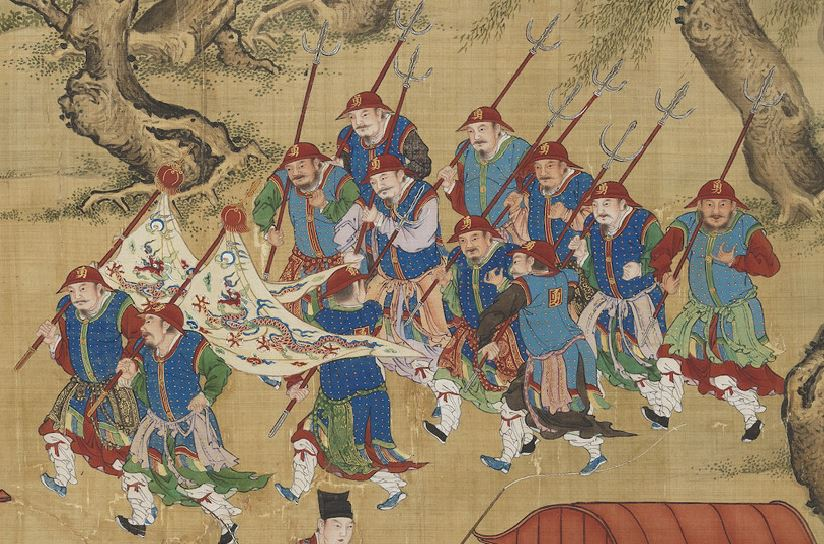
Ming soldiers in brigandine armour

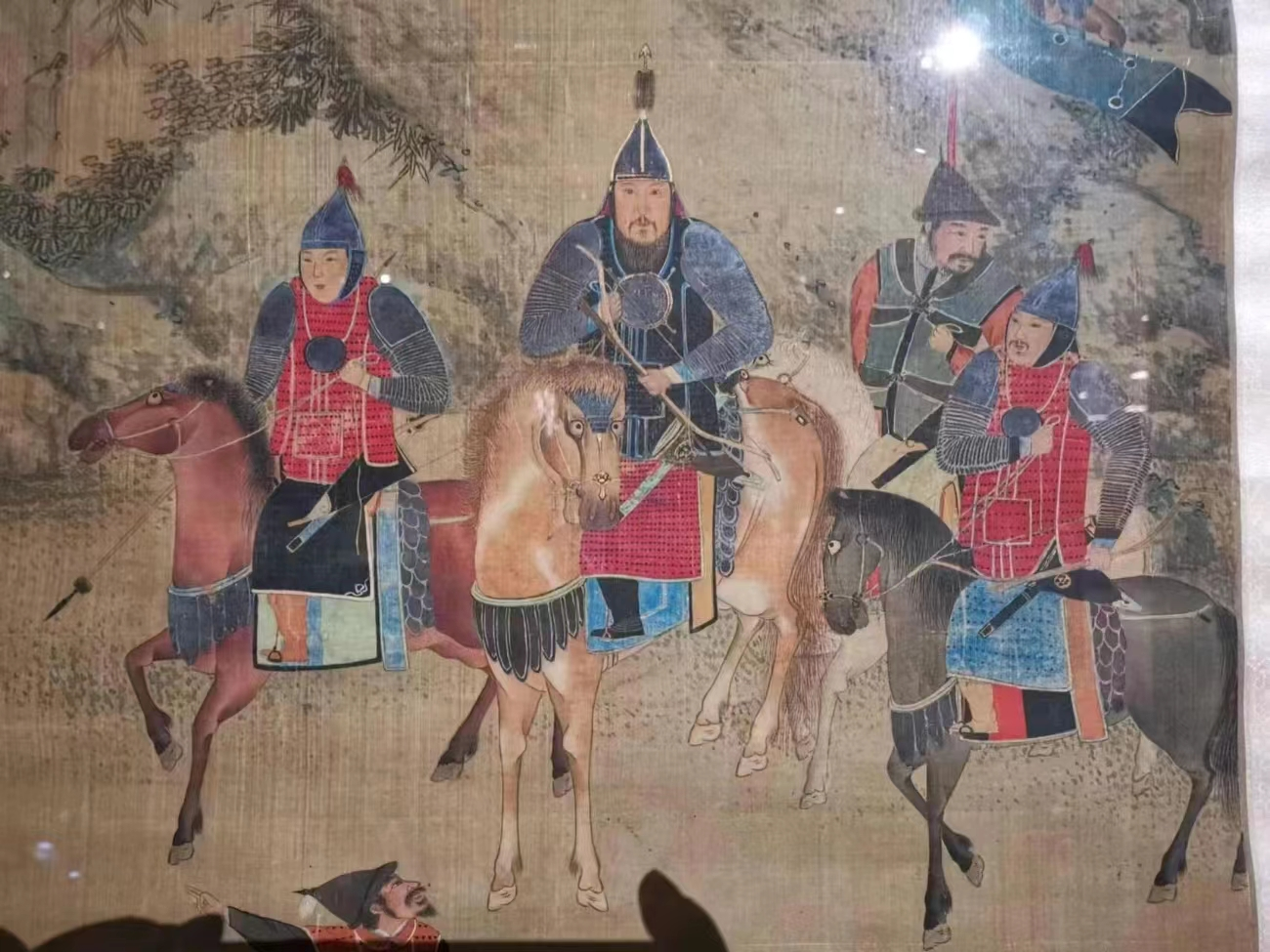
Ming Soldiers Marching in brigandine armour

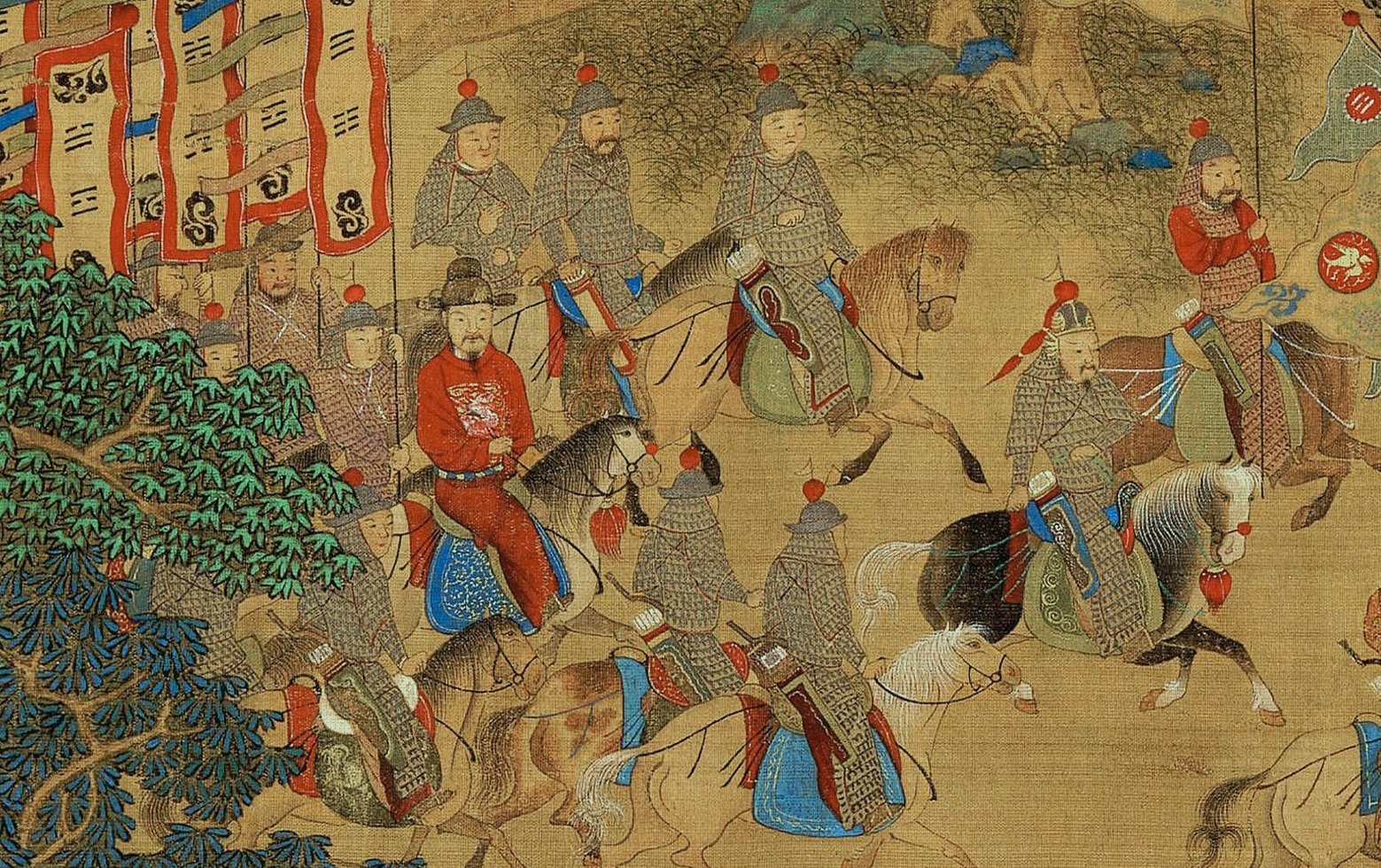
Ming cavalry soldiers led by government official and officer wearing winged helmet.

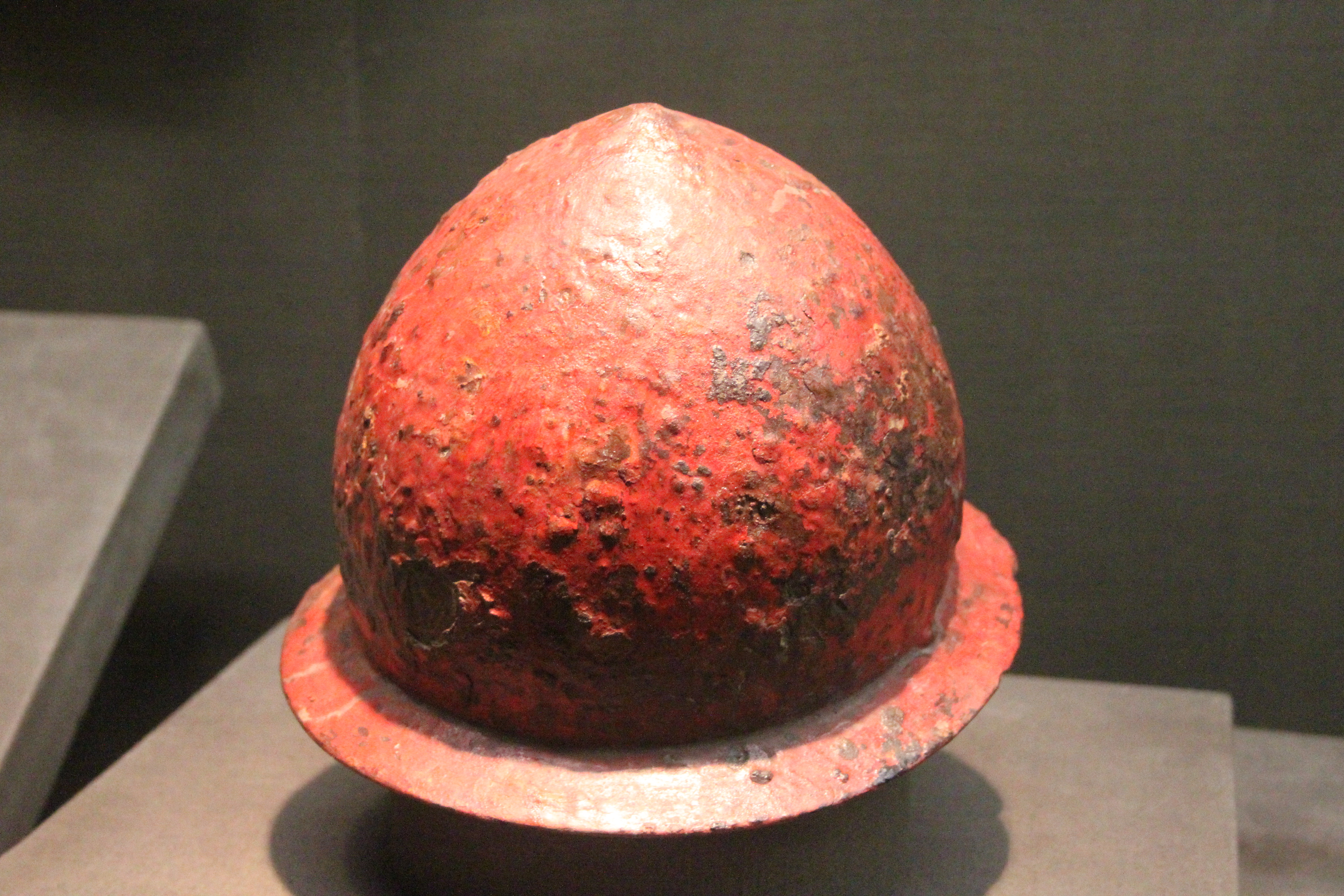
Lacquered Iron Helmet from Tomb of Ming Prince Liangzhuang

Although armour never lost all meaning during the Ming dynasty, it became less and less important as the power of firearms became apparent. It was already acknowledged by the early Ming artillery officer Jiao Yu that guns "were found to behave like flying dragons, able to penetrate layers of armor." Fully armoured soldiers could be and were killed by guns. The Ming Marshall Cai was one such victim. An account from the enemy side states, "Our troops used fire tubes to shoot and fell him, and the great army quickly lifted him and carried him back to his fortifications." It is possible that Chinese armour had some success in blocking musket balls later on during the Ming dynasty. A composite shield made of several layers of material known as the Duo Qian Fang Pai (Lead-catching defence shield) was specifically designed to stop bullets. According to the Japanese, during the Battle of Jiksan, the Chinese wore armour and used shields that were at least partially bulletproof. Frederick Coyett later described Ming lamellar armour as providing complete protection from "small arms", although this is sometimes mistranslated as "rifle bullets".

Some were armed with bows and arrows hanging down their backs; others had nothing save a shield on the left arm and a good sword in the right hand; while many wielded with both hands a formidable battle-sword fixed to a stick half the length of a man. Everyone was protected over the upper part of the body with a coat of iron scales, fitting below one another like the slates of a roof; the arms and legs being left bare. This afforded complete protection from rifle bullets (mistranslation-should read "small arms") and yet left ample freedom to move, as those coats only reached down to the knees and were very flexible at all the joints. The archers formed Koxinga's best troops, and much depended on them, for even at a distance they contrived to handle their weapons with so great skill that they very nearly eclipsed the riflemen. The shield bearers were used instead of cavalry. Every tenth man of them is a leader, who takes charge of, and presses his men on, to force themselves into the ranks of the enemy. With bent heads and their bodies hidden behind the shields, they try to break through the opposing ranks with such fury and dauntless courage as if each one had still a spare body left at home. They continually press onwards, notwithstanding many are shot down; not stopping to consider, but ever rushing forward like mad dogs, not even looking round to see whether they are followed by their comrades or not. Those with the sword-sticks—called soapknives by the Hollanders—render the same service as our lancers in preventing all breaking through of the enemy, and in this way establishing perfect order in the ranks; but when the enemy has been thrown into disorder, the Sword-bearers follow this up with fearful massacre amongst the fugitives.

— Frederick Coyett

According to the Jixiao Xinshu, written in 1584, rattan shields were preferable to wooden shields in the south because they were lighter and easier to use in muddy and rainy conditions and on the sloped pathways of farming fields. Rattan shields were sometimes paired with javelins, which were used to distract the enemy. The writer considered the rattan shields ineffective against guns.

Rocket handlers often wore heavy armour for extra protection so that they could fire at close range.

==== Brigandine armour ====
Brigandine armour (bumianjia (Chinese: 布面甲; Pinyin: bùmiànjiǎ)) became the most dominant form of armour, particularly in the north, during the Ming and Qing era. It consisted of riveted plates covered with fabric. Popularly known as dingjia (nailed armour), it was actually called bumianjia (cloth covered armour). It was also sometimes called anjia (dark armour) in contrast to mingjia (bright armour) which referred to lamellar.

==== Plate armour ====
Partial plate armour in the form of a cuirass sewn together with fabric is mentioned in the Wubei Yaolue, 1638. Called quantiejia (complete metal armour), the text describes the usage of 100 catties of Fujian iron, 4–5 piculs of northern coal, and over 10 piculs of southern coal in the creation process of the plates. After finishing the plates, they were lacquered and linked together using cotton and woolen ropes. A full set of quantiejia weighed around 34.4 catties. One Ming catty was around 590 grams, making a full set of quantiejia around 20 kg in weight. It's not known how common plate armour was during the Ming dynasty, and no other source mentions it. There are no records of mail and plate used together from Chinese records but the Veritable Records of the Joseon Dynasty does mention the dismissal of an official for failing to supervise the production of "Chinese mail-and-plate armour" in the 15th century.

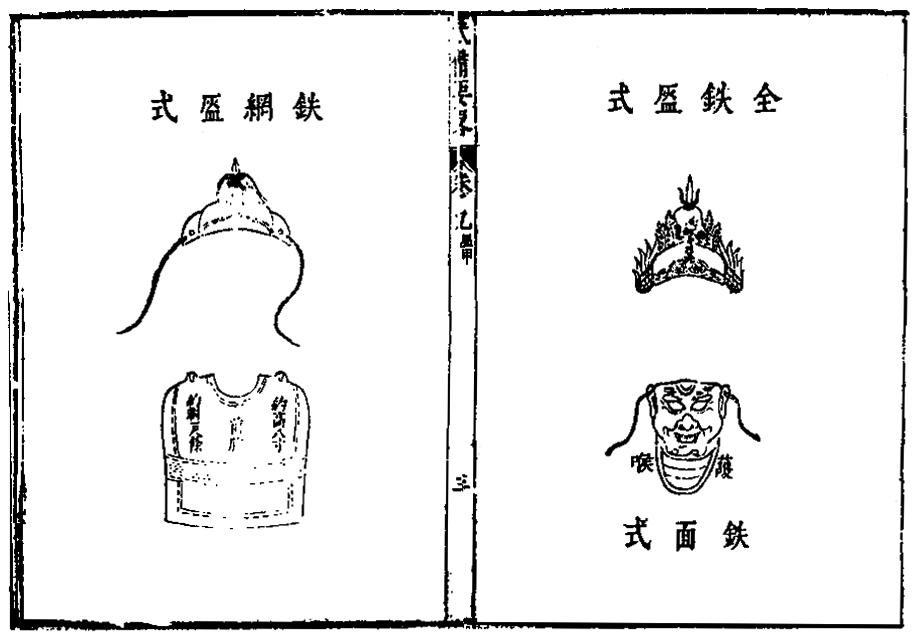
Ming helmet, breastplate, and mask from the Wubei Yaolue

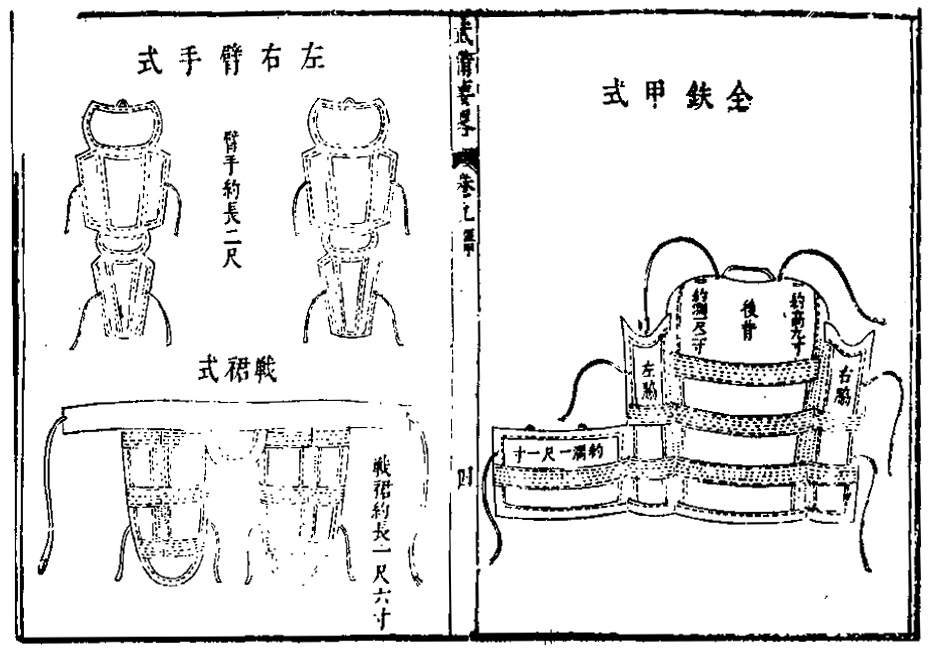
Ming arm guards, thigh armour, and back plate from the Wubei Yaolue

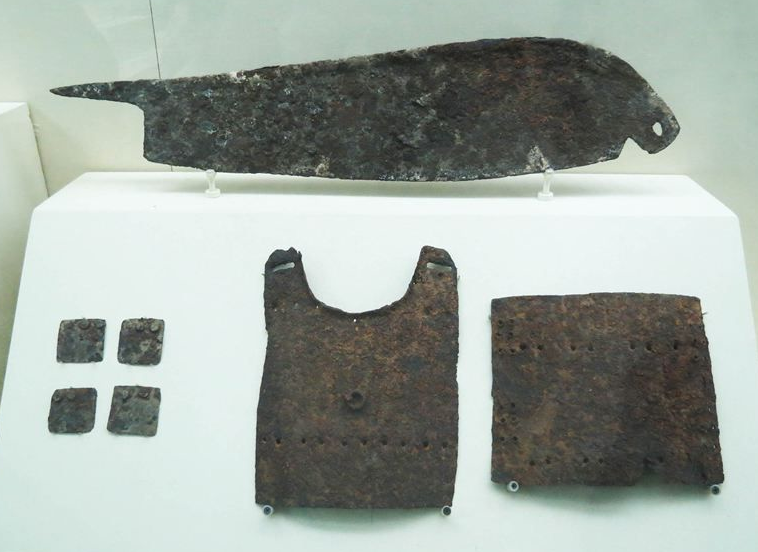
Ming plate armour

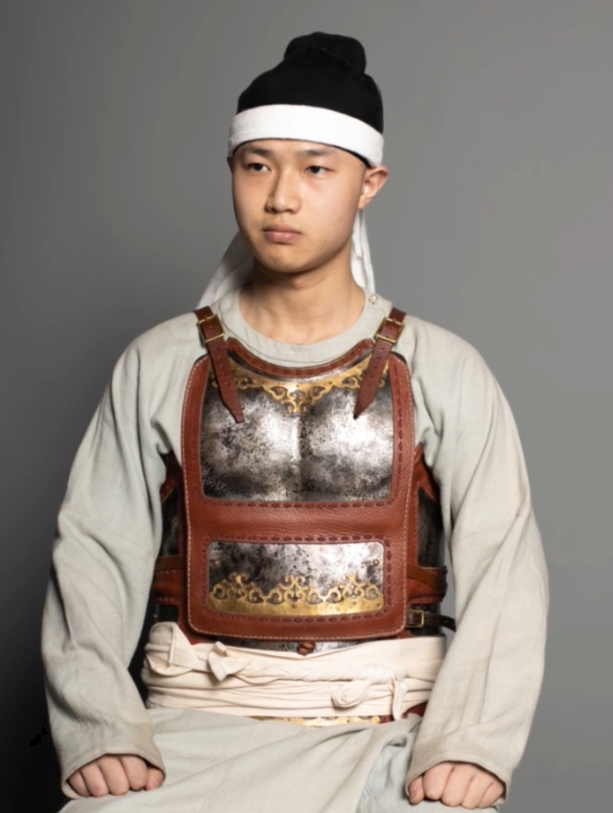
Modern replica of quantiejia

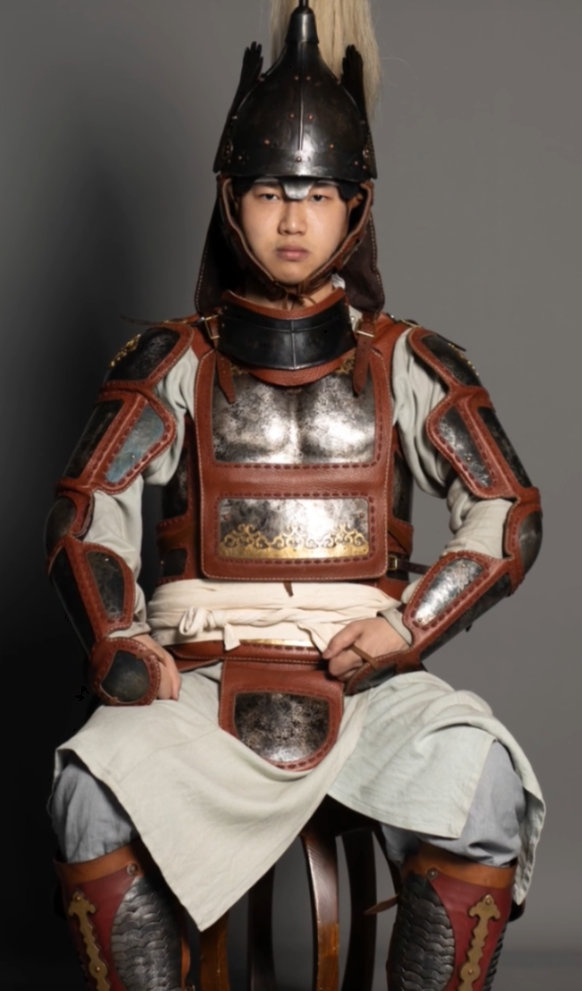
Replica front

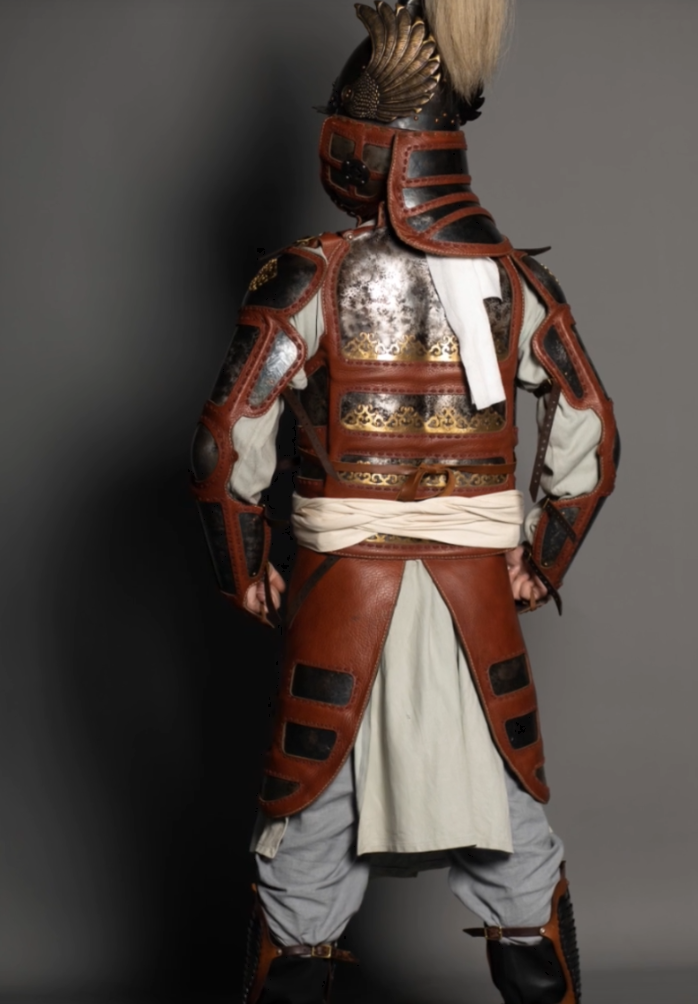
Replica back

==== Leather armour ====
Leather armour was made using cowhide. The cowhide was cut into small scales, painted with tung oil, baked dry, and then hammered together with powdered iron. This process was repeated multiple times until each piece of leather scale hardened. The hardened scales were then laced together into a suit of armour. Another version of leather armour used by sailors in Guangdong and Guangxi cut the hides into bands that were riveted together horizontally. Soldiers recruited from the miners of Chuzhou used a type of leather armour that only protected the left side of the body. The lower part of the armour was suspended by a hook to allow for ease of movement. Aside from cowhide, leather armour could also be made from pangolin hides.

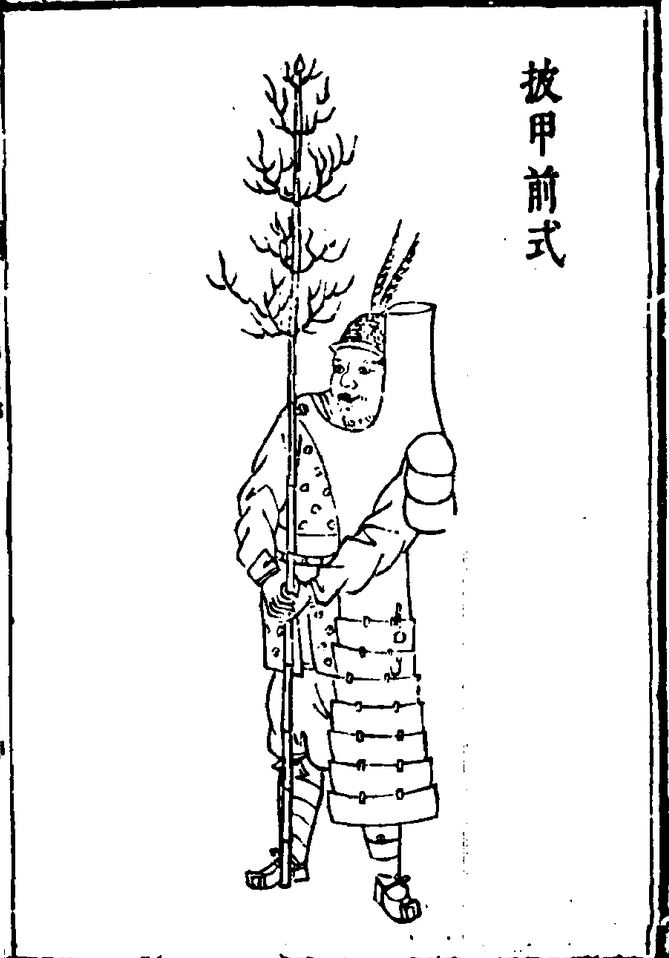
Soldier wearing leather armour only protecting the left side, holding a wolf brush (anti-polearm weapon), from the Wubei Yaolue

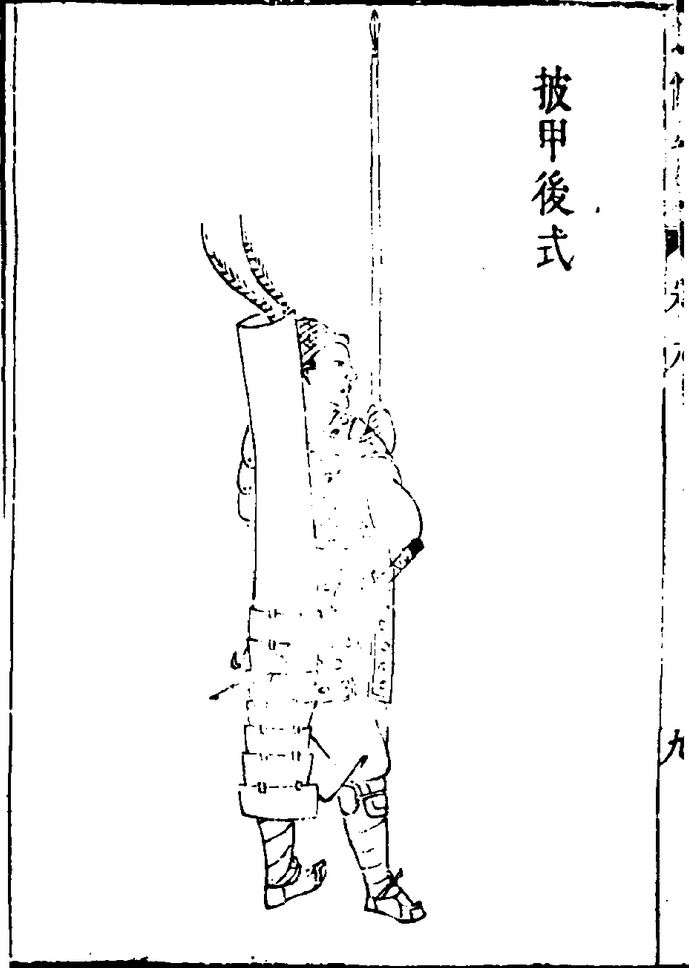
Leather armour, back

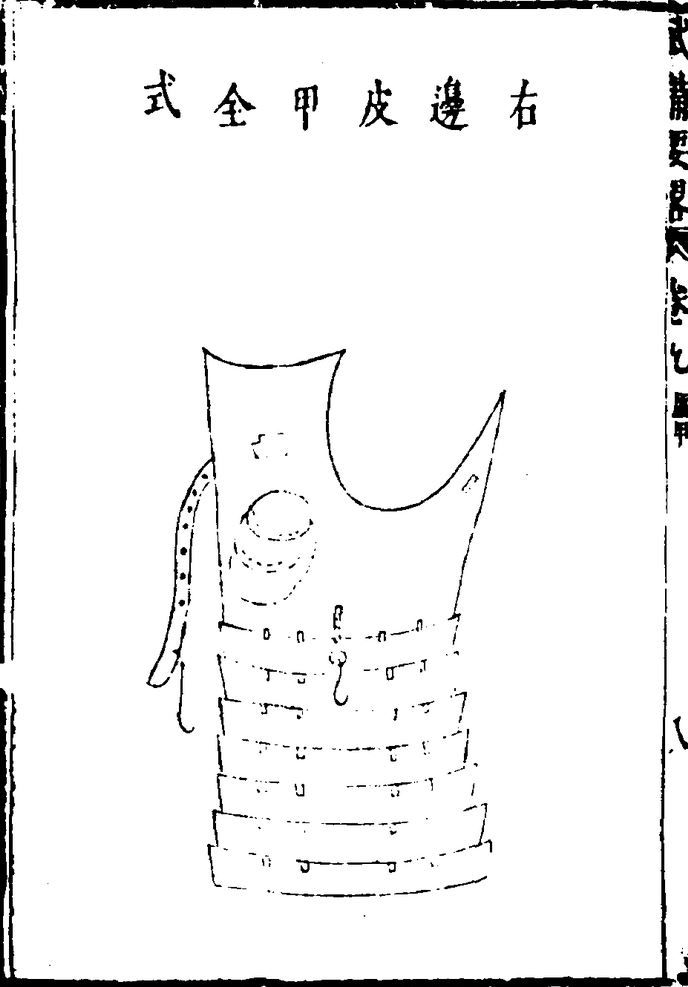
Leather armour, left side

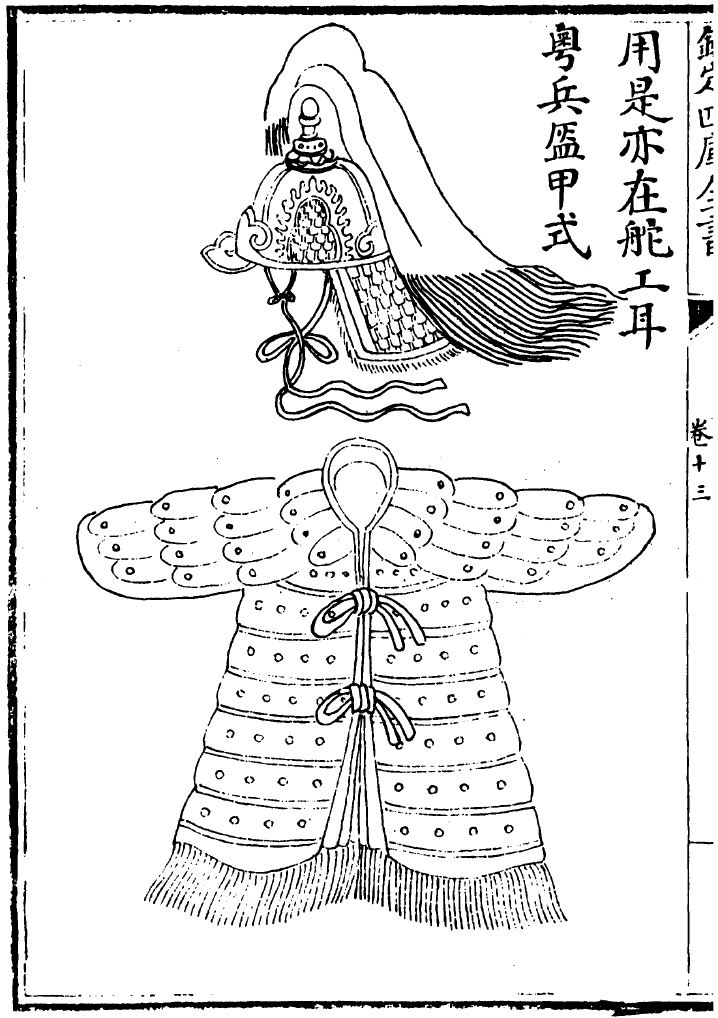
Horizontal leather armour used by sailors in southern China

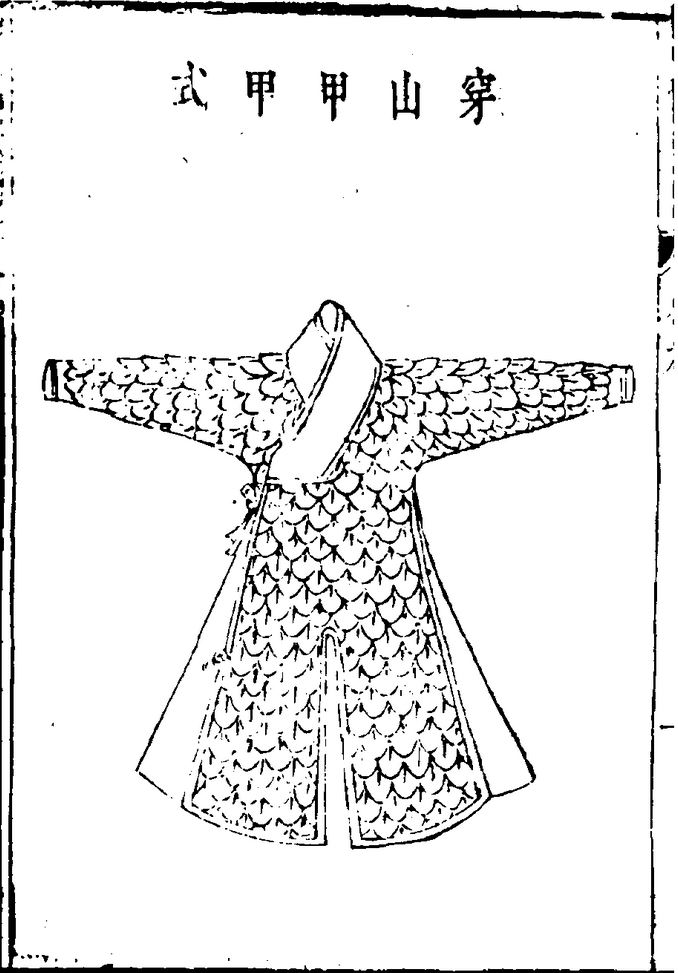
Pangolin armour

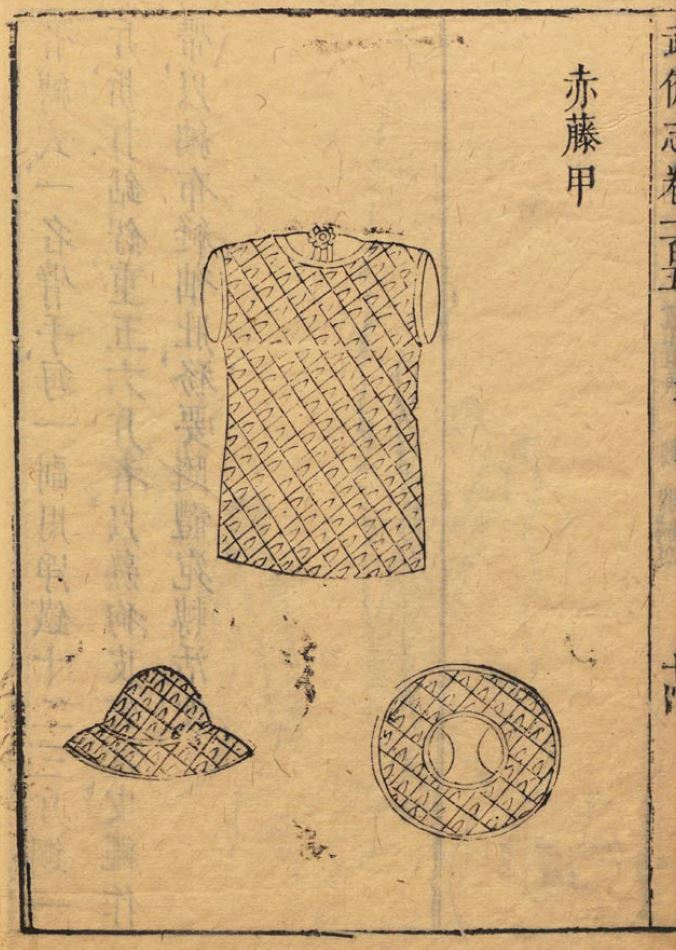
Rattan armour from the Wubei Zhi

=== Qing dynasty (1636–1912) ===
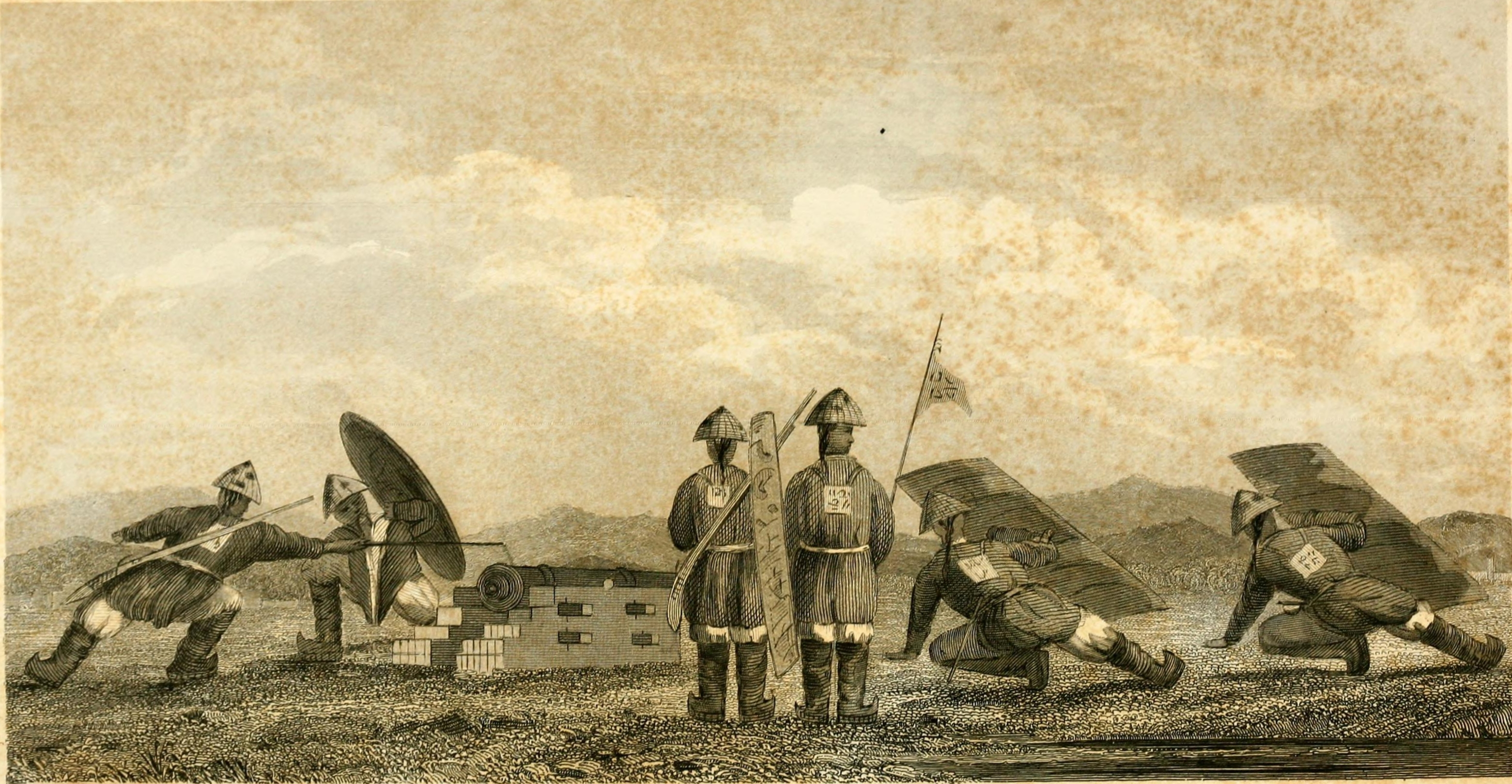
Qing soldiers with shields

In the 17th century the Qing army was equipped with both lamellar and brigandine armour. The quality of metal could differ greatly from a common soldier, whose armour could have only a thin soft sheet of metal, to an officer's brigandine, made of thin but tough and elastic steel. After the conquest of China and peace was established in the majority of the empire, many soldiers became lazy and refused to wear armour. In the 18th century, the Qianlong Emperor said, "Our old Manchu customs respect righteousness and revere justice. Young and old, none are ashamed to fight for them. But after enjoying such a long period of peace, inevitably, people want to avoid putting on armor and joining the ranks of war." As early as the 18th century, some brigandine armour had parts that were studded but did not actually include plates. By the 19th century most Qing armour were purely for show. Some uniforms and show pieces imitated brigandine armour by keeping the outer studs for aesthetic purposes but omitted the protective iron plates on the inside. According to one English source in the late 19th century, only the emperor's immediate body guard wore armour of any kind, and these guards were all nobles of the imperial family.

English literature in the early 19th century mentions Chinese rattan shields that were "almost musket proof", however another English source in the late 19th century states that they did nothing to protect their users during an advance on a Muslim stronghold, in which they were all invariably shot to death.

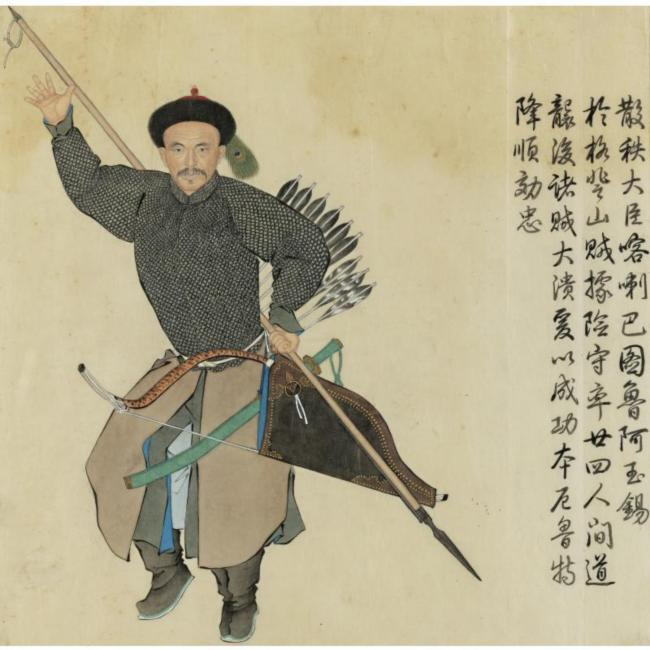
Ayusi, a Dzungar officer in the Qing army, in mail armour.

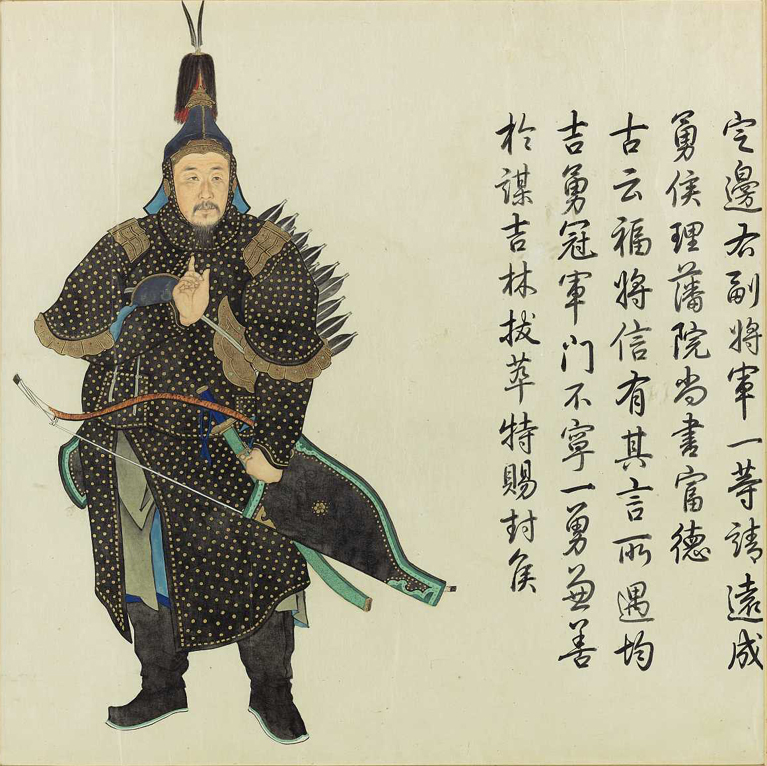
Fude (d. 1776), a Manchu officer of the Plain Yellow Banner, in brigandine armour.

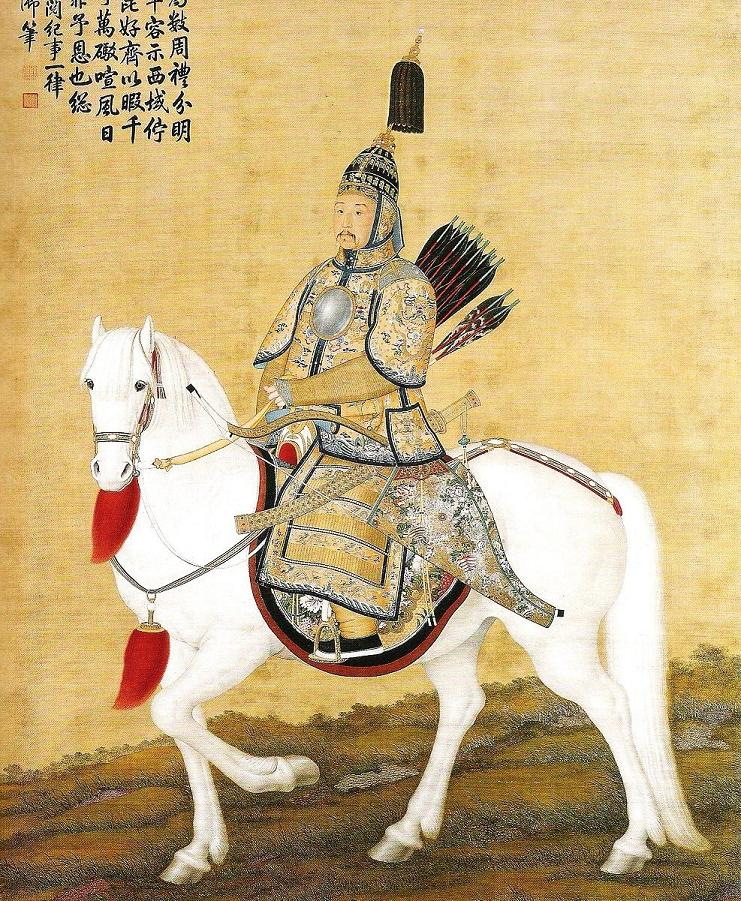
The Kangxi Emperor in ceremonial armour

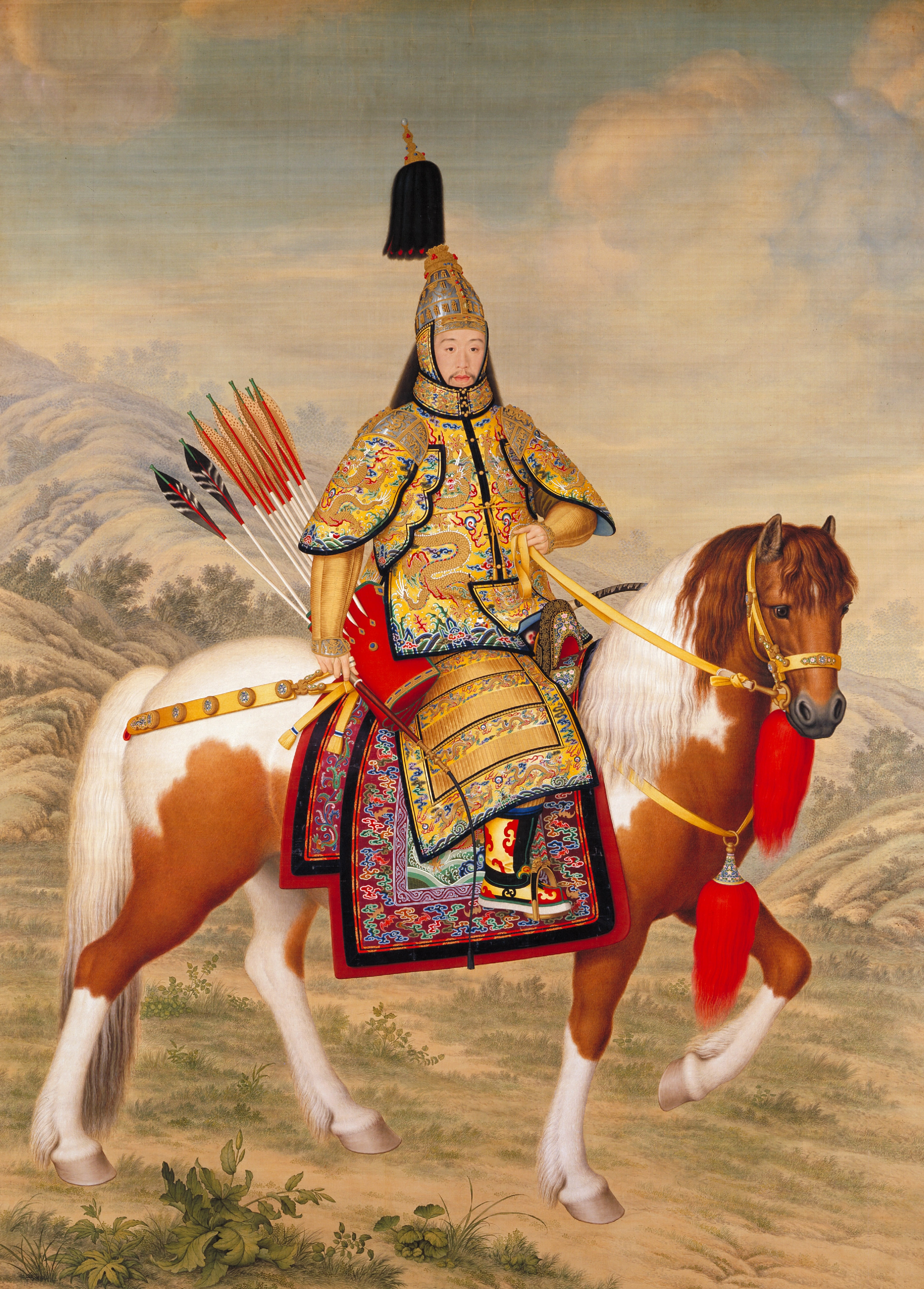
The Qianlong Emperor in ceremonial armour

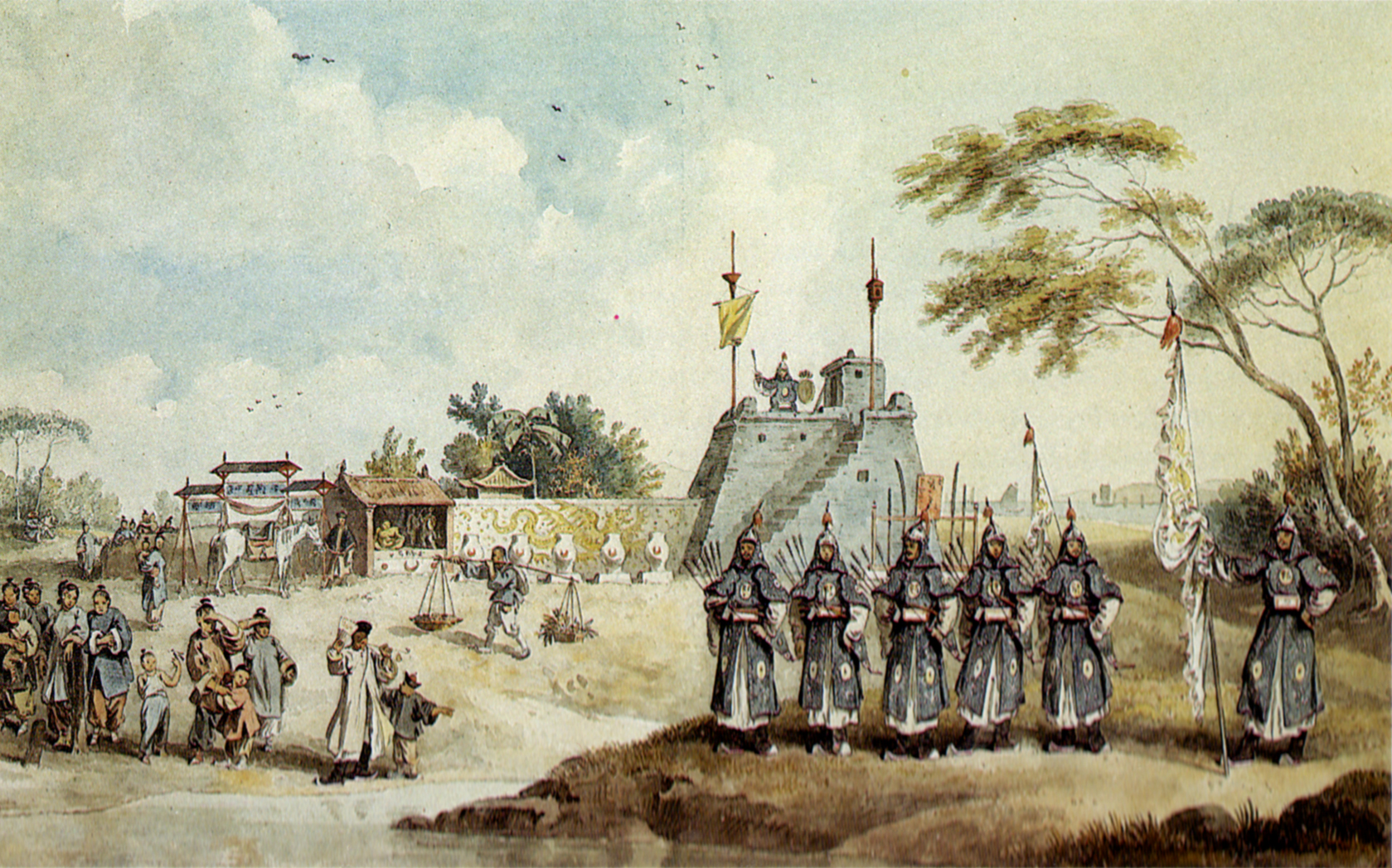
Qing soldiers 1793

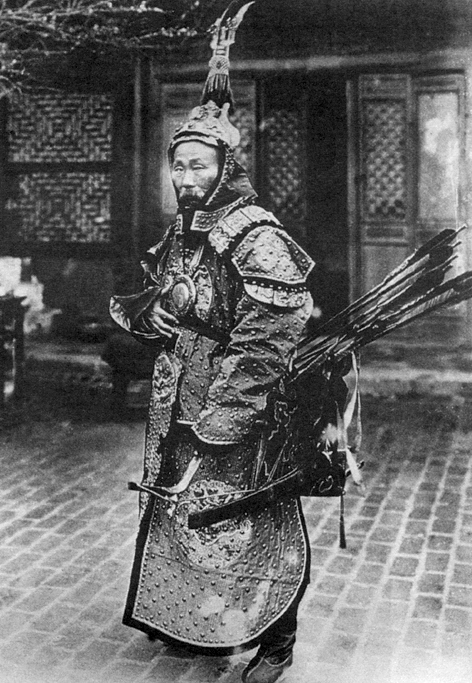
Su Yuanchun, who fought in the Sino-French War (1884–1885)

== See also ==
- Chinese swords
- Chinese polearms
- Japanese armour
- Korean armour
- Tibetan armor
- Indian armour
