= Stahlhelm =

Series of German steel combat helmets

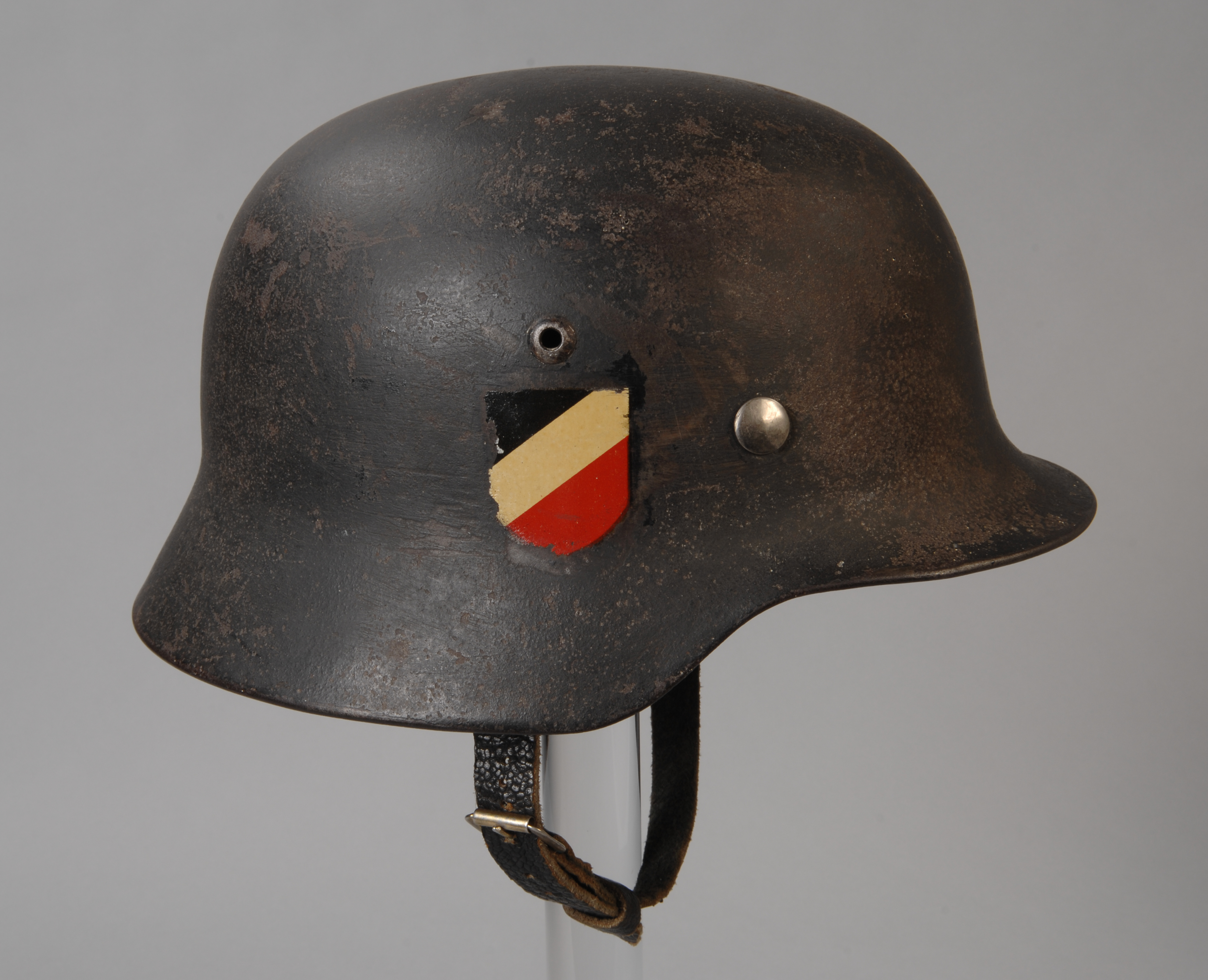
- M35 on display at Museum Rotterdam
- Type: Combat helmet
- Place of origin: Germany

Service history
- In service: 1916–1992 (May 1945 last Nazi use)
- Used by: See Users
- Wars: World War I German Revolution; Russian Civil War; Chinese Civil War; Spanish Civil War; Winter War; Continuation War; World War II; Korean War; Rhodesian Bush War; Vietnam War; Soviet-Afghan War; Georgian Civil War

Production history
- Designer: Dr. Friedrich Schwerd (M1916)
- Designed: 1915
- Produced: 1916
- Variants: See Variants

Stahlhelm (German for 'steel helmet') refers to a series of German steel combat helmet designs intended to protect the wearer from common battlefield hazards such as shrapnel.

The armies of the great powers began to issue steel helmets during World War I as a result of combat experience and experimentation. The Imperial German Army began to replace the boiled leather Pickelhaube with the Stahlhelm M16 in 1916. The Stahlhelm's distinctive coal scuttle shape was instantly recognizable and became a common element of propaganda on both sides, like the Pickelhaube before it. The name was used by Der Stahlhelm, a German veterans' organization that existed from 1918 to 1935.

After World War II, both East and West German militaries adopted helmets unrelated to the archetypical German helmet designs from the world wars, but continued to refer to the new models as Stahlhelm. The WWII-era Stahlhelm continued to be used by police and border guards in West Germany until the 1990s, when they were replaced by modern kevlar helmets.

== Historical context and origin ==
Before the Great War, most types of military headdress were not designed for protection. Most militaries had adopted either a cap or helmet, usually made of fabric or leather. Only some types of cavalry retained a metal helmet, albeit these were designed to protect against sabre blows rather than the causes of injury that would become prevalent in the war.

With the growing prevalence of artillery and the widespread adoption of trench warfare, the proportion of casualties on all sides suffering head injuries rose dramatically. Numerous units on both sides independently developed and locally produced their own ad hoc protective helmets starting in 1915. Stationed in the rocky area of the Vosges, Army Detachment Gaede recorded significantly more head injuries caused by stones and shell fragments than other units elsewhere. The artillery workshop of the Army Detachment developed a helmet that consisted of a cloth and leather skullcap with a steel plate (6 mm thickness). The plate protected not only the forehead but also the eyes and nose.

While the Germans were the first to initiate development of a modern combat helmet, they were plagued by red tape and inaction. The French were the first country to adopt and issue their Adrian helmet to units starting in 1915. The British Empire followed suit later that year with the Brodie helmet.

== Development ==
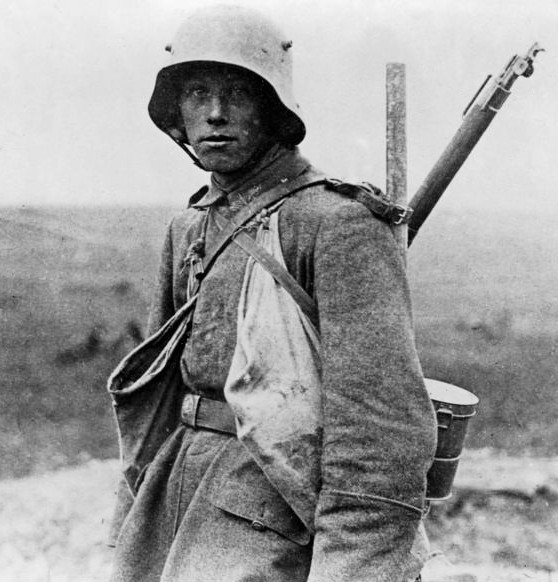
World War I German stormtrooper on the Western Front wearing the Stahlhelm

The design of the Stahlhelm was carried out by Dr Friedrich Schwerd of the Technical Institute of Hanover. In early 1915, Schwerd had carried out a study of head wounds suffered during trench warfare and submitted a recommendation for steel helmets, shortly after which he was ordered to Berlin. Schwerd then undertook the task of designing and producing a suitable helmet, broadly based on the 15th-century sallet, which provided good protection for the head and neck.

After lengthy development work, which included testing a selection of German and Allied headgear, the first stahlhelm were tested in November 1915 at the Kummersdorf Proving Ground and then field-tested by the 1st Assault Battalion. Thirty thousand examples were ordered, but it was not approved for general issue until the New Year of 1916; hence it is most usually referred to as the "Model 1916." In February 1916 it was distributed to troops at Verdun, following which the incidence of serious head injuries fell dramatically. The first German troops to use this helmet were the stormtroopers of the Sturm-Bataillon Nr. 5 (Rohr), commanded by Captain Willy Rohr.

In contrast to the Hadfield steel used in the British Brodie helmet, the Germans used a harder martensitic silicon/nickel steel. As a result, and also due to the helmet's form, the Stahlhelm had to be formed in heated dies at a greater unit cost than the British helmet, which could be formed in one piece.

Like the British and French, German troops identified highly with their helmets. The Stahlhelm became a popular symbol of paramilitary groups after the First World War. Such was the attachment of the World War One generation to the design that it was reportedly the reason that Hitler rejected a modernised, sloping helmet design to replace it.

== Stahlhelm use in other countries ==
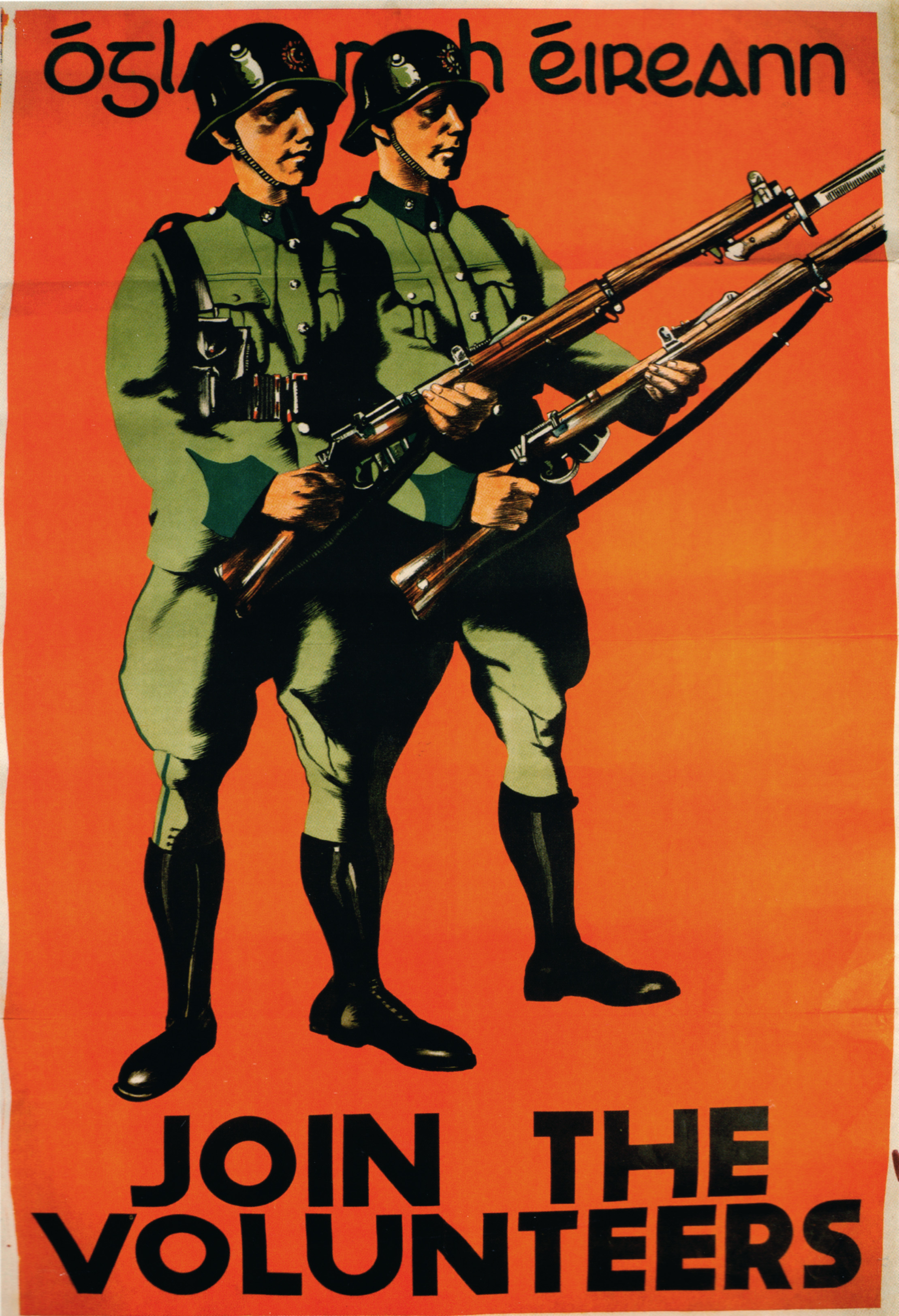
Irish Army soldiers in Stahlhelm-like helmets circa 1939

Germany exported versions of the M1935 helmet to various countries. Versions of the M1935 Stahlhelm were sent to Republic of China from 1935 to 1936 and the M1935 was the main helmet of the Chinese Nationalist Army (especially the "central" divisions) during World War II. Nationalist Rebels also received shipments during the Spanish Civil War. During the inter-war years, several military missions were sent to South America under the command of Hans Kundt. After the Chaco War, the Bolivian army adopted the Stahlhelm and continued using it until recently. The exported M1935 helmets were similar to the German issue, except for a different liner.

Some countries manufactured their own helmets using the M1935 design, and this basic design was in use in various nations as late as the 1970s.

The Germans helped the Hungarians copy the M1935 design. The WWII M38 Hungarian steel helmet is nearly identical to the German M1935. Both have almost the same shape, riveted ventilation holes, and the classic rolled edge. Differences include somewhat rougher Hungarian finishing, a different liner and different rivets position – the split pins are situated behind the ventilation holes. A square metal bracket is riveted on the rear, above the back brim, to secure the helmet to the knapsack while marching. It was typically painted in Hungarian brown-green, though blue-grey versions existed. It is sometimes called the "Finnish M35" due to its extensive use by the Finnish Army during the Continuation War 1941–1944.

After World War I Poland seized large quantities of M1918 helmets. Most were later sold to various countries, including Spain. However, at the end of the 1930s, it was discovered that the standard Polish wz. 31 helmet was unsuitable for tank troops and motorized units; while offering decent protection, it was too large and heavy. As a stop-gap measure before a new helmet was developed, the General Staff decided to issue M1918 helmets to the 10th Motorized Cavalry Brigade, which used them during the September Campaign.

During the time of the Warsaw Uprising the helmet was also worn by the members of the Polish Home Army and it was during this time that the helmet became the symbol of the resistance, as every Stahlhelm worn by a soldier of the underground army signified a dead German occupier it was taken from.

In November 1926, the Irish Defence Forces adopted the Stahlhelm. As the Treaty of Versailles barred Germany from exporting steel helmets, the Irish turned to London-based Vickers, ordering 5,000 copies of a model closely resembling the M1918 helmet. The helmet remained in use until it was replaced by the British Mark II model in 1940. Following the outbreak of World War II, the helmets became the subject of anti-Irish propaganda in Britain. A large number of the withdrawn helmets were reissued to various emergency services after being painted white.

Switzerland used a helmet, designated the M1918, that was roughly similar to the M1916 but had a shallower, wider and more rounded crown and skirt. This was to protect against the harsh winter winds of the alpine regions.

The Chilean Army was a prolific user of the Vulkanfiber models, bought before the Second World War, along with a few M1935 and Czechoslovak M32 helmets. After the war, local production of lightweight fiber and plastic models started, which are still in ceremonial and garrison use today. Small runs of steel helmets were made by FAMAE in the late 90s, either newly made or by reforming M1 Helmet shells, but ultimately were not adopted due to the ascendance of kevlar and synthetic ballistic fiber helmets by that time. A Stahlhelm with crossed bayonets and the corresponding number is the standard insignia of infantry regiments.

The Imperial Iranian Army used small numbers of the Vulkanfiber model, mostly with the Imperial Guard and a few units around Tehran, acquired prior to the Anglo-Soviet invasion of Iran.

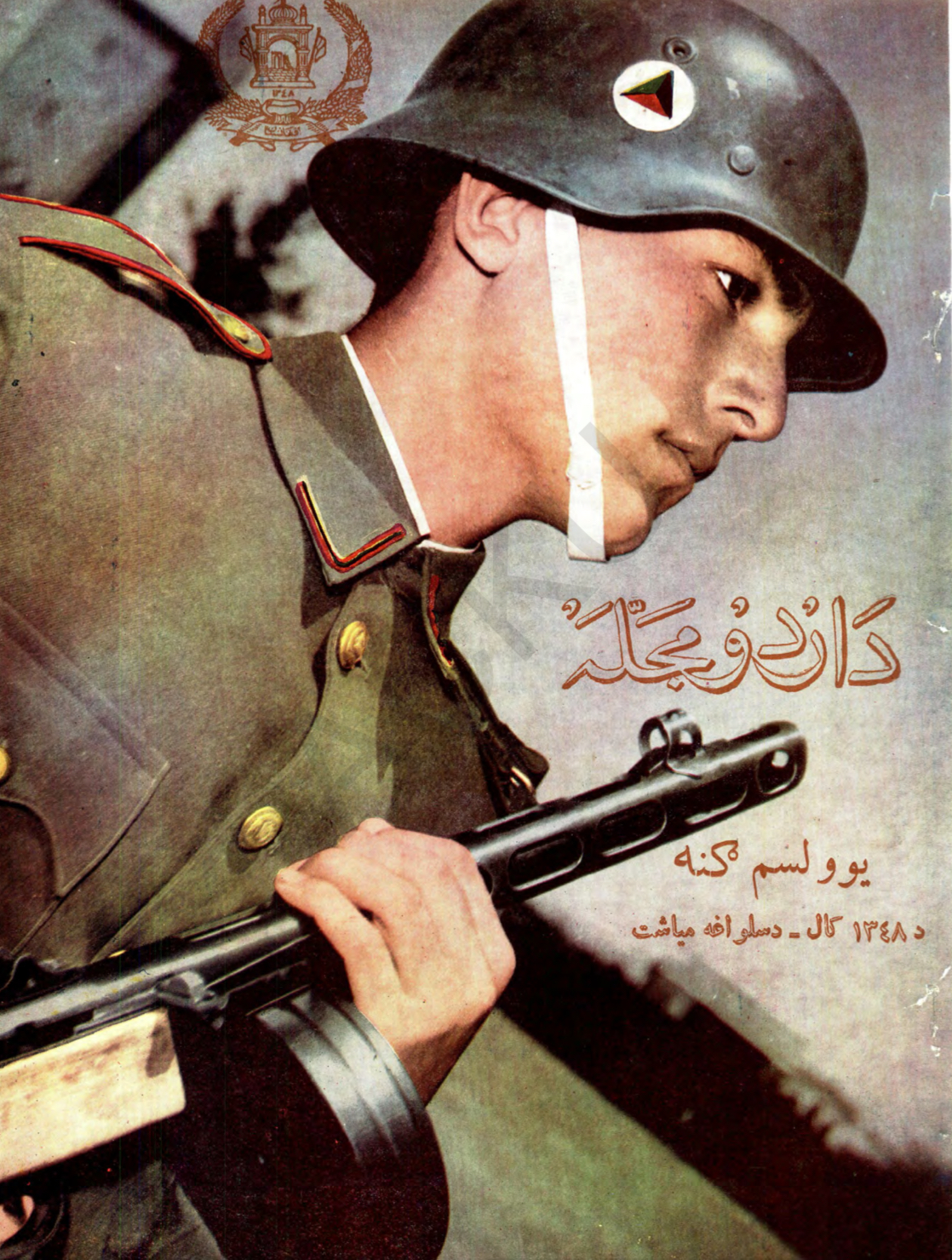
Royal Afghan Army soldier poses for the cover of a magazine in 1969.

During World War II, the Argentine Army adopted a similar model made of pressed fibre. For combat and provincial police use, imported Swiss M1918 Helmets were still in service as late as 1976.

In the Socialist Federal Republic of Yugoslavia, due to large quantities captured by World War II Partisans, the Stahlhelm was used in Yugoslav People's Army up to 1959, when it was phased out and replaced by the M59/85 steel helmet.

=== Postwar ===
In postwar Germany, surplus Stahlhelme were also repurposed for civilian use. Millions were scrapped for their raw materials, while others were converted into household objects such as kitchen strainers and ladles.

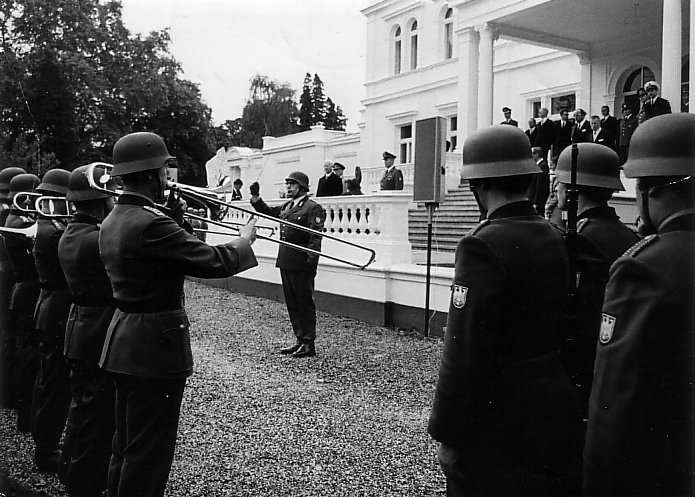
West German Bundesgrenzschutz band at Villa Hammerschmidt, in front of German Federal President Heinrich Lübke (1959–1969)

After World War II, West Germany's Bundesgrenzschutz border guards and some West German police units kept the Stahlhelm in their inventories (police units can be seen wearing them during footage of the Black September hostage crisis in 1972), and the Fallschirmjäger variant was used for some time by the GSG 9. With the re-armament of West Germany the Bundeswehr introduced the United States Army M1 Helmet which was replaced by a Kevlar helmet (Gefechtshelm), similar to the modern US helmets, in the 1990s. German firefighter units today still use Stahlhelm-shaped helmets in a fluorescent colour.

East Germany's National People's Army M-56 helmet was modelled on an unused 1942 German design with a more conical shape. The Chilean Army still uses the Stahlhelm design for ceremonial purposes, as does the Bolivian Army. There are also some biking helmets (with accompanying goggles) that resemble the Stahlhelm. Many schools and universities in Mexico such as the Autonomous University of Baja California have military bands that use or resemble the M35 Stahlhelm.

The U.S. Army's 1980s and 1990s era Kevlar Personnel Armor System for Ground Troops Helmet was sometimes called the "Fritz helmet" for its resemblance to the Stahlhelm. The U.S. Army and Marines have continued to use a design akin to the PASGT helmet with the MICH TC-2000 Combat Helmet and Lightweight Helmet, respectively.

The Chinese People's Liberation Army soldiers still used M1935 helmets which were captured from the Chinese Nationalist Army during the Chinese Civil War until the 1970s.

Since 2012, El Salvador's Policia Nacional Civil use a navy/indigo blue-coloured helmet that strongly resembles the Stahlhelm; this helmet is used by some members of the riot-control unit and rarely used by the Police's assault teams.

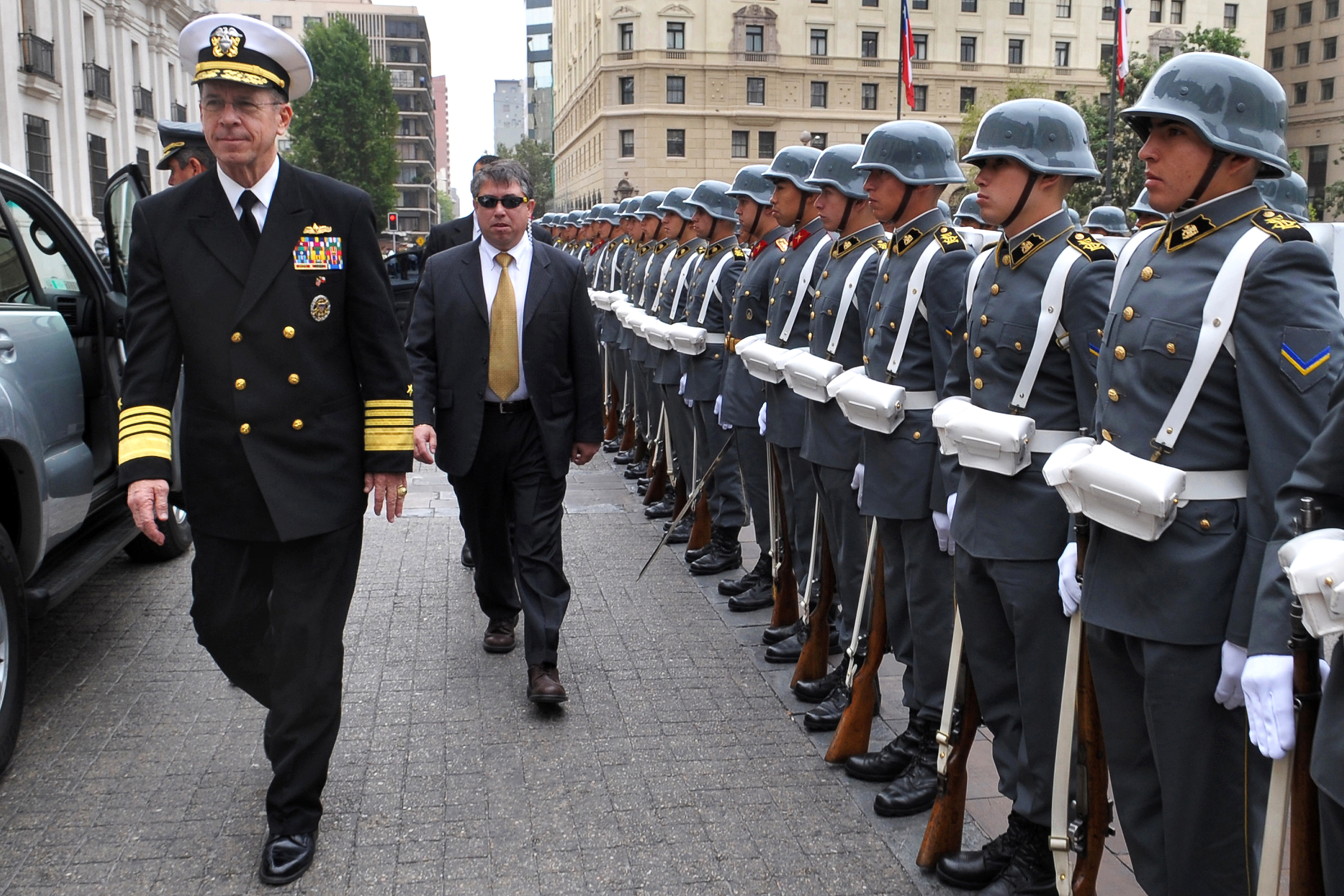
Chilean honour guard next to U.S. Admiral Michael G. Mullen in March 2009

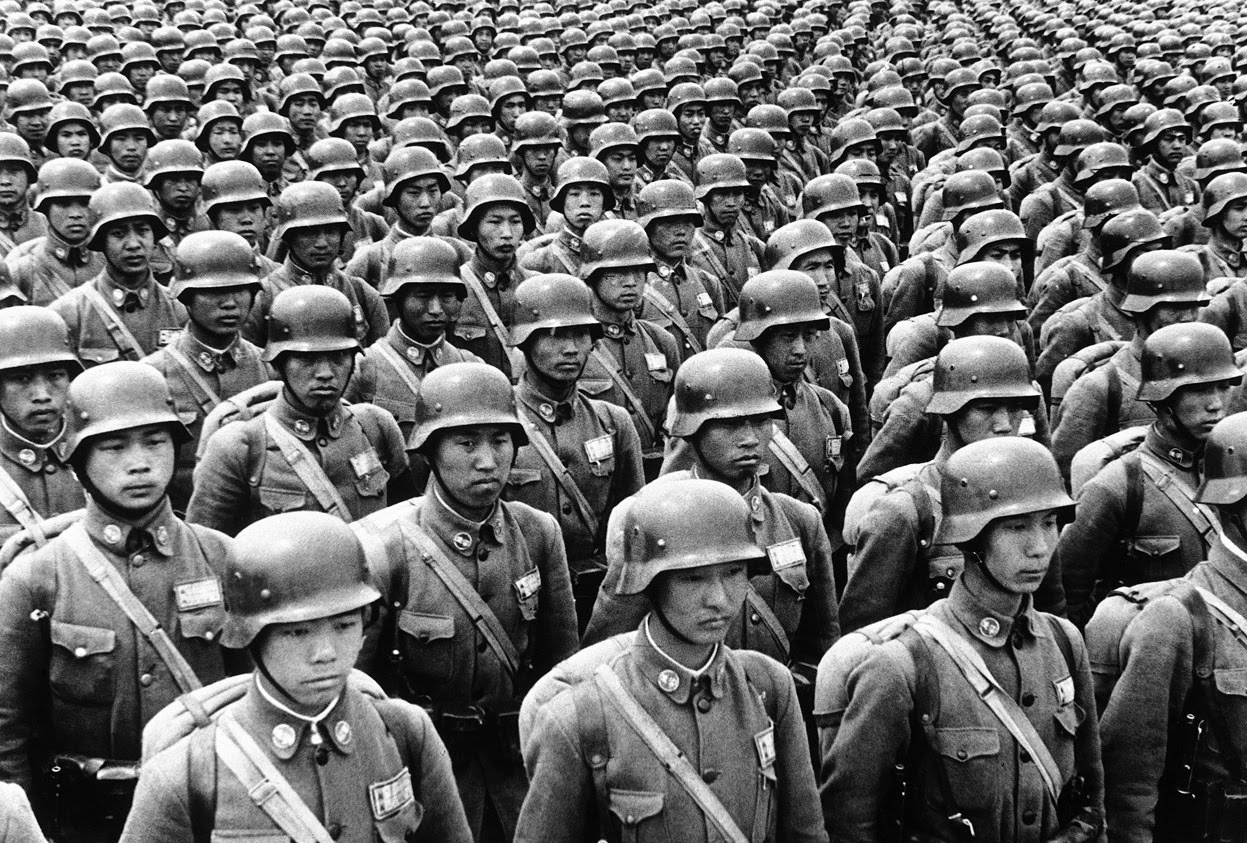
Chinese soldiers of the National Revolutionary Army wearing Stahlhelme before the battle of Wuhan

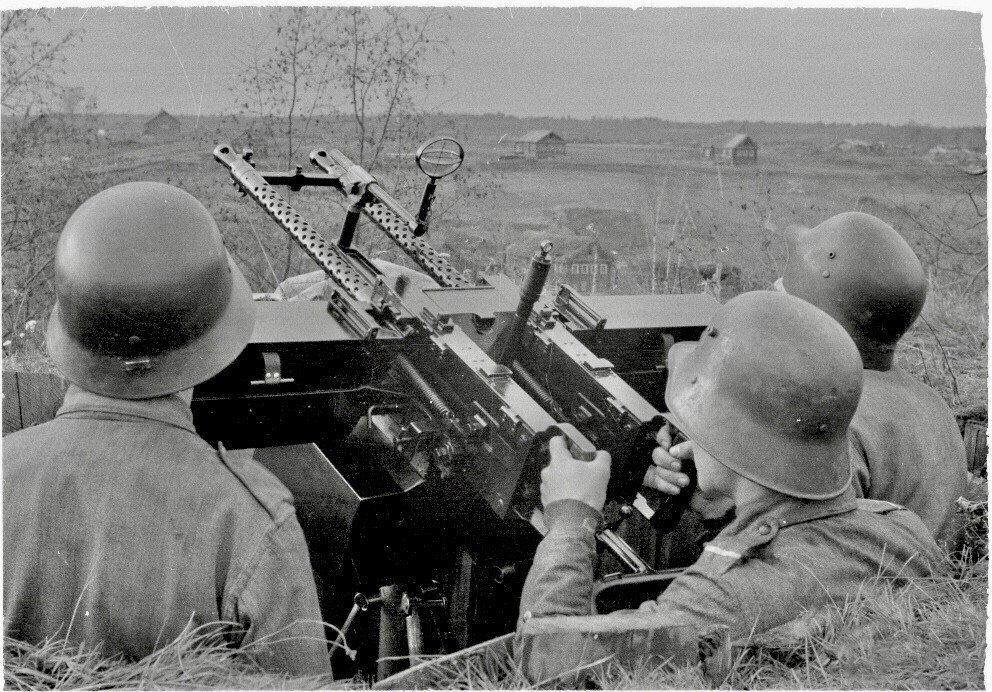
Finnish AA-MG crew in 1942. The soldier in the middle has an Austro-Hungarian M1917 and the others have Hungarian M38 helmets.

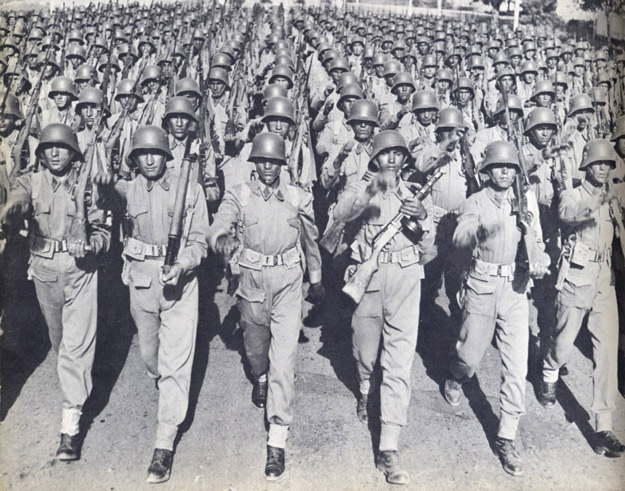
Afghan Army soldiers wearing Stahlhelm, 1950s

== Variants ==
The different Stahlhelm designs are named for their year of introduction. For example, the Modell 1942 which was introduced in 1942 is commonly known as M1942 or simply M42. Here, they are referred to by their M19XX names.

=== German WW1 variants ===
==== M1916 and M1917 ====
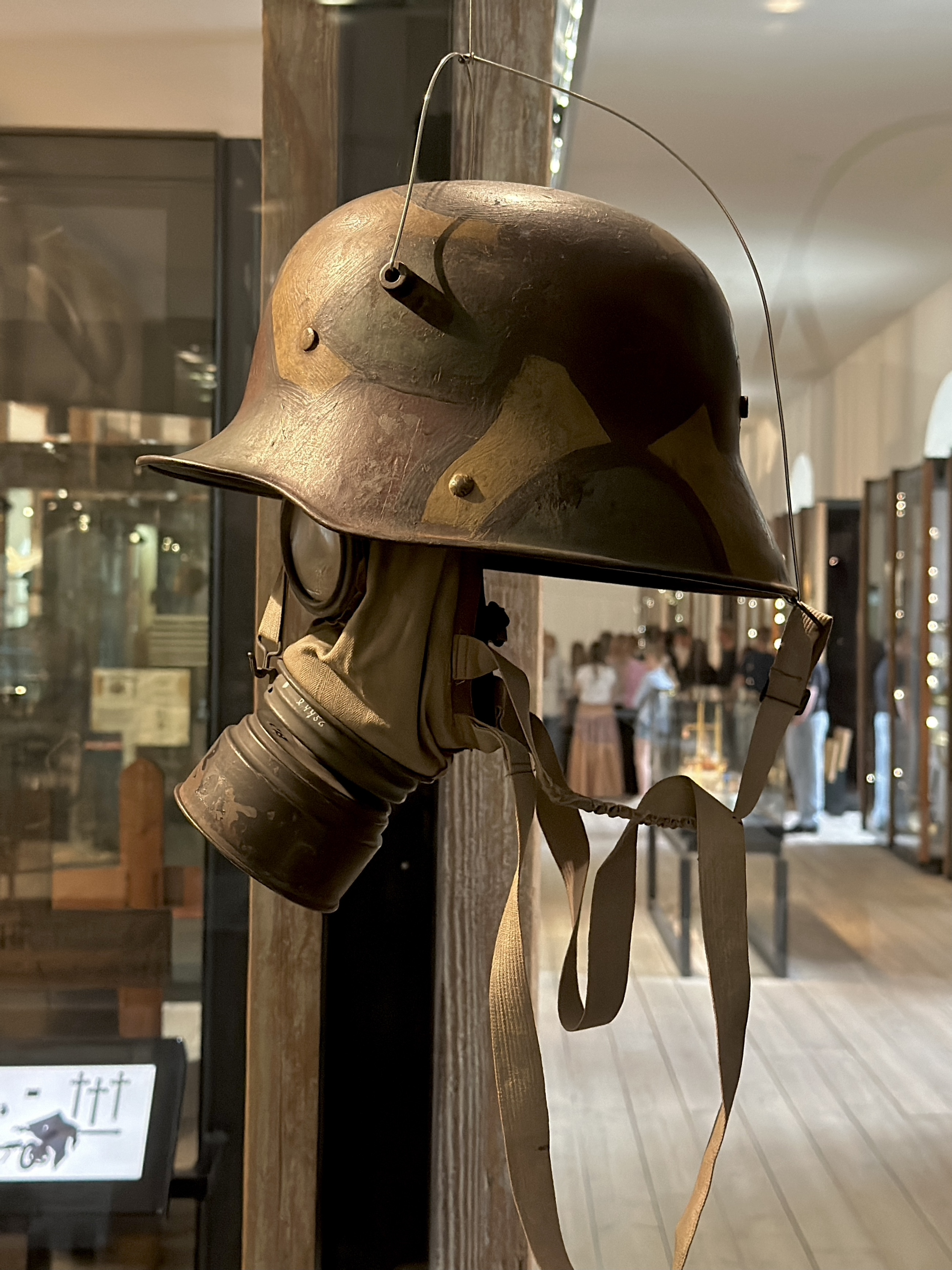
Stahlhelm M16 with a M15 gasmask and 1918 camouflage pattern

The Stahlhelm was introduced into regular service during the Verdun campaign in early 1916.

The M1916 design had side-mounted horn-like ventilator lugs which were intended to support an additional steel brow plate or Stirnpanzer, which saw limited use only by snipers and trench raiding parties, as it was too heavy for general use.

The shell came in different sizes, from 60 to 68, with some size 70s reported. Helmet weight varied from 0.98 kg to 1.4 kg, depending on shell size. The suspension, or liner, consisted of a headband with three segmented leather pouches, each holding padding materials, and leather or fabric cords that could be adjusted to provide a comfortable fit. The one-piece leather chin strap was attached to the shell by M1891 chinstrap lugs, the same kind used in the Pickelhaube helmet.

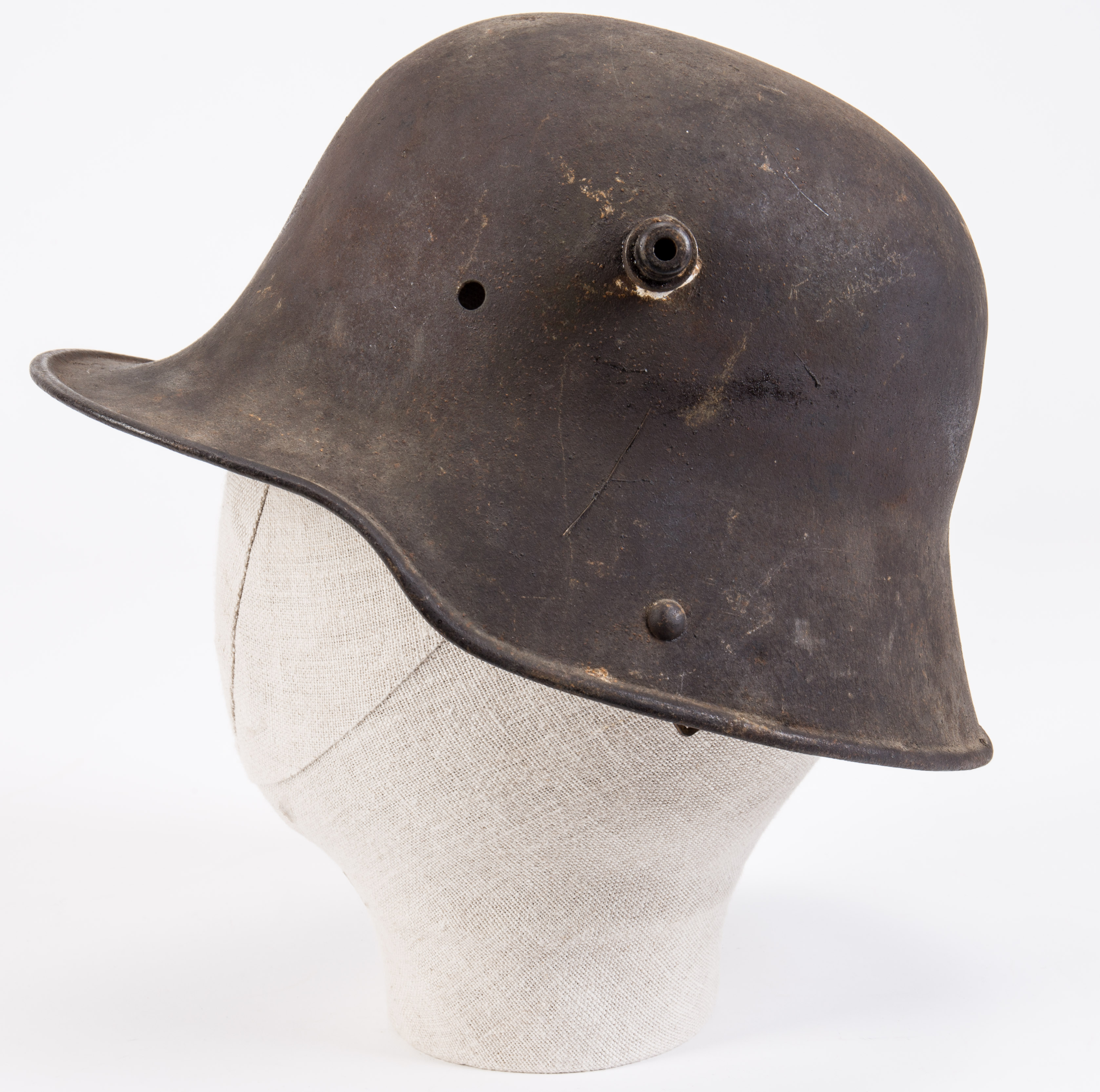
Stahlhelm M16 produced by Bell

The M1916 design provided excellent protection. Reserve Lieutenant Walter Schulze of 8th Company Reserve Infantry Regiment 76 described his combat introduction to the helmet on the Somme, 29 July 1916:

... suddenly, with a great clanging thud, I was hit on the forehead and knocked flying onto the floor of the trench... a shrapnel bullet had hit my helmet with great violence, without piercing it, but sufficiently hard to dent it. If I had, as had been usual up until a few days previously, been wearing a cap, then the Regiment would have had one more man killed.

But the helmet had a few flaws. The ventilator horns often let cold air in during the winter, requiring the wearer to block the vents with mud or fabric. The large, flared skirt tended to make it difficult for soldiers to hear, distorting surrounding sounds and creating an echo when the wearer spoke. Stahlhelms weren't reliable to deflect or absorb the impact of a live round.

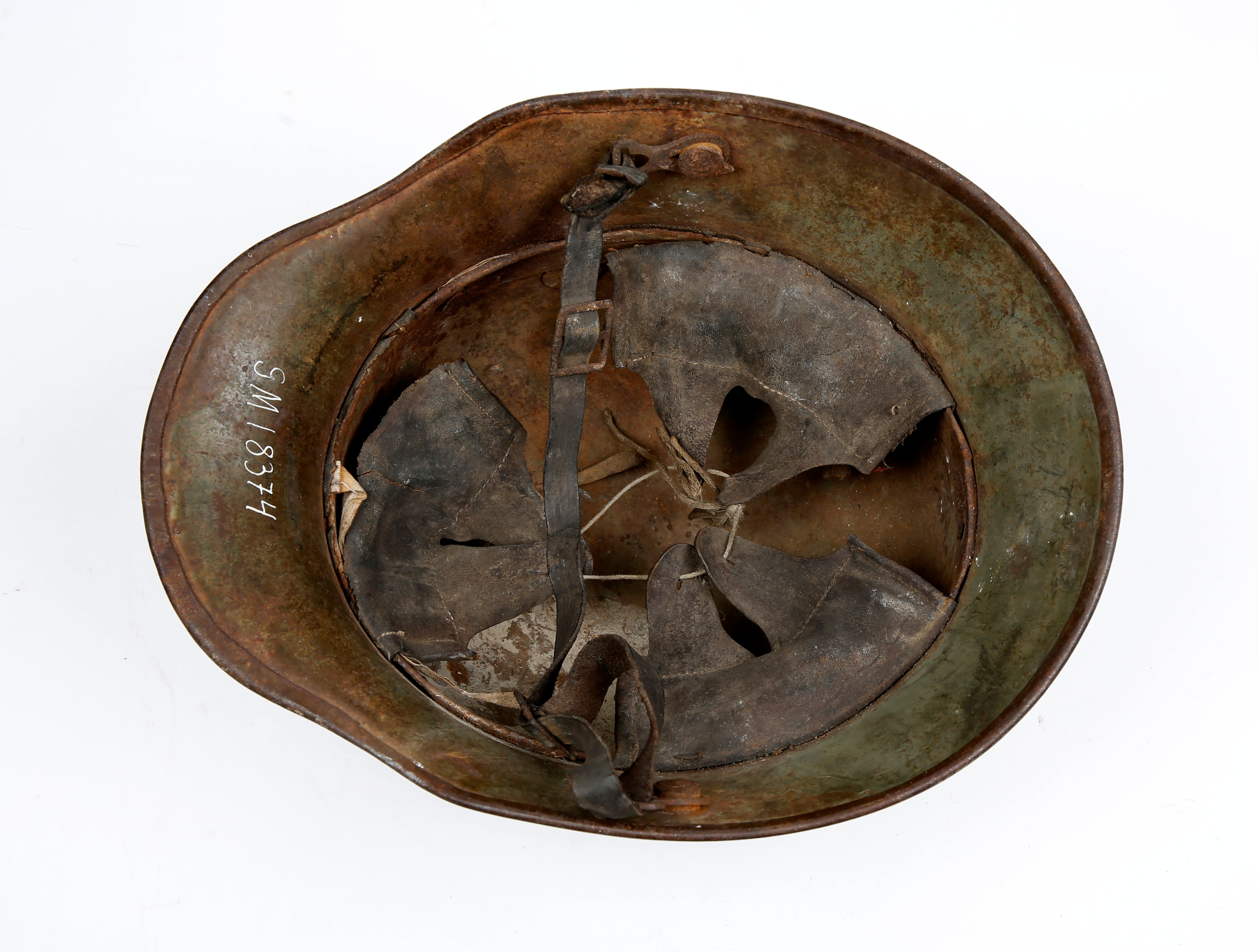
The interior of a M17 stahlhelm

Originally painted Feldgrau (field grey), the Stahlhelm was often camouflaged by troops in the field using mud, foliage, cloth covers, and paint. Official issue cloth covers in white and grey appeared in late 1916 and early 1917. Camouflage paint was not formally introduced until July 1918, when German Army Order II, No 91 366, signed by General Erich Ludendorff on 7 July 1918, outlined official standards for helmet camouflage. The order stipulated that helmets should be painted in several colours, separated by a finger-wide black line. The colours should be relevant to the season, such as using green, brown and ochre in summer. In the closing months, some experiments were conducted on the Stahlhelm paint. Wollstaub was one such paint iteration that was infused with crushed felt in hopes of glare reduction.

After the effectiveness of the M1916 design was validated during the 1916 campaigns, incremental improvements were subsequently made. The M1917 version saw improvements to the liner but was otherwise identical to the original design.

==== M1918 ====
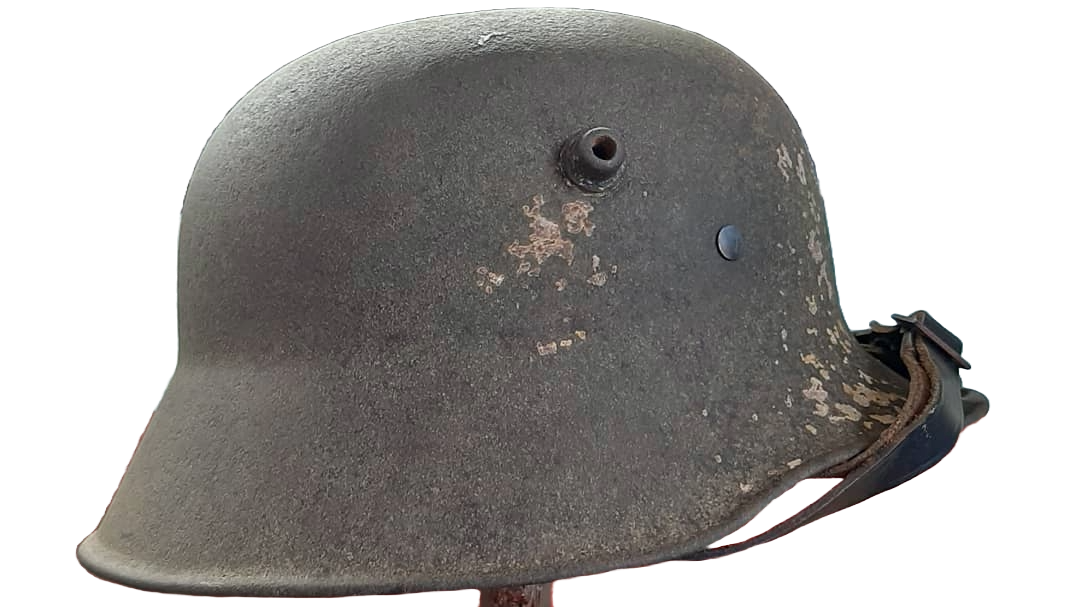
Stahlhelm M18

Introduced on 12 February 1918, extensive redesigns were made for the M1918 model. A new two-piece chin strap was introduced and was attached directly to the helmet liner rather than the shell. The M1918 Stahlhelm can be distinguished from the M1916, as the M1918 shell lacks the chinstrap rivet on the lower side of the helmet skirt found on earlier models.

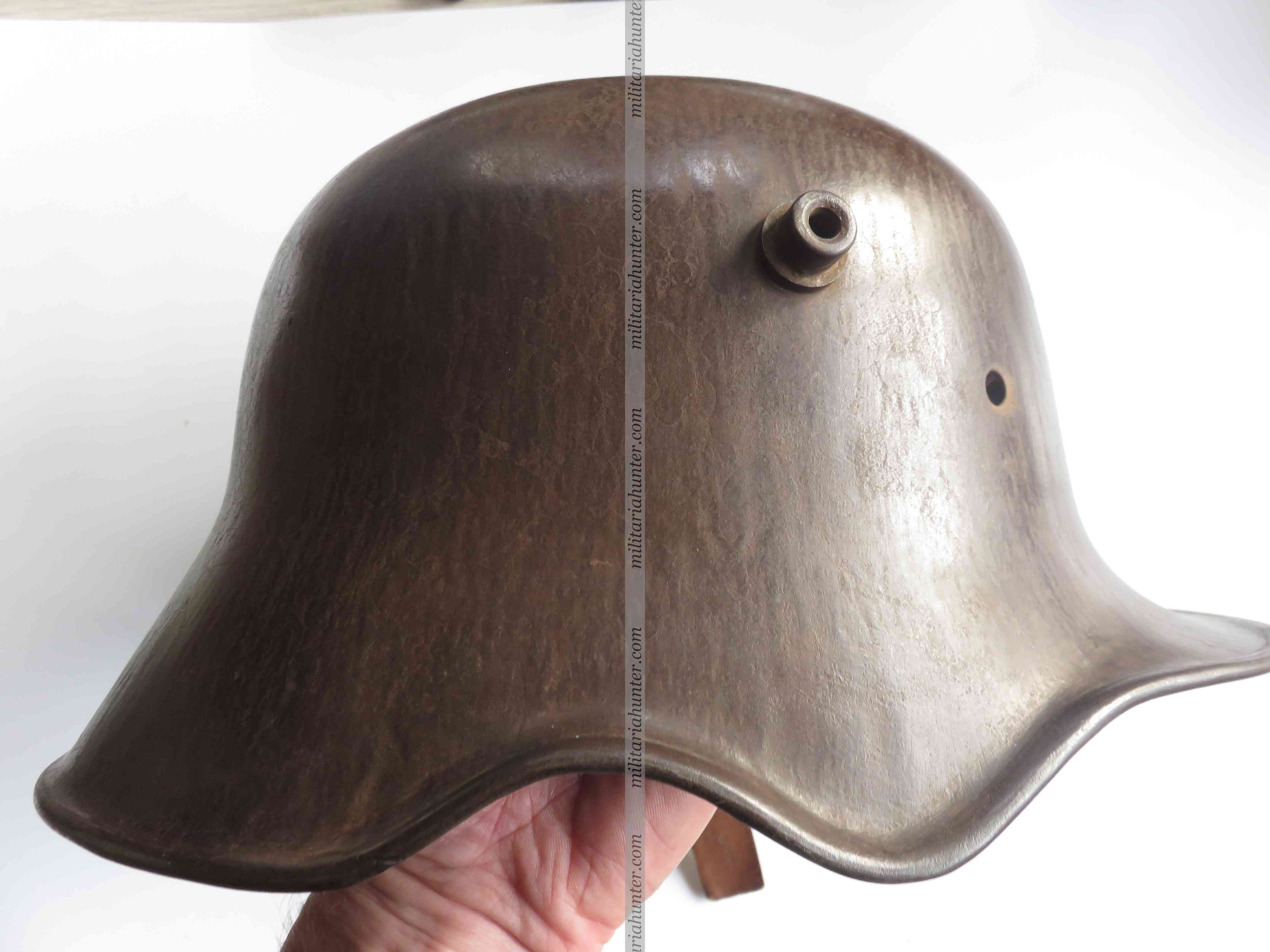
Stahlhelm M18 cut out

Certain examples of the M1918 had cutouts in the rim along the sides of the helmet. It has incorrectly been said that these cutouts were to accommodate headphones while wearing the helmet or that the helmet were specifically made for the cavalry, so this iteration was once dubbed the telephone talker helmet or cavalry helmet, despite the fact that it was intended to be utilized by all units; today they are known to collectors just as "cut-out M18s". These cutouts were actually done to improve hearing and to reduce echo created by the large, flared skirt. About 100.000 were created in the closing months of the war.

==== Full-visor prototype ====
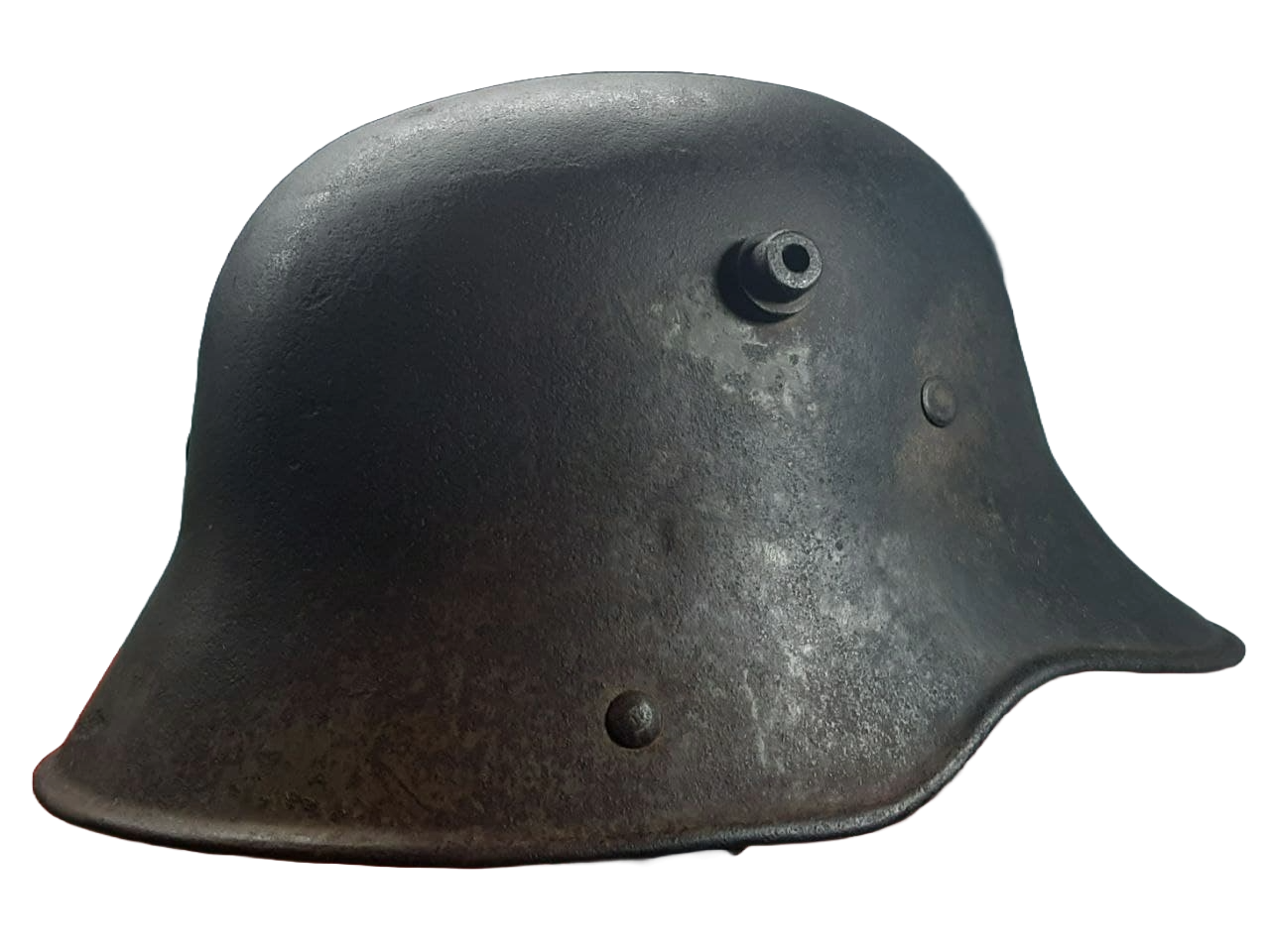
Full-visor helmet, in the M16 configuration

The full-visor helmet [also called the sloping-brow helmet] was a rare experimental variant of the Stahlhelm documented in both M16 and M18 configurations. It is characterized by a continuous, gently curved, forward-extended brow—typically cited in literature as approximately 3 cm longer than standard production models—intended to offer a more sloping frontal profile or to enhance compatibility with contemporary gas masks. Traditional historiography, including works by Ludwig Baer and Paolo Marzetti, has generally treated the model as a limited late-war trial variant from 1918, citing a somewhat heavier shell, a deeper profile, and simplified interior fittings [such as a steel sweatband]. This late-war timeline is further supported by historical documentation from Bashford Dean regarding similar non-standard specimens captured by American forces at St. Mihiel in late 1918.

However, the precise chronological placement, production provenance, and authenticity of the variant remain subjects of significant debate within contemporary research and advanced collecting circles:

- Early-war development hypothesis: alternative interpretations of period photographic evidence - specifically an archived image of German troops deployed on Côte 304 during the Verdun Campaign [spring of 1916] - have led some researchers to suggest that the design may have originated as an early developmental prototype rather than a late-war experiment;
- Localized field modifications: curatorial feedback from regional military institutions, indicates that the variant was never mass-produced by national factories. Instead, it has been hypothesized that the surviving specimens could represent non-standard, localized field or regimental workshop adaptations, which would account for the subtle structural variances observed in the brim profiles of the few extant unmarked examples;
- Historiographical skepticism: a prominent counter-theory within advanced militaria research cautions that the "full-visor" might exist, in part, as a high-end fantasy item. Some experts claim that highly skilled European counterfeiters successfully converted genuine, rusted relic shells into deceptive experimental configurations [including Turkish variants and sloped brows] using fresh stampings and replica parts, subsequently introducing these pieces into prominent private collections over recent decades.

The hypothesis of a wartime Austro-Hungarian deployment has been significantly bolstered by critical analysis of the famous, heavily scrutinized period portrait of a Kaiserjäger officer wearing the sloping-brow configuration. While previously dismissed in certain specialized circles as a potential modern digital forgery or an anonymous fantasy print, bibliographic tracking has confirmed that the portrait was originally published directly within the historical volume "Tiroler Kaiserjäger im Weltkrieg", authored by the very subject depicted, the k.u.k. Officer Guido Jakoncig. Although contemporary critics argue that the distinct lines of the visor could represent an exaggerated, manual touch-up executed by a wartime print editor, the verifiable period publication of the volume provides objective proof that the underlying image is a genuine, wartime artifact rather than a post-war hoax. Furthermore, the physical appearance, visible thickness, and weight distribution of the shell depicted strongly support its nature as a combat-weight steel helmet rather than a lightweight ceremonial parade piece. Consequently, the proven authenticity of this contemporary print serves as primary evidence corroborating the physical existence and combat field availability of the full-visor configuration during the conflict.

Because firm factory documentation and official ordnance board files remain scarce, the full-visor configuration continues to be evaluated with extreme caution, balancing its recorded presence in early literature against modern technical critiques of advanced falsification and localized regimental manufacturing.

==== Ottoman full-visor M1916 and M1918 ====
The introduction of steel helmets to the Ottoman Turkish forces occurred during the Great War, with the first documented evidence appearing in a photograph of the XV Army Corps in Galicia (10 July 1916), where troops are depicted wearing unmodified German M16 Stahlhelme. Subsequent developments led to two distinct patterns: a modified version of the M16 and a specific contract for the M18. The modified M16, converted in 1917, featured a machine-cut rim reduced by approximately 1 cm, with a significant portion of the peak removed. These helmets are primarily associated with the Yildrim Army Group (Thunderbolt Army Group), an elite formation organized by Enver Pasha in early 1917. While some sources suggest that up to 170,000 altered helmets were provided, more conservative estimates focus on the equipment of the Yildrim infantry during the Battle of Megiddo (1918). The rationale for these modifications includes:

- Acoustic and safety considerations: it was incorrectly believed that the deep skirt of the standard M16 caused blast injuries to the ears, and its removal was intended to improve hearing and all-round vision
- Weight and climate adaptation: reducing the skirt and peak lowered the weight from the original 1 kilogram (2.2 pounds) to facilitate use in hot climates and improve air circulation
- Traditional and aesthetic identity: the Ottoman government sought a distinctive silhouette that echoed the ridged sun helmet (kabalak—or enveriye—and bashlyk) commonly worn by officers and NCOs. This was likely a strategic attempt by the Sublime Porte to maintain a unique national identity and avoid the appearance of being a mere satellite state of the German Empire, while also ensuring that the equipment of the Imperial Army and the Imperial Navy remained distinctive—a requirement that persisted even during the First World War.

The second type was a specific M18 contract produced by Eisenhüttenwerk Thale (ET). This model featured a rim that continued unbroken around the shell, omitting the typical angles between the brim and the sides. Chris Flaherty's research, utilizing material from the Turkish Military Museum, confirms that 5,400 of these helmets were delivered before the contract was terminated following the Armistice of Mudros (31 October 1918). These units were consistently size 66, finished in factory dark grey-green paint, and fitted with German Model 1918 liners featuring white pads and carbine-clip chinstrap attachments. Collectors often use the term "full-visor" to describe this contract, though it was not an official designation used by Eisenhüttenwerk Thale or the Ottoman military. It should not be confused with another rare variant also known as the "full-visor" or "sloping brow" helmet—described in the paragraph above. Furthermore, researchers warn of contemporary fakes produced from modified Czechoslovak M20 shells.

==== Visorless M1918 ====
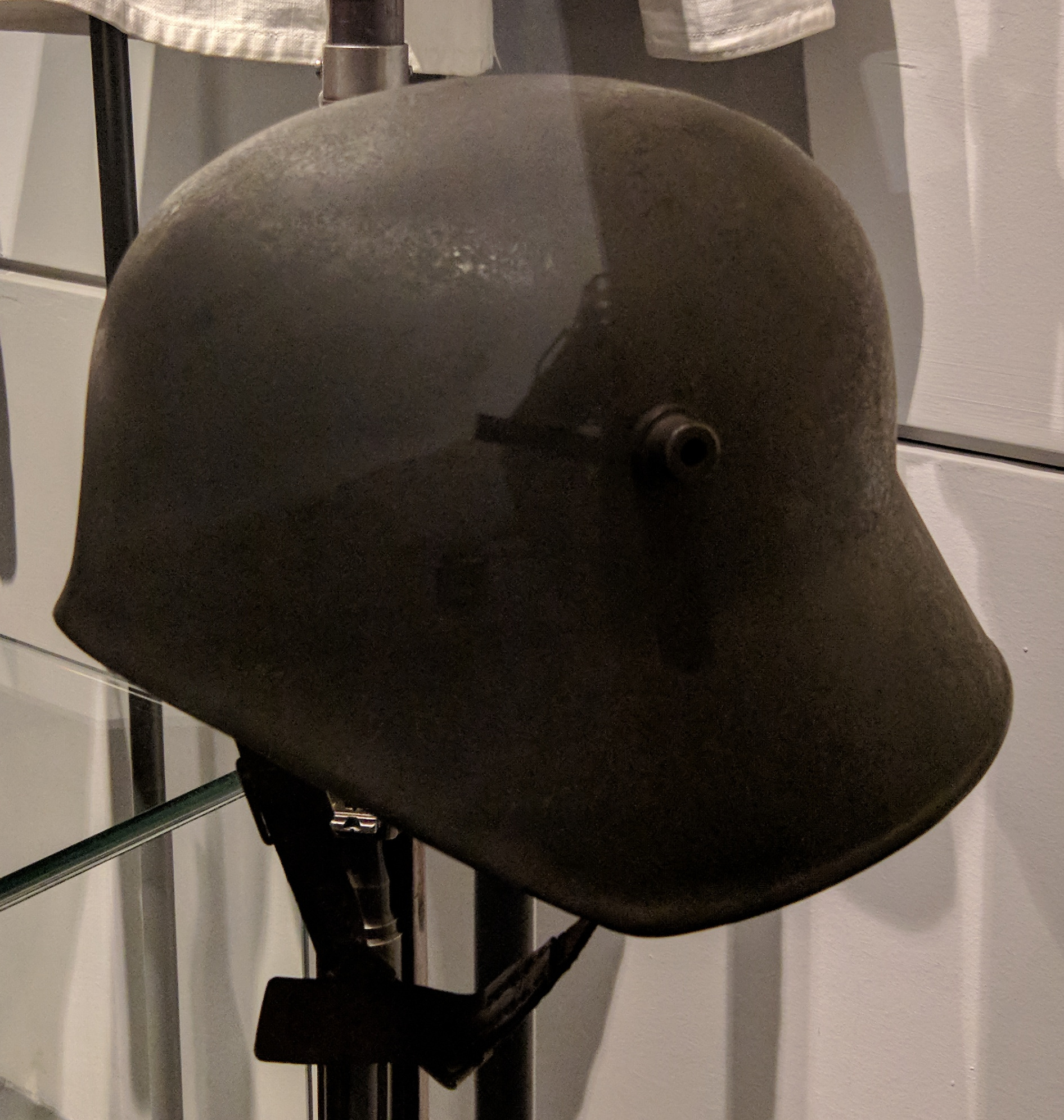
The M1918 visorless/peakless stahlhelm

The so-called "visorless" M1918 is a distinct variant that originated from a completely separate German military project and has frequently been the subject of historiographical confusion. Contrary to earlier collector theories, research by Flaherty demonstrates that this pattern was produced for the Imperial German Army rather than Ottoman forces. A persistent but discredited explanation suggested that the lack of a visor allowed Muslim soldiers to perform the prostration during prayer. However, this is physically impossible while wearing the helmet, and Islamic law [specifically the Ṣalāt al-Khawf or "prayer of fear"] allowed for modified rituals during combat, rendering such a design modification unnecessary for religious purposes.

The "visorless" model was notably utilized by Freikorps personnel in the post-war period (1919/20), and its common association with armored vehicle crews – leading to the "Tanker" moniker – is likely derived from period photographs of Freikorps units operating tanks.

The primary source of confusion regarding this helmet can be traced to Floyd R. Tubbs' work Stahlhelm (1971), which incorrectly identified the visorless variant as the "Turkey steel helmet" and erroneously attributed the delivery figure of 5,400 to this model. Tubbs further inaccurately linked the design to the 1832 decree of Sultan Mahmud II regarding the fez. Modern research confirms that the 5,400 figure belongs exclusively to the Ottoman "full-visor" M18 contract. The Imperial War Museum characterizes the visorless variant as "peakless" in its catalogue, noting its use by German forces rather than Turkish troops.

=== Austro-Hungarian WW1 variants ===
==== Development and production ====
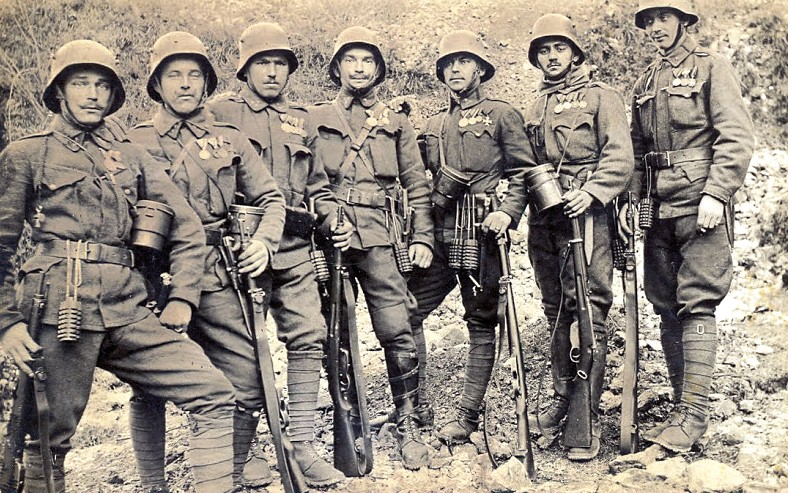
Austro-Hungarian soldiers at the Isonzo front with Stahlhelme

Austro-Hungarian interest in specialized head protection emerged concretely only in 1916, primarily driven by industrial initiatives and battlefield reports, making it the last of the major European powers to develop and produce a steel head protection. Initial experimentation was conducted by Gebrüder Böhler & Co. A.G., which in February 1916 proposed a variety of steel alloys and prototypes, including twenty-two distinct designs ranging from French-style models to dragoon-type and visor-style headpieces. Ballistic trials demonstrated that only heavy variants exceeding 4.5 mm in thickness could withstand direct rifle fire, while lighter models were effective only against shrapnel. Concurrently, captured Italian Farina helmets were tested, though they proved cumbersome and ballistically insufficient for widespread use.

Faced with a critical shortage of nickel and chromium, the Austro-Hungarian Kriegsministerium (KM) initially explored emergency solutions, such as the Stahlhauben (steel skullcaps) designed by Carl Lepold Hollitzer to be fitted over existing leather or tin dragoon helmets. However, persistent requests from frontline units—notably the Tyrolean mountain defense—emphasized the urgent need for a dedicated combat helmet to mitigate injuries from grenade fragments and rock splinters. In mid-1916, interest shifted toward the German Stahlhelm pattern. Despite early attempts by Phönix-Bleckmann (JEB prototypes) and Böhler to develop domestic designs, the technical superiority and standardization of the German model led to its official adoption for national production to avoid further delays.

The manufacturing process was a complex industrial cycle involving several specialized facilities. Steel production was decentralized across various Stahlwerke:

- Gebrüder Böhler & Co. A.G.: Kapfenberg, present day Austria (identifying stamp: B)
- Eisenwerke Brüder Lapp: Rottenmann, present day Austria (identifying stamp: L)
- Poldihütte A.G.: Kladen/Kladno, Bohemia, present day Czech Republic (identifying stamp: P)
- Phönixstahlwerke (Johann Eugen Bleckmann): Mürzzuschlag, presenr day Austria (identifying stamps: B, P, or a stylized phoenix often resembling a triangular A)
- Manfred Weiss, Munitions, Stahl- und Metallwerke A.G.: Tschepele/Csepel, present day Hungary (identifying stamp: numerical series)
- Nadráger Eisenindustrie-Gesellschaft: Steinacker/Nadrág, present day Romania (no identified symbols found)
- Resicza-ku. Eisen- u. Stahlwerke: Reschitz/Resicza, present day Romania (identifying stamp: distorted R resembling a B, or a simple R)
- M. Hainisch: Vienna, present day Austria (identifying stamp: H)

The production network was further characterized by specialized industrial relationships and stringent quality control measures. It is highly probable that the Nadráger Eisenindustrie-Gesellschaft worked exclusively for Manfred Weiss, focusing its output on supplying the necessary steel for the Csepel facility. Meanwhile, other contributors faced technical challenges; for instance, a significant volume of steel sheets manufactured by M. Hainisch was ultimately rejected for failing to meet the required ballistic and structural standards.

The industrial cycle began with the creation of steel billets (Platinen), which were rolled into sheets (Helmbleche) and cut into squares (Quadratebleche). These were subsequently shaped into circular discs (Ronden) for the deep drawing process. The transformation into a finished helmet shell required six to seven cold-drawing stages, interspersed with annealing to relieve internal stresses and prevent metal fracturing. Following the shaping of the shell, the edges were rolled and the vent and rivet holes were punched. The final structural integrity was achieved through a hardening process involving heating the shells and quenching them in a specialized oil bath—a mixture of mineral and vegetable oils—which also provided a primary blackened finish (blueing). A final tempering phase ensured the necessary elasticity. Quality control was rigorous; the Technical Military Committee (TMK) mandated batch testing where one percent of production was subjected to ballistic trials before acceptance.

Following the tempering phase and the successful completion of quality controls, the helmet shells underwent the final finishing stage. The exterior and interior surfaces were painted in a specific shade known as Feldbraun (also known as Isonzo-braun), a dull brownish-green pigment derived from linseed oil and mineral additives. To ensure the surface remained matte and non-reflective, materials such as gypsum or fine sand were mixed into the paint. Despite these efforts to provide a camouflage finish, the paint layer frequently became polished and shiny through prolonged field use and handling.

Once the paint had dried, the final assembly took place with the insertion of internal accessories, including the liner (typically made of three padded leather pockets attached to a metal or leather band) and the chinstrap. While the majority of liners were supplied by Adolph Müller & Söhne in Vienna, these components were sometimes purchased from private contractors. Regardless of their origin, all internal parts had to undergo rigorous inspection, a task often performed by Monturdepot 5. This department was frequently responsible for the final assembly of the padded liners and chinstraps into the painted shells—unless this process had already been completed by the manufacturing plants themselves—and subsequently marked the components with an official inspection stamp. Furthermore, although primarily dedicated to shell production, Adolf Westen A.G. and Austria Emaillierwerke A.G. were occasionally commissioned to manufacture the internal metal bands that supported the liner. For logistical transport, the completed helmets were stacked in towers; to prevent the fresh paint from scratching or sticking, sheets of waxed paper were placed between each unit. These stacks were then loaded into wooden crates or directly onto railway wagons for mass shipment toward the various fronts of the conflict.

The Austro-Hungarian industrial effort resulted in four distinct versions of the steel helmet, each characterized by specific design features and production standards. These models included the M17 Normalhelm (standard helmet), which followed the German pattern and was produced in sizes 64, 66, and 68; the M17 National pattern (also known as the Berndorfer model), manufactured exclusively in size 66; the M17/18 variant, commonly referred to by the nickname Paperino due to its unique visor shape, produced in size 66; and finally the M18 "Hungarian" model, which was manufactured in size 64.

Domestic production was carried out by several authorized facilities, each typically assigned to a specific shell size (measured by external circumference in centimeters) to optimize manufacturing efficiency:

- Arthur Krupp A.-G. Berndorfer Metallwarenfabrik; Berndorf, present day Austria: the stamp on the helmet was a little bear, followed by the size number, 66 for the national pattern and early Paperino model, and size 64 for the later M18

All the following industries produced only the stahlhelm m17 Normalhelm (standard helmet) according to the german pattern:

- Adolf Westen A.-G. Stanz-und Emaillierwerke; in Cilli/Celje, present day Slovenia: the stamp on the helmet was AW, followed by the size number 64
- Brüder Gottlieb und Brauchbar Brünner Email-, Eisen- und Blechwaren-Fabrik der Brüder Gottlieb & Brauchbar; in Brünn/Brno, present day Czech Republic: the stamp on the helmet was BGB, followed by the size number 66. BGB was also tasked with producing two prototypes face masks to be applied to the M17 stahlhelm (one, manufactured with a sheet produced by Phönix-Bleckmann still exists and can be seen in the following paragraph)
- Carl August Scholtz Metallwarenfabrik: the stamp on the helmet was C.A.S., followed by the size number 66
- Gebrüder Böhler & Co. A.-G.; in Kapfenberg, present day Austria.: the stamp on the helmet was a star, followed by the size number 66
- Manfred Weiss Stahl- und Metallwerke A.-G.; in Tschepel/Csepel, Budapest, present day Hungary: the stamp on the helmet was an interposed M on a W, followed by the size number 64
- Warchalowsky, Eissler & Co. A.-G.; in Vienna, present day Austria: the stamp on the helmet was WE, followed by the size number 66 or 68 (Warchalowsky was the only factory, with the sole exception of Berndorfer, to produce helmets in more than one size)

The average dimensions and weight of the German-pattern steel helmets produced in Austria-Hungary are similar to those of German production:

- size 64: L 30.5 cm, W 23 cm, H 17.4 cm
- size 66: L 31.2 cm, W 23.2 cm, H 17.5 cm
- size 66: L 30.8 cm, W 24.2 cm, H 17.3 cm
- size 68: L 31.8 cm, W 24 cm, H 17.7 cm

The sheet metal thickness of finished and painted helmets is of an average thickness slightly exceeding 1.15 mm across all production facilities. The weight of the helmet shells consistently exceeded the standard 1,100 grams, never falling below 1,200 grams. This weight increased progressively according to size, reaching nearly 1,400 grams for size 68 helmets complete with all internal accessories.

Throughout the war, over a million Stahlhelm of all domestic and imported variants were issued. This total includes approximately 416,000 helmets purchased from Germany between November 1916 and the end of the conflict. Domestic production reached significant volumes, with the Berndorfer Metallwarenfabrik contributing 141,264 units of the M17 National pattern and 195,307 units of the M18 "Hungarian" model. The most widely produced domestic variant was the M17 Normalhelm (German pattern), with 534,013 units manufactured in total, the majority of which were produced at the Berndorf facility.

==== Austro-Hungarian M1917 - Normalhelm ====
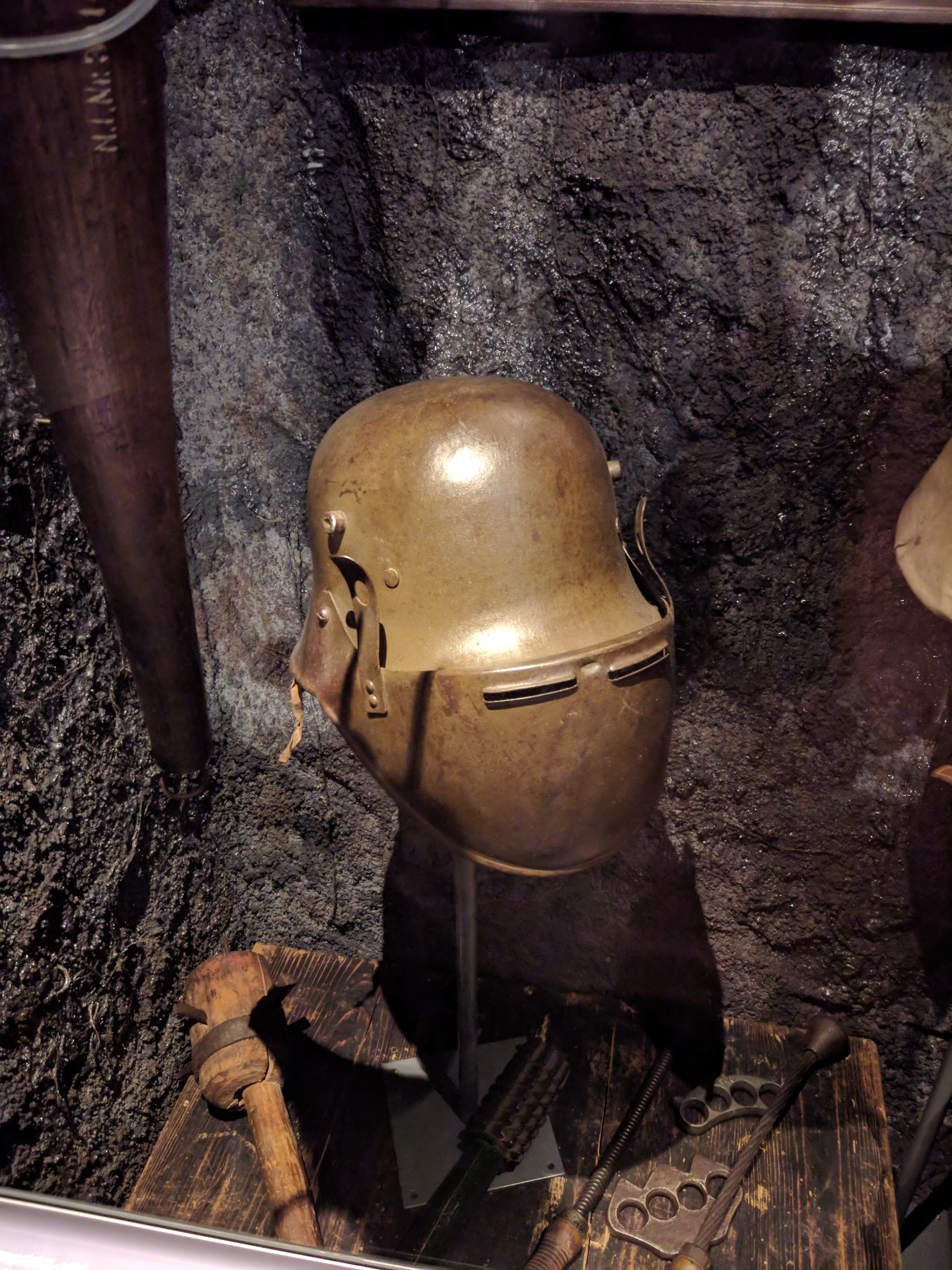
Austrian M17 stahlhelm "german style" with experimental face mask developed by BGB

The Austrian M17 helmet was similar to the German M16, it was officially called "nach deutschem Muster" i.e. "following Germany's example" or simply Normalhelm (standard helmet).

The M17 served as the cornerstone of Austro-Hungarian head protection, functioning as the primary model issued to the vast majority of imperial and royal forces. From May 1917 till the end of World War I 534,013 were produced, many of which were manufactured at the Krupp in Berndorf, Lower Austria. While it shared the general silhouette and ballistic principles of the German M16, it was a distinct domestic adaptation refined to meet the specific logistical and material constraints of the Dual Monarchy. The helmet was defined by its high-domed shell, steep visor, and an extended neck guard designed for comprehensive coverage. A subtle yet significant ergonomic improvement over the original German design was the placement of the chinstrap attachment rivets, which were set higher on the shell to provide greater comfort for the wearer.

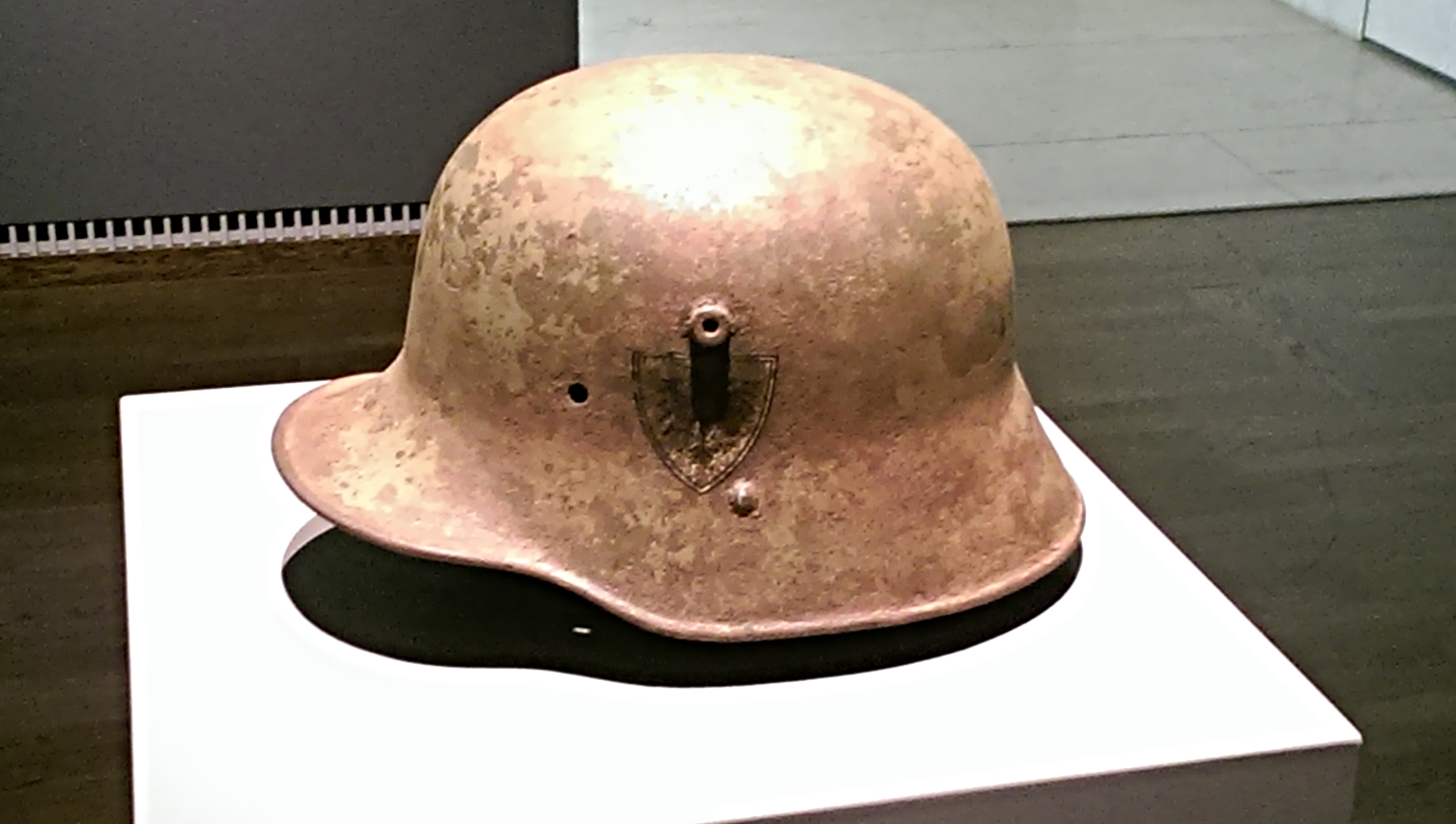
Austrian M17 Normalhelm

Its most recognizable feature and the primary way to differentiate it from German-made counterparts, as mentioned above, was the chinstrap system. Unlike the leather straps used by Germany, the Austro-Hungarian version utilized coarse canvas or hemp webbing in shades ranging from kaki to olive green. This strap was secured directly to the internal liner band through metal loops or D-rings, whereas the German pattern relied on mounting posts riveted to the shell itself. These canvas straps were typically fitted with a pronged buckle and featured anywhere from six to twelve adjustment eyelets.

The interior of the helmet was equally diverse, containing three internal pads anchored to a lightweight metal band perforated with holes; the hole liner assembly was fixed in the helmet thanks to three split pins, on the side and one (usually taller) on the back. These pads were produced from a wide variety of leathers, with tones spanning from traditional brown to white, the latter often being sourced from rabbit or kidskin. The leather was generally thinner and more fragile than that used by their German ally. As the war progressed and resources became increasingly scarce, the materials used for these liners became more eclectic, and by the end of the war the pads usually were made with oilcloth; these pads were often reinforced on the reverse side with small strips of leather and a metal washer for added durability. The pouches containing the horsehair padding were fashioned from various textiles, sometimes even featuring intricate or colourful patterns.

==== Berndorfer variants ====
Starting in the spring of 1917, the Berndorfer company initiated the production of steel helmets, initially manufacturing shields for the national model using its own materials and supplying them as complete sets with internal linings. By 1918, the factory transitioned to producing steel helmets based on the German design, utilizing steel sheets provided by the state. The Metallwarenfabrik A. Krupp of Berndorf held a unique position within the Dual Monarchy as the only manufacturer to produce every variety of helmet, including both domestic designs and those based on the German model. The company was particularly notable for its total industrial self-sufficiency, as it was able to manufacture all helmet components and any necessary spare parts entirely in-house. To shape these helmets through the deep-drawing process, Berndorfer used steel sheets sourced from several prominent mills, such as Phönix of Bleckmann, Böhler, and, by 1918, Resicza. This scale of operation established the company as one of the top three Helmwerke (helmet factories), and potentially even the largest, in terms of the total volume of head protections produced for the empire. Every Stahlhelm (steel helmet) manufactured in Berndorf is identified by a very specific trademark stamped into the neck guard, which features a stylized bear sitting above a number indicating the helmet's circumference.

The Arthur Krupp factory was the first industrial facility in Austria-Hungary to mass-produce a combat helmet developed by the domestic industry. This early model had a somewhat clunky appearance and was stamped with a degree of imprecision that resulted in slight physical variations between individual specimens. While these helmets were consistently produced in a size 66 circumference, the thickness and weight of the steel could vary significantly due to the inconsistent supply of steel from different production runs and foundries. The lines of the Berndorfer model, while broadly echoing the profile of the German model 1916 Stahlhelm, were somewhat crude, reflecting the difficulties the factory faced when attempting to precisely bend the national steel sheets provided by Bleckmann of Mürzzuschlag and other domestic suppliers. Despite being heavy and thick (often exceeding standard measurements by several tenths of a millimeter), this helmet provided a false sense of security, as it proved to be the least effective in terms of ballistic protection compared to the national production that followed. This design originated from early blueprints by the TMK (Technisches Militärkomitee) from the previous year and, while influenced by German aesthetics, it possessed a unique and charming character that is highly valued by modern collectors. In contemporary records, it was officially and emphatically referred to as the Stahlhelm nach inländischem Muster (steel helmet according to the national model) or the Stahlhelm inländisches Krupp-Mod. (national steel helmet Krupp model), with a total of 141,264 units being produced.

In late autumn of 1917, a new variant of the Berndorfer made a brief and experimental appearance as part of a second order from the KM (Kriegsministerium). This version is now commonly known among collectors by the playful nickname "Paperino". During the final year of the war, production was primarily dedicated to the model 1918, which was almost entirely standardized to match the German version. At the time, this helmet was produced only in a 64 cm size and was officially called the Stahlhelm deutsches Krupp-Mod. (German steel helmet Krupp model). Today, collectors often use the improper and somewhat misleading term Hungarian to describe it. Krupp manufactured 195,307 of these helmets, and despite the economic hardships caused by the Allied blockade of the Monarchy, the model 18 featured technical simplifications and solutions that were more advanced than those used by their German counterparts. Beyond its helmet production, Berndorfer was well-known for manufacturing brass artillery shell casings and specialized in the steel-jeting of lead bullets for small arms. The factory's contribution to the war effort was considered so vital that in 1917, a major project was undertaken to expand the railway lines and depots specifically for the Metallwarenfabrik. This project, which was finalized on 15 January 1918, allowed the factory to continue its operations, including the production of Stahlhelme, well into the 1930s.

===== Berndorfer M1917 - national design =====
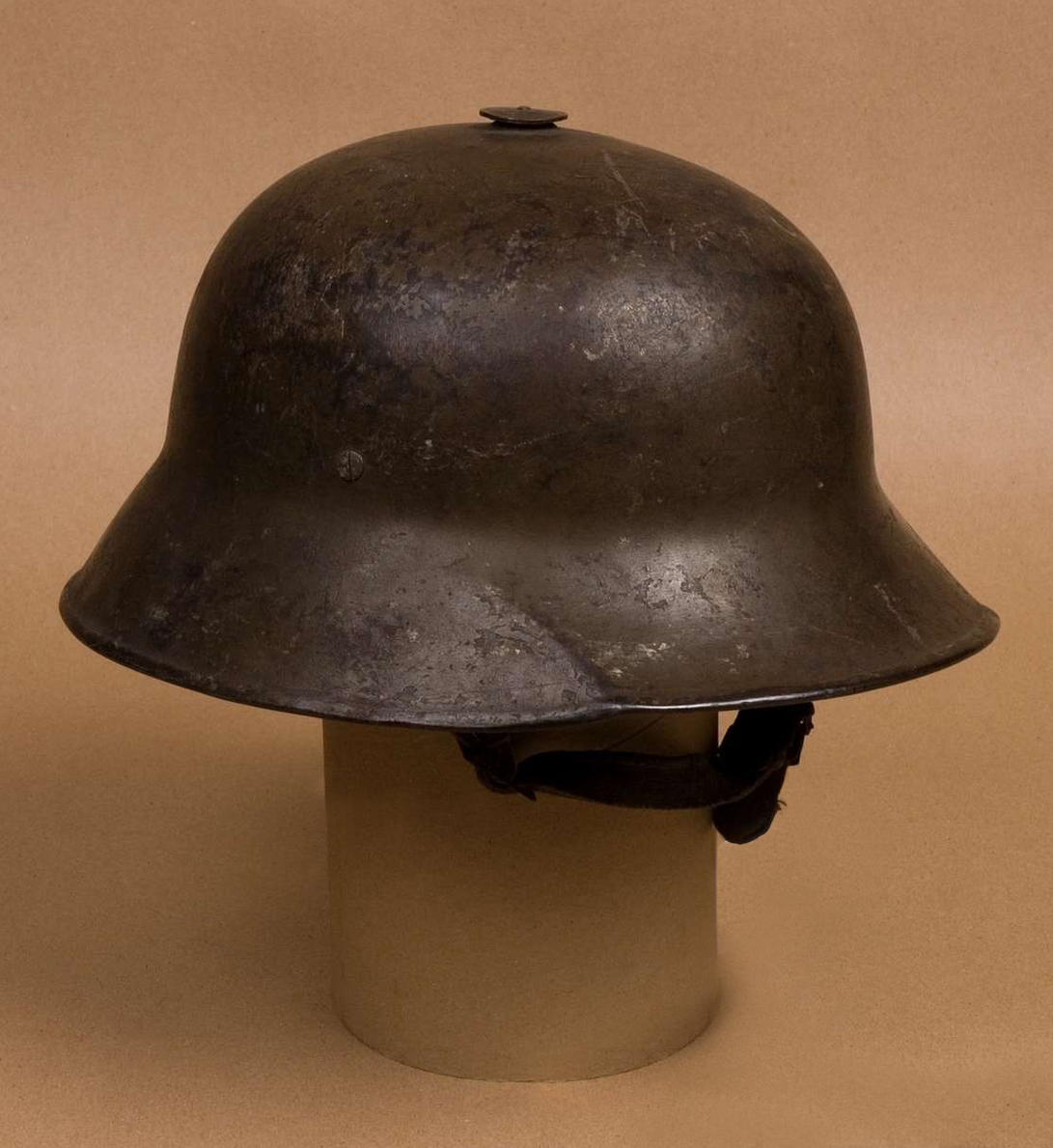
The Austrian Berndorfer M17 variant

During the second half of 1916, discussions between the Imperial Ministry of War and domestic industrial firms revealed that existing Austrian machinery was only capable of producing a steel helmet simpler in design than the German model. This led to the creation of the Berndorfer, which served as the pioneer of the entire national production line until more advanced machinery could be imported from Germany. By October 1916, the Krupp factory in Berndorf presented prototypes made of special steel with a thickness ranging between 1.2 and 1.35 mm, utilizing externally sourced steel sheets. A significant turning point occurred in December 1916 when an order originally intended for the Böhler company for 15,000 Stahlhauben was reduced to just 2,000 units, with the remaining flat, square steel sheets measuring 490 by 490 mm and 1.2 mm in thickness being redirected to the Berndorfer factory. This variability in the supply of raw materials explains why modern researchers find such significant differences in the thickness, weight, and even the profile of these helmets. Measurements taken from surviving specimens show that the steel thickness can fluctuate from 1.12 mm to 1.44 mm, which directly impacts the total weight of the helmet, including accessories, ranging from 1,200 to 1,404 grams. Generally, the heavier helmets belong to the earliest production runs featuring black felt internal rims, while the lighter versions are typically from later batches that used metal supports with large ventilation holes.

Physically, these national models adhere to average dimensions of 30 cm in width at the base and 25 cm in depth, with a height slightly under 16 cm that varies depending on the prominence of the ventilation dome. While the external circumference is consistently around 66.5 cm, the helmet was adapted to individual head sizes (ranging from 55 to 58) through the thickness of the internal padding. A hallmark of the Berndorfer a stylized bear trademark stamped inside the neck guard, positioned with its paws facing downward above the size number 66. Additionally, military control stamps in black oil-based ink are often found nearby, indicating that the helmet passed inspection. These stamps, usually about 25 mm in size, often feature the abbreviated location Berndf., though the 1918 production would eventually display the name in full. Inside the crown, batch numbers and acronyms from the steel mills are often visible, such as "B" or "P" for Phönix of Bleckmann or "B" for Böhler, unless they have been obscured by layers of paint.

The internal lining of the Berndorfer underwent a complex evolution. Initially, based on German regulations but seeking to save leather, the factory installed white felt rims that proved to be fragile and wore out quickly. These were replaced by black felt rims and, subsequently, by a highly elaborate and expensive cap-style lining. This specialized internal system consisted of four trapezoidal pads made of pressed and impregnated felt, spaced apart to allow for air circulation and sewn with twine onto a perforated metal rim. The base of this cap was made of red or dark orange ribbed oilcloth, which culminated in a cloth crown that could be adjusted with a drawstring. This intricate assembly was designed to maintain a 2 cm survival gap between the metal shell and the soldier's skull to prevent injury from impacts that might dent the steel. Over time, these costly linings were simplified into a more traditional metal rim characterized by large lightening and ventilation holes, supporting three pads initially made of leather (supplied by firms like Franz Zeller) and later of red ribbed oilcloth.

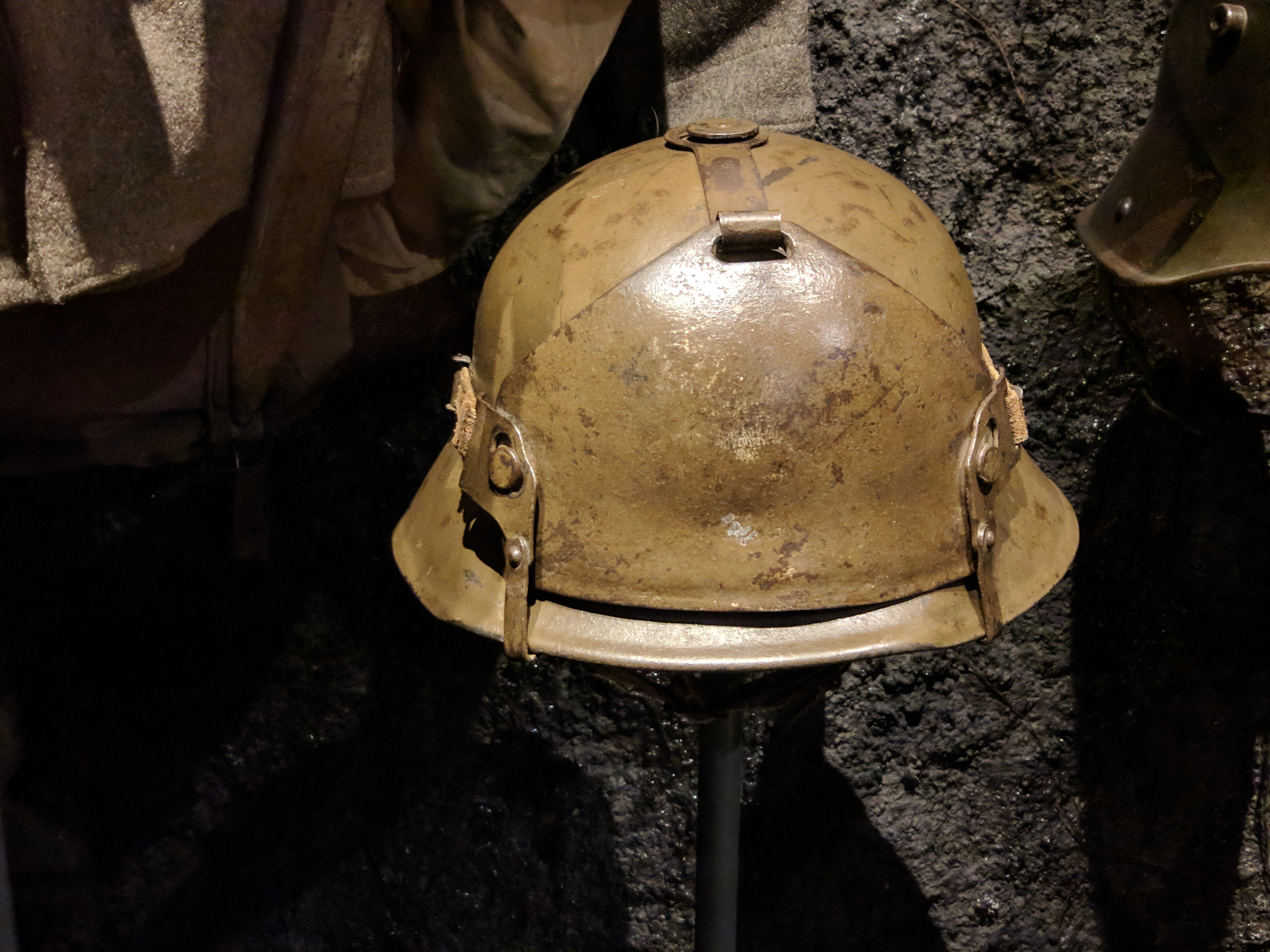
Berndorfer M17 with its stirnpanzer/stirnschild Berndorfer Stirnpanzer Berndorfer Stirnpanzer pouch

Ventilation is another unmistakable characteristic of the Berndorfer, featuring a stepped dome with four small holes covered externally by a metal disk approximately 26 mm in diameter. This disk was securely riveted or nailed into place, with the rounded head of the fastener visible inside the helmet at the center of the air holes. To assemble these components, the factory used side brackets for the chinstrap, which were secured to the shell by flat-headed conical screws. Early models typically featured screws with a 9 mm diameter, while later production runs and the Paperino variant saw this size reduced to 7 mm with a slightly domed head. At the rear of the helmet, the lining was held in place by either a pronounced conical screw or a bifurcated downward-curving plate, both of which also served as an anchor point for the heavy frontal shield if one was used. The chinstrap was made of a characteristic textile material, usually double-layered hemp about 1.5 cm wide, featuring three rows of longitudinal stitching. The ends were reinforced with quilted patches, often made from recycled blue-grey oilcloth originally intended for cavalry headgear covers. The adjustment system included a sliding two-slot buckle and a pressure-operated clasp with a lever that could be either curved or square-shaped. The shorter section of the strap measured between 11 and 12 cm, while the adjustable portion could extend up to 30 cm, allowing for a snug fit that did not press against the soldier's throat. To address the issue of the helmet becoming shiny and reflective through use, anti-reflective fabric covers were issued to approximately 10% of the troops, particularly for those on dangerous assignments like patrols or assault units. These covers were secured by a drawstring tied at the center of the neck guard and featured a reinforced, leather-trimmed opening to accommodate the ventilation disk. For even greater protection, a frontal shield known as the Stirnschild was developed. Weighing nearly a kilogram and possessing a thickness of 7 mm, this armor plate could stop infantry bullets from Italian and Russian rifles at distances greater than 50 to 100 meters. The shield was attached via a complex system: a steel blade at the top with a ring that slipped over the helmet's ventilation disk, two hooks that caught the front visor, and a textile strap—identical in construction to the chinstrap—that wrapped around the helmet and hooked onto the rear conical screw. Because of its significant weight, this shield was intended only for short-term use in specific combat roles, such as by sentries or observers in the trenches. Instructions for the care of these helmets emphasized that they should never be exposed to fire, as heat would destroy the ballistic resistance of the steel, and that any damage to the paint should be repaired immediately to prevent rust. When not in use, the helmet was to be tied to a backpack or hung from the belt using a separate attachment, while the heavy frontal shield was stored in its own dedicated pouch.

===== Berndorfer M1917/1918 "Paperino" =====
The final phase of helmet production at the Arthur Krupp factory in Berndorf was marked by the emergence of a transitionary model that represented an irreversible evolution toward the standardized German design. Appearing on the Isonzo front and near the city of Gorizia toward the end of the conflict, this rare combat helmet was likely issued to units such as the 2nd Gebirgschützen (a regiment with a high percentage of Slovenian and Balkan soldiers). Today, this specific iteration is colloquially known among Italian collectors as the Paperino (Donald Duck) due to the distinctive and somewhat whimsical silhouette it presents when viewed from above. This hybrid design was born in late 1917 and early 1918 as a technical compromise, utilizing the factory's existing machinery to emulate the aesthetics of the German Stahlhelm. While the front and rear profiles remained largely similar to the standard Berndorfer, the Paperino featured a more slender and elongated dome along with a higher visor, giving it a profile much closer to the German model 1916. A notable technical characteristic of this production was the treatment of the helmet's edge; rather than being rolled or turned, the edge was left as a sharp, un-rimmed border. This was a result of the deep-drawing process acting upon the circular Ronde (metal blank) cut from square steel sheets, which involved nearly the entire perimeter of the material and left a raw, potentially sharp finish. It is believed that these helmets were manufactured using the remaining 1.2 mm thick steel sheets originally diverted from the Böhler company to Berndorf by the KM (Kriegsministerium) in December 1916.

The design of the Paperino was significantly influenced by the early German Stahlhelm variants, specifically those known in English-speaking circles as square dip helmets, which were characterized by long side flares and a wide, short visor. By pushing the limits of the 490 by 490 mm steel sheets, Berndorf's engineers managed to increase the height of the dome by approximately 0.5 cm compared to the standard model. While the base length remained the canonical 30 cm, the width was increased to 26 cm, making it slightly broader than its predecessor. Because this model was produced in very limited numbers during the final months of the war, surviving examples are exceptionally rare. Currently, only two confirmed specimens are available for study in public institutions: one held at the Museo Francesco Baracca in Lugo and another at the Museo Storico Italiano della Guerra in Rovereto. These two helmets, while belonging to the same family, exhibit minor differences that reveal the experimental nature of the production.

The specimen located in Lugo retains the traditional stepped dome ventilation system with four holes, identical to the earlier Berndorfer model. In contrast, the Rovereto helmet features a modified ventilation system consisting of a thick metal cylinder with a conical head riveted into the dome, which utilizes three rectangular air slots. Both helmets were fitted with the same internal accessories, although the Lugo specimen is currently missing its padding. The external side screws used to anchor the internal rim are slightly different between the two, consistent with the variations seen in late-production Berndorfer helmets equipped with red ribbed oilcloth linings. The interior fittings, including the metal rims with large ventilation holes and the quilted reinforcements behind the padding lobes, are typical of the Krupp-Berndorf factory's craftsmanship. The chinstraps are also characteristic, made of textile with identical sliding adjustment buckles, though the pressure-clamping lever on the Lugo helmet appears slightly shorter.

Another curious detail found on both museum pieces is the presence of bifurcated rear plates. These were originally intended to secure the strap of a frontal reinforcement shield (the Stirnschild), though it is highly unlikely that a specific shield was ever produced for this short-lived helmet run; any such installation would have required the use of the older, impractical Berndorfer shields. The Rovereto specimen also features a large white circular recognition patch painted on the rear of the shell, and its internal padding pockets are made of white fabric with thin dark stripes. In terms of weight, the Lugo helmet (missing its pads) weighs 1,250 grams, while the complete Rovereto specimen weighs 1,304 grams. Despite the slight deviations in measurement caused by the imprecise stamping process of the era, both helmets represent the final domestic attempt by the Dual Monarchy to modernize its head protection before fully adopting the German patterns.

===== Berndorfer M1918 "Hungarian" - Krupp model =====
In the final stages of the Great War, the Berndorfer factory distinguished itself within the Dual Monarchy by independently adapting its production to the German model 1918 design well before its allies or any formal regulations were established. This helmet is frequently referred to by collectors as the ungherese (Hungarian) model, though this term is technically improper and somewhat misleading. This misconception likely stems from the fact that many soldiers of Hungarian nationality were equipped with this gear, particularly during the Piave offensive and later in the French theater. By July 1918, these helmets were visible on the imperial and royal troops of the XVIII Army Corps commanded by FML Ludwig Goiginger as they fought alongside German forces in France. This corps included the 1st Division (composed of approximately 8,400 rifles and the 5th and 61st regiments) and the 35th Division (with 10,500 rifles and the 62nd and 64th Hungarian regiments, the latter counting a soldier named Tamm among its ranks).

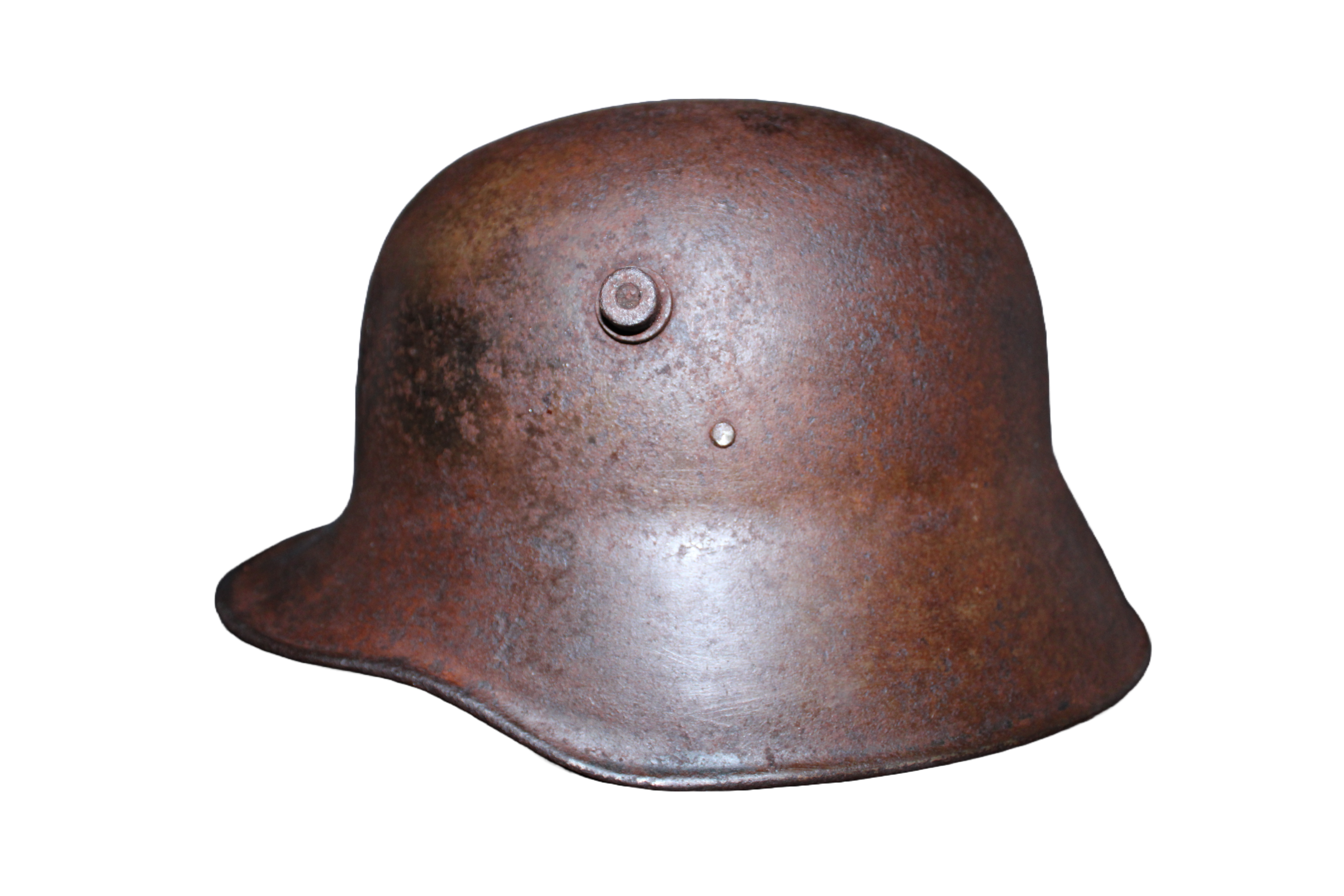
The Berndorfer M18 "Hungarian" helmet

The Austrian-produced model 1918 featured several technical departures from the German original, most notably in its internal attachment system and finishing. The method for securing the liner to the shell was significantly more advanced than the German design, utilizing two fixed internal pins or studs with rounded heads that were riveted through small holes in the sides of the shell. The metal liner rim, which supported three leather pads and internal cushions, was designed to snap onto these solid supports by being rotated into place. While the rear rivet was similar to other Stahlhelm types, it featured a crucial modification: the hole in the shell was rectangular or oval in shape (a rational design choice that eliminated the internal wobbling or oscillation of the liner). The chinstrap, which was approximately 20 mm wide, was secured by a toothed buckle and included a two-slot sliding adjuster on the right side for length control. As with the German models, a leather membrane was included to protect the soldier's chin.

The aesthetic and protective qualities of the helmet were defined by its specific paint and manufacturing processes. The Berndorfer

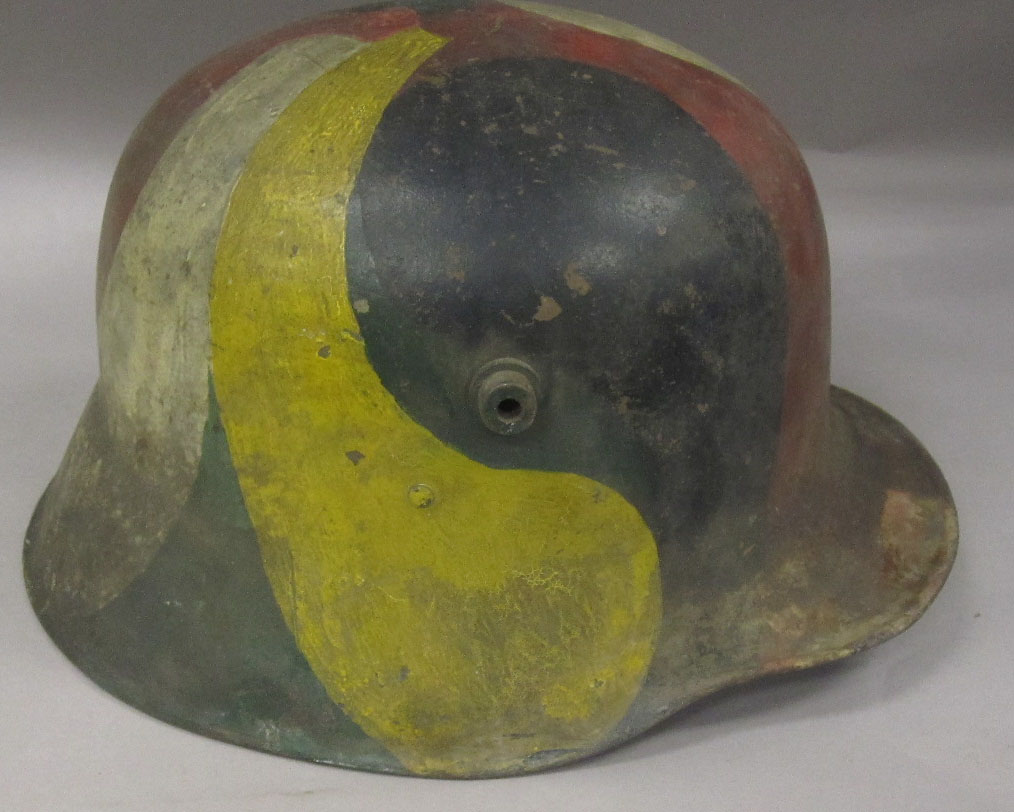
Berndorfer M18 with an interesting camo pattern, probably used by one Austro-Hungarian soldier sent to the western front

1918 was typically finished in a matte brown or Feldbraun (field brown) color. To achieve a non-reflective surface, the factory mixed inert and opacifying materials such as gesso (plaster) into the paint. This technique effectively neutralized the dangerous reflections caused by rain or harsh light, making the use of anti-reflective cloth covers—which were becoming standard by 1917—largely unnecessary. While some early production helmets became shiny over time due to friction and wear, the later models were noticeably rough to the touch. This textured surface also allowed for improvised field camouflage to be applied more easily.

The dire economic conditions of the Austro-Hungarian Empire toward the end of the conflict were starkly reflected in the production of this helmet, which was manufactured in only a single size (circumference 64). This lack of variation often made the helmet difficult or even painful to wear, and period photographs frequently show soldiers wearing the Stahlhelm over their field caps or failing to secure it properly, which compromised its protective capabilities. In some instances, soldiers were forced to remove the internal cushions from the leather pads to make room for larger head sizes. Despite these limitations, the Berndorfer model 1918 was an innovative piece of equipment that even provided technical cues for late-war German helmet refinements, particularly regarding paint textures and internal accessories.

Technical specifications show that these helmets, often made from steel blanks (the Ronde) supplied by the Resicza (R) or Phönix (P) mills, weighed approximately 1,300 grams when complete and had an average steel thickness of 1.15 mm. The factory's self-sufficiency remained a hallmark of its operation, as almost every accessory was produced in-house. A unique feature was the stitching of the cloth pockets to the leather pads; unlike other manufacturers, Berndorfer's stitching crossed the entire horizontal line of the leather and intersected with vertical lines, sometimes reinforcing the entire perimeter of the pad lobes. These leather components, occasionally sourced from the Viennese firm Franz Zeller, were often stamped with the factory's bear logo or internal numbers. The final assembly of the helmet shell was characterized by the closure of the edge rim on the left side, which was often finished with a sharp or somewhat imprecise edge. The rear oval hole for the rivet, which featured rounded edges and a pronounced external head, completed the assembly by securing the liner between the fixed temporal supports. These textile and metallic accessories, including the varying weaves of the chinstraps and the specific pressure-clamping buckles, were also used as repair components for imported or captured helmets throughout the empire's final months.

=== M1933 ===
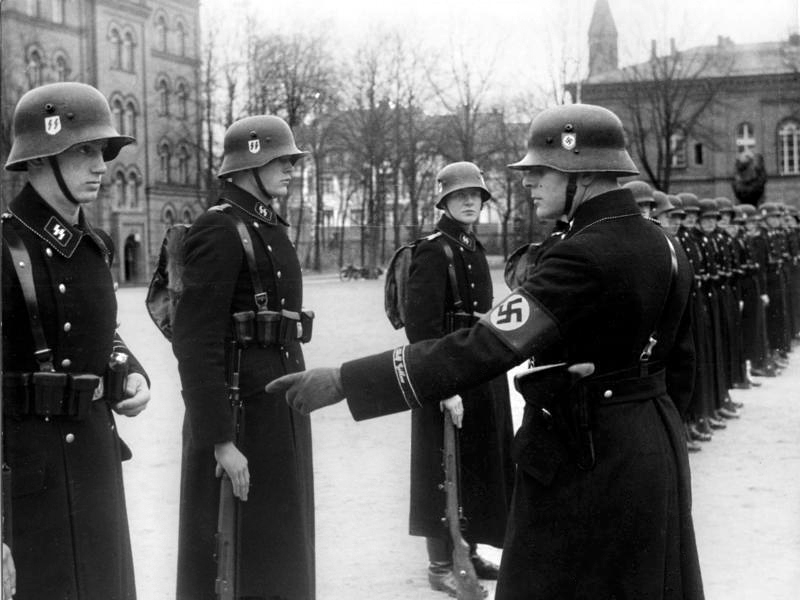
Leibstandarte SS Adolf Hitler troops wearing refurbished WW1 Stahlhelme, during a drill inspection in Berlin, 1938

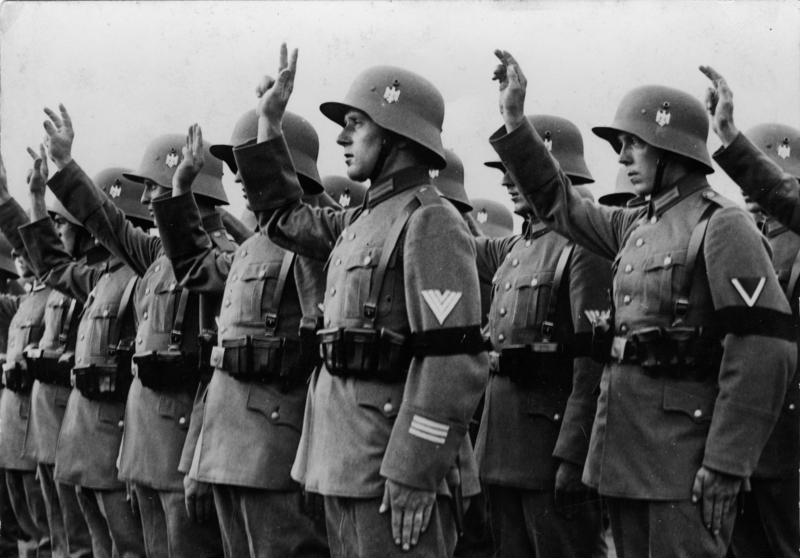
German Reichswehr soldiers wearing WW1 Stahlhelme, but with the new insignia

In 1932 the Army High Command ordered the testing of a new prototype helmet intended to replace the older models. It was made entirely from a composite plastic material called "Vulkanfiber". The Model 1933 Vulkanfiber helmet kept the basic form of previous helmets but was much lighter. It was put into limited production following favourable field tests in early 1933 and small numbers were issued to Reichswehr infantry, artillery and communications units. It was removed from service following the introduction of the M1935 helmet and most of the remaining stock were reissued to civil organizations such as fire brigades and police forces. Some examples were also retained for parade use by senior officers, who were not generally issued with the Stahlhelm.

=== M1935 ===
In 1934 tests began on an improved Stahlhelm, whose design was a development of World War I models. The company "Eisenhüttenwerke Thale" (today Thaletec) carried out prototype design and testing, with Dr Friedrich Schwerd once again taking a hand.

The new helmet was pressed from sheets of molybdenum steel in several stages. The size of the flared visor and skirt was reduced, and the large projecting lugs for the obsolete armour shield were eliminated. The ventilator holes were retained but were set in smaller hollow rivets mounted to the helmet's shell. The edges of the shell were rolled over, creating a smooth edge along the helmet. Finally, a completely new leather suspension, or liner, was incorporated that greatly improved the helmet's safety, adjustability, and comfort for each wearer. These improvements made the new M1935 helmet lighter, more compact, and more comfortable to wear than the previous designs.

The Army's Supreme Command within the Third Reich's Wehrmacht or combined armed forces officially accepted the new helmet on 25 June 1935 and it was intended to replace all other helmets in service.

More than 1 million M1935 helmets were manufactured in the first two years after its introduction, and millions more were produced until 1940 when the basic design and production methods were changed.

=== Gladiator civil defense helmet ===
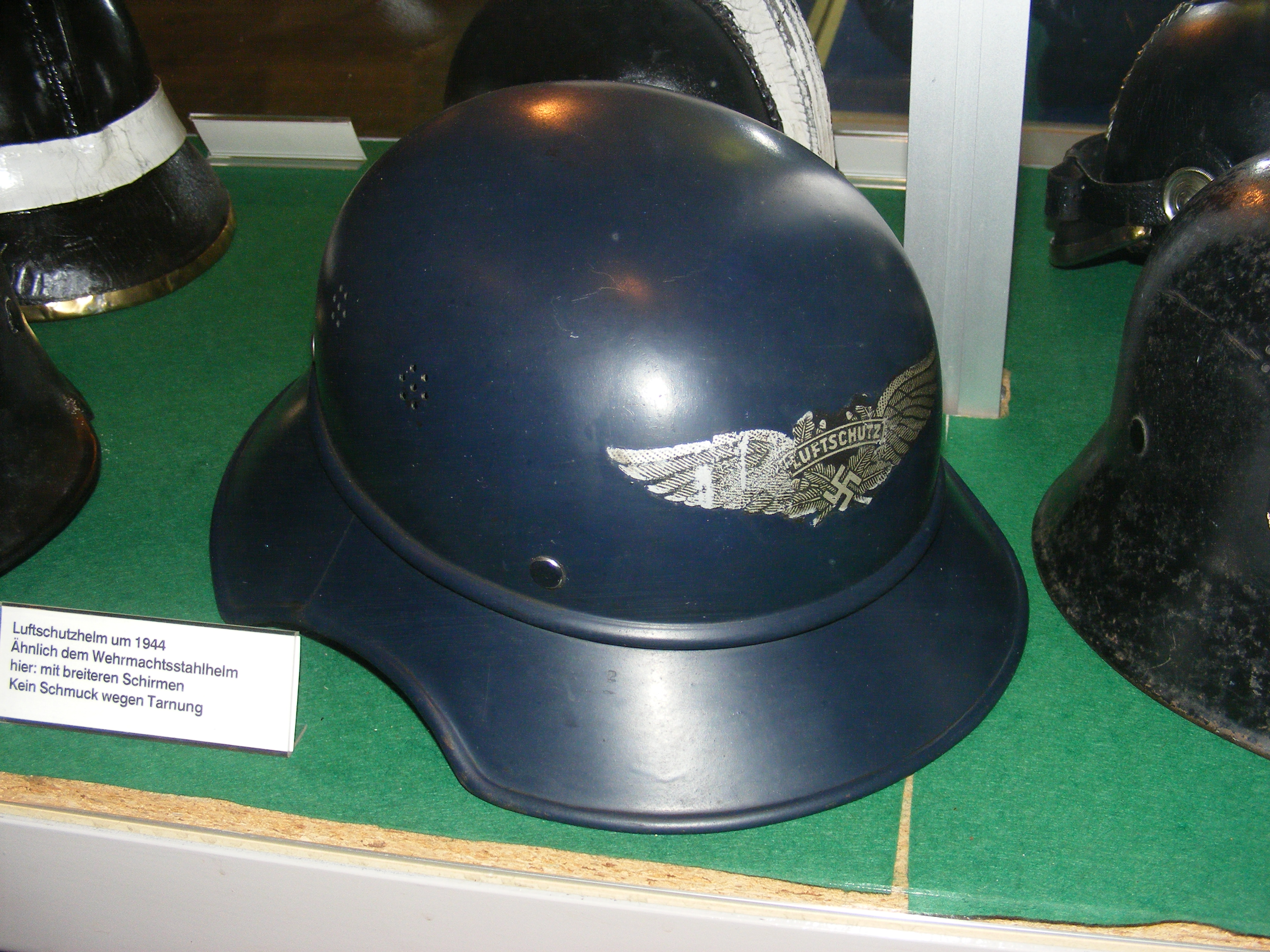
1944 pattern Luftschutz helmet

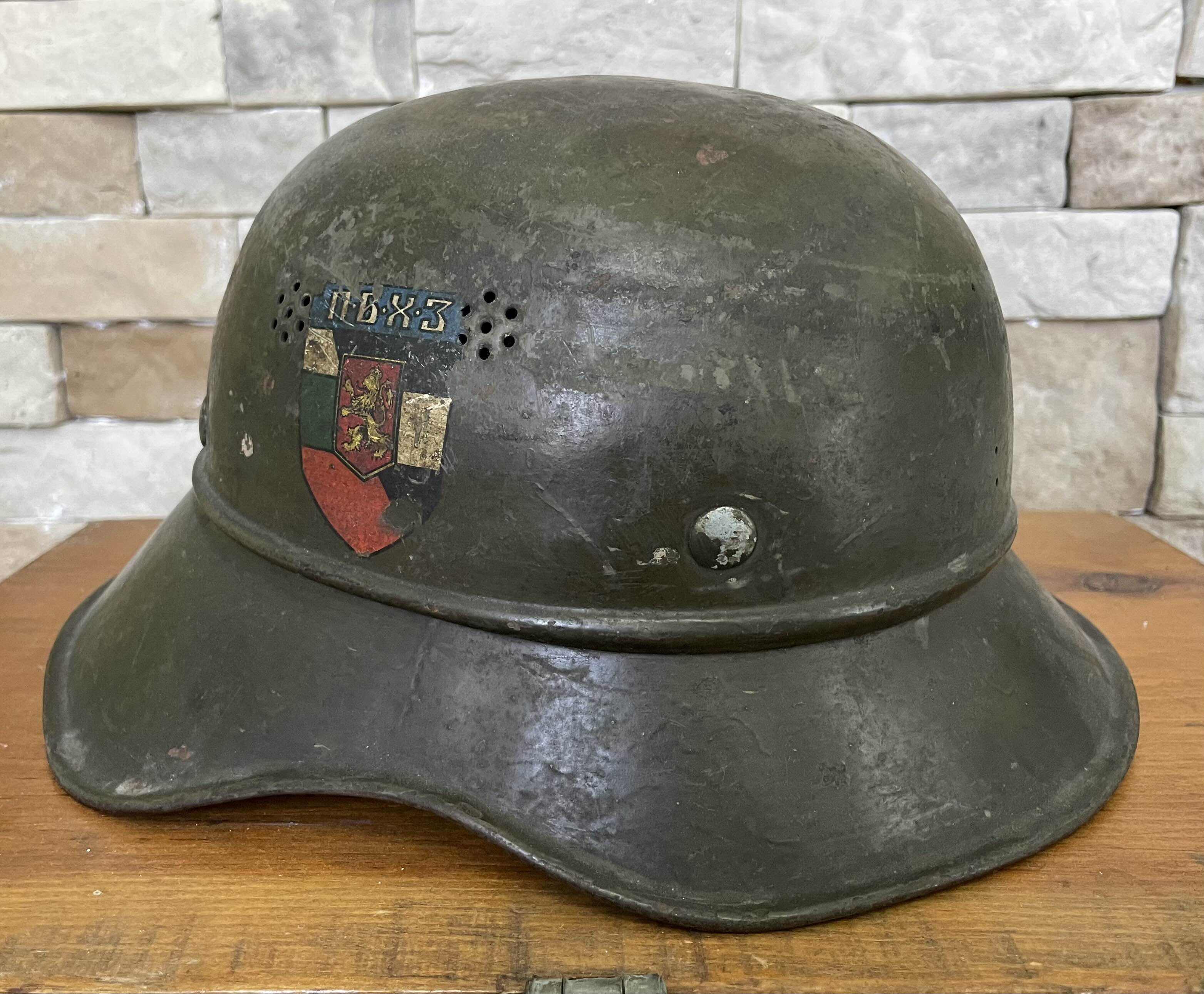
Bulgarian issued M38 Gladiator Helmet for Anti air and Chemical Defense

In 1938, the Germans developed a variant of the Stahlhelm with a wider, flared peak and ventilation holes originally intended for civil defense and Luftschutz personnel. Known as the gladiator pattern, the privately purchased Luftschutz helmet was originally made from three pieces of steel and typically painted black or dark blue. Later in the war these were issued to Volkssturm personnel, and sometimes repainted in Feldgrün. By 1944, the helmets were stamped from a single steel sheet, and the original leather lining replaced with vinyl or cloth to reduce costs. A modified postwar version in fluorescent green, white or yellow continued to be issued to rescue workers in the Bundesrepublik until the early 1990s.

=== M1940 ===
The M1935 design was slightly modified in 1940 to simplify its construction, the manufacturing process now incorporating more automated stamping methods. The principal change was to stamp the ventilator hole mounts directly onto the shell, rather than utilizing separate fittings. In other respects, the M1940 helmet was identical to the M1935. The Germans still referred to the M1940 as the M1935, while the M1940 designation were given by collectors.

==== Fallschirmjäger version ====
A variant of the M1935 helmet with a shell lacking the projecting visor and deep flared rim was issued to Fallschirmjäger (German paratrooper) units. It was so designed in order to lessen the risk of head injury on landing after a parachute jump; also to reduce the significant wind resistance and resulting neck trauma. Early Fallschirmjäger helmets were manufactured from existing M1935 helmets by removing the undesirable projections, which were omitted when the new design entered full production. The modified shell also incorporated a completely different and more substantial liner and chinstrap design that provided far more protection for German airborne troops. The chinstrap featured a four-point retention system that has come into use again by modern combat helmets such as the MICH since the late 1990s.

=== M1942 ===
The M1942 design was a result of wartime demands, by order of Hitler, to 'maintain intimidation but reduce cost'. The rolled edge on the shell was eliminated, creating an unfinished edge along the rim. This edge slightly flared out, along the base of the skirt, reducing the protection the helmet gave. The elimination of the rolled edge expedited the manufacturing process and reduced the amount of metal used in each helmet. Shell paint colours were typically matte grey-green (Heer) or grey-blue (Luftwaffe), and the decals were eliminated in 1943 to speed up production and reduce the helmet's combat visibility. Greater manufacturing flaws were also observed in M1942 helmets made late in the war.

=== M1944 ===
A new variant, designed in 1942 by the Institute for Defence Technical Materials Science in Berlin, was the so called M44. It was stamped out of one piece of metal, but with sloped sides. It was similar in appearance to the British 1944 Type Mk III helmet. They were tested in three variant models B, B/II, and C. The one selected for extensive tests was the B/II. They were produced by the Thale Eisenhüttenwerke. The B/II would later inspire the East German M56, which looked very similar to the M44. The M44 helmet was never approved for service and it remained a prototype.

=== M1945 ===
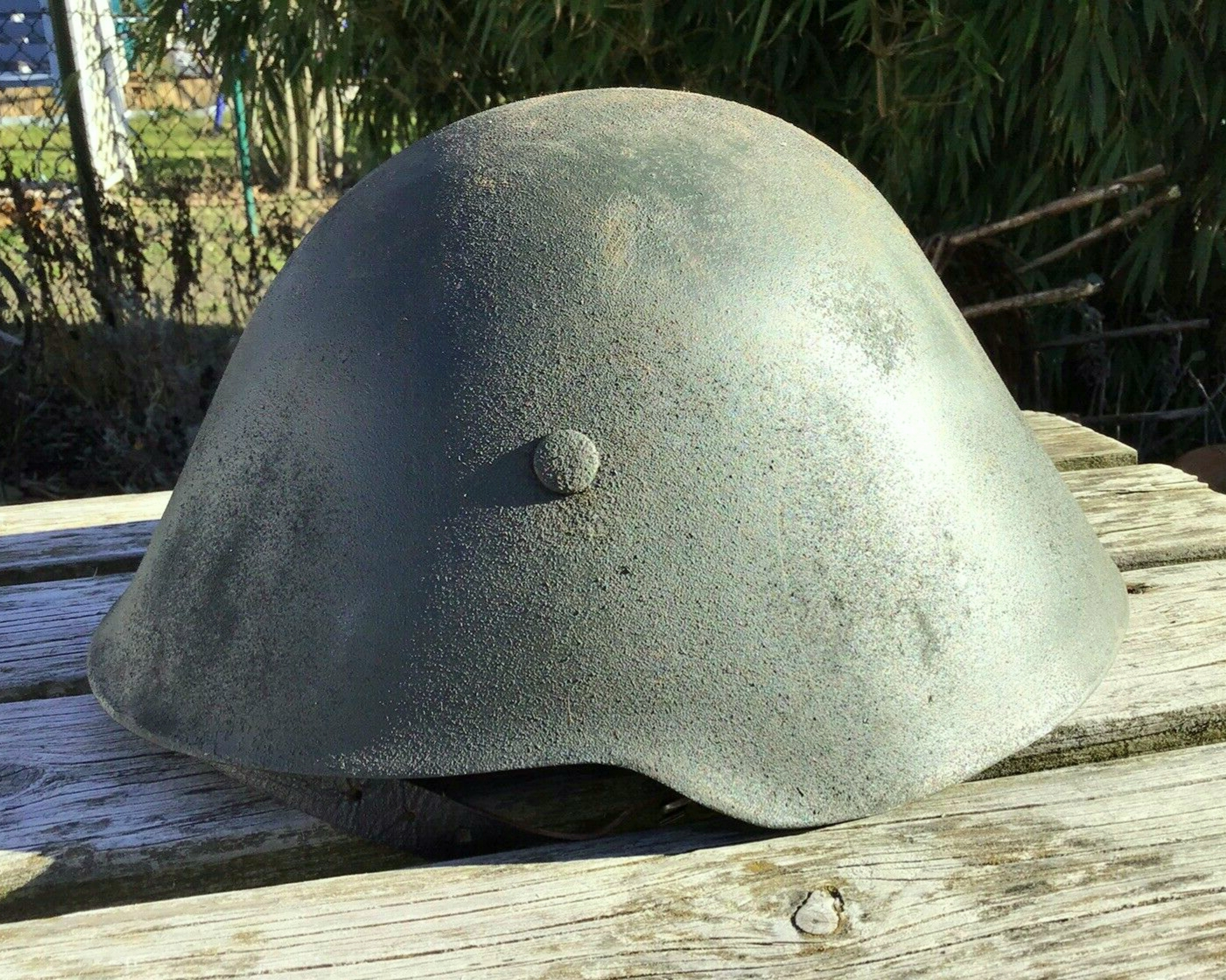
Replica of an M45 stahlhelm

There have been reports of a variant manufactured in the last months of the war. The M1945 was reported to have been similar to the M1942 design but did away completely with the ventilator. These helmets are reported to be extremely rare. Many collectors and historians are of the opinion that the M1945 helmet is just a regular M1942 helmet that lacked the vents simply because of machine malfunctions in the factory, or unfinished M1942 helmets that were completed in the post-war era.

=== East Germany variants ===
==== M1954 ====
It was an evolution of the prototype M1944 with a modified and more squared line. The appearance of the helmet was a transitional way between the M35 and the M44. It was nicknamed "Kesslerbombe" as a reference to the general Heinz Keßler. It was used by the KVP of the GDR and it was fitted with two different suspension systems during its life in service. The first one fixed with three rivets as in the WW2 models, the second type required further holes in the helmet shell. It was substituted by the helmet M1956.

==== M1956 ====
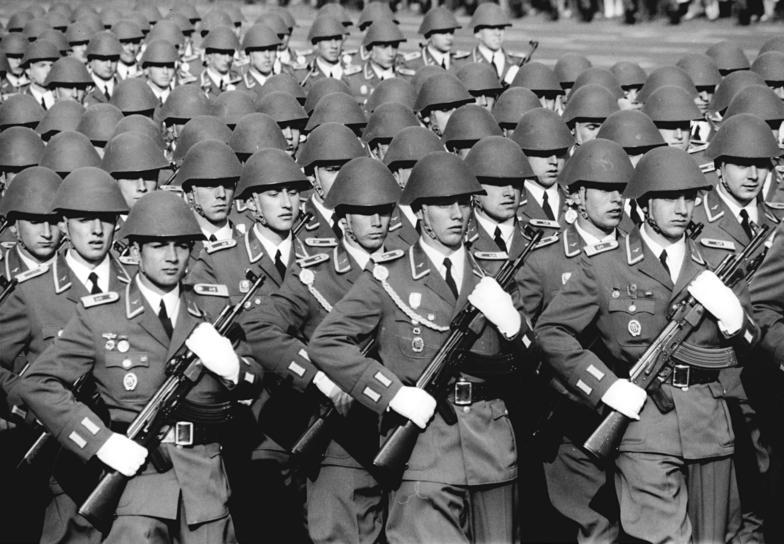
M1956 East German Stahlhelm (National People's Army parade, Berlin, 1974)

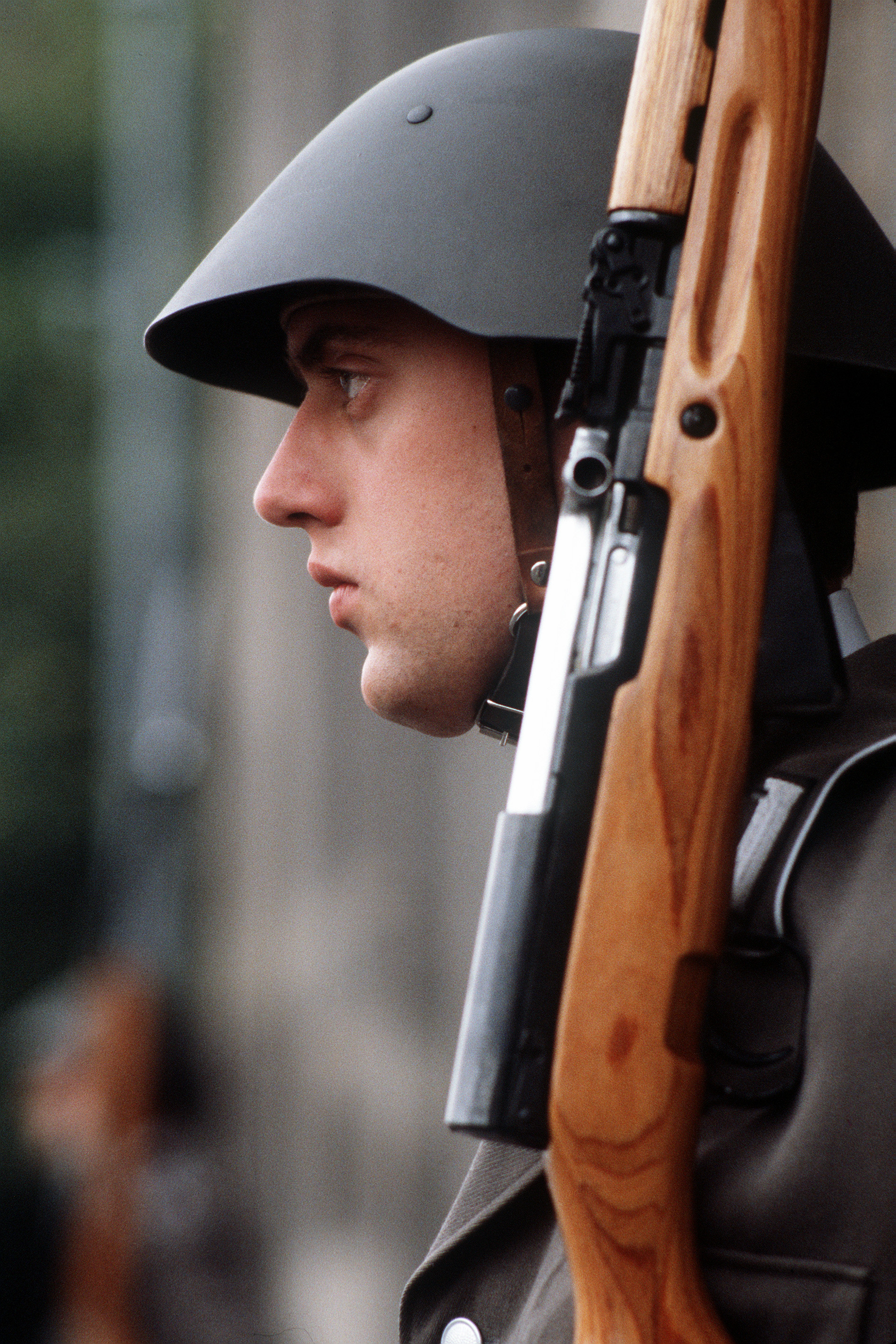
A sentry of the East German Friedrich Engels Guard Regiment wearing an M-56 helmet (Berlin, 1989)

The East German M-56 helmet was inspired by the 1942 designed helmet, intended as a replacement for the M1935/M1940 model Stahlhelm. It was initially developed for the Wehrmacht by the Institute for Defense Technical Materials Science in Berlin (see M1944 above). The helmet had seen trials since 1943 but was not adopted during World War II.

The design was not used until the requirement for a distinct German helmet for the Volkspolizei and the National People's Army arose. The East German leadership was motivated in large part by a desire to avoid provoking the offence that using a traditional Stahlhelm design would have caused East Germany's Warsaw Pact allies (especially Czechoslovakia, Poland and the Soviet Union), but a more practical military necessity was also present due to the continued use of surplus Stahlhelme by West German units, in particular border guards. Moreover, the East Germans suspected the West could re-issue the Stahlhelm on a general basis in the Bundeswehr at any time and therefore needed a helmet that was easily distinguishable from that of their potential enemy. For both reasons, the 1942 design was likely chosen because it was the most similar of all German designs to the most recognizable Soviet helmets, in particular the iconic SSh-40 design. Such a design not only served a political purpose but was one that NATO armies were unlikely to duplicate closely. Indeed, the M-56 was similar enough in appearance to the SSh-40 that some Westerners failed to realize its Germanic origins altogether and assumed the East Germans had adopted a Soviet design.

The M-56 helmet came in three basic versions, Mod 1 or I/56, Mod 2 or I/57 and Mod 3 or I/71, and was widely sold (or given) to Third World armies.

==== Gerät 605 ====
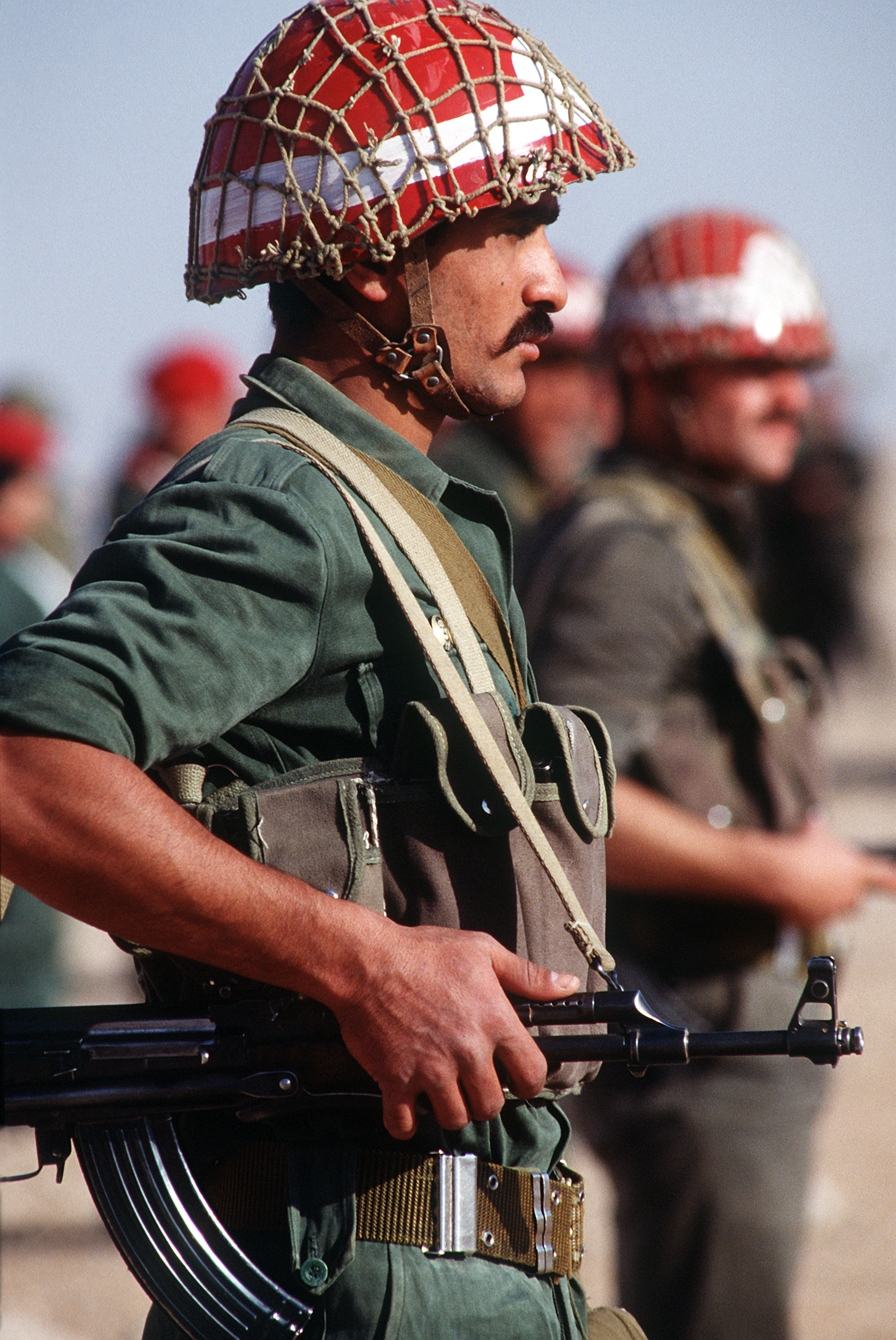
A member of the Syrian honor guard wearing the Gerät 605 (1992)

The Gerät 605, also referred to as the M82, was a direct improvement of the M-56 helmet and the final steel combat helmet designed by East Germany. The helmet's shape differed only slightly from its predecessor and the liner remained the same with little to no change.

It was initially intended to replace the M-56, but in March 1984, production was ordered to cease and the majority in stock were designated for export. The helmet was seen in use by Ba'athist Syria and Guyana, although it never saw widespread usage by the East German military.

=== West Germany variants ===
==== M40/51 ====
When the Bundesgrenzschutz (BGS) (Federal Border Guards of Germany) was formed in 1951, it was supplied with old salvaged and refurbished M35, M40 or M42 helmets. Among the changes made, there was the replacement of the interior and the introduction of new eyelets for the chinstrap, some welded inside the helmet some even fixed to the helmet with rivets. The helmets for the BGS were repainted in dark green RAL 6012.

With the progressive depletion of stocks, starting from 1951 new helmets were produced following the construction rules of the M40 model. Regarding the interior, was used the simplified M31 type, with a chinstrap directly fixed to it, (adopted above all by the police forces of the Länder), and a liner with a chinstrap fixed to the helmet according to the methods described above; this version was adopted by the BGS.

==== M40/53 ====
Starting in 1953, a further update of the interior was introduced with the type called I53, developed by the company Schuberth Werke Braunschweig.

This interior was no longer fixed with the classic three nails that ran along the helmet shell but by a screw placed inside, in the centre of the upper part of the helmet.

For this reason the helmet is recognizable from the previous versions by the absence of the rivets on the shell. In later versions, the ventilation holes were also removed. As regards to the fastening of the chinstrap, were used the same solutions of the previous model.

==== M56 and M1A1 ====
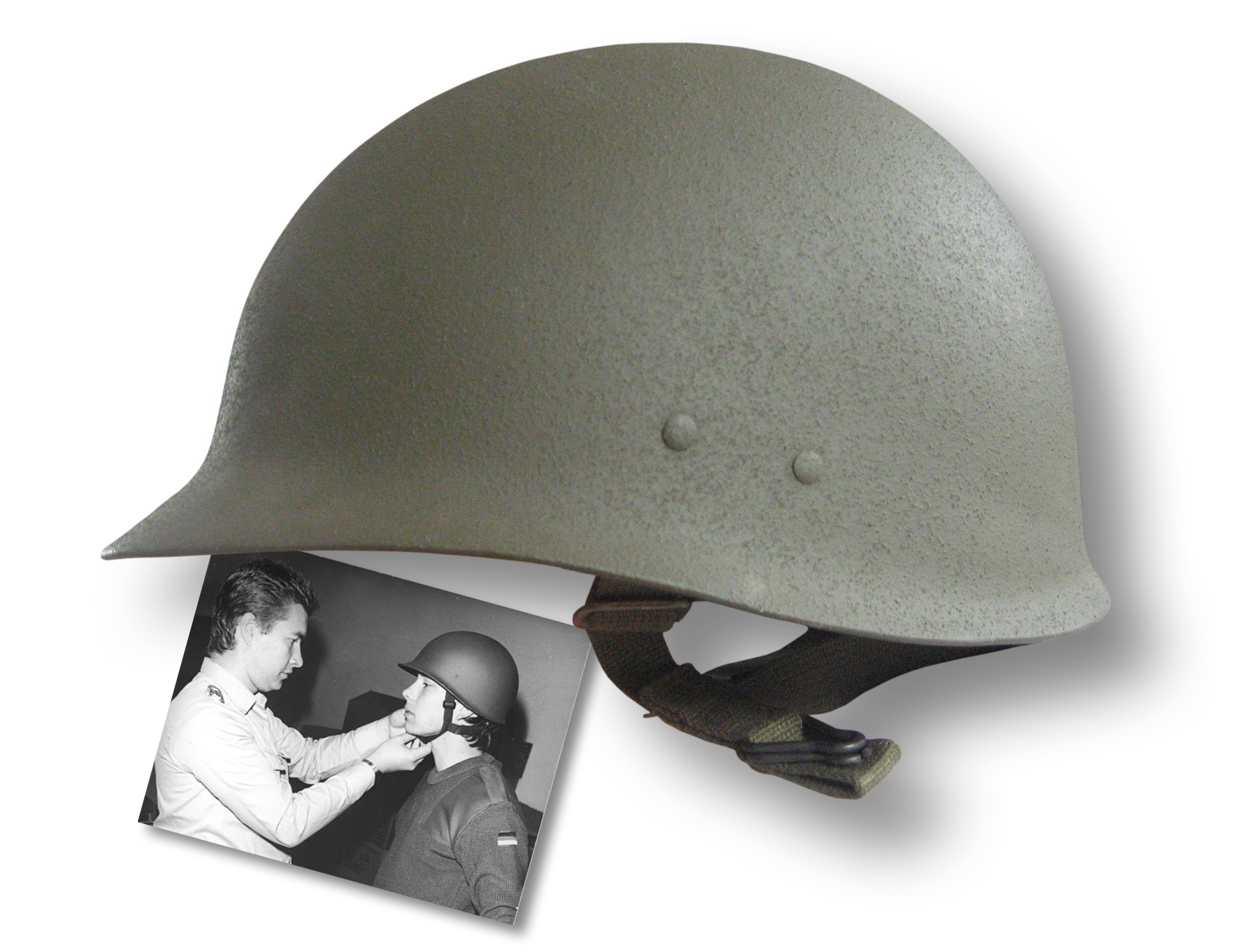
Helm M1A1, as it was worn in a similar form since 1956. Its retirement began in 1992.

The West German M-56 Stahlhelm was a direct copy of the U.S. M1 helmet. It was properly called "zweiteiliger Stahlhelm" (two-piece steel helmet). In 1958 the helmet was made as a one-piece helmet and renamed Stahlhelm M1A1. The M1A1 came in three sizes: 66, 68, and 71. This helmet was used until 1981 when a modified version was released and renamed the Helm1A1. Modifications included a 3-point chin strap with the third point connecting at the nape, extra-large sizes, and a further adjustable liner.

The M1A1 Stahlhelm remained in service until 1992 when the Bundeswehr replaced it with a PASGT-derived kevlar helmet called the Gefechtshelm ("Combat helmet").

== Decals and insignia ==
After Stahlhelm shells were painted, the colours of which varied by organization, small identification or insignia decals usually were affixed to one or both sides of the helmet. Almost every military, naval, and political organization had its own distinctive insignia, which was applied as decals to the sides of helmets. The right side of early M35 helmets bore the tricolored shield of black, white, and red stripes, the traditional national colors of the pre-World War I German Empire (cf. the black, red, and gold of today's Federal Republic of Germany, hearkening back to the 1848 Revolt). The left side of the shell often received decal insignia denoting the branch of the armed forces, or Wehrmacht, or an organization within the Nazi Party.

The combined Wehrmacht military forces of Nazi Germany consisted of the Heer (army), the Kriegsmarine (navy), and the Luftwaffe (air force). While not technically part of the Wehrmacht, the Waffen-SS ("Armed-SS") tactically operated as such and was considered part of Germany's armed forces during the war. The same was true of some Sturmabteilung (SA) units, along with other subsidiary organizations, which functioned as part of the armed forces particularly towards the end of the war. Wehrmacht branches typically displayed distinctive emblems in the form of decals on their helmets. The Heer, or army, displayed a black shield bearing the frontal view of a silver-coloured German eagle holding a swastika in its talons (known as the Reichsadler), while the navy used the same eagle emblem in gold. Luftwaffe decals displayed the side view of an eagle in flight, also holding a swastika. The SS was both a paramilitary and a political organization, and its black runic initials on a silver-coloured shield (normally applied to the right side of the shell) looked like twin lightning bolts. Other military, political, and civil or defence organizations used similar decal insignia to distinguish their helmets. Such visible identification devices were gradually abandoned as the war progressed, however, so that by war's end most Wehrmacht helmet insignia had been eliminated to reduce the wearer's visibility in combat.

For the Chinese Nationalist Army soldiers, their M35 helmets were stencilled with the Chinese Nationalist Insignia on the left side. Bolivian Army personnel carry the national flag and Wiphala decals on their Stahlhelms when in the full dress.

== Users ==
- Kingdom of Afghanistan: M18 Hungarian model, purchased from Czechoslovakia in the 1930s
- Argentina: A hardboard local made helmet called M38 was used between 1938 and 1956.
- Austria-Hungary: M17
- Belgium
- Bolivia
- Bulgaria: M16-18 used in WW1; the Bulgarian M36 helmet used in WW2 was derived from it.
- People's State of Bavaria: M18 stolen from Germans.
  - Bavarian Soviet Republic
- Ba'athist Syria: Used the Gerät 605
- Cambodia
- Chile
- Republic of China (1912–1949) − M35
- People's Republic of China − M35, Captured from the Nationalists
- Colombia
- Croatia − M56.
  - Independent State of Croatia
- Cuba − Seen worn on sappers auxiliaries and supplied by Czechoslovakia
- Czechoslovakia − Used German or Austro-Hungarian M16/M17s until the early 1920s, when they were replaced by the M22, a domestic design
- Dominican Republic
- Estonia: M16 and M18.
- Finland
- Georgia: Seen worn by Gamsakhurdia's forces during the Georgian Civil War
- Germany
  - German Empire − M16-18
  - Weimar Republic
  - Nazi Germany: M35~M42
  - East Germany: M56
  - West Germany: Copies of M35, for Bundesgrenzschutz use.
- Greece: Limited use by ELAS.
- Guyana: Used the Gerät 605
- Hungary
- Imperial State of Iran
- Irish Free State: Used 1926−1940
- Italy
- Latvia: M16, M1918
- Kingdom of Libya
- Lithuania: M1918
- Mexico: Limited use of M1916, replaced by M26 Adrian Helmets in 1938)
- Norway: Used by the Norwegian Armed Forces from 1945 until the introduction of the American M1 helmet in the late 1950s.
- Ottoman Empire: M18
- Ukrainian People's Republic: M18
- Poland: Interwar Polish state issued WW1 stahlhelms to Border Protection Corps, 10th Motorized Cavalry Brigade, and state police units. During the World War II helmets captured from the German occupying force were used by Polish underground formations.
- (Russia) Russian White movement − supplied by Germany to West Russian Volunteer Army troops in the Russian Civil War.
- Sweden: (Försökshjälm Modell B. A variant to the M1926)
- Spain
- Russian SFSR: M18 stolen from Germans or supplied by Soviet Bavaria used in the Russian Civil War.
- Tunisia: Used by National Guard in 60s and spotted in Battle of Ben Guerdane. Picture of a Tunisian national guard officer wearing a Stahlhelm
- Turkey: M56 helmet.
- Venezuela
- Vietnam: M56 East German helmet
- People's Republic of Mozambique - East German M56 helmet used during the Rhodesian Bush War

== See also ==
- Pickelhaube
- Sallet
- Der Stahlhelm
- Wehrmacht uniforms
- Brodie helmet
- Adrian helmet
- SSh-36
