= Boiled leather =

Historical leather material for various uses

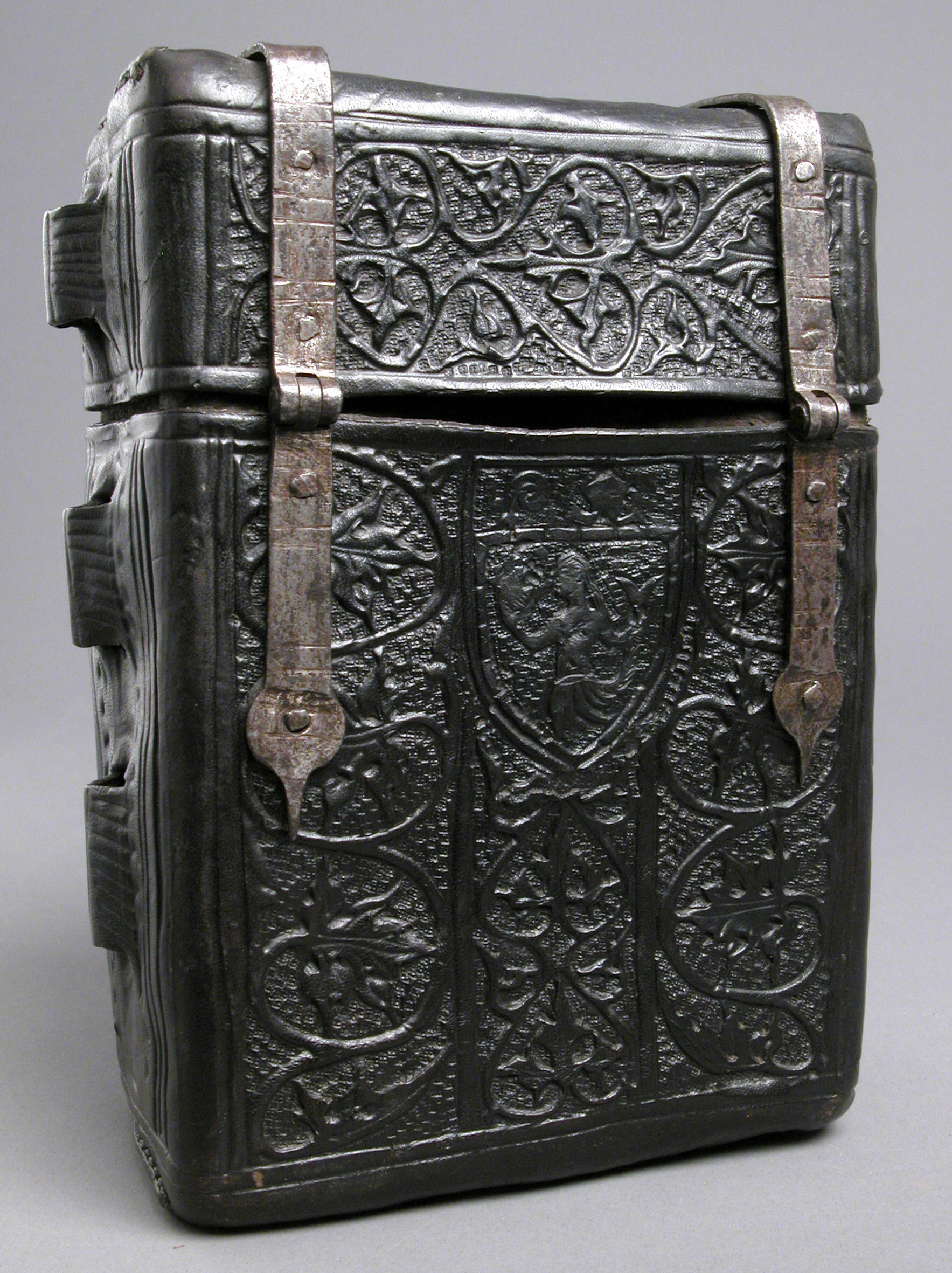
Case for a book, with fittings for a carrying-cord, 15th century. The coat of arms (on the other side) suggests it was made for a bishop.

Boiled leather, often referred to by its French translation, cuir bouilli (French: [kɥiʁ buji]), was a historical material common in the Middle Ages and Early Modern Period and used for various purposes. It was leather that had been treated so that it became tough and rigid, as well as able to hold moulded decoration. It was the usual material for the robust carrying-cases that were made for important pieces of metalwork, instruments such as astrolabes, personal sets of cutlery, books, pens and the like. It was used for some armour, being both much cheaper and much lighter than plate armour, but could not withstand a direct blow from a blade, nor a gunshot.

Alternative names are "moulded leather" and "hardened leather". In the course of making the material it becomes very soft, and can be impressed into a mould to give it the desired shape and decoration, which most surviving examples have. Pieces such as chests and coffers also usually have a wooden inner core.

Various recipes for making cuir bouilli survive, and do not agree with each other; probably there were a range of recipes, partly reflecting different final uses. Vegetable-tanned leather is generally specified. Scholars have debated the subject at length and attempted to recreate the historical material. Many, but not all, sources agree that the process involved immersion of the leather in water, but not actual boiling.

== Military use ==
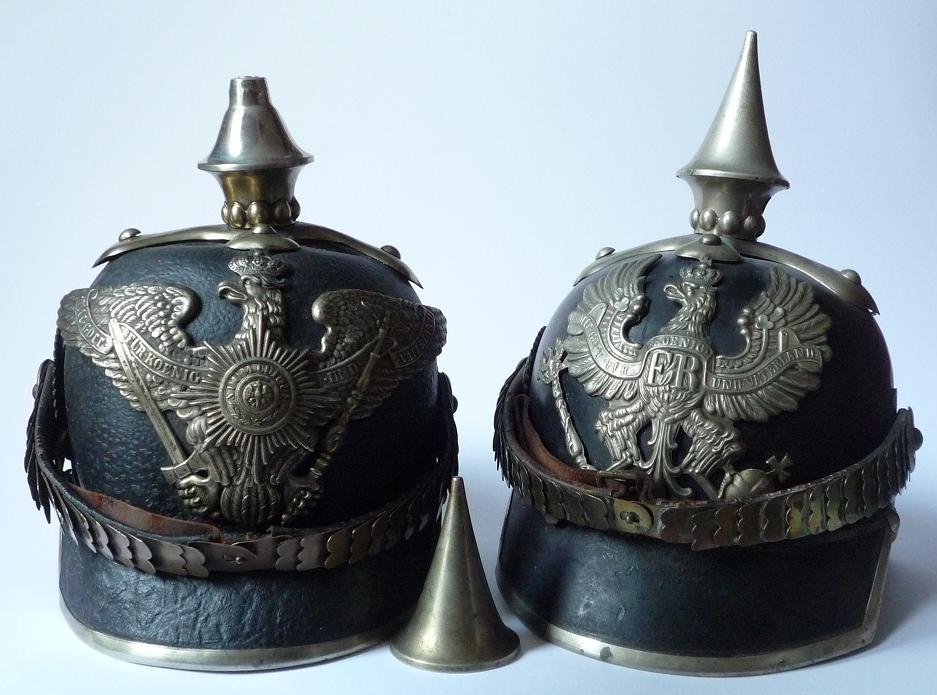
German pickelhaube, c. 1860

Cuir bouilli was used for cheap and light armour, although it was much less effective than plate armour, which was heavier and more expensive. However, cuir bouilli could be reinforced against slashing blows by the addition of metal bands or strips, especially in helmets. Modern experiments on simple cuir bouilli have shown that it can reduce the depth of an arrow wound considerably, especially if coated with a crushed mineral facing mixed with glue, as one medieval Arab author recommended.

In addition, "armour based on hide has the unique advantage that it can, in extremis, provide some nutrition" when actually boiled. Josephus records that the Jewish defenders in the Siege of Jerusalem in AD 70 were reduced to eating their shields and other leather kit, as was the Spanish expedition of Tristan de Luna in 1559.

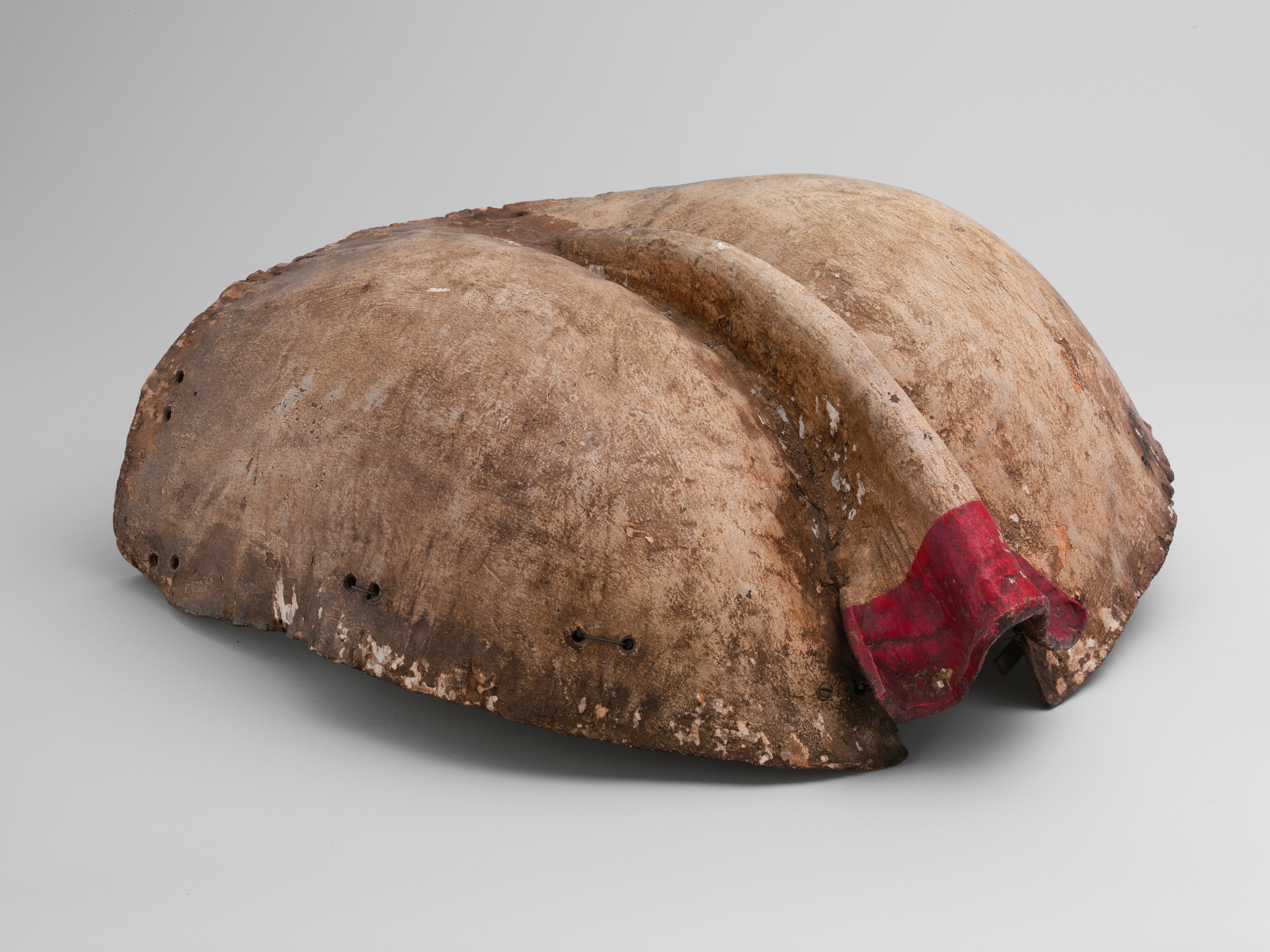
Crupper plate for horse armour, 16th century, north Europe

Versions of cuir bouilli were used since ancient times, especially for shields, in many parts of the world. Although in general leather does not survive long burial, and excavated archaeological evidence for it is rare, an Irish shield of cuir bouilli with wooden formers, deposited in a peat bog, has survived for some 2,500 years. It was commonly used in the Western world for helmets; the pickelhaube, the standard German helmet, was not replaced by a steel stahlhelm until 1916, in the midst of World War I. As leather does not conduct heat the way metal does, firemen continued to use boiled leather helmets until World War II, and the invention of strong plastics.

The word cuirass for a breastplate indicates that these were originally made of leather. In the Late Middle Ages, the heyday of plate armour, cuir bouilli continued to be used even by the rich for horse armour and often for tournament armour, as well as by ordinary infantry soldiers. Tournaments were increasingly regulated in order to reduce the risk to life, and in 1278 Edward I of England organized one in Windsor Great Park at which cuir bouilli armour was worn, and the king provided swords made of whale bone and parchment.

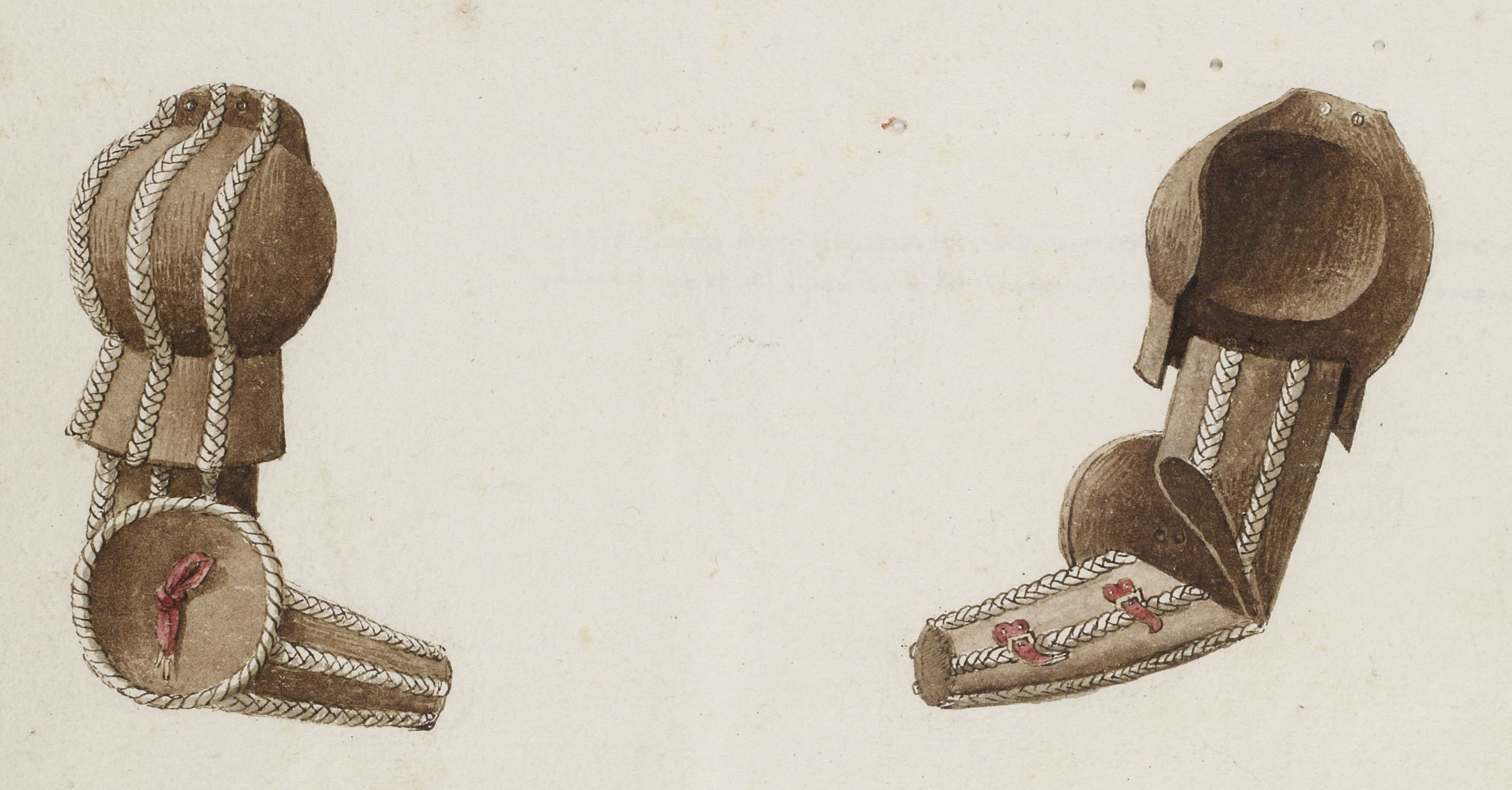
Design for cuir bouilli armour for tournaments, from Le Livre des tournois, 1460s

The account of the Battle of Agincourt in 1415 by Jean de Wavrin, who was present on the French side, describes the crucial force of English longbowmen as having on their heads either cuir bouilli helmets, or wicker with iron strips, or nothing (the last, he says, were also barefoot).

A few pieces of Roman horse armour in cuir bouilli have been excavated. Evidence from documents such as inventories show that it was common in the late Middle Ages and Renaissance, and used by the highest ranks, but survivals are very few. In 1547 the Master of Armoury in the Tower of London ordered 46 sets of bards and crinets in preparation for the final invasion of Scotland in the war known as the Rough Wooing. In September that year the English cavalry were crucial in the decisive victory at the Battle of Pinkie Cleugh. The German Count Palatine of the Rhine had six sets of cuir bouilli horse armour for his and his family's use in the 16th century. Often the shaffron for the horse's head would be in steel, though leather ones are also known.

Cuir bouilli was also very common for scabbards. However surviving specimens of leather armour are rare, more so than the various types of civilian containers. It is believed that many leather pieces are depicted in sculpted tomb monuments, where they are more highly decorated than metal pieces would have been. Cuir bouilli was also often used for elaborate figurative crests on some helmets.

The material is mentioned in Froissart's Chronicles of the Hundred Years' War, and Geoffrey Chaucer, in his Canterbury Tales, written in the late 1300s, says of the knight Sir Thopas:

Hise jambeux were of quyrboilly,
His swerdes shethe of yvory,
His helm of laton bright,
His sadel was of rewel-boon,
His brydel as the sonne shoon,
Or as the moone light.

Jambeux (from French jambe, 'leg'), modern French spelling jambeaux, means greaves, shin-plates; latten is a decorative copper alloy, such as bronze or brass; rewel-bone is another word for ivory, probably from a walrus.

The large decorative crests that came to top some helmets in the late Middle Ages were often made of cuir bouilli, as is the famous example belonging to the Black Prince and hung with other "achievements" over his tomb in Canterbury Cathedral. His wooden shield also has the heraldic animals appliqued in cuir bouilli.

== Examples of other uses ==
As well as the crests on helmets described above, cuir bouilli was probably used sculpturally in various contexts, over a wood or plaster framework where necessary. When Henry V of England died in France, his effigy in cuir bouilli was placed on top of his coffin for the journey back to England.

A near life-size crucifix in the Vatican Museums is in cuir bouilli over wood. This is of special interest to art historians because it was made in 1540 as a replica of a crucifix in silver presented by Charlemagne some 740 years before; an object of great interest as possibly the first of the long line of monumental crucifixes in Western art. In 1540, the original silver was melted down for church plate to replace that looted in the Sack of Rome in 1527. It seems likely that the leather was moulded directly from the original and it is possible that the wooden core underneath is actually the Carolingian original, with the leather replacing the sheets of silver originally fitted over the wood.

Cuir bouilli has also been employed to bind books, mainly between the 9th and 14th centuries. Other uses include high boots for especially tough use, which were called "postillion's boots" in England. Another use was for large bottles or jugs called "blackjacks", "bombards", or "costerns". There is an English reference to these from 1373.

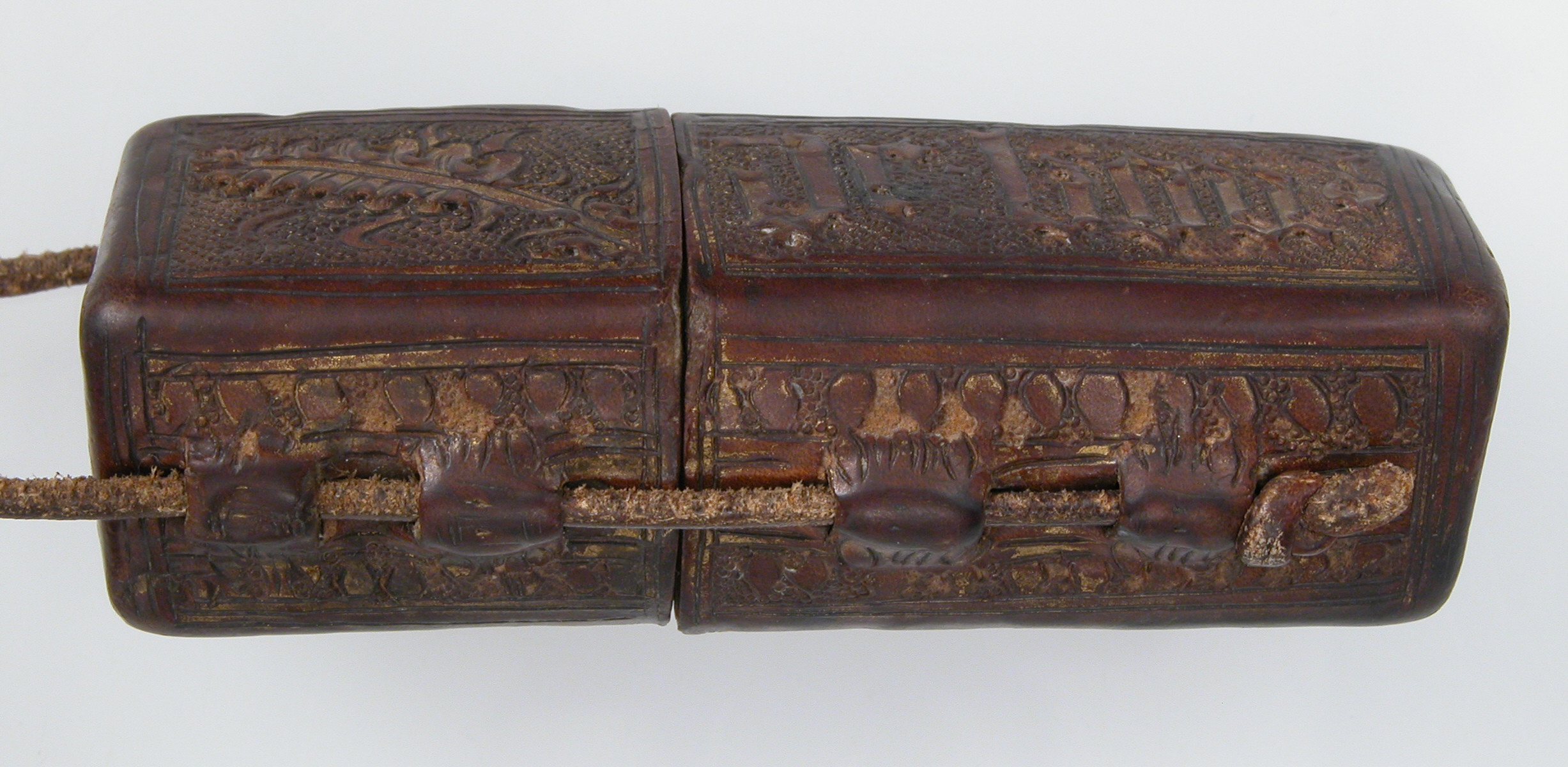
Portable Reliquary Case, French, c. 1400, 12.6 cm long

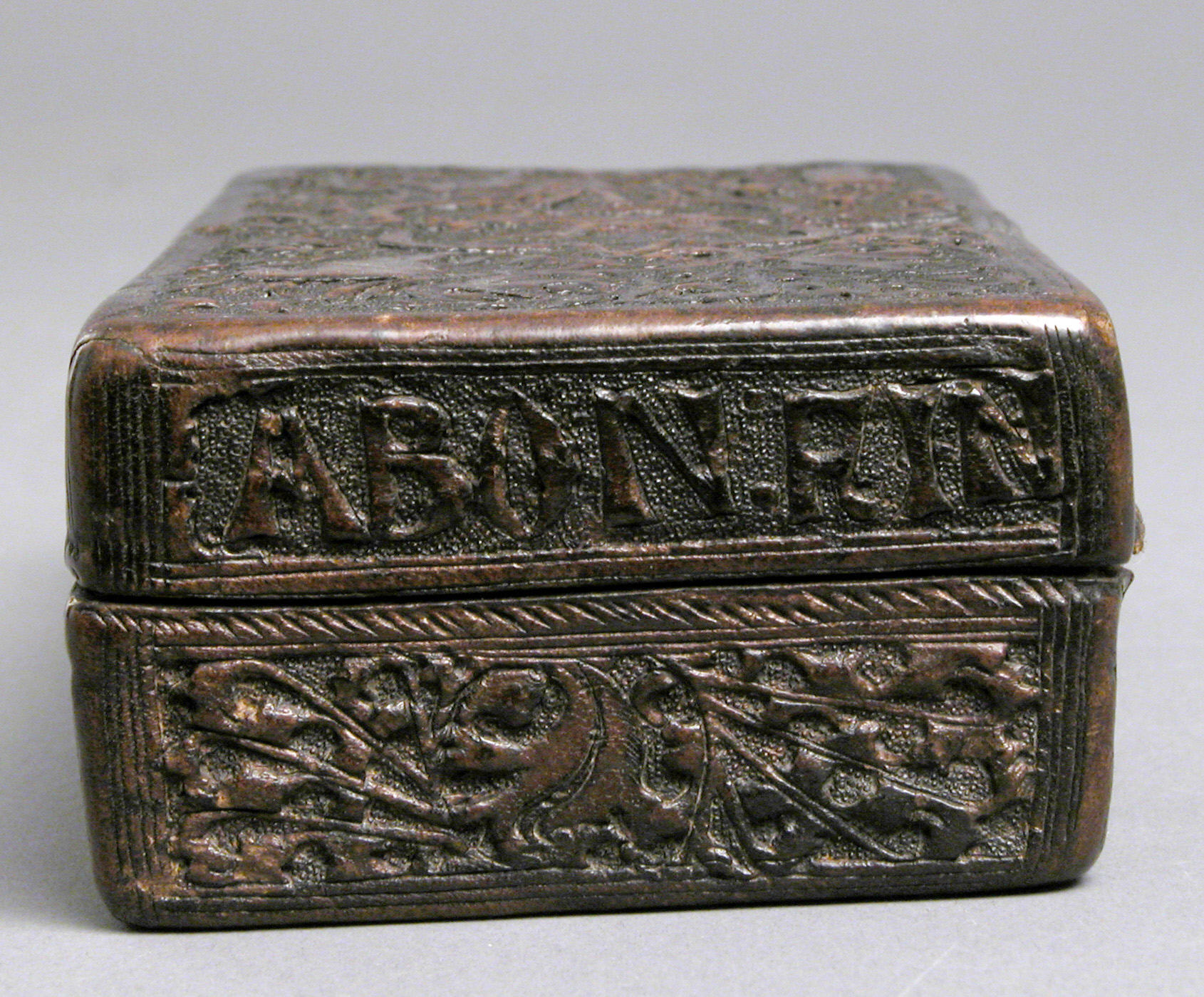
Late 15th-century box, 4 x 12 x 7.4 cm, Italian. The interior is painted.

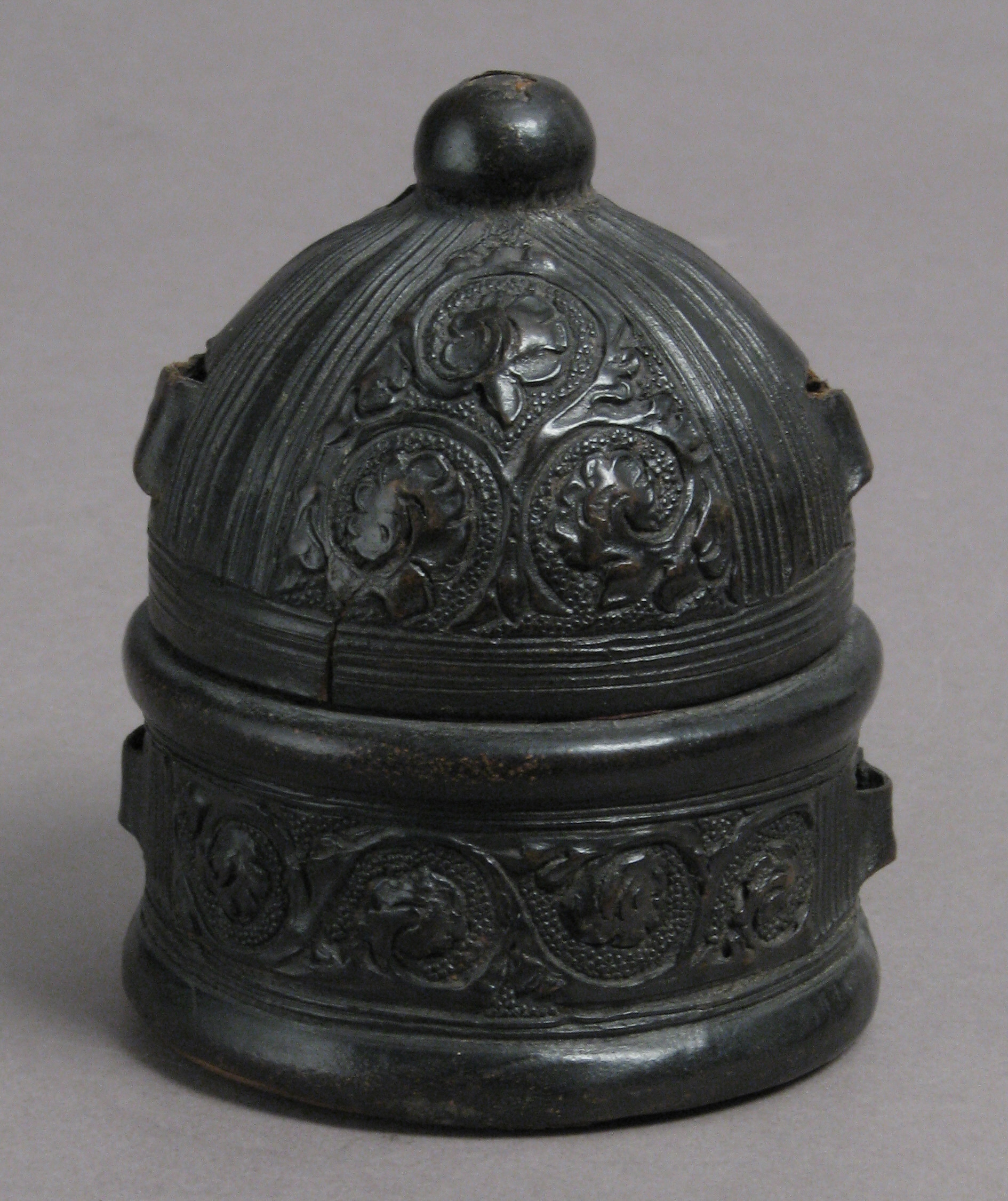
Box, probably for ink powder, 15th-century Italian, textile interior and wood core

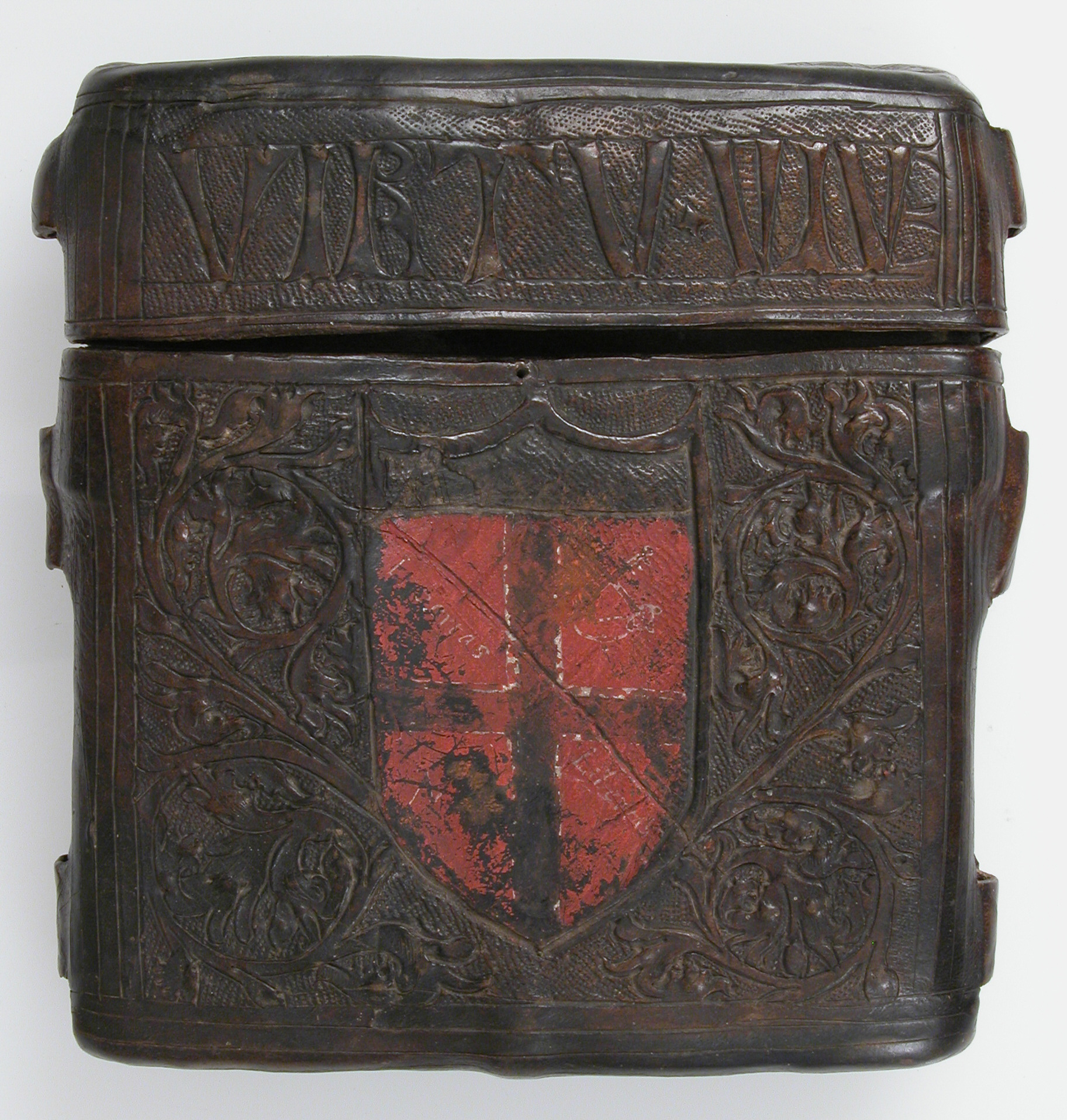
Book case, 15th-century Italian

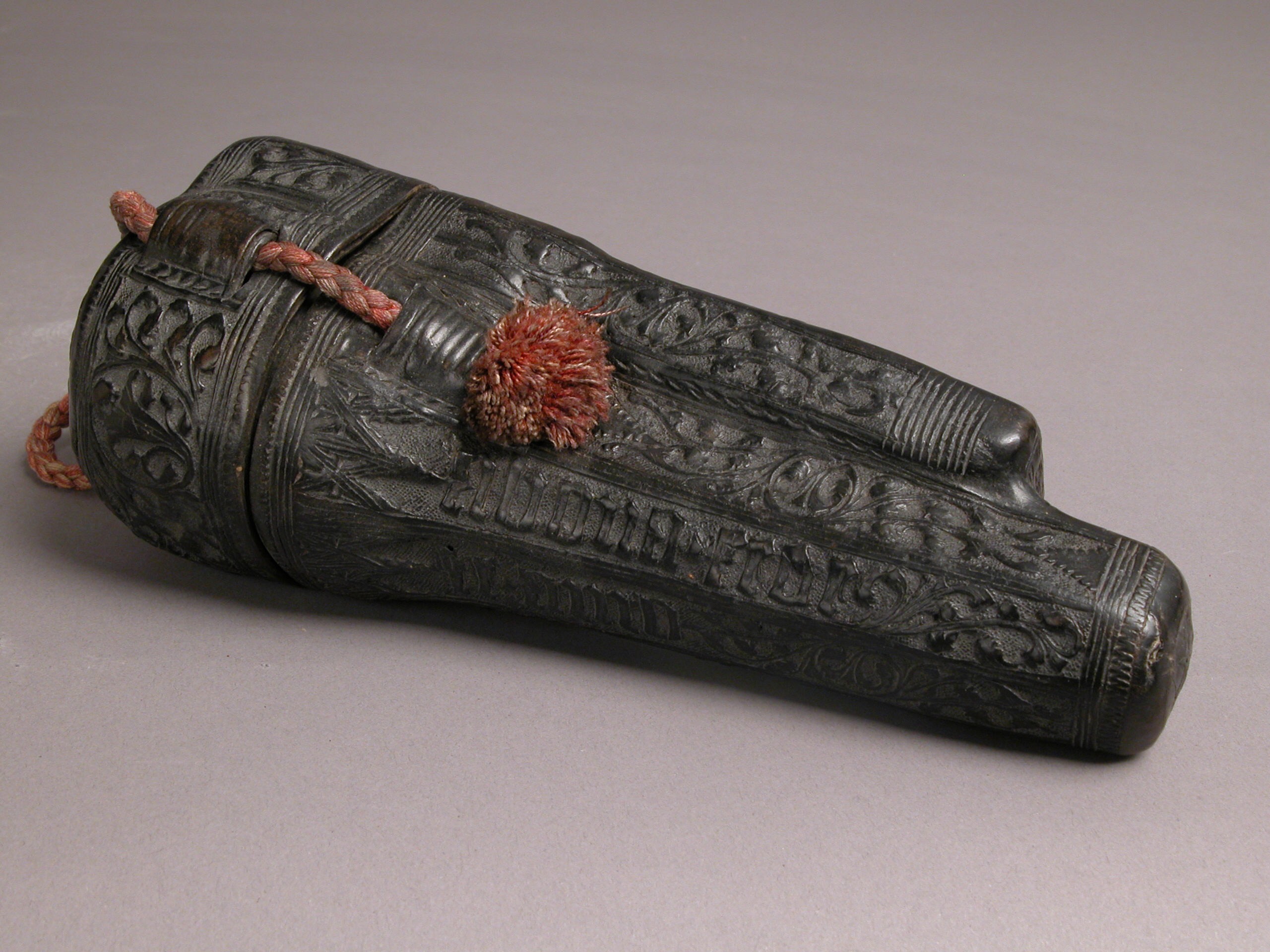
Etui "with an amorous inscription", 1450–1500, Italian, 21 cm long

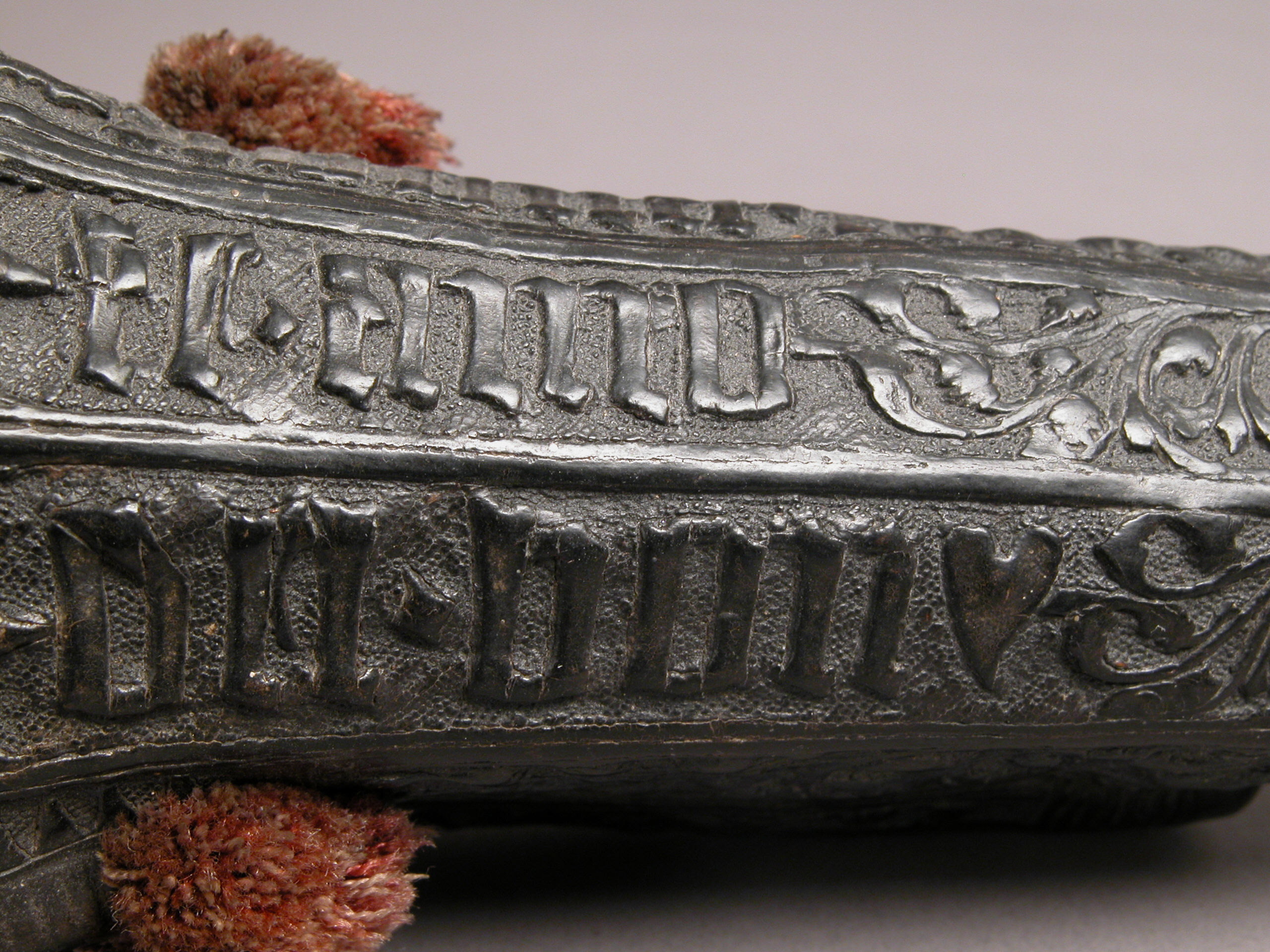
Detail of last. This piece has a wooden core.

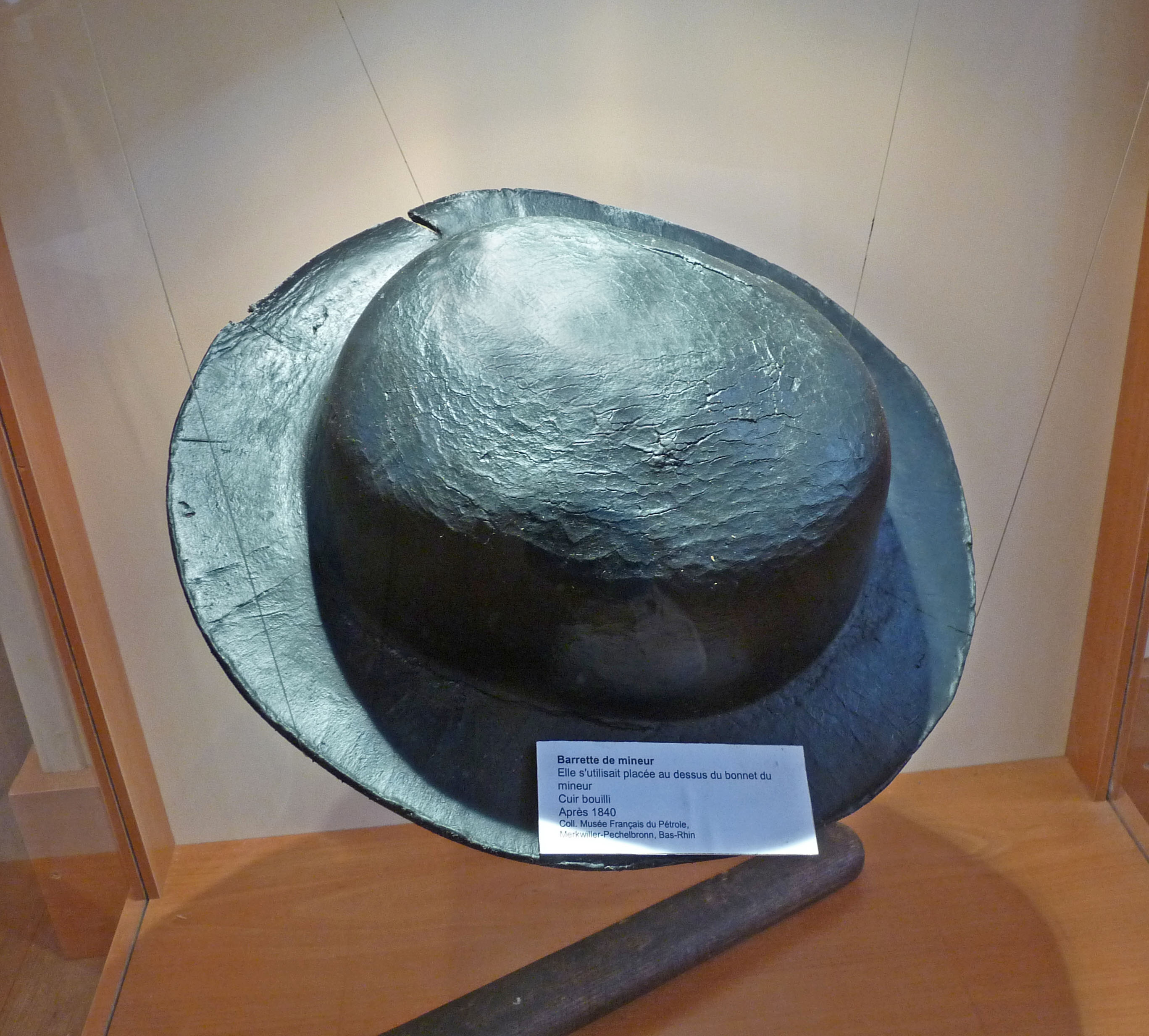
French miner's hat, after 1840

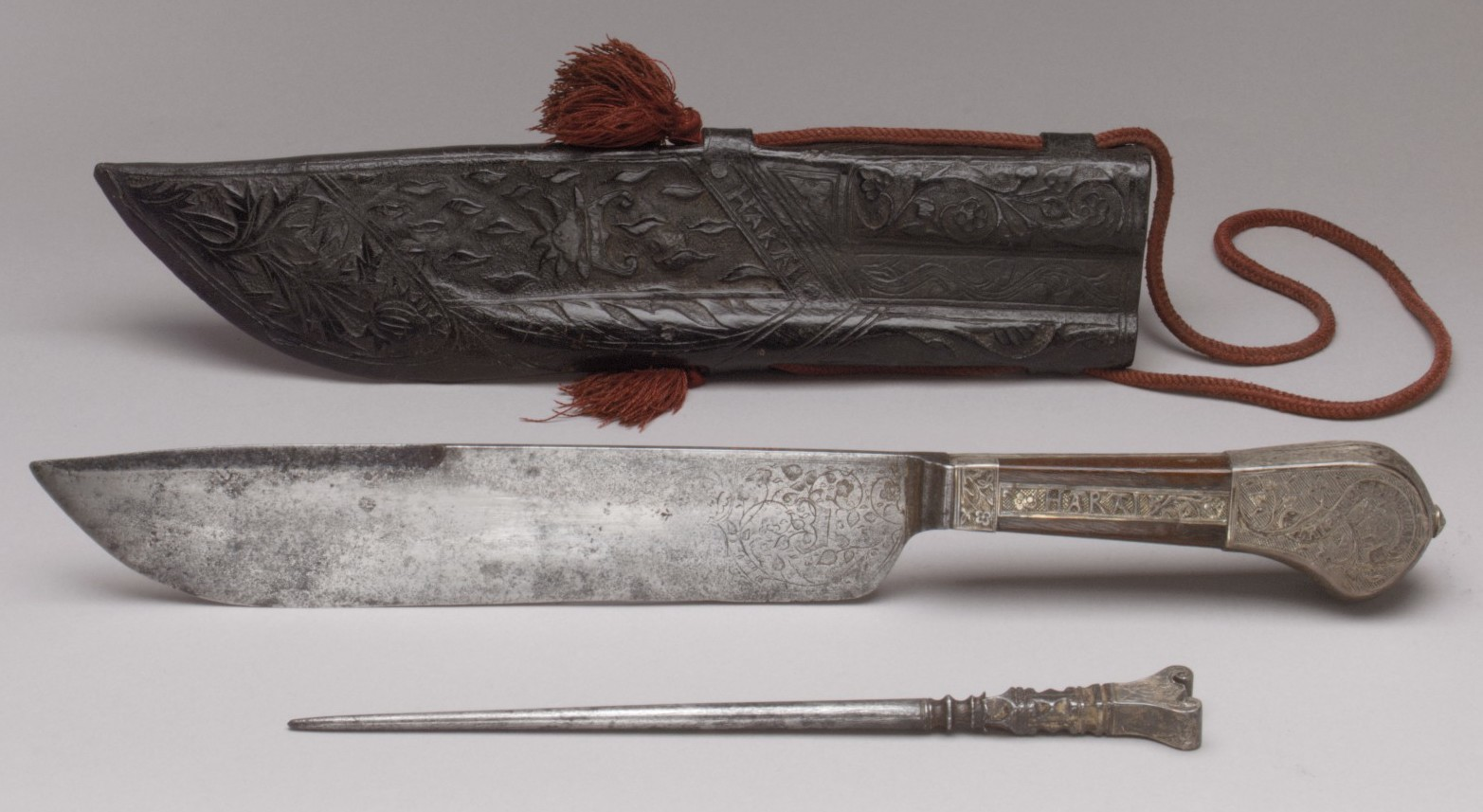
Hunting Knife, Sharpener, and Sheath. French, c. 1880, as a fake 15th-century set.

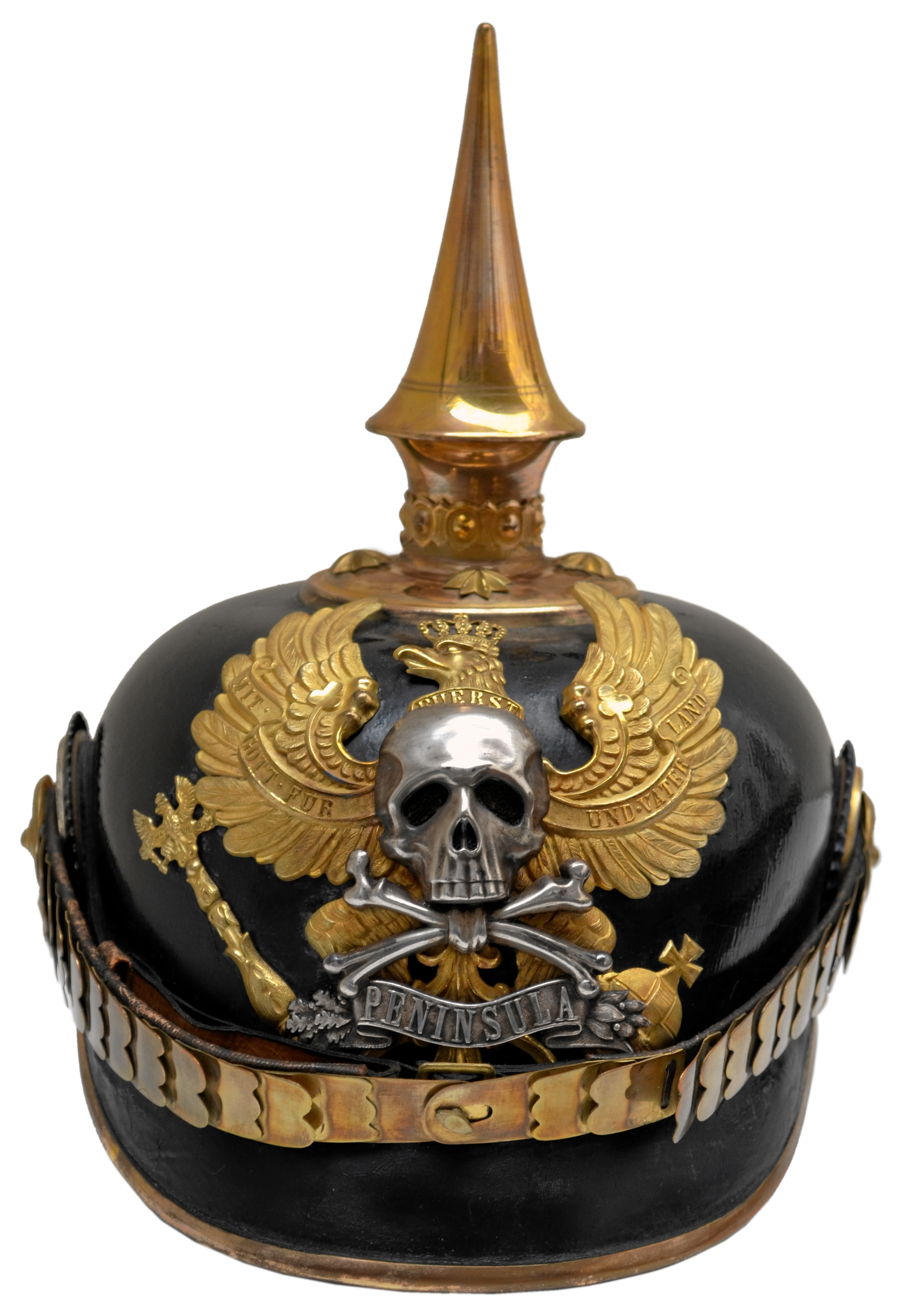
Braunschweigisches Husaren-Regiment Nr. 17, Death's Head pickelhaube

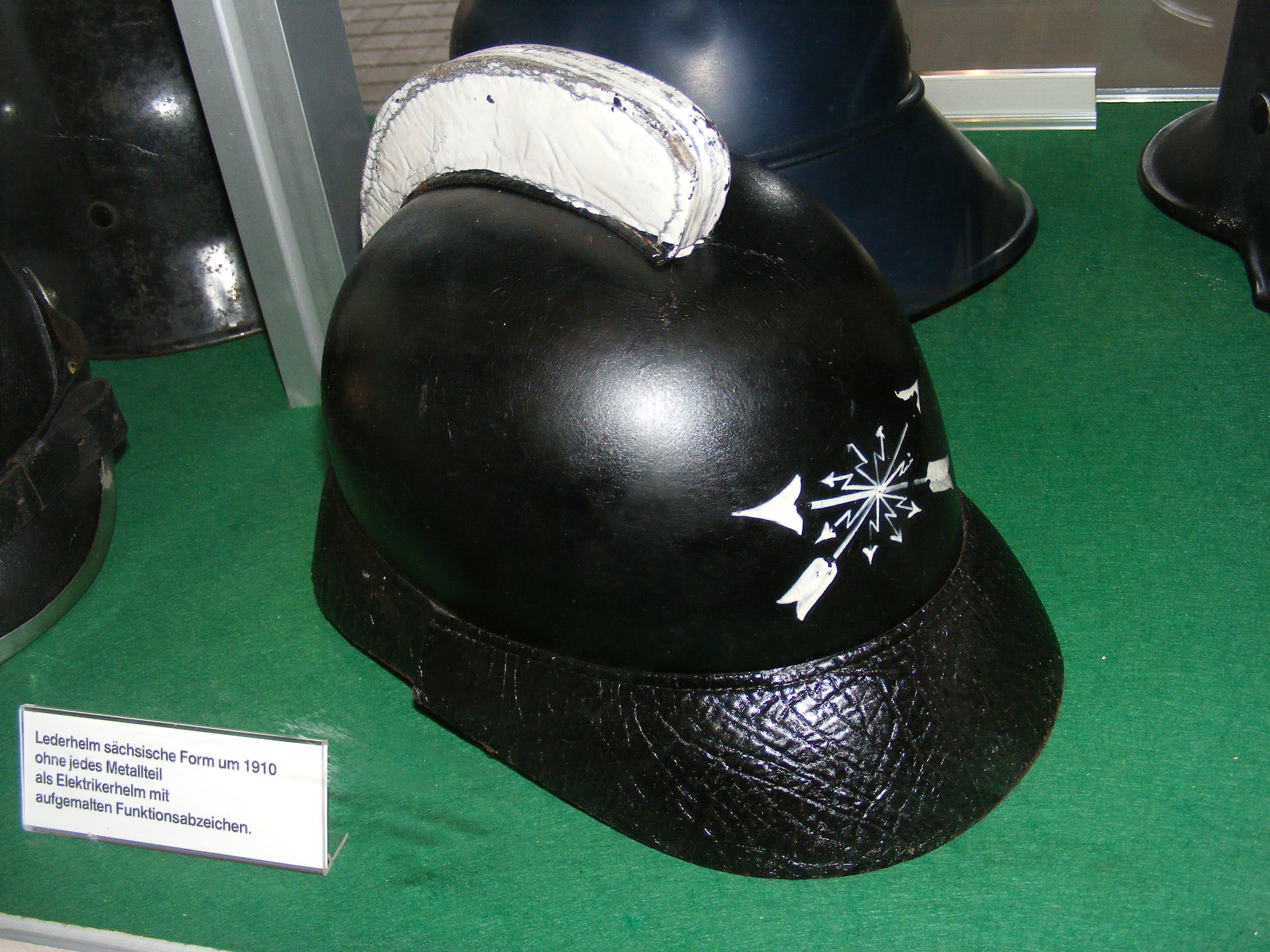
German fireman's helmet (specialist electrician), c. 1910, containing no metal parts at all
