= Harry Ryle Hopps =

American businessman and artist (1869–1937)

Destroy this Mad Brute: Enlist (1917)

Harry Ryle Hopps (1869 – August 24, 1937, Los Angeles) was an American businessman and artist. He was the son of George Hopps and Ann Hopps, both artists. George Hopps was a stage set designer. Harry Ryle Hopps and his brother Bert owned the United Glass Company of San Francisco from c. 1880 to c. 1918. Hopps subsequently moved to Los Angeles, where he worked as an art director on a number of films such as The Thief of Bagdad.

The United Glass Company were responsible for the stained glass at the Cypress Lawn Memorial Park in Colma, California. Hopps designed the recruiting poster Destroy this Mad Brute: Enlist, published in 1917, which shows a gorilla with a Pickelhaube helmet labeled "militarism" holding a bloody club labeled "Kultur" and Lady Liberty topless held captive as he stomps onto the shore of America, illustrating anti-German sentiment in the U.S. during World War I.
