= Tobacco pipe =

Instrument for smoking tobacco or other products

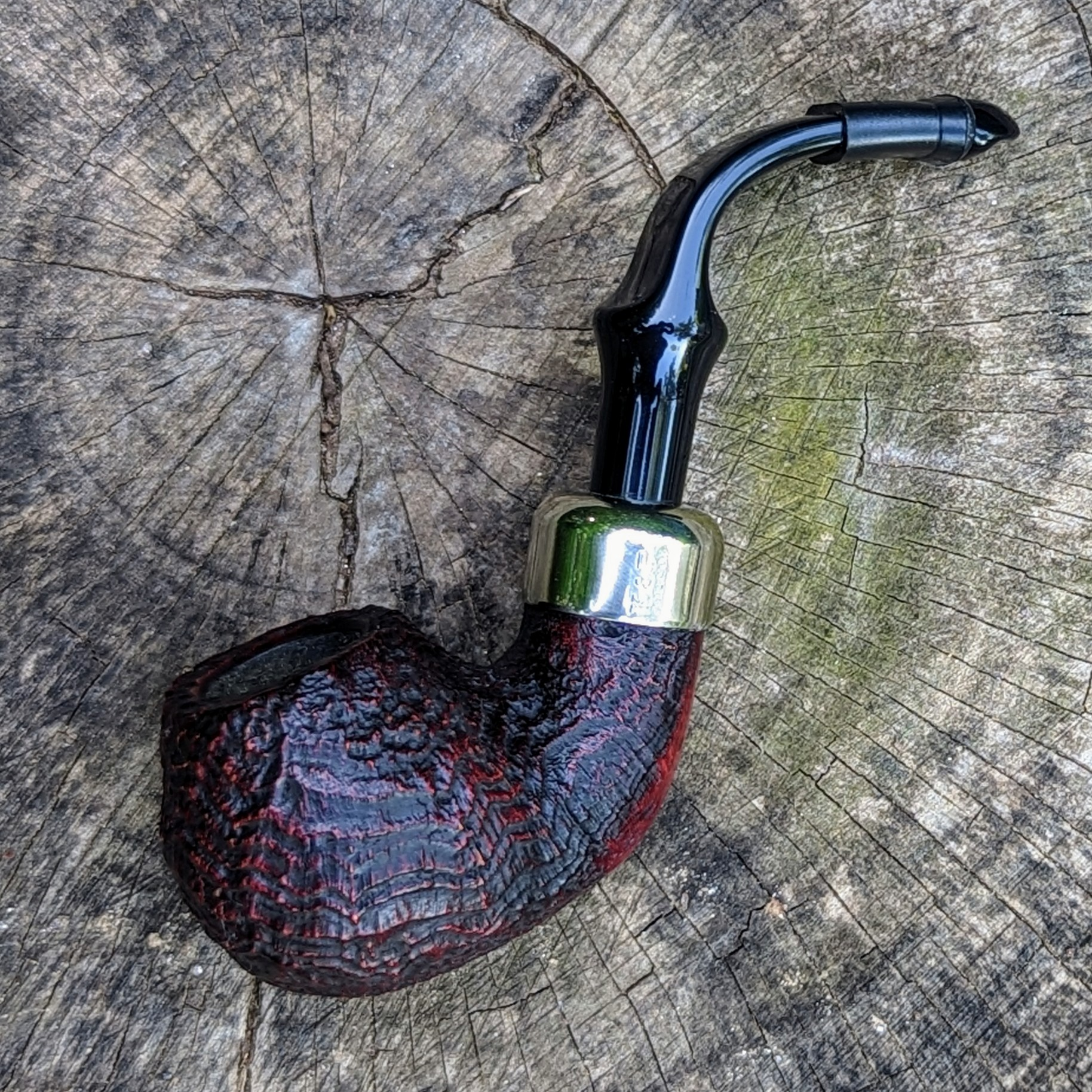
Peterson System Standard Pipe

A tobacco pipe, often called simply a pipe, is a device specifically made to smoke tobacco. It comprises, primarily of a combustion chamber (the bowl) for the tobacco, and a (generally) tapering hollow stem, ending in a mouthpiece to draw air into the bowl and thus smoke to the mouth. Pipes can range from very simple and inexpensive models, to highly prized hand-made artisan pieces by renowned pipe makers around the world. Tobacco pipes are often very expensive and sought after collector's items, both by smokers and non-smokers alike, due to the plethora of styles, history, materials and artistic interpretation bound up in a practical object.

== History ==
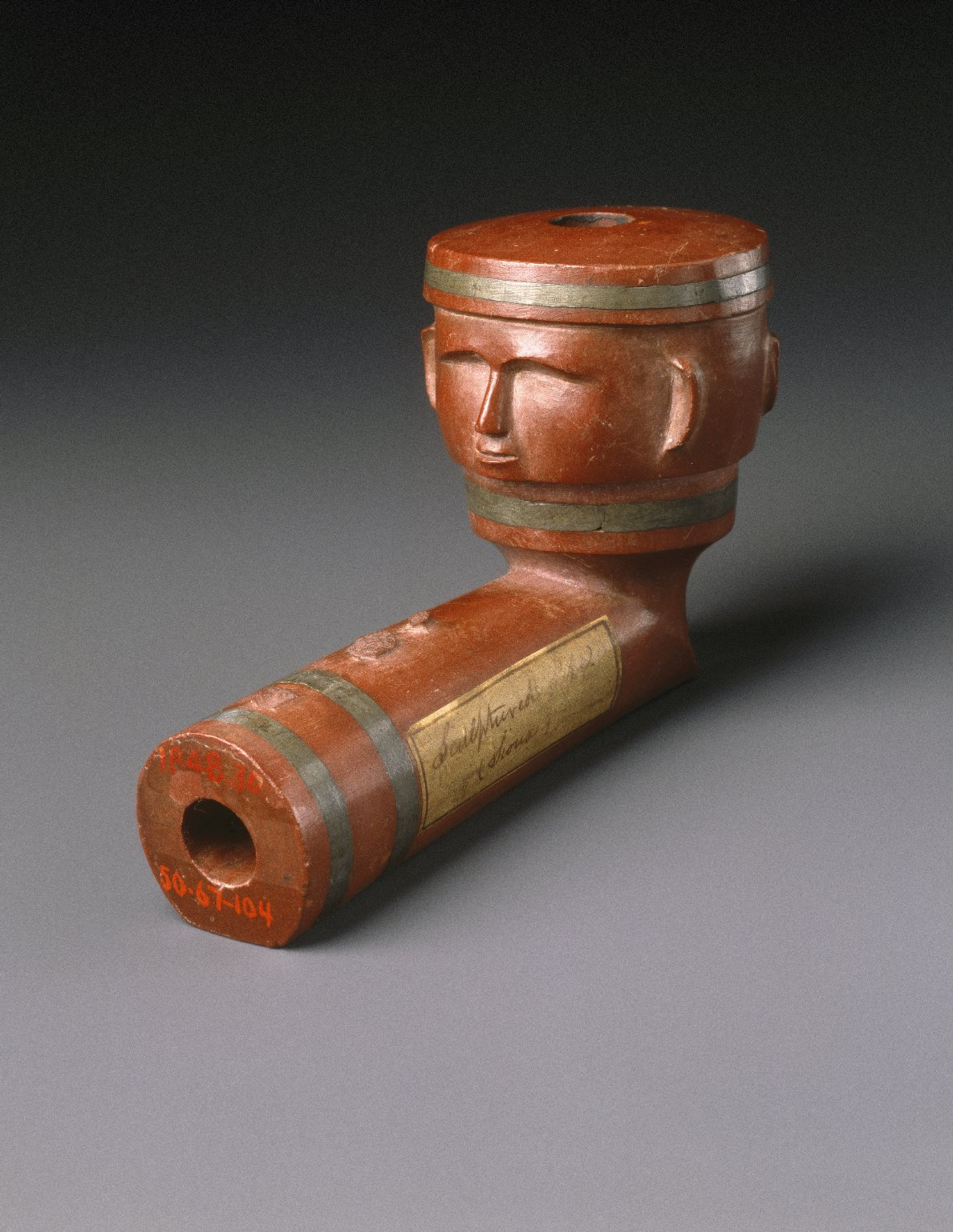
Inlayed Pipe Bowl with Two Faces, early 19th century, Brooklyn Museum

Some cultures of the indigenous peoples of the Americas smoke tobacco in ceremonial pipes, and have done so since long before the arrival of Europeans. For instance the Lakota people use a ceremonial pipe called čhaŋnúŋpa. Other cultures of the indigenous peoples of the Americas smoke tobacco socially. The tobacco plant is native to South America but spread into North America long before Europeans arrived. Tobacco was introduced to Europe from the Americas in the 16th century and spread around the world rapidly.

As tobacco was not introduced to the Old World until the 16th century, the older pipes outside of the Americas were usually used to smoke various other substances.

== Health ==
Epidemiological research has found that tobacco pipe smoking is associated with increased risks of cancers and other diseases. A large U.S. cohort study reported that exclusive pipe smokers had a higher risk of death from a tobacco-linked cancer than non-smokers.

== Principle ==
=== Parts ===
Parts of a pipe include the (1) bowl, (2) chamber, (3) draught hole, (4) shank, (5) mortise, (6) tenon, (7) stem, (8) bit (or mouthpiece), (9) lip, and (10) bore.

The broad anatomy of a tobacco pipe typically comprises mainly the Bowl and the Stem. The Bowl (1) is the part most often held while packing and smoking the pipe On being sucked, the Stem (7) delivers the smoke from the bowl to the user's mouth. Inside the bowl is a space (2) for holding the tobacco, pressed into it. The Draft Hole (3) is the beginning of the Bore (10) which facilitates the air-flow through the pipe. The Shank (4) is often one piece with the bowl, and houses the mortise (5) at its end. The Tenon (6) fitting into the mortise, forms an air-tight, simple connection of the two parts. The Bore stays uniform throughout the Stem, while the outside tapers down to the Mouthpiece or Bit (8), which commonly ends with a lip (9) to facilitate holding with the teeth.

=== Materials ===
The bowls of tobacco pipes are commonly made of briar wood, meerschaum, corncob, pear-wood, rose-wood or clay. Less common materials include other dense-grained woods such as cherry, olive, maple, mesquite, oak, and bog-wood. Minerals such as catlinite and soapstone have also been used. Pipe bowls are sometimes decorated by carving, and moulded clay pipes often had simple decoration in the mould.

Unusual pipe materials include gourds (as in the famous calabash pipe) and pyrolytic graphite. Metal and glass, seldom used for tobacco pipes, are common for pipes intended for other substances, such as cannabis.

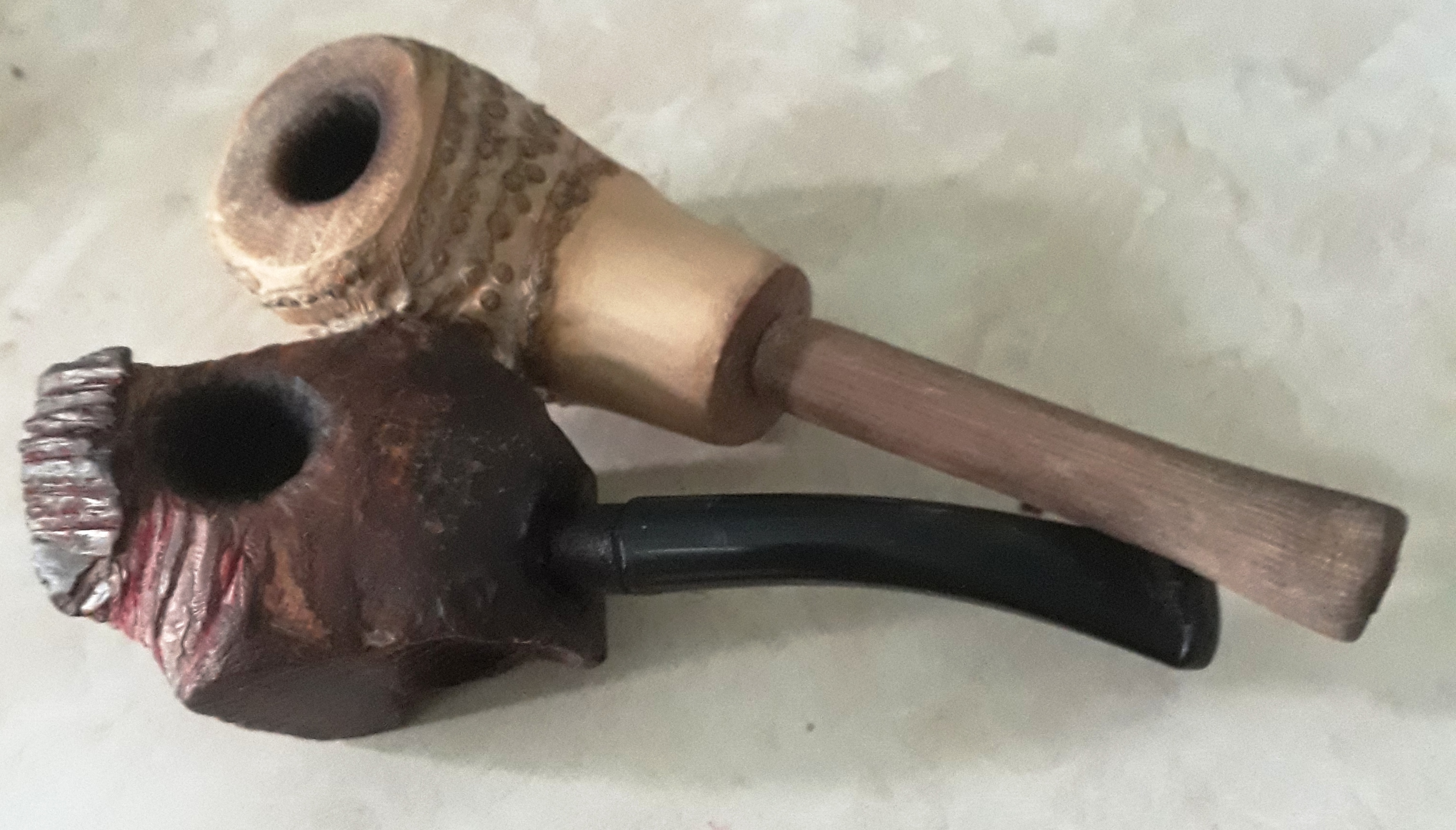
Pipes made of bamboo buds (handmade)

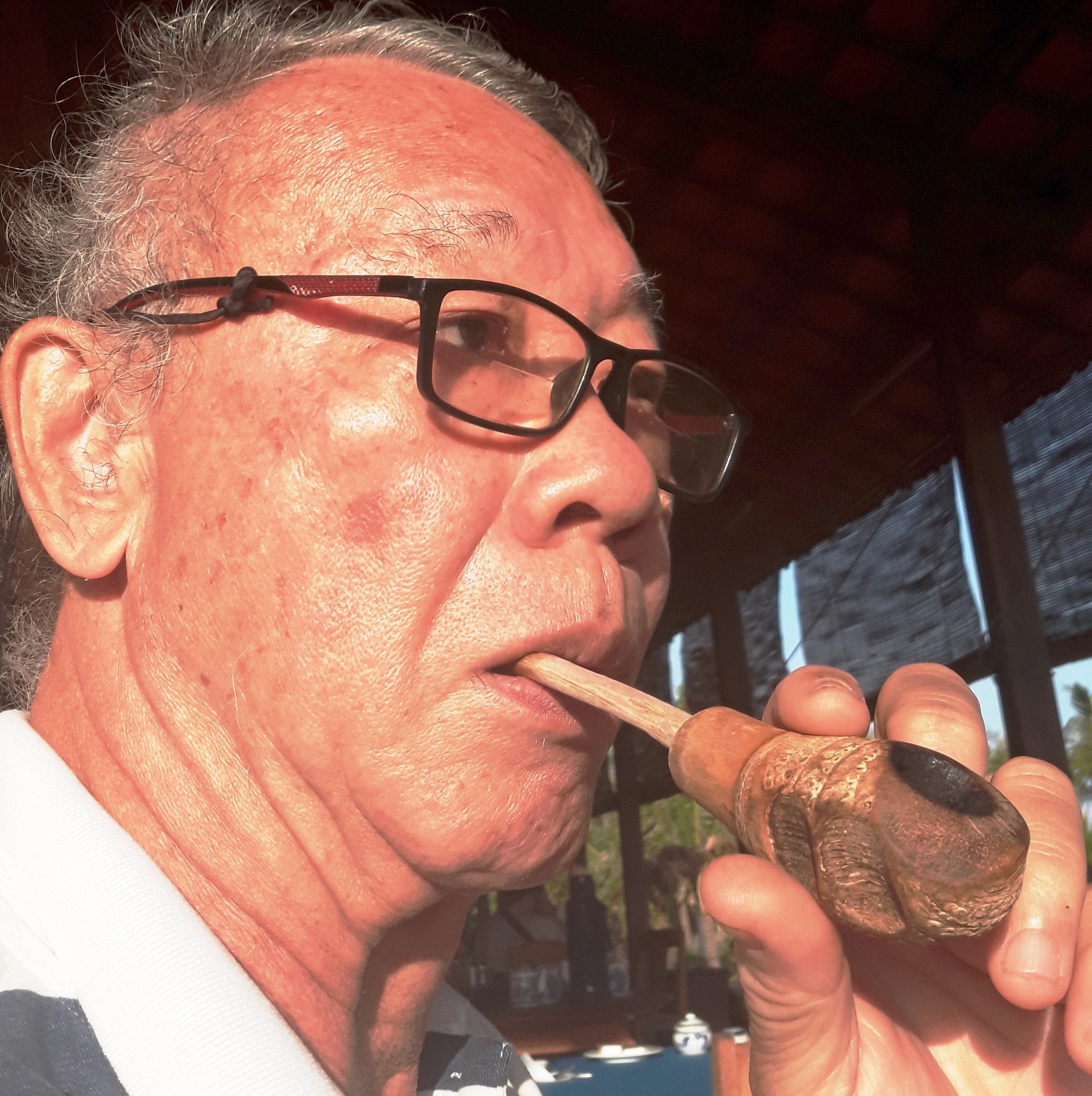
Smoking a bamboo-bud pipe

The stem needs a long channel of constant position and diameter running through it for a proper draw, although filter pipes have varying diameters and can be successfully smoked even without filters or adapters. Because it is molded rather than carved, clay may make up the entire pipe or just the bowl; pipes made of most other materials have stems constructed separately and detachable. Stems and bits of tobacco pipes are usually made of moldable materials like Ebonite, Lucite, Bakelite, or soft plastic. Less common are stems made of reeds, bamboo, or hollowed-out pieces of wood. Expensive pipes once had stems made of amber, though this is rare now.

== Types ==
=== Pipe shapes ===
- Apple. Subtypes: Apple, Author, Diplomat, Egg, Hawkbill, Prince, Tomatoe (Ball).
- Billiard. Subtypes: Billiard, Brandy, Chimney, Panel, Oom Paul, Pot, Nose Warmer.
- Bulldog. Subtypes: Bulldog, Bull Moose, Bullcap, Rhodesian, Ukulele.
- Calabash. Subtypes: Calabash, Reverse Calabash.
- Canadian. Subtypes: Canadian, Liverpool, Lovat, Lumberman.
- Cavalier. Subtypes: Cavalier, Pseudo-cavalier.
- Churchwarden (Reading pipe). – Pipe with a long stem.
- Dublin. Subtypes: Dublin, Acorn (Pear), Cutty, Devil Anse, Zulu.
- Freehand. Subtypes: Freehand, Blowfish, Horn, Nautilus, Tomahawk, Volcano.
- Sitter. Subtypes: Sitter, Cherrywood, Duke (Don), (Stand Up) Poker, Tankard.
- Tyrolean pipe.
- Vest Pocket.
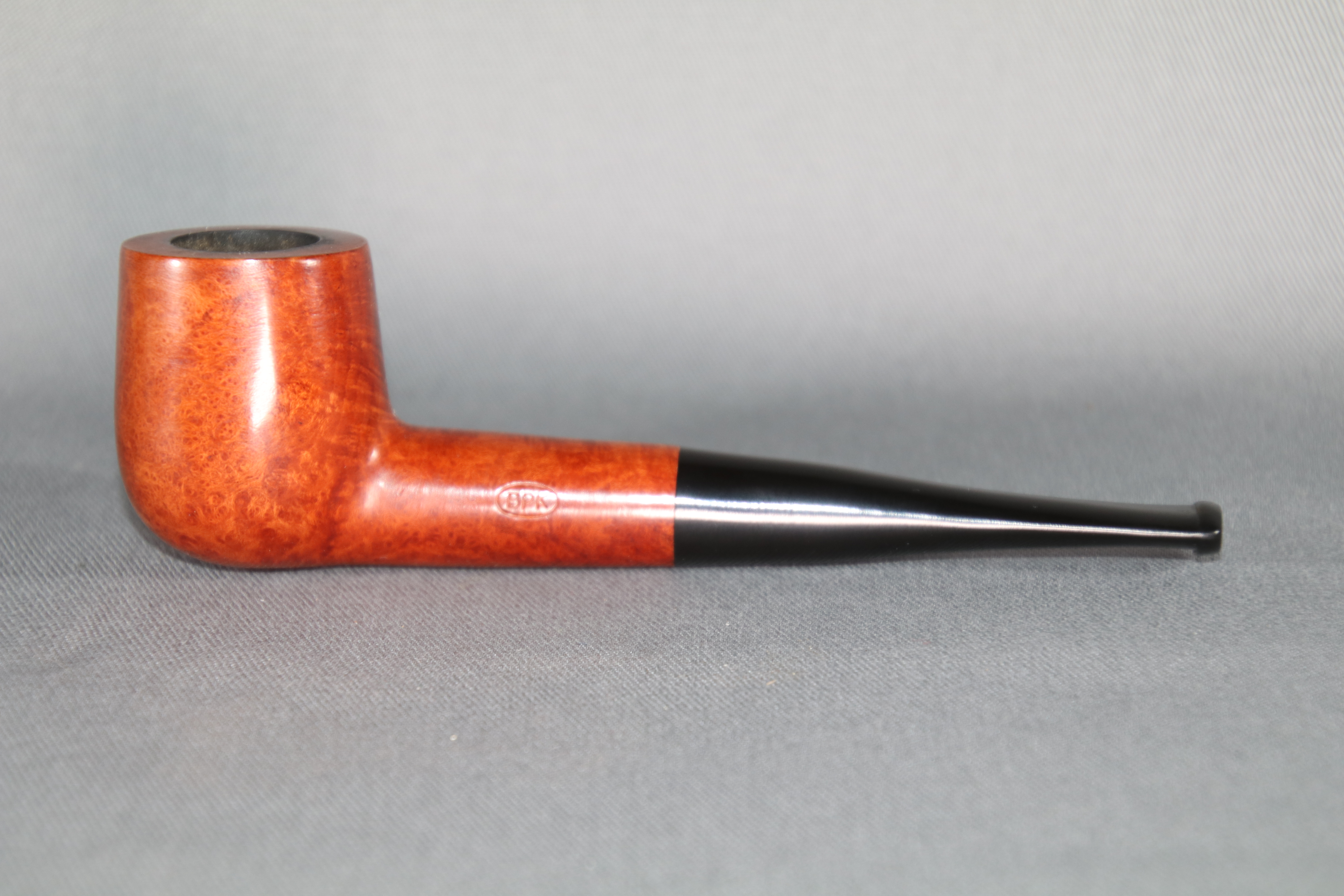
Billiard

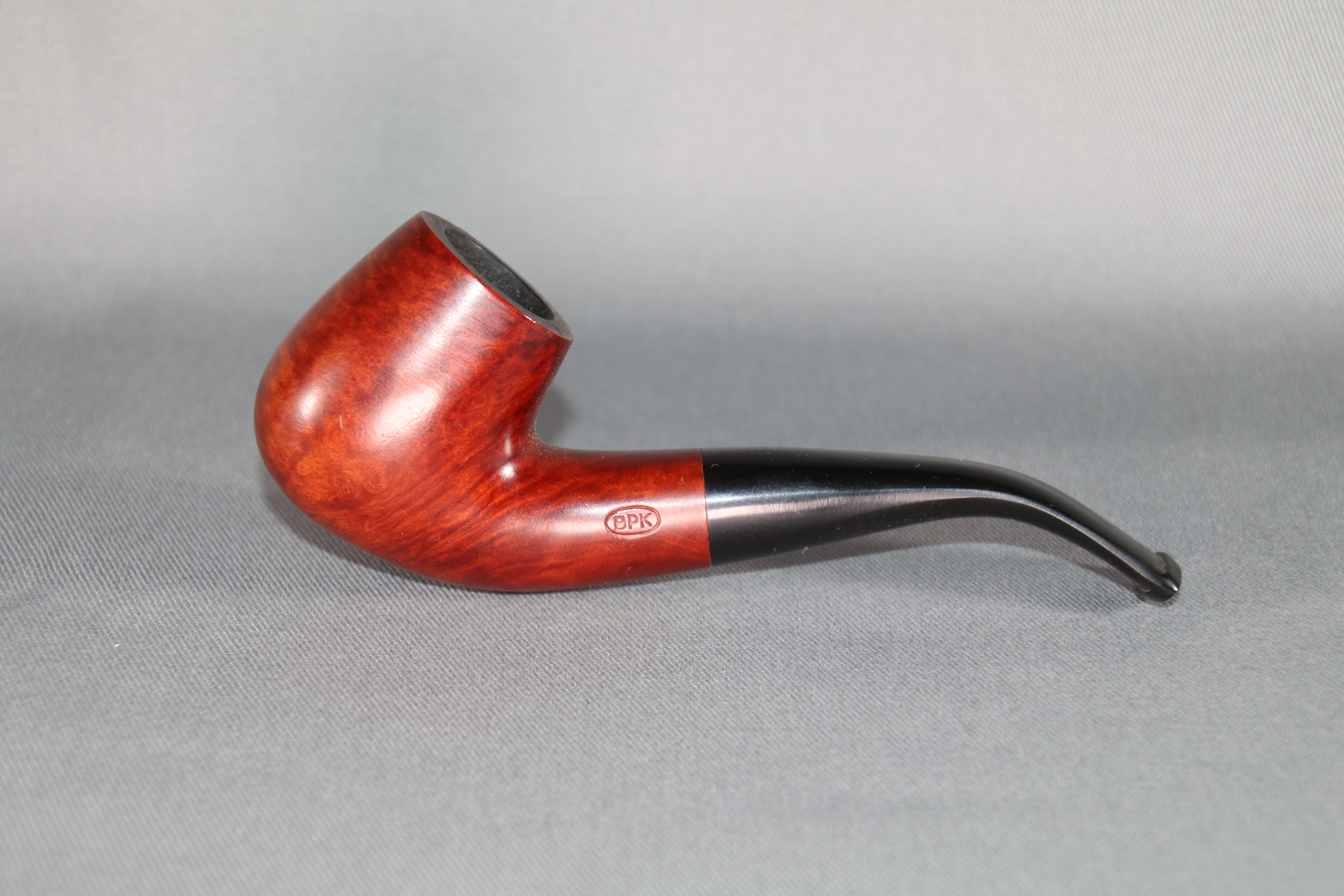
Bent (Billiard)

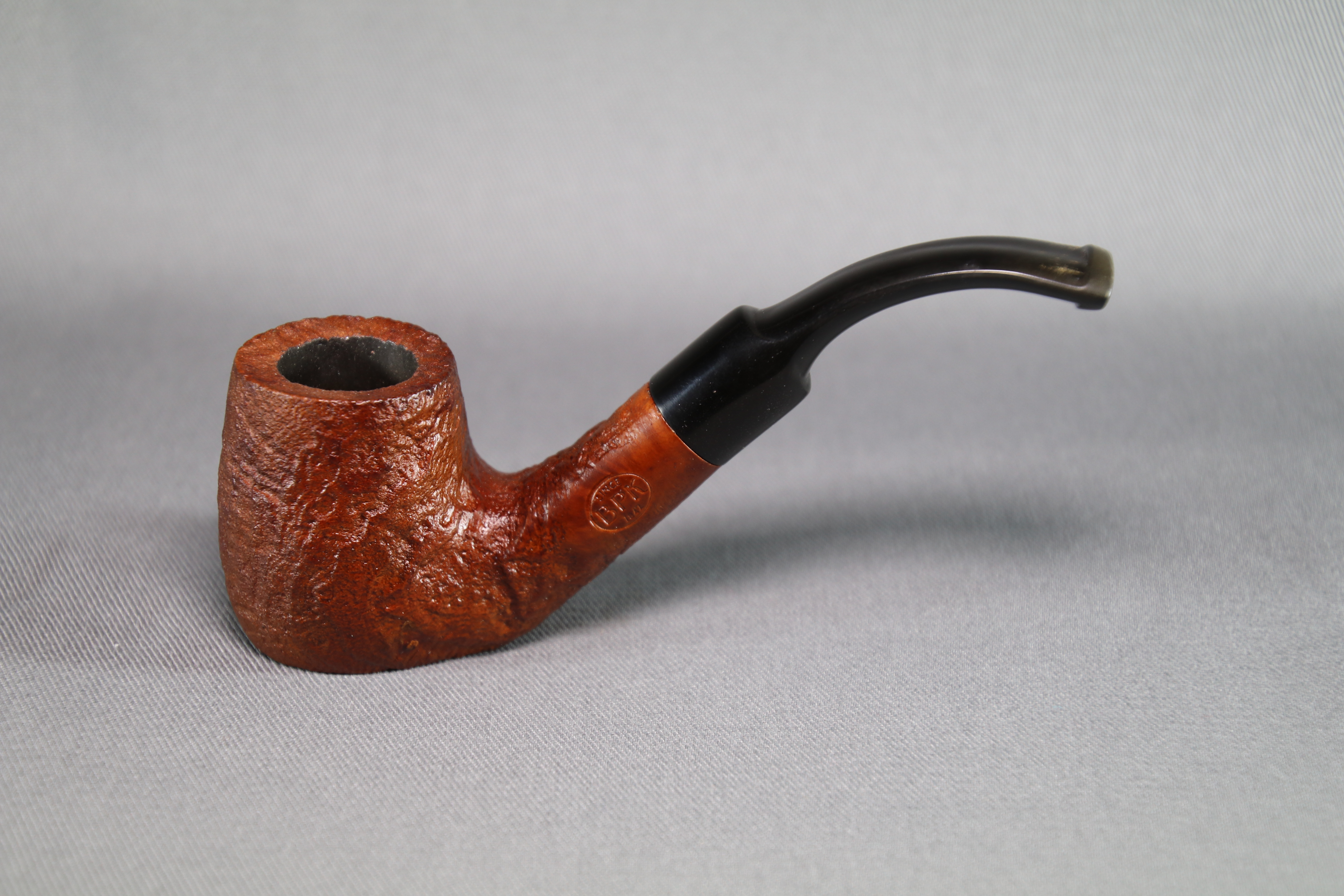
Sitter

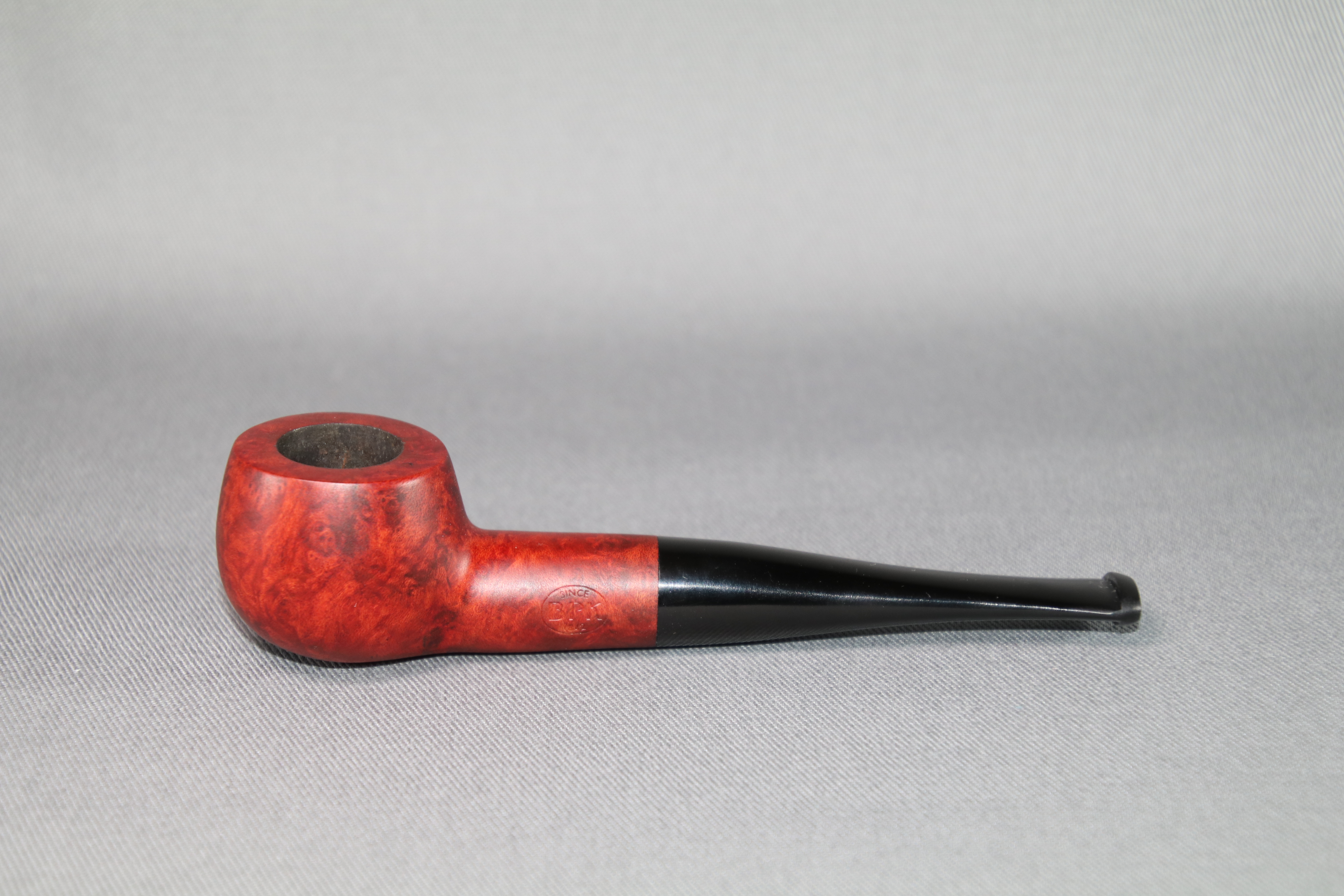
Pot

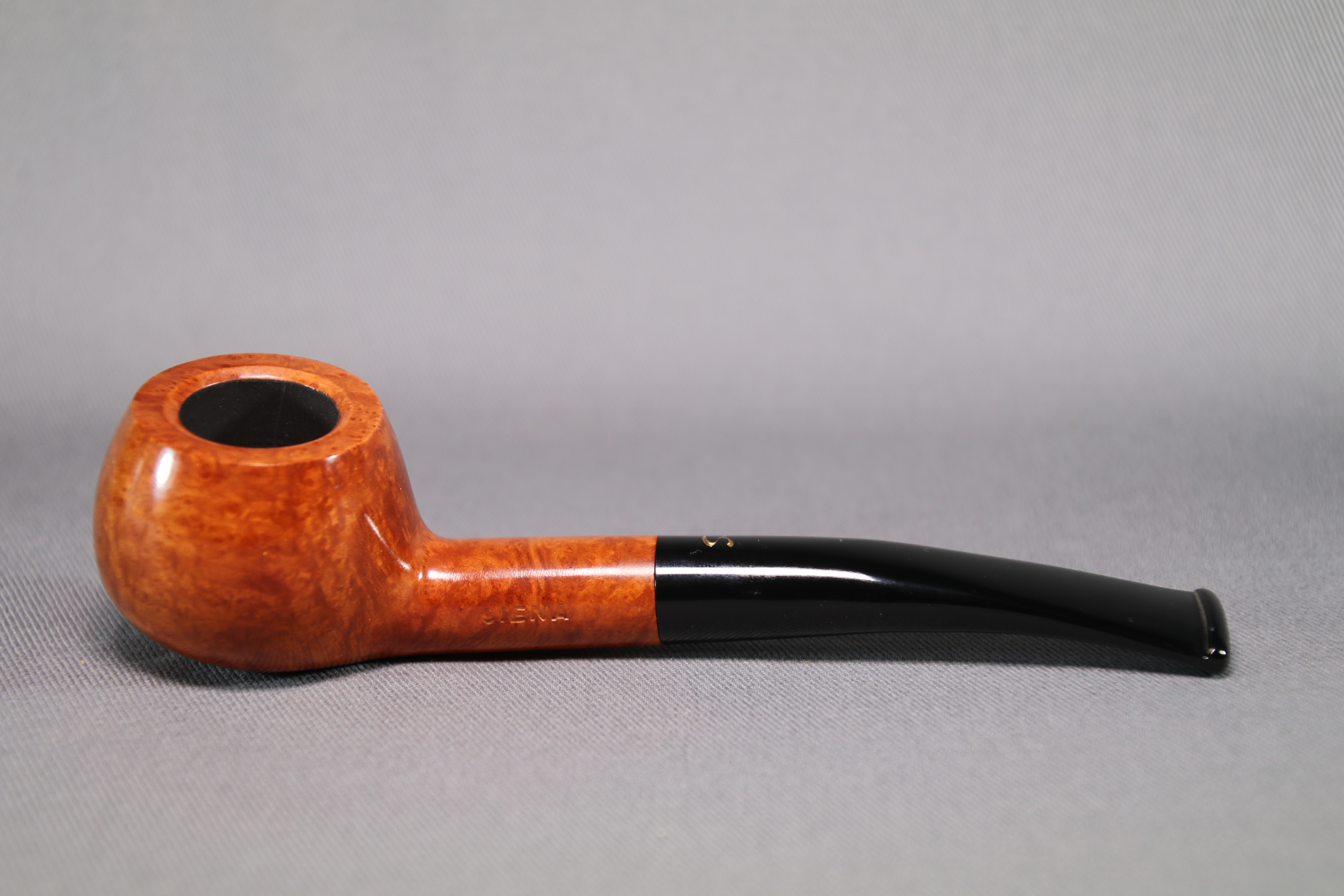
Prince

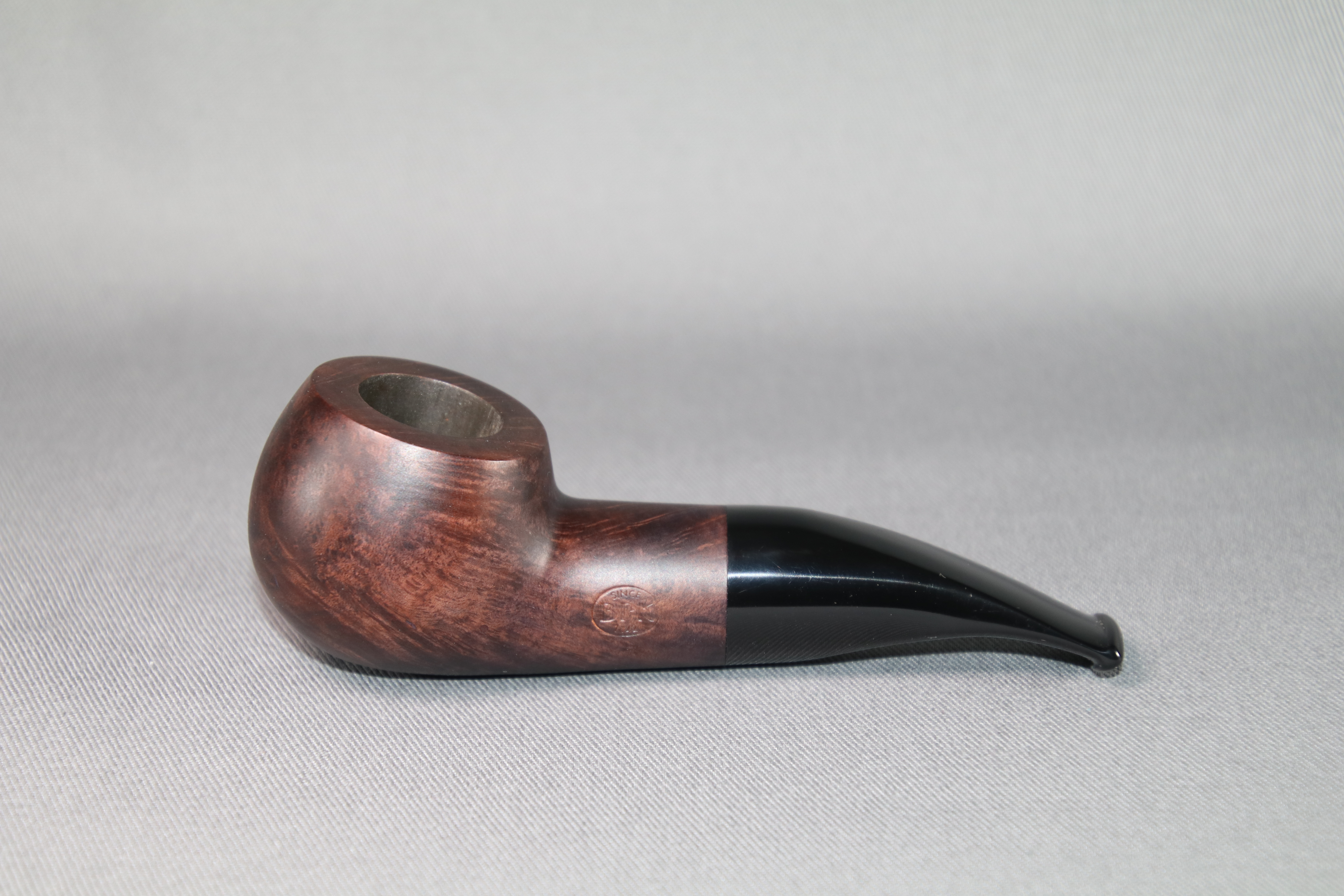
Author (specifically "Czech Bulldog")

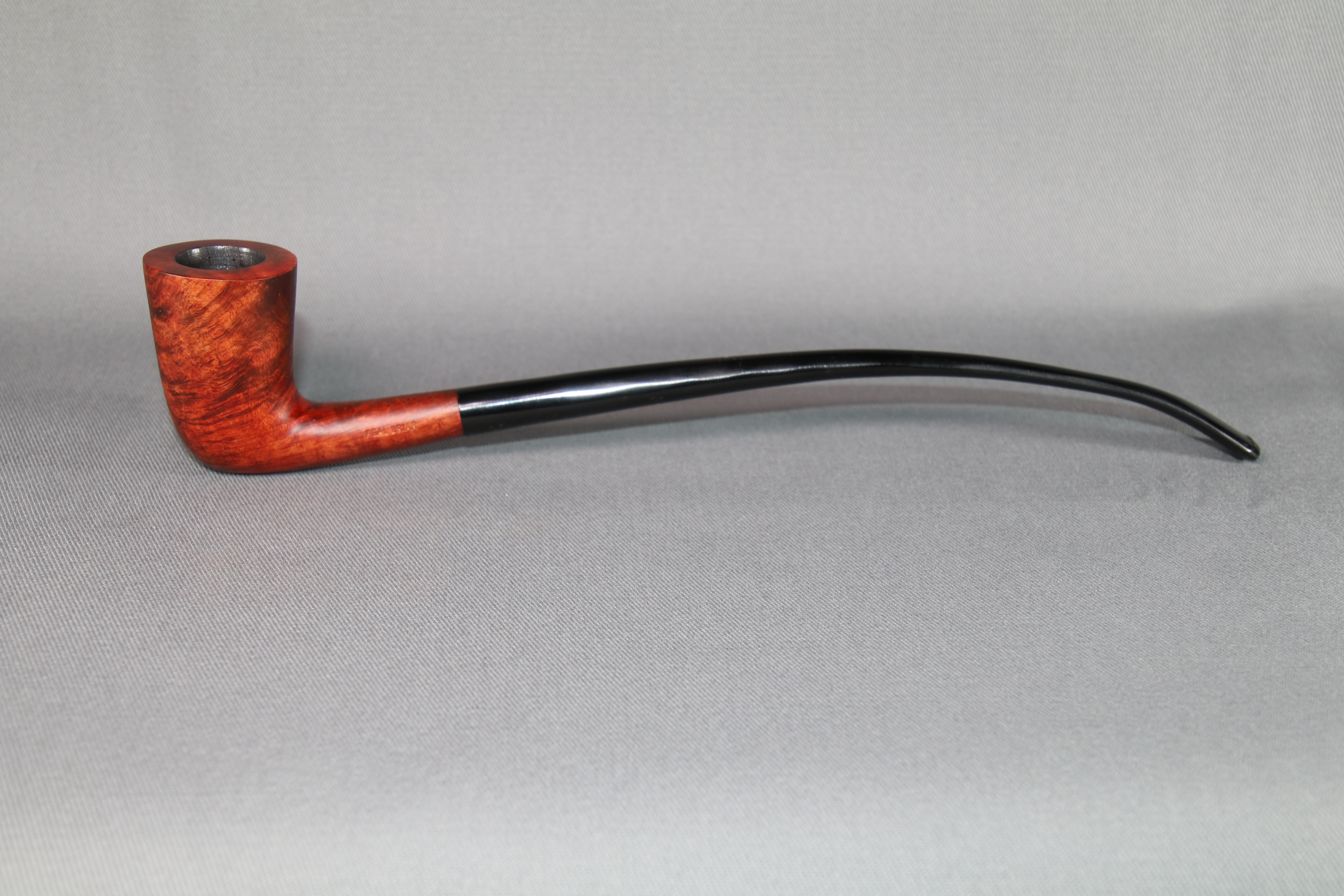
Churchwarden

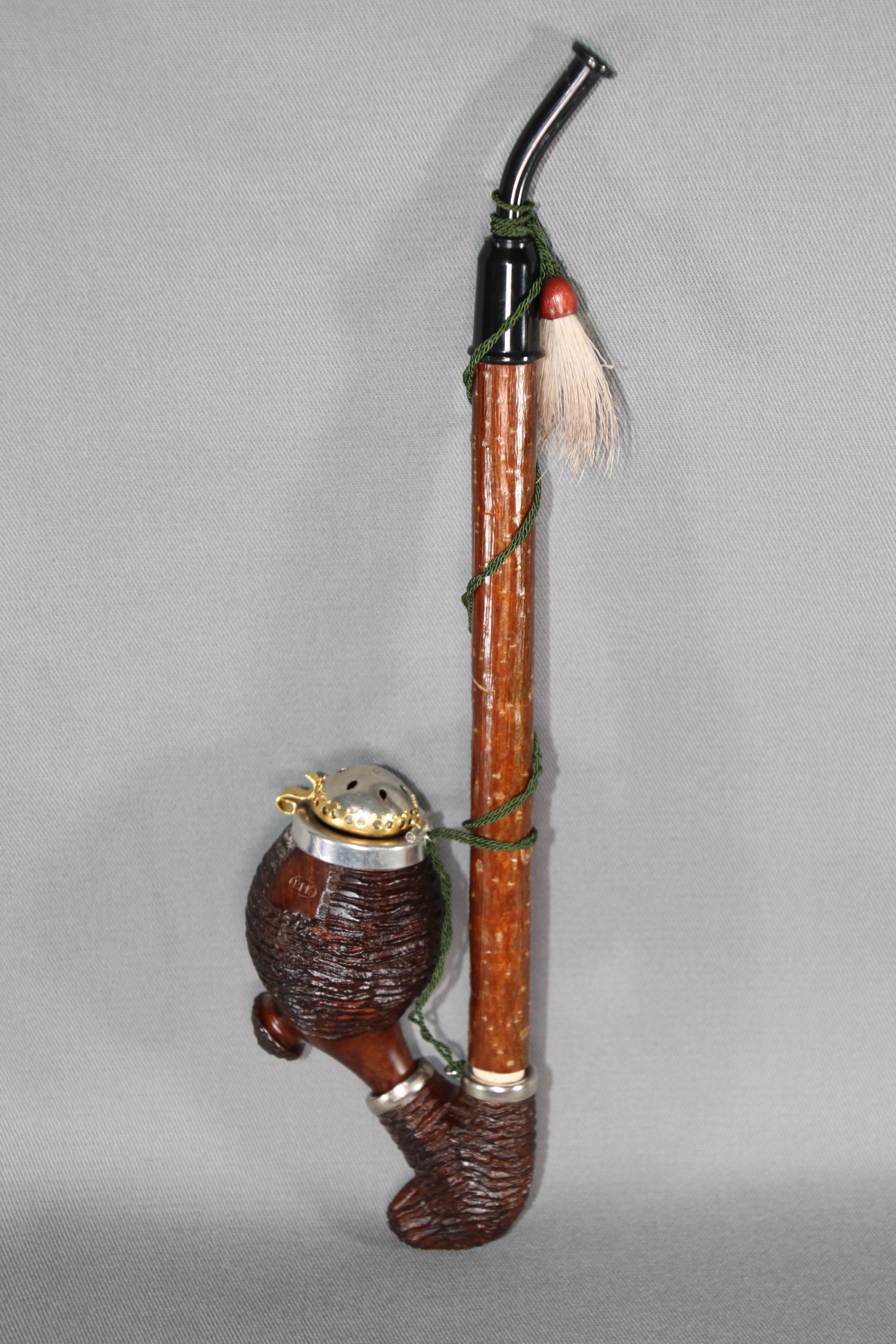
Tyrolean

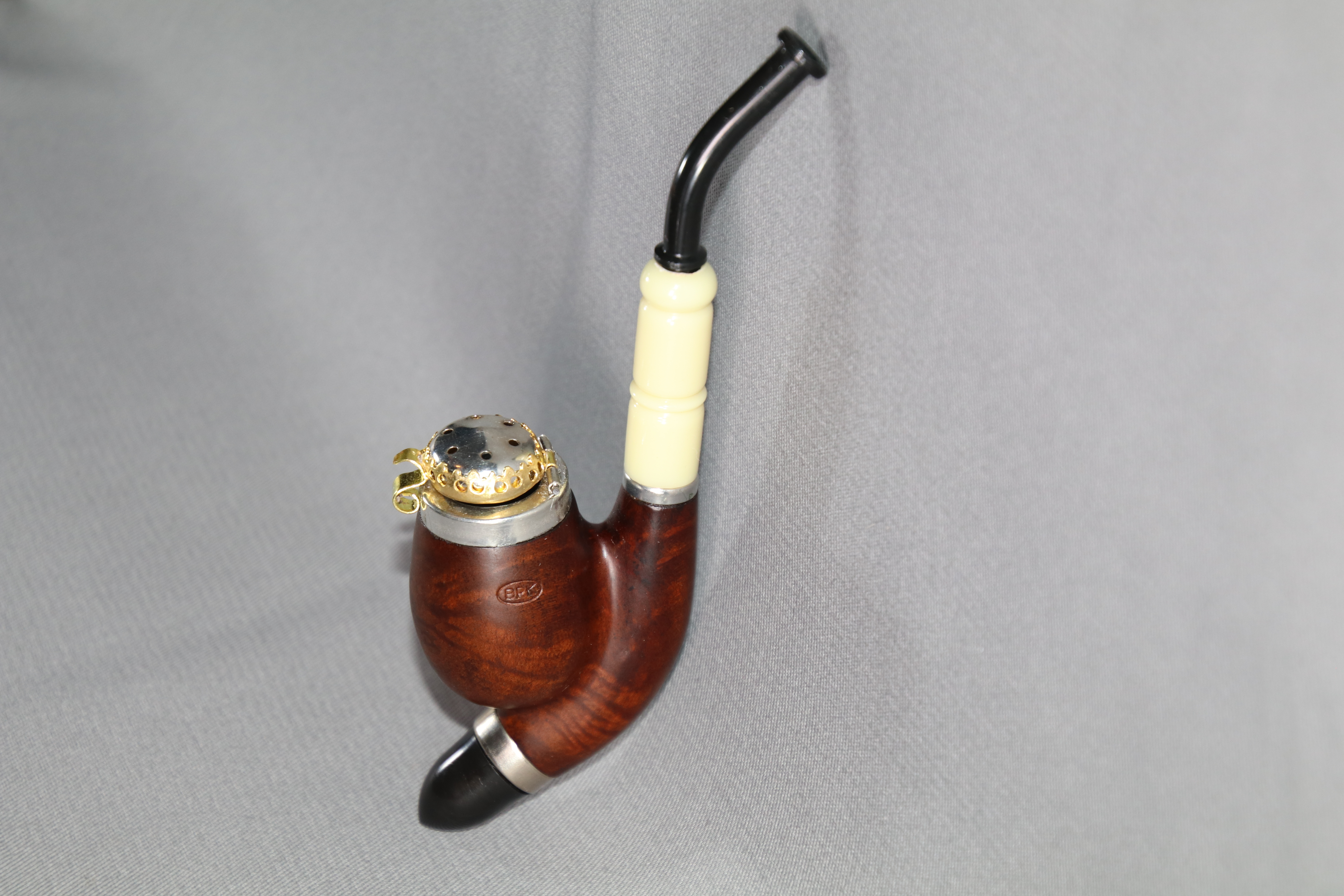
Cavalier

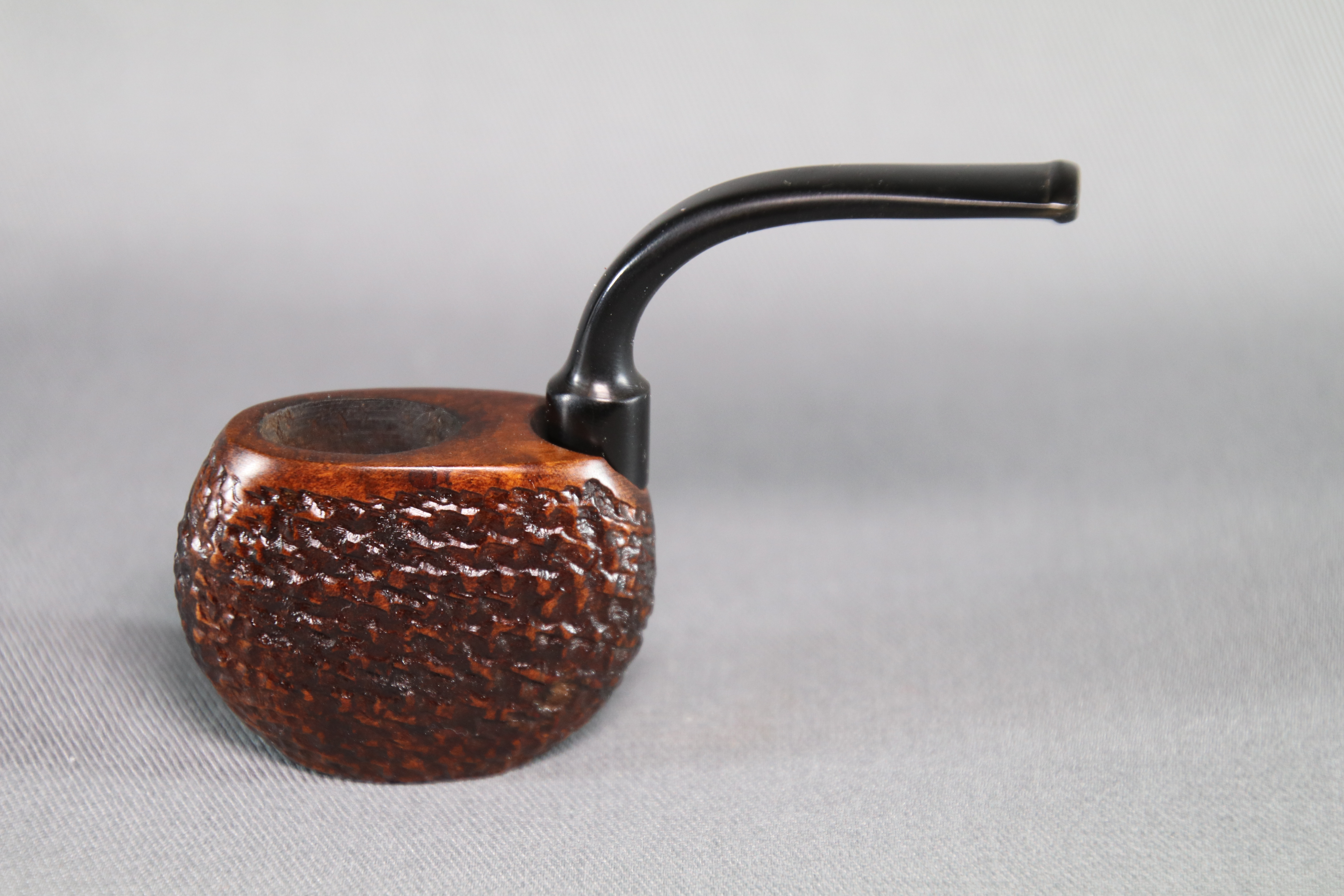
Vest Pocket

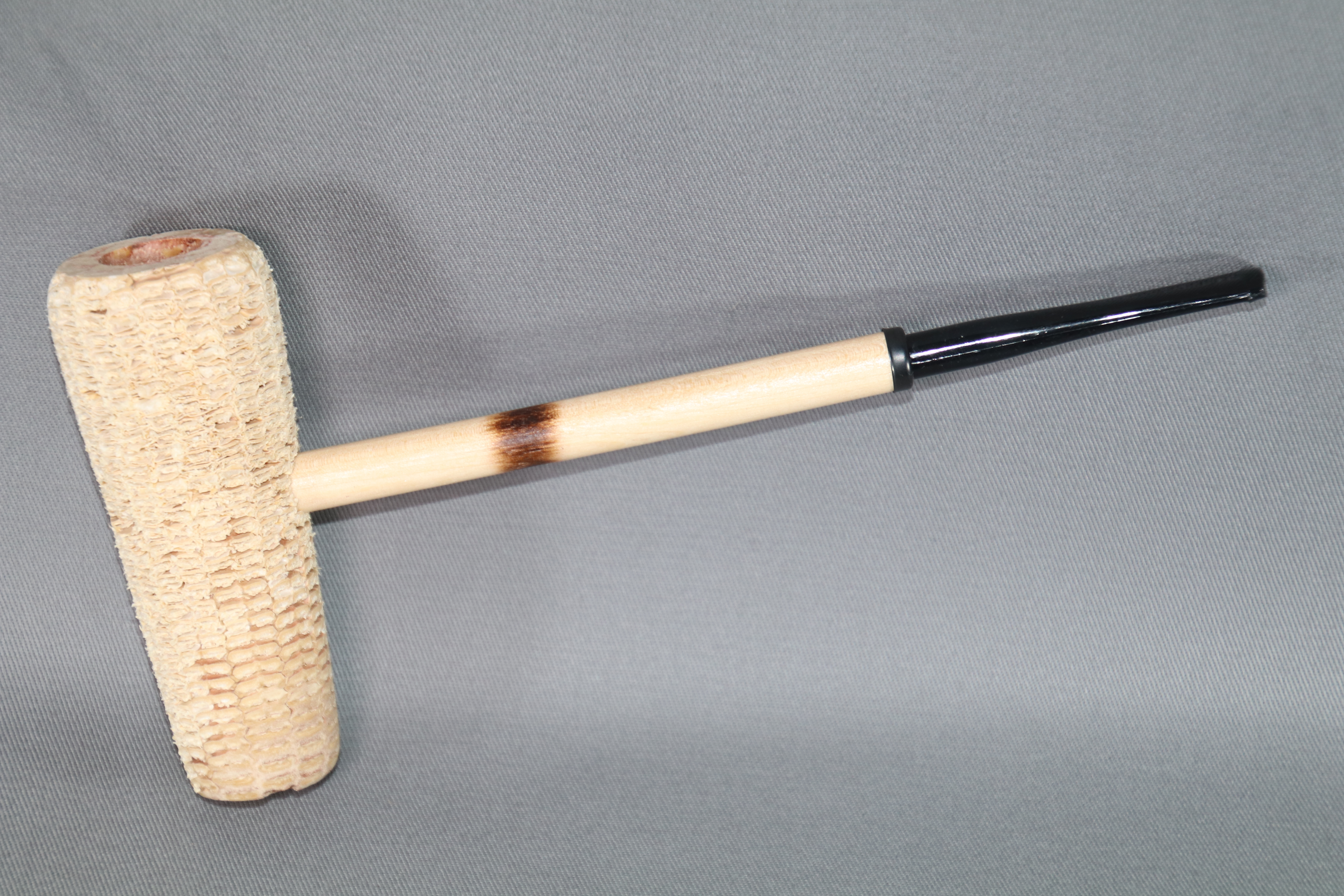
MacArthur

==== Calabash ====
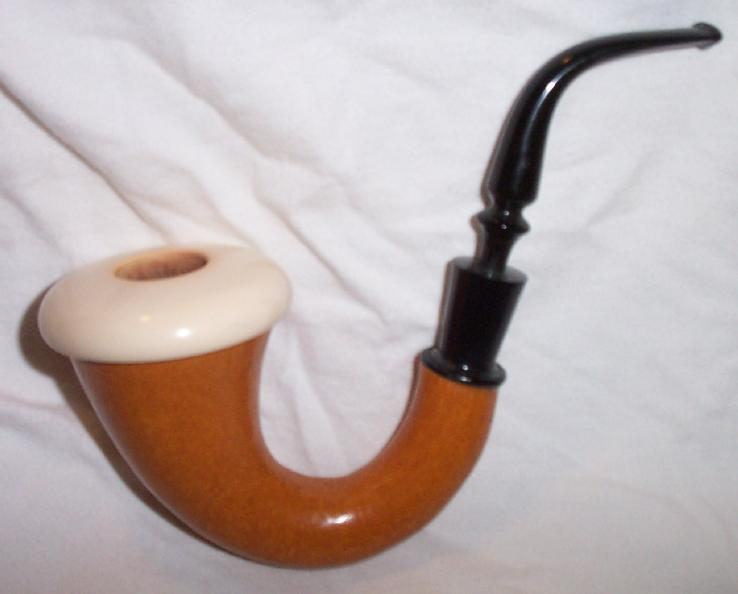
Calabash pipe with meerschaum bowl. This particular example was made in the US by the Pioneer pipe company. First appearing in the late 1960s, these were sold as a cheaper alternative to European-made calabashes. The Vulcanite joiner and fussy bit are distinctive signs of the company's manufacture.

Calabash gourds (usually with meerschaum or porcelain bowls set inside them) have long made prized pipes, but they are labour-intensive and, today, quite expensive. Because of this expense, pipes with bodies made of wood (usually mahogany) instead of gourd, but with the same classic shape, are sold as calabashes. Both wood and gourd pipes are functionally the same (with the important exception that the dried gourd, usually being noticeably lighter, sits more comfortably in the mouth). They consist of a downward curve that ends with an upcurve where the bowl sits. Beneath the bowl is an air chamber which serves to cool, dry, and mellow the smoke. There are also briar pipes being sold as calabashes. These typically do not have an air chamber and are so named only because of their external shape.

Although the calabash is stereotypically associated with Sherlock Holmes, Sir Arthur Conan Doyle only described the detective smoking clay, cherrywood or briar pipes, often during deductive meditations. All of these may be curved or straight, but Doyle's illustrator Sidney Paget only drew him smoking straight pipes. Actor William Gillette used a curved briar when portraying Holmes; the curved stem allowed him to hold the pipe without covering his mouth as he spoke. A 1931 botanical paper attests the association of the heavier calabash with Holmes and by the 1940s the stereotype was well established, sometimes played for comic effect as in Abbott and Costello's Who Done It? (1942).

==== Pipes with removable bowl ====
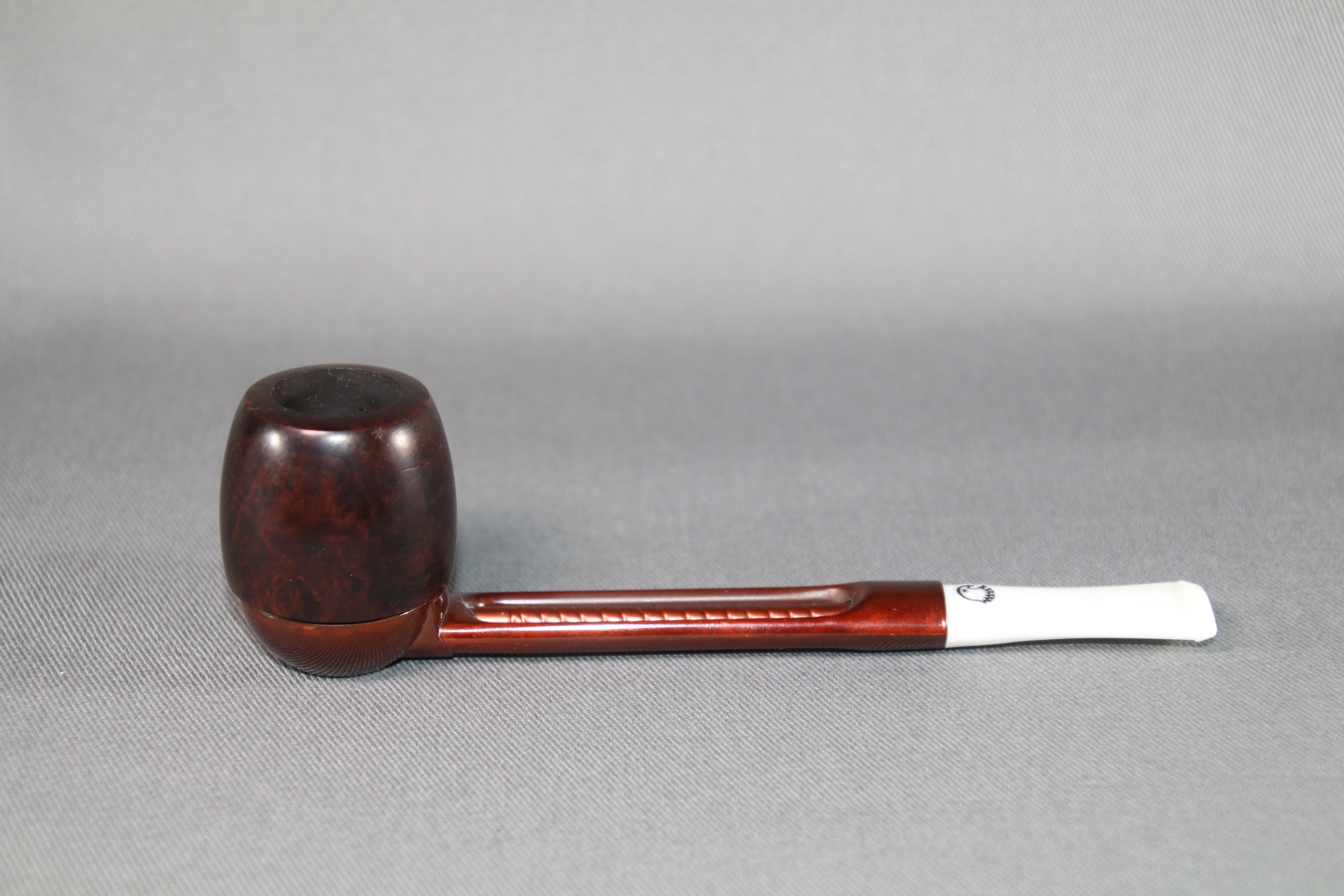
Falcon pipe.

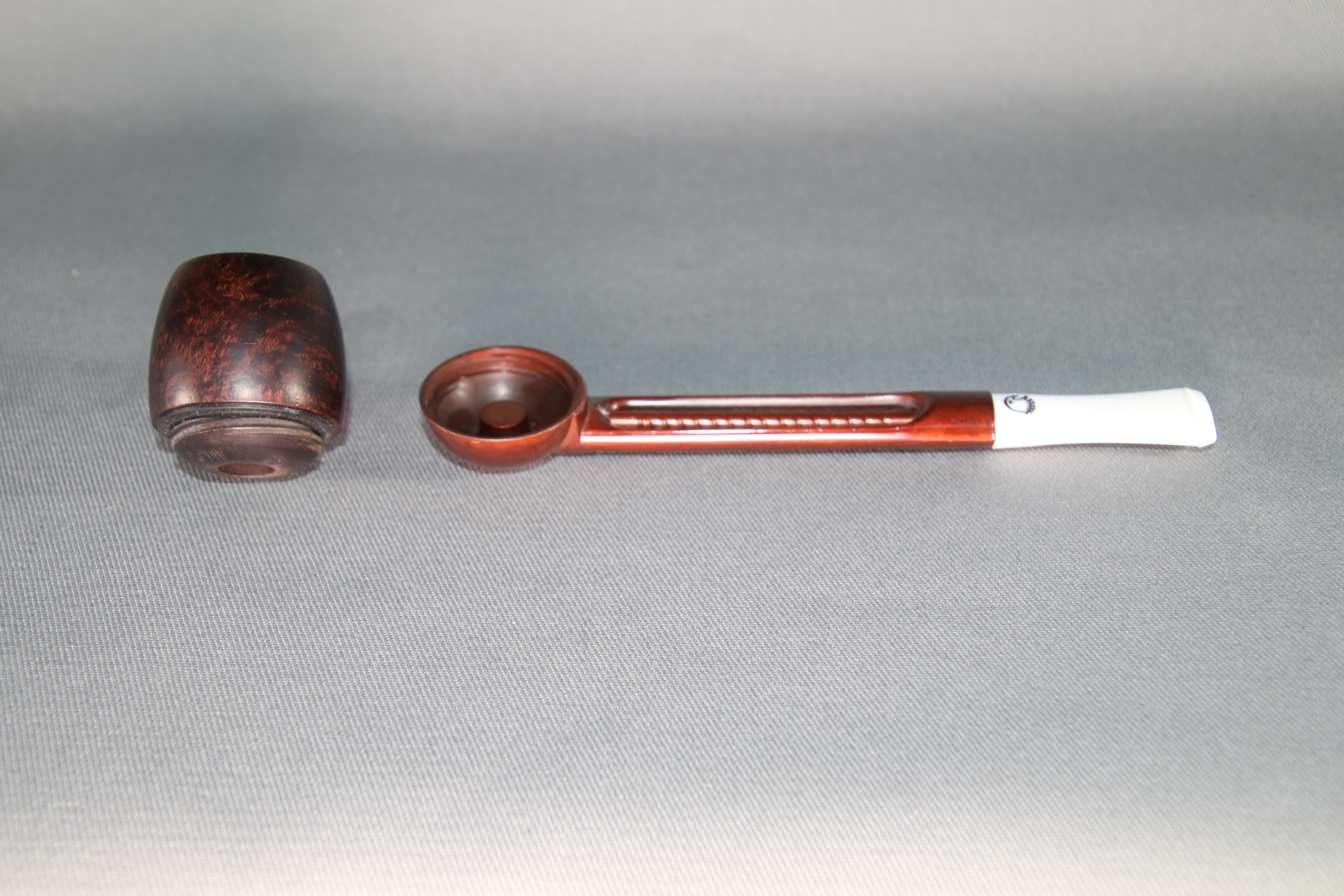
Falcon pipe with bowl detached.

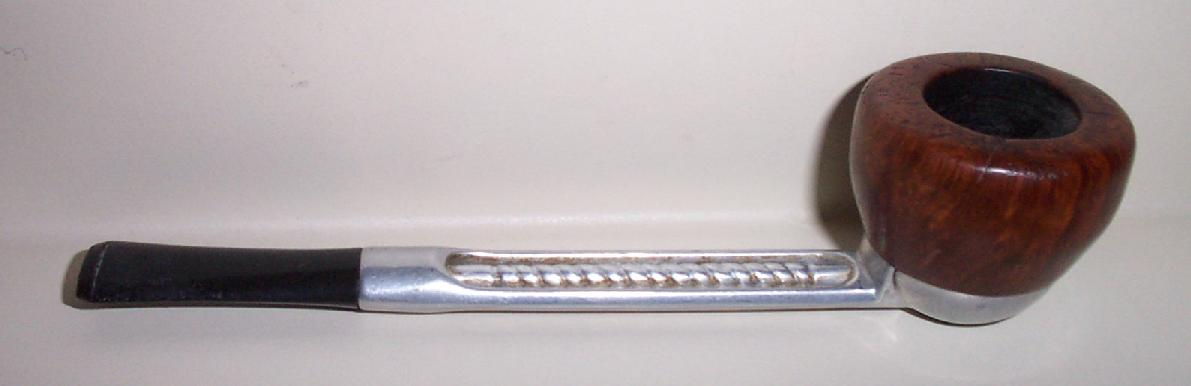
Falcon pipe.

Bowls are made of varying shapes and materials to allow the smoker to try different characteristics or to dedicate particular bowls for particular tobaccos. Bowls are not interchangeable between manufacturers.

==== Hookahs ====
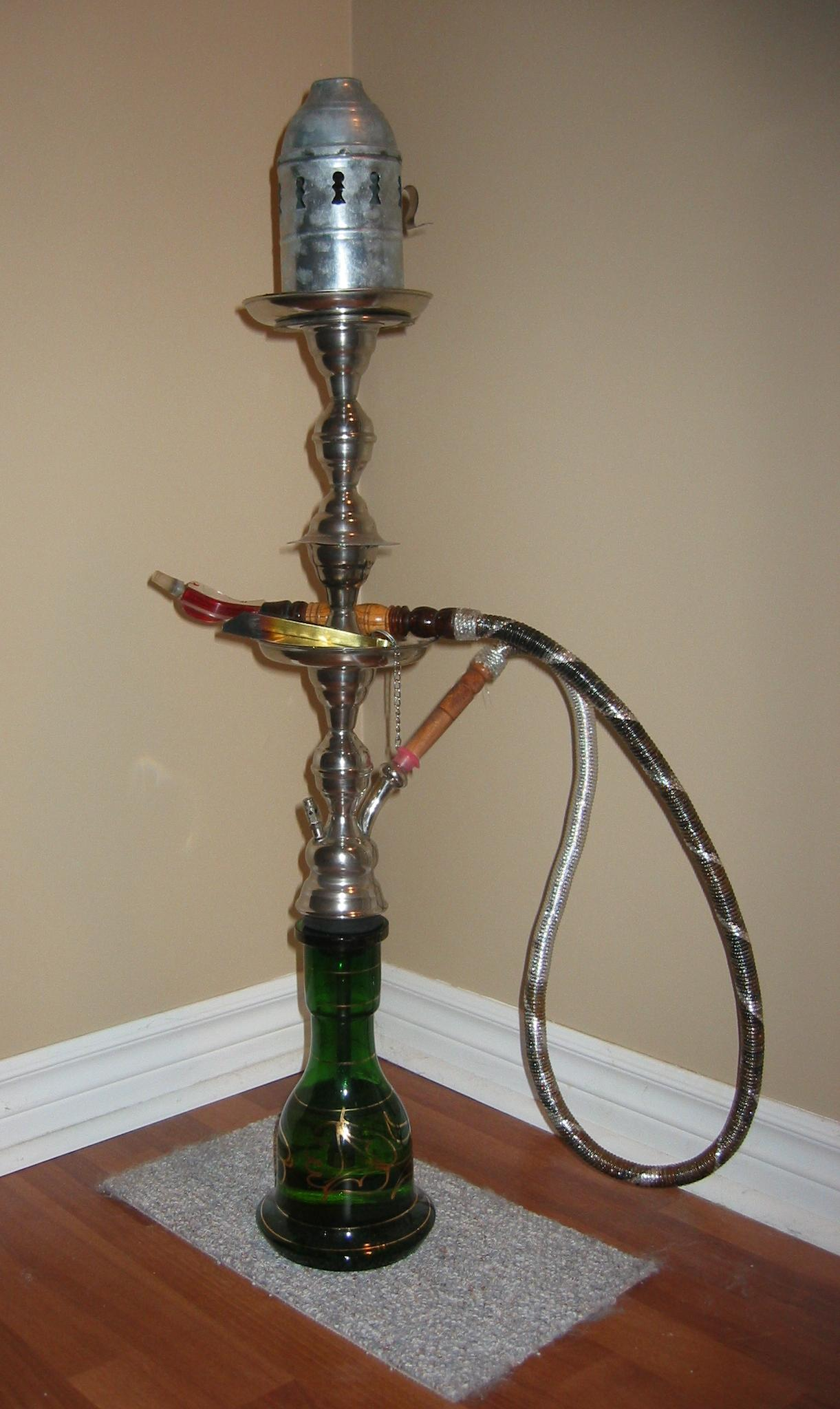
An Egyptian hookah (shisha)

A hookah, ghelyan, or narghile, is a Middle Eastern water pipe that cools the smoke by filtering it through a water chamber. Often ice or artificial flavorings are added to the water. Traditionally, the tobacco is mixed with a sweetener, such as honey or molasses. Fruit flavors have also become popular. Modern hookah smokers, especially in the US, smoke "me'assel", "moassel", "molasses" or "shisha", all names for the same wet mixture of tobacco, molasses/honey, glycerine, and often, flavoring. This style of tobacco is smoked in a bowl with foil or a screen (metal or glass) on top of the bowl. More traditional tobaccos are "tombiek" (a dry unflavored tobacco, which the user moistens in water, squeezes out the extra liquid, and places coals directly on top) or "jarak" (more of a paste of tobacco with fruit to flavor the smoke).

=== Bowl materials ===
North American natives along the East coast traditionally made their tobacco pipes from clay or from a type of pot-stone (lapis ollaris), or else serpentine stone. In the Upper Midwest they made use of the red pipestone or catlinite for the same, a fine-grained easily worked stone of a rich red color of the Coteau des Prairies. Today, other construction materials used for the bowl may include any of the following:

- Briar – root of Erica arborea, prevalent material.
- Meerschaum – mineral sepiolite called "sea foam".
- Gourd
- Porcelain
- Synthetics
- Ebony ("Zappi")
- Cherry wood
- Beechwood
- Corn cob
- Metal – used by Japanese kiseru and Arabian midwakh.
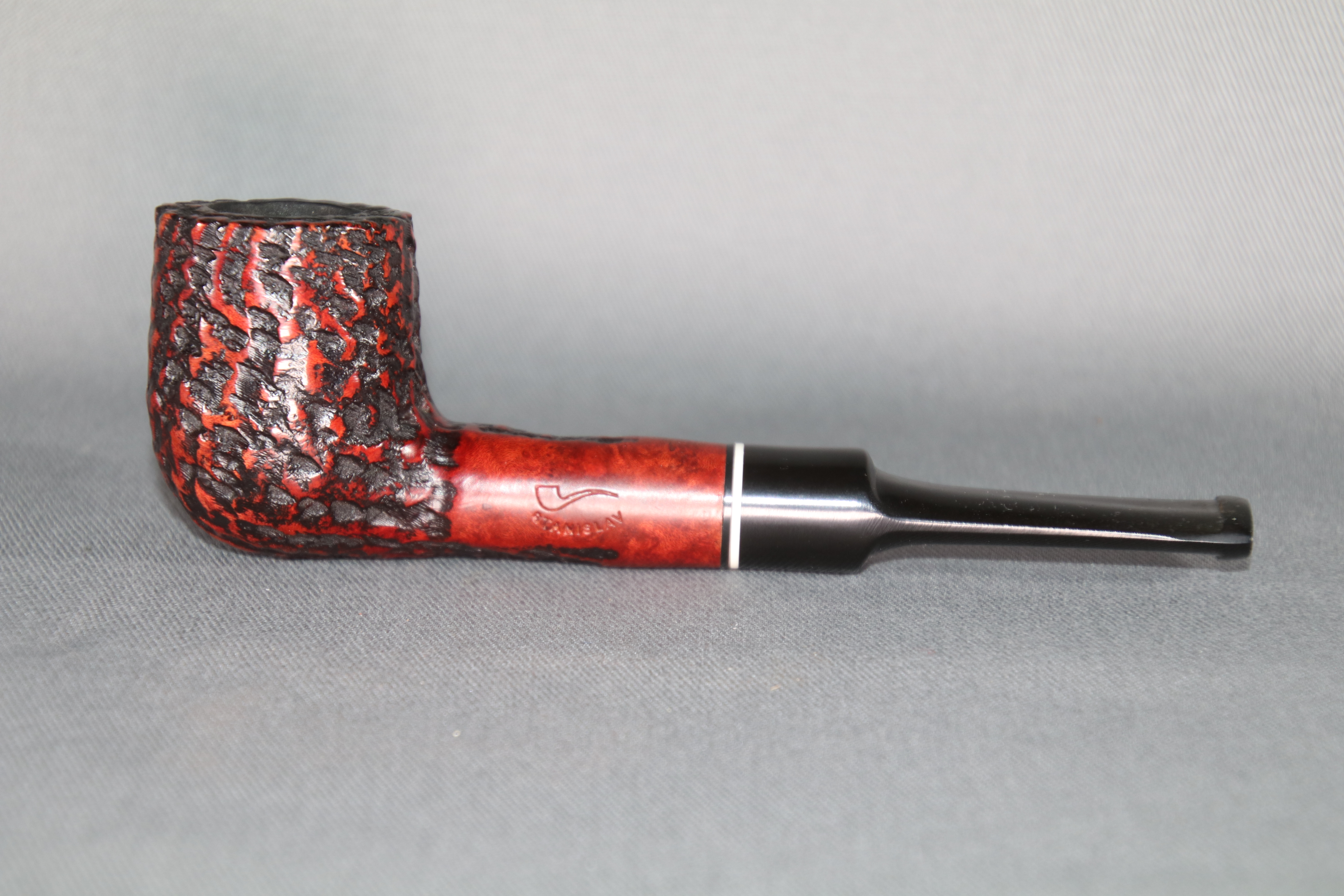
Briar

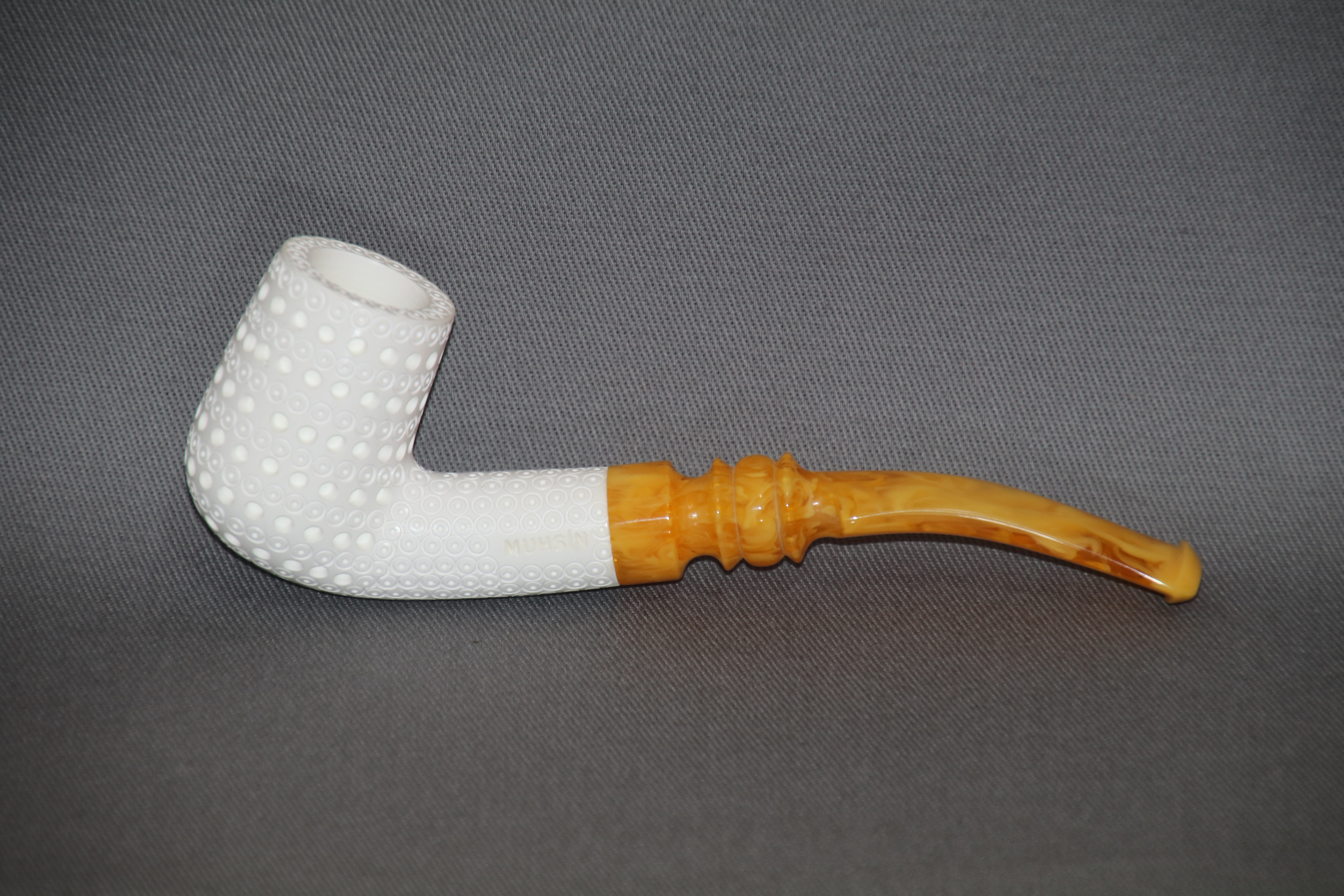
Meerschaum

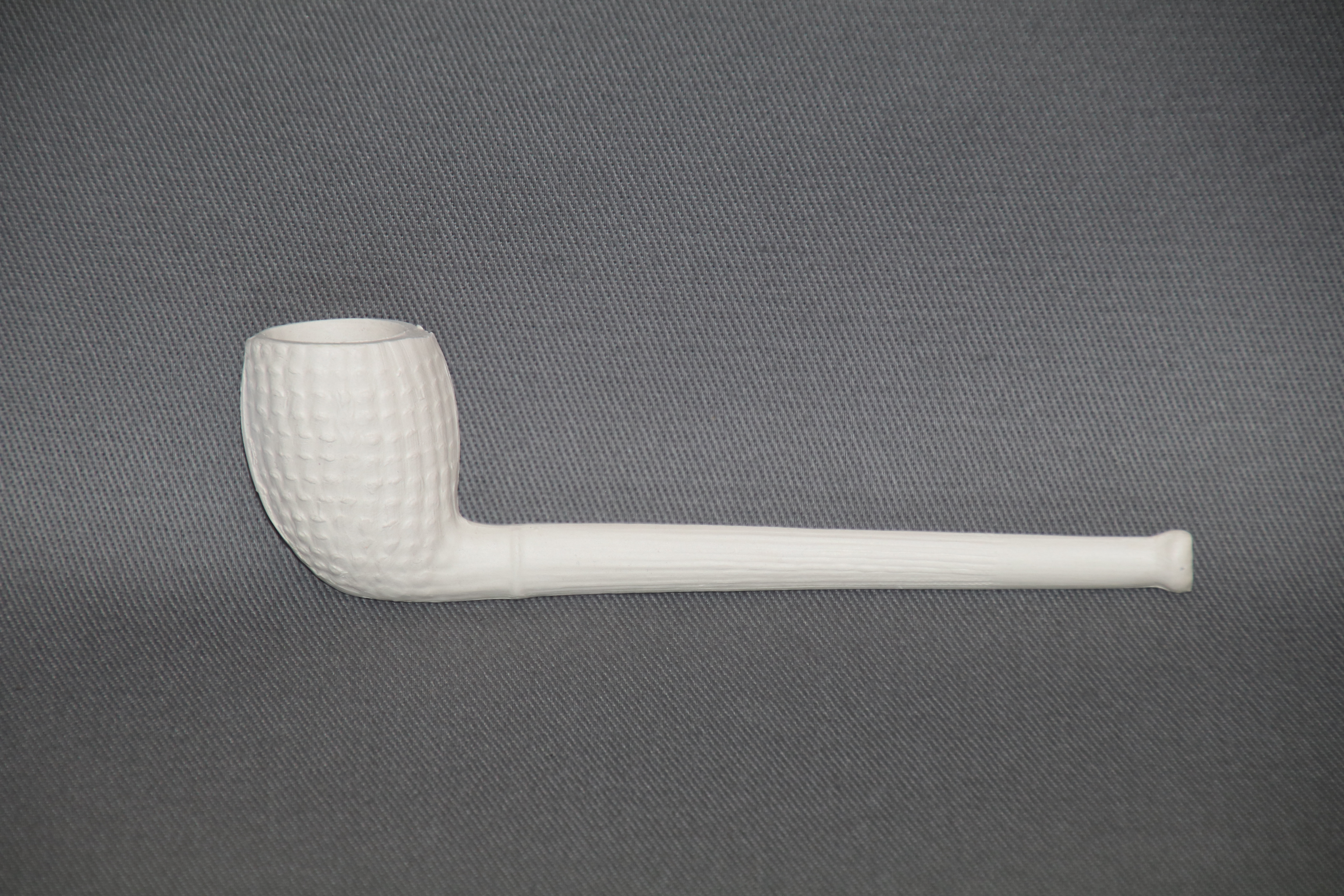
Clay

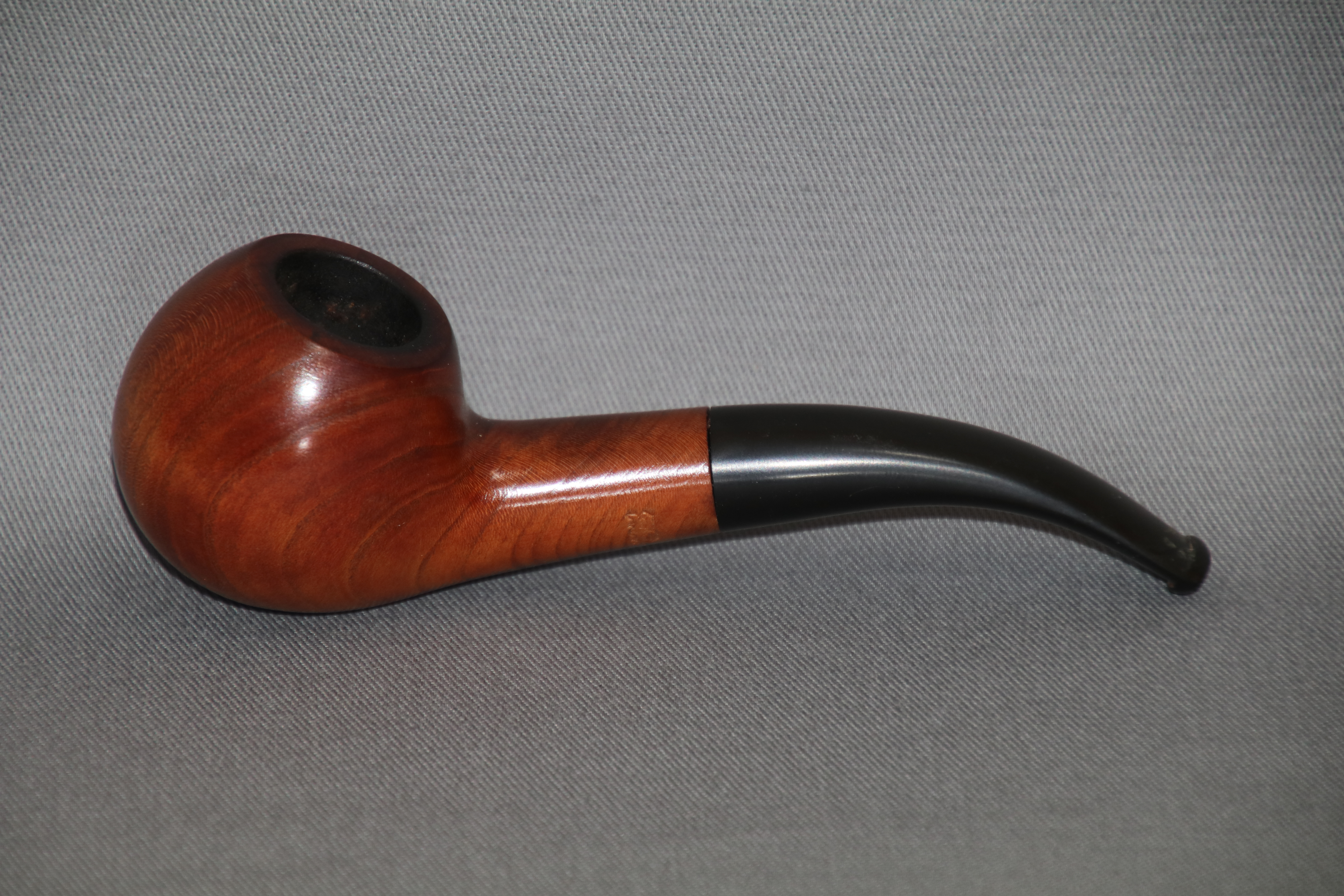
Cherry wood

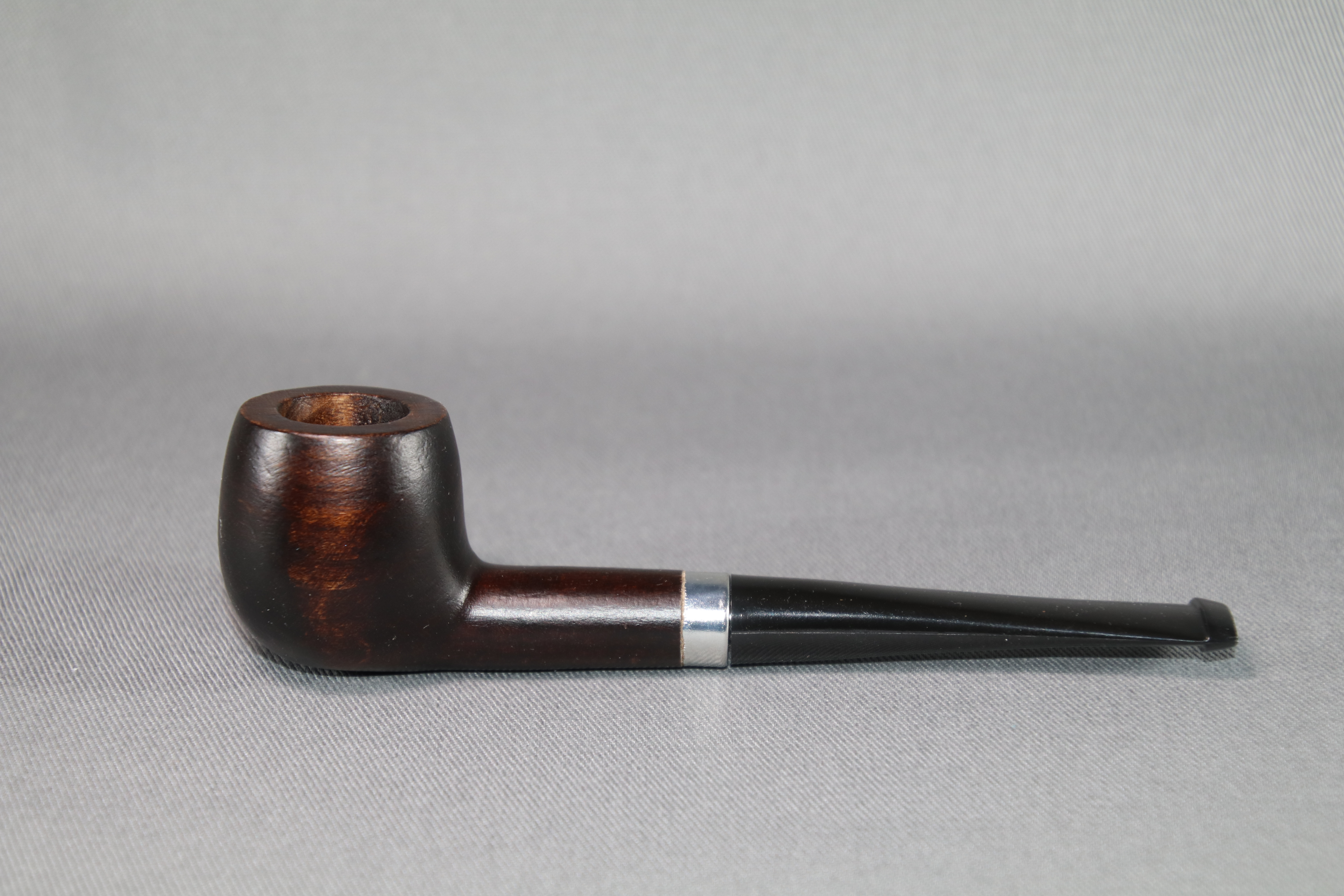
Beechwood

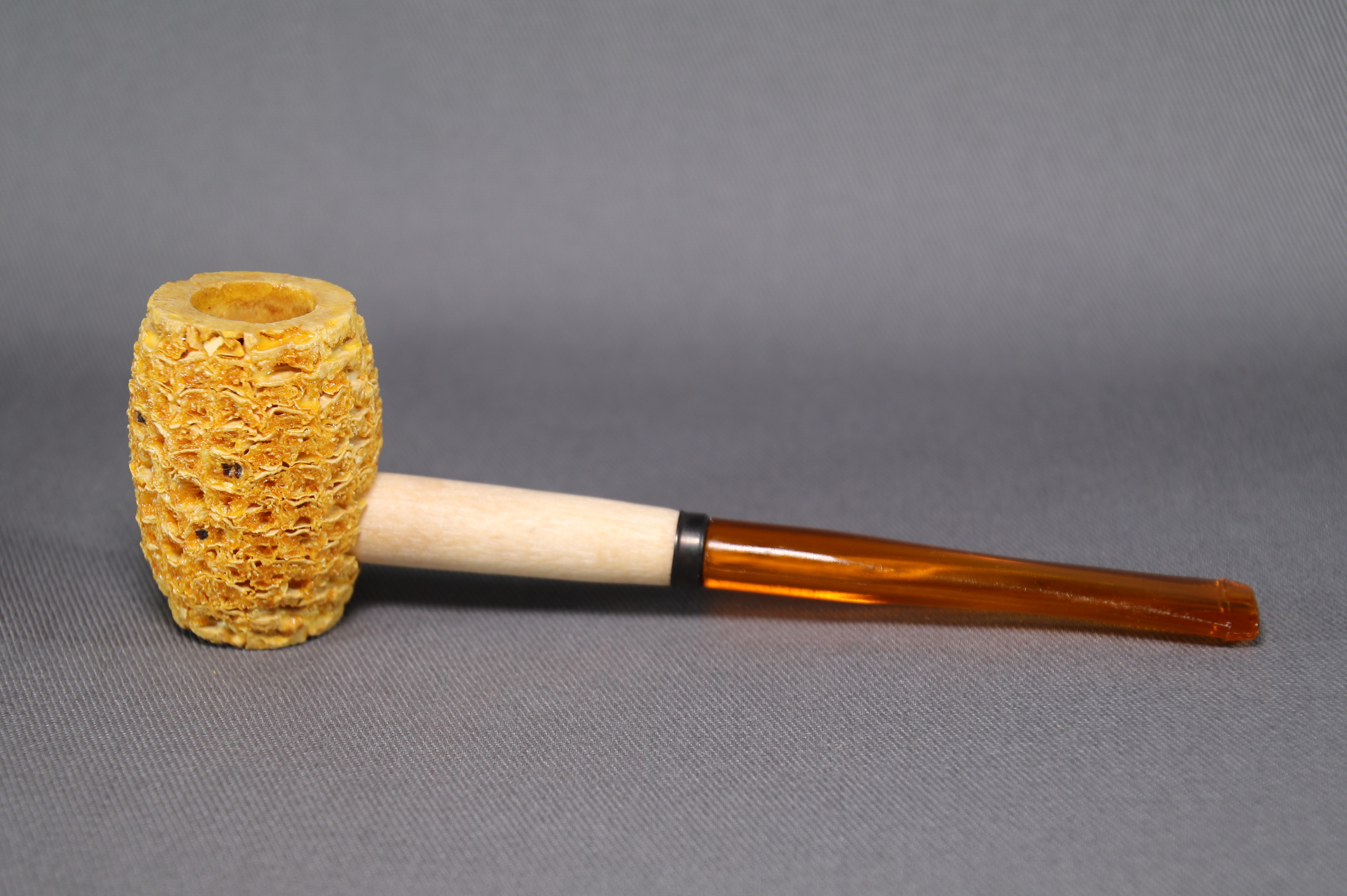
Corn cob

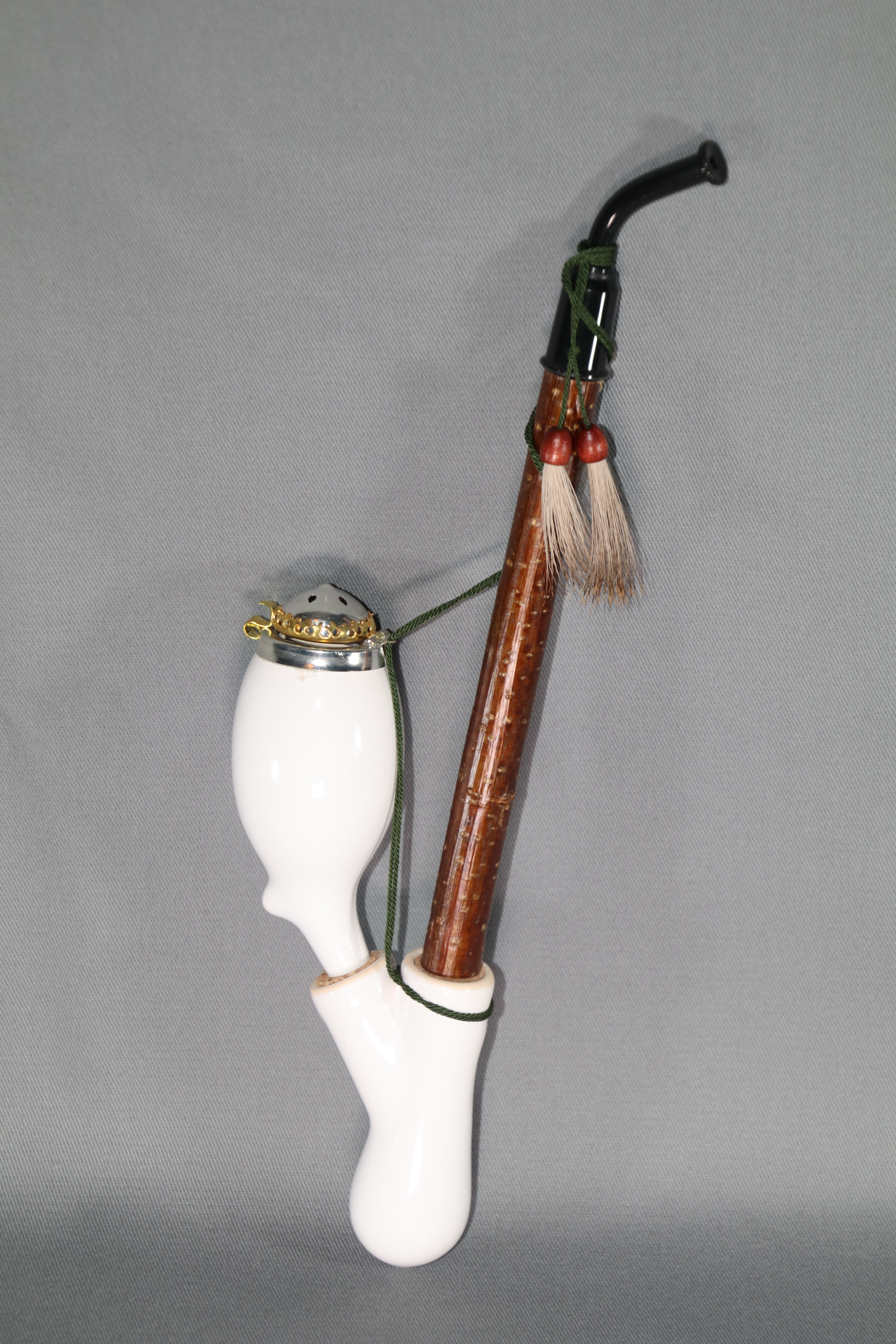
Porcelain

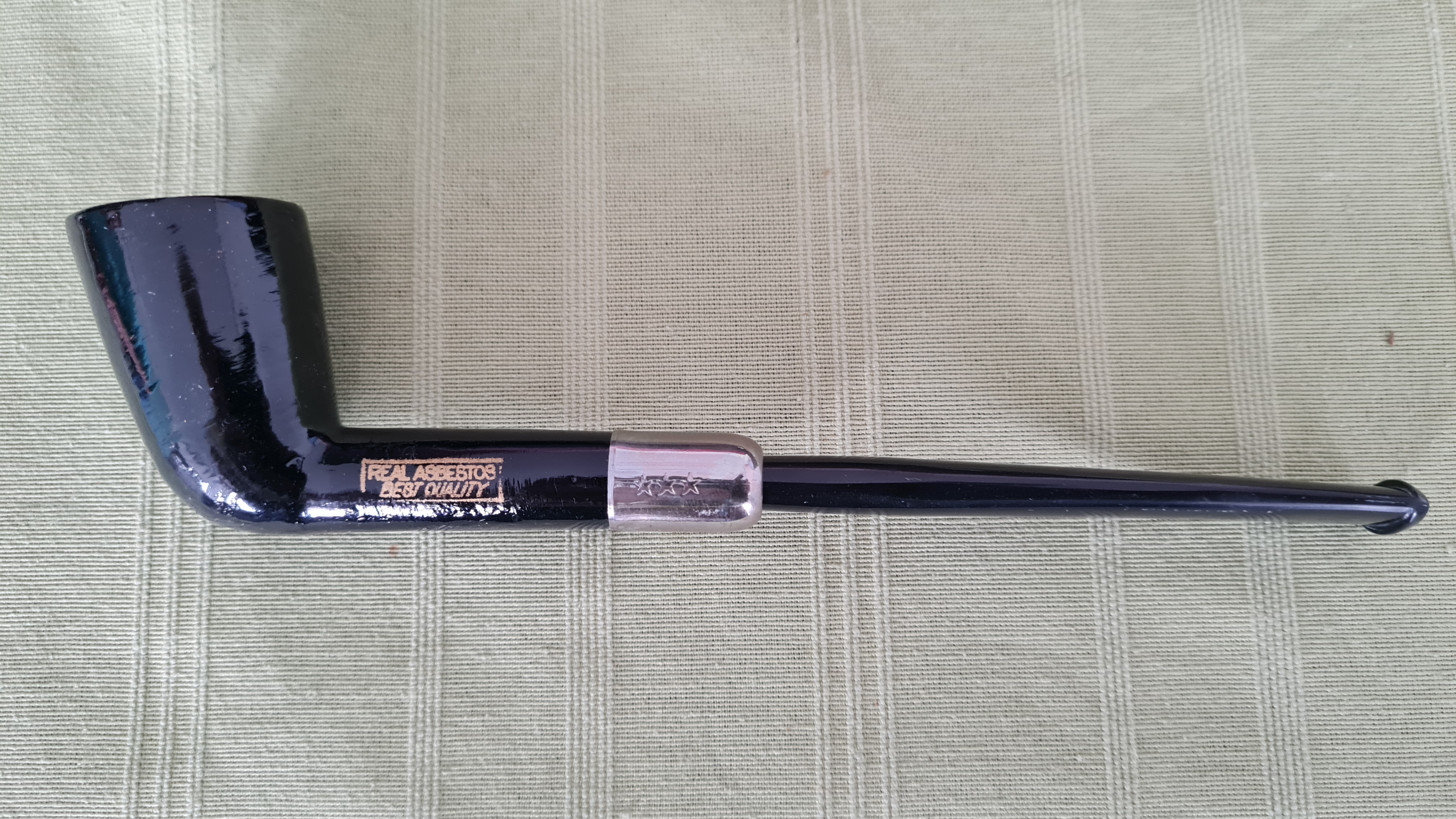
Asbestos

==== Briar ====
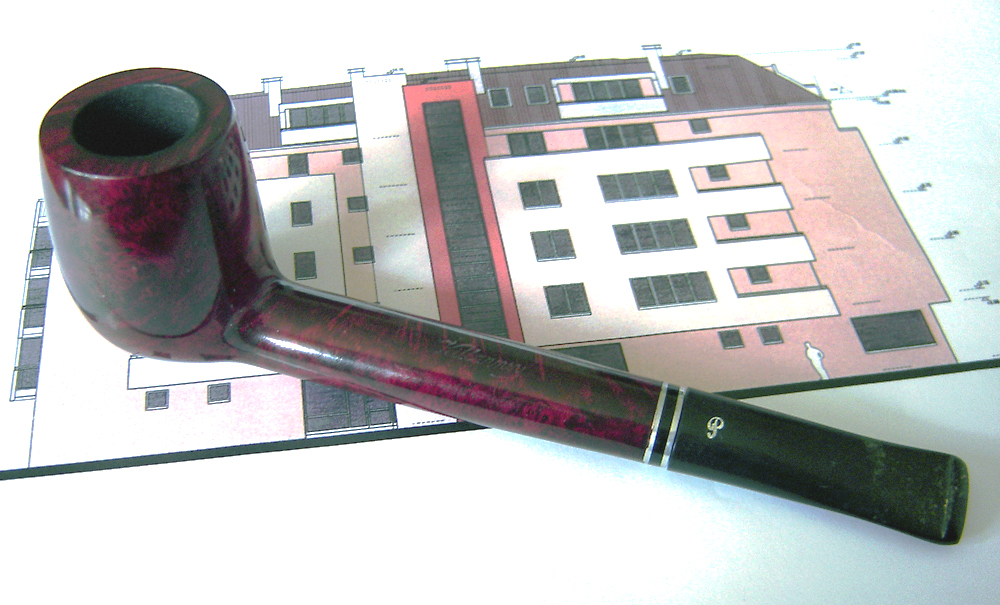
A Peterson briar pipe

The majority of pipes sold today, whether handmade or machine-made, are fashioned from briar. Briar is a particularly well suited wood for pipe making for a number of reasons. The first and most important characteristic is its natural resistance to fire. The second is its inherent ability to absorb moisture. The burl absorbs water in nature to supply the tree in the dry times and likewise will absorb the moisture that is a byproduct of combustion. Briar is cut from the root burl of the tree heath (Erica arborea), which is native to the rocky and sandy soils of the Mediterranean region. Briar burls are cut into two types of blocks; ebauchon and plateaux. Ebauchon is taken from the heart of the burl while plateaux is taken from the outer part of the burl. While both types of blocks can produce pipes of the highest quality, most artisan pipemakers prefer to use plateaux because of their superior graining.

==== Clay ====
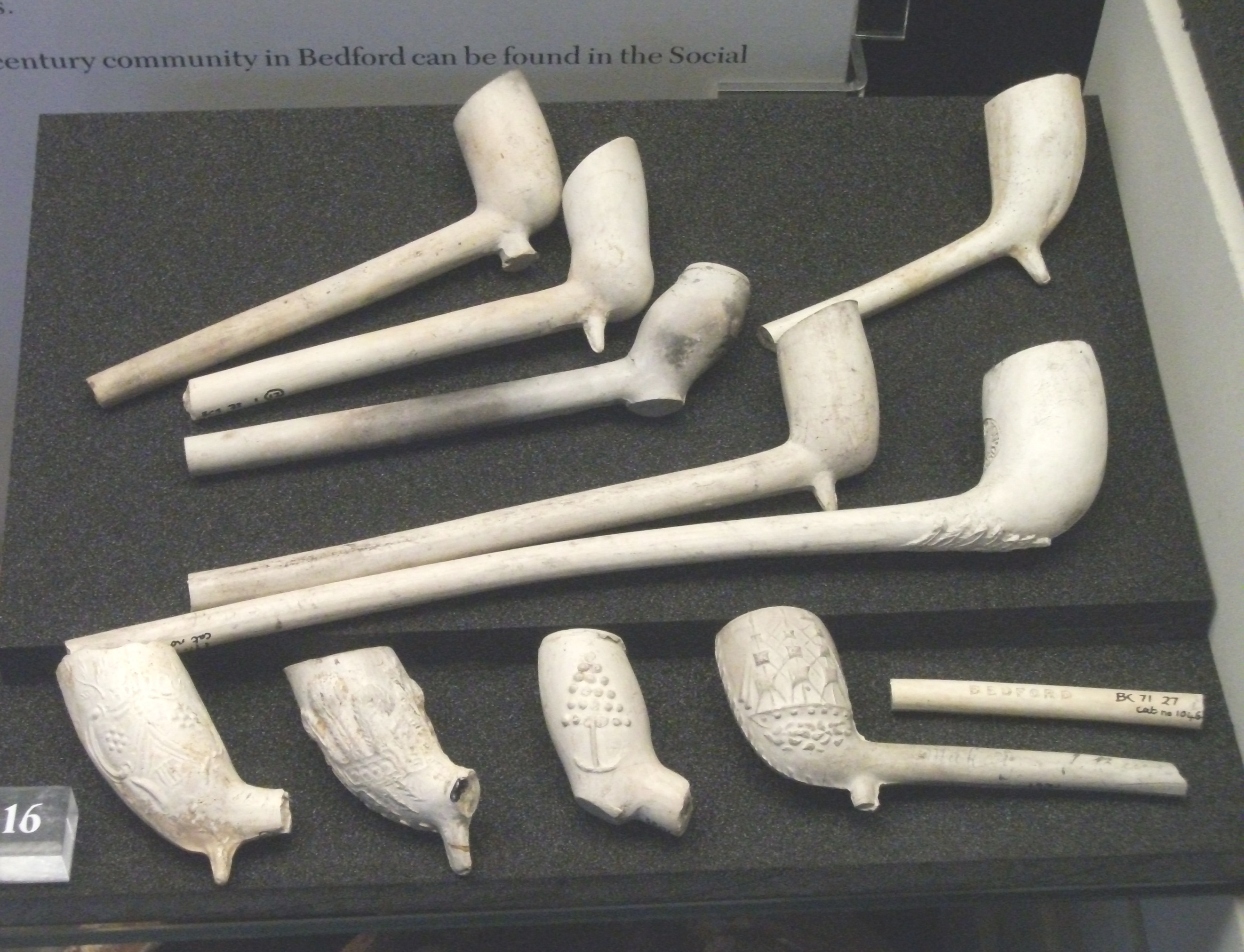
A group of English clay pipes, from the early 17th to late 19th century, none complete, Bedford Museum, 2010

Ceramic pipes, made of moulded and then fired clay, were used almost universally by Europeans between the introduction of tobacco in the 16th century, and the introduction of cheap cigarettes at the end of the nineteenth. Contrary to popular belief, the stems were not broken off for the next patron when shared in taverns, as the understanding of germs at the time would not have prompted this behavior.

The material is not very strong and the early varieties had long thin stems, so they frequently broke, but were cheap to replace. It has been claimed that this fragility was somewhat intentional as it was utilized by Colonial American tavern keepers, for example, in renting the clay pipes to patrons. It is known that communal pipes used in taverns were cleansed by being heated in an oven on special iron racks.

In England, clay pipes were sold in bundles of dozens or twenties, and were often free in taverns, where the tobacco was sold. They were made out of a ball clay. The manufacture of clay pipes was controlled by the Guild of Tobacco Pipemakers of Westminster, which was first incorporated in 1619 and later became a City of London Livery Company, reformed in 1954 as the Worshipful Company of Tobacco Pipe Makers and Tobacco Blenders.

Forming the pipe involved making them in moulds with the bore created by pushing an oiled wire inside the stem. The preferred material was pipeclay or "tobacco pipe clay", which fires to a white colour and is found in only certain locations. In North America, many clay pipes were historically made from more typical terracotta-coloured clays. According to one British writer in 1869, the French preferred old pipes and the English new, the middle class preferred long stems and the working class preferred short. Short stemmed pipes, sometimes called cuttys or nose warmers in England, were preferred by manual laborers as they could be gripped between the teeth, leaving both of the smoker's hands free.

Later low-quality clay pipes were made by slip casting in a mould. Higher quality pipes are made in a labour-intensive hand shaping process. Traditionally, clay pipes are unglazed. Clays burn "hot" in comparison to other types of pipes, so they are often difficult for most pipe-smokers to use. Their proponents claim that, unlike other materials, a well-made clay pipe gives a "pure" smoke with no flavour addition from the pipe bowl. In addition to aficionados, reproductions of historical clay styles are used by some historical re-enactors. Clay pipes were once very popular in Ireland, where they were called dudeens.

Broken fragments of clay pipe can be useful as dating evidence for archaeologists, known as clay pipe dating. English specialists can date a pipe to around a 20-year period. In the 1950s, the American archaeologist J. C. Harrington noted that the bore of pipe stems decreased over time, so a late sixteenth or early seventeenth centuries pipe would have a stem bore diameter of around 9/64 inch (3.6 mm), but a late eighteenth century pipe would have a bore diameter of around 4/64 inch (1.6 mm). The size of bowls also increased over time as tobacco became a cheaper commodity, and later pipes tend to be more decorated.

==== Corncob ====
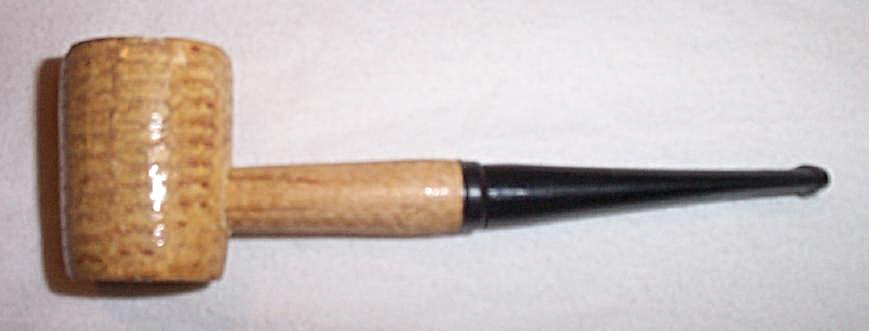
Corncob pipe

Made from corncobs, these pipes are cheap and effective at absorbing heat and moisture. After being dried for two years, the cobs are hollowed out to form a bowl shape, then either dipped in a plaster-based mixture or varnished or lacquered on the outside. Shanks made from birch wood are then inserted into the bowls.

The world's oldest and largest manufacturer of corncob pipes is Missouri Meerschaum, located in Washington, Missouri, where the company has produced the pipes since 1869. General Douglas MacArthur and Mark Twain were perhaps the most famous historical smokers of corncob pipes, as well as fictional cartoon characters Popeye and Frosty the Snowman.

Corncob pipes remain popular because they are inexpensive and require no "break-in" period like briar pipes, which means acquiring a layer of carbon in the pipe bowl. Owing to these factors, corncob pipes are often recommended as a "beginner's pipe" However, many seasoned pipe smokers enjoy the absorbing effect of the corn cob pipe, keeping tobaccos high in sugar like Virginias cool throughout the smoke. Additionally, pipesmokers who wish to sample different tobaccos and blends might keep a stock of corncobs on hand to permit them to try new flavors without "carryover" from an already-used pipe, sometimes called "ghosting," or to prevent a potentially bad-tasting tobacco from adding its flavor to a more expensive or favored pipe.

==== Meerschaum ====
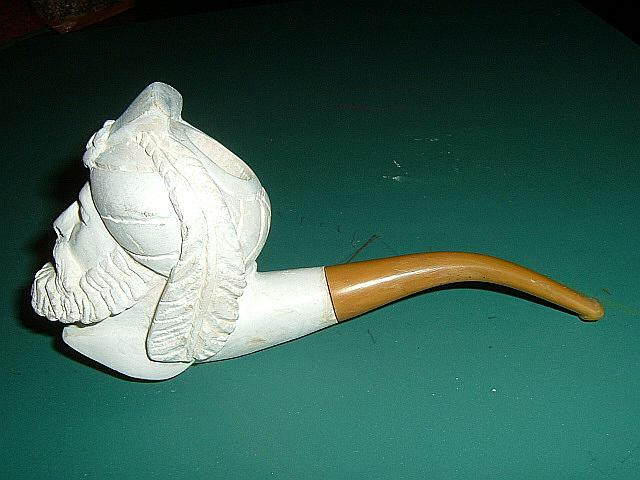
A meerschaum pipe

Meerschaum (hydrated magnesium silicate), a mineral found in small shallow deposits mainly around the city of Eskişehir in central Turkey, is prized for the properties which allow it to be carved into finely detailed decorative and figural shapes. It has been used since the 17th century and, with clay pipes, represented the most common medium for pipes before the introduction of briar as the material of choice in the 19th century. The word "meerschaum" means "sea foam" in German, alluding to its natural white color and its surprisingly low weight. Meerschaum is a very porous mineral that absorbs the tars and oils during the smoking process, and gradually changes color to a golden brown. Old, well-smoked meerschaum pipes are valued by collectors for their distinctive coloring.

Meerschaum pipes can either be carved from a block of meerschaum, or pressed from meerschaum dust collected after carving and mixed with an adhesive. The pressed meerschaum pipes are far less absorbent, color in blotches, and lack the smoking quality of the block carved pipe.

==== Synthetics ====
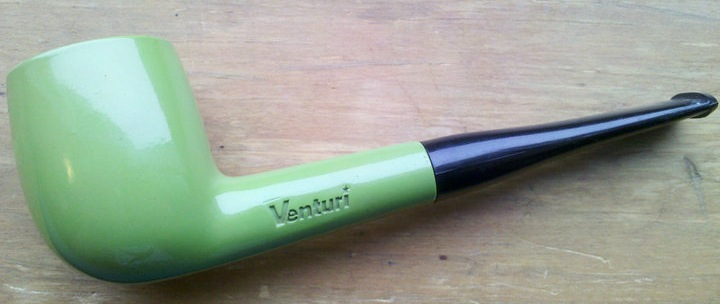
Venturi pipe of synthetic materials

A variety of other materials may also be used for pipes. The Redmanol corporation manufactured pipes with translucent stems in the 1920s and a series of pipes were manufactured and distributed by the Tar Gard (later Venturi) Corporation of San Francisco from 1965 to 1975. Marketed under names such as "the pipe", "The Smoke" and "Venturi", they used materials such as pyrolytic graphite, phenolic resin, nylon, Bakelite and other synthetics, allowing for higher temperatures in the bowl, reduced tar, and aesthetic variations of color and style. After Venturi stopped making pipes, several companies continue to make pipes from Brylon, a composite of nylon and wood flour, as a cheaper substitute for briar.

=== Types and shapes of pipe parts ===
==== Briar bowl finish types ====
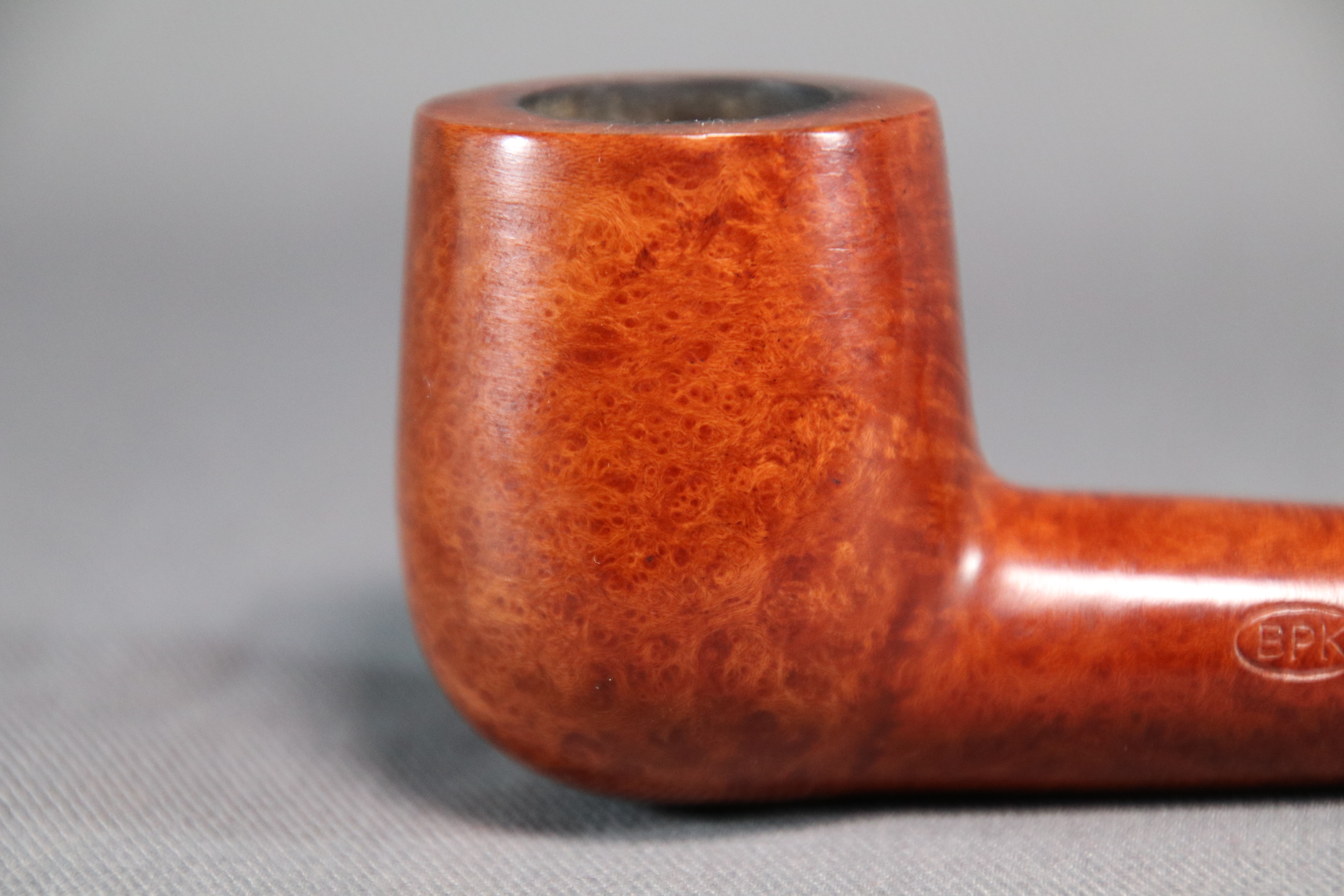
Smooth finish

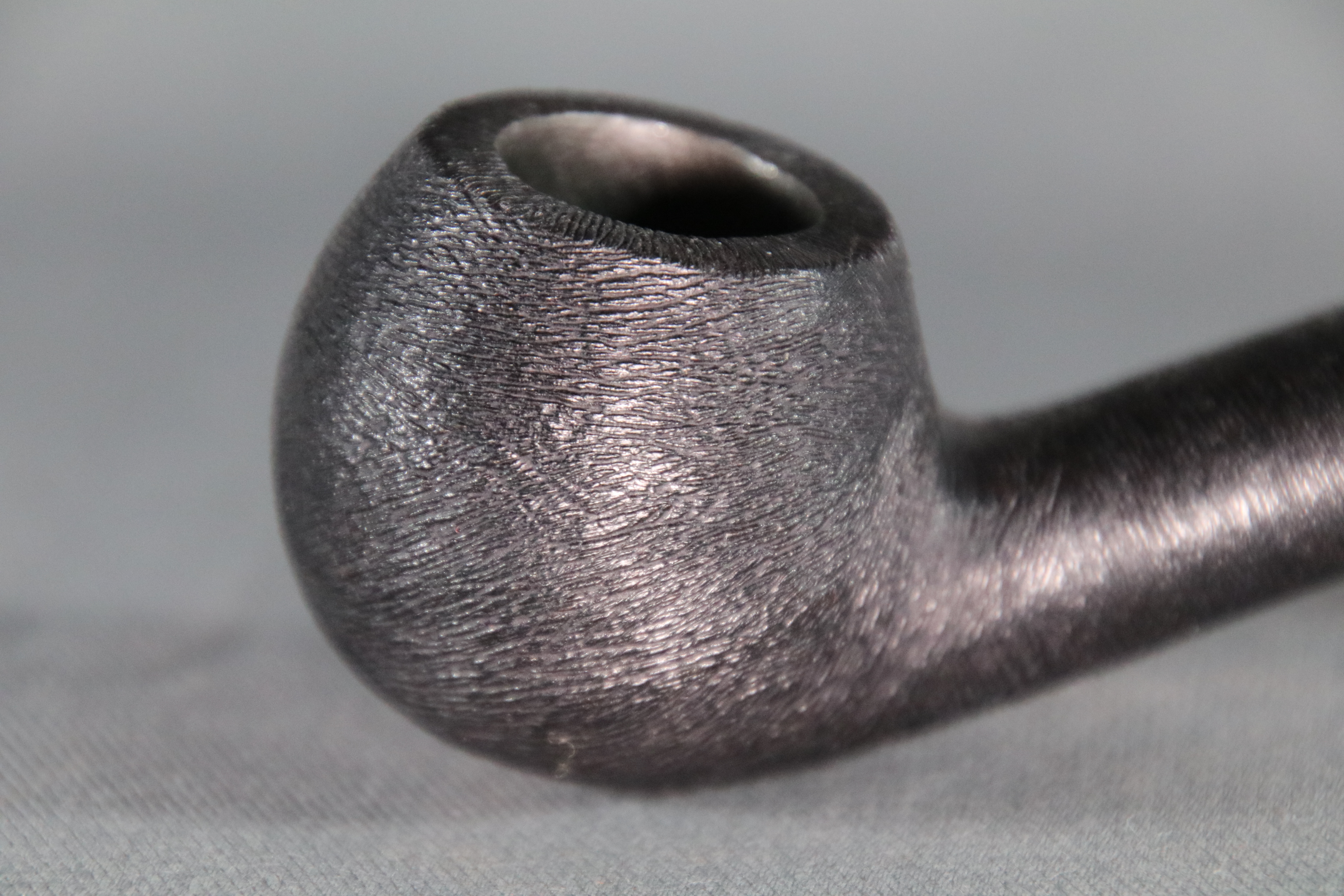
Brushed finish

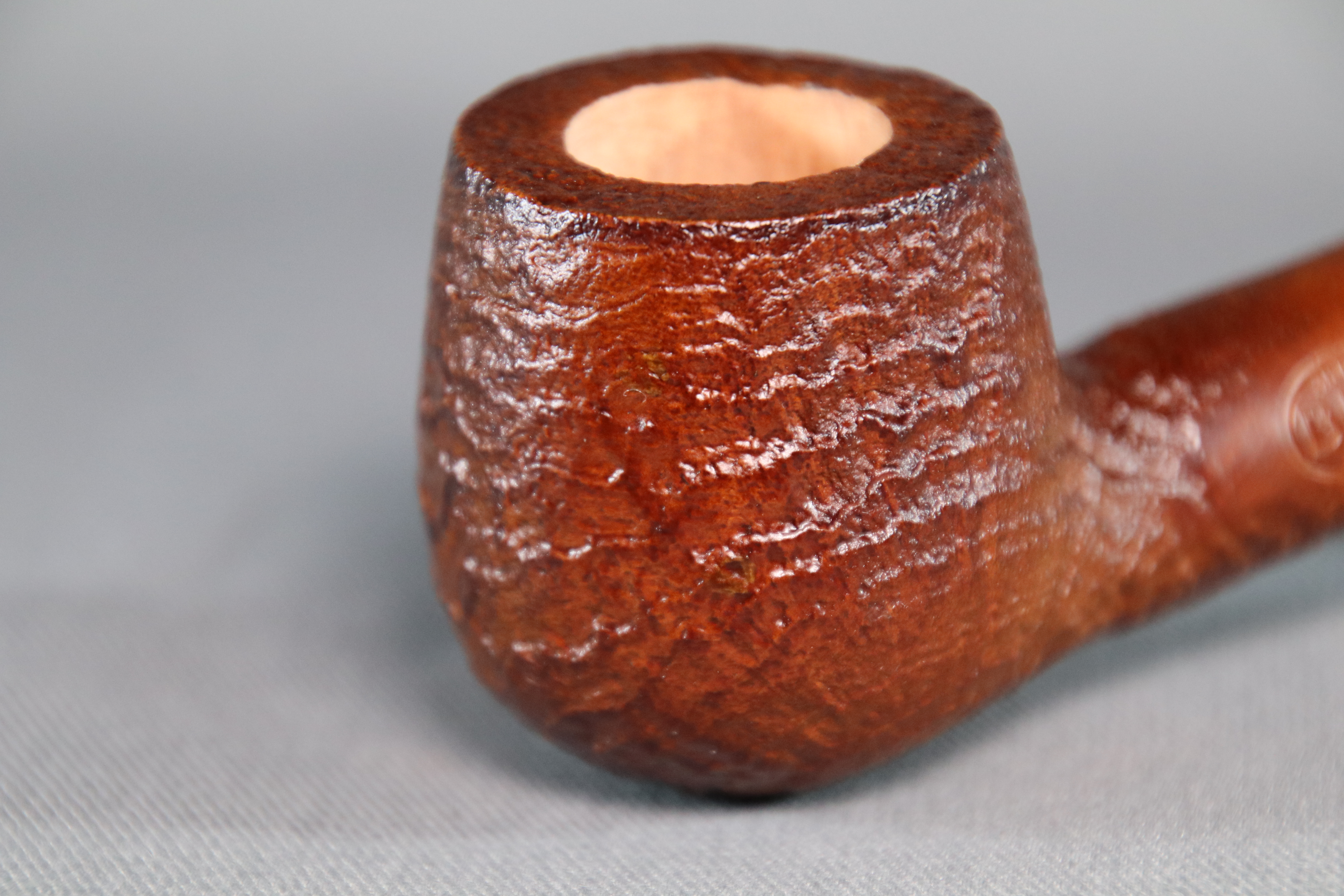
Sandblast finish

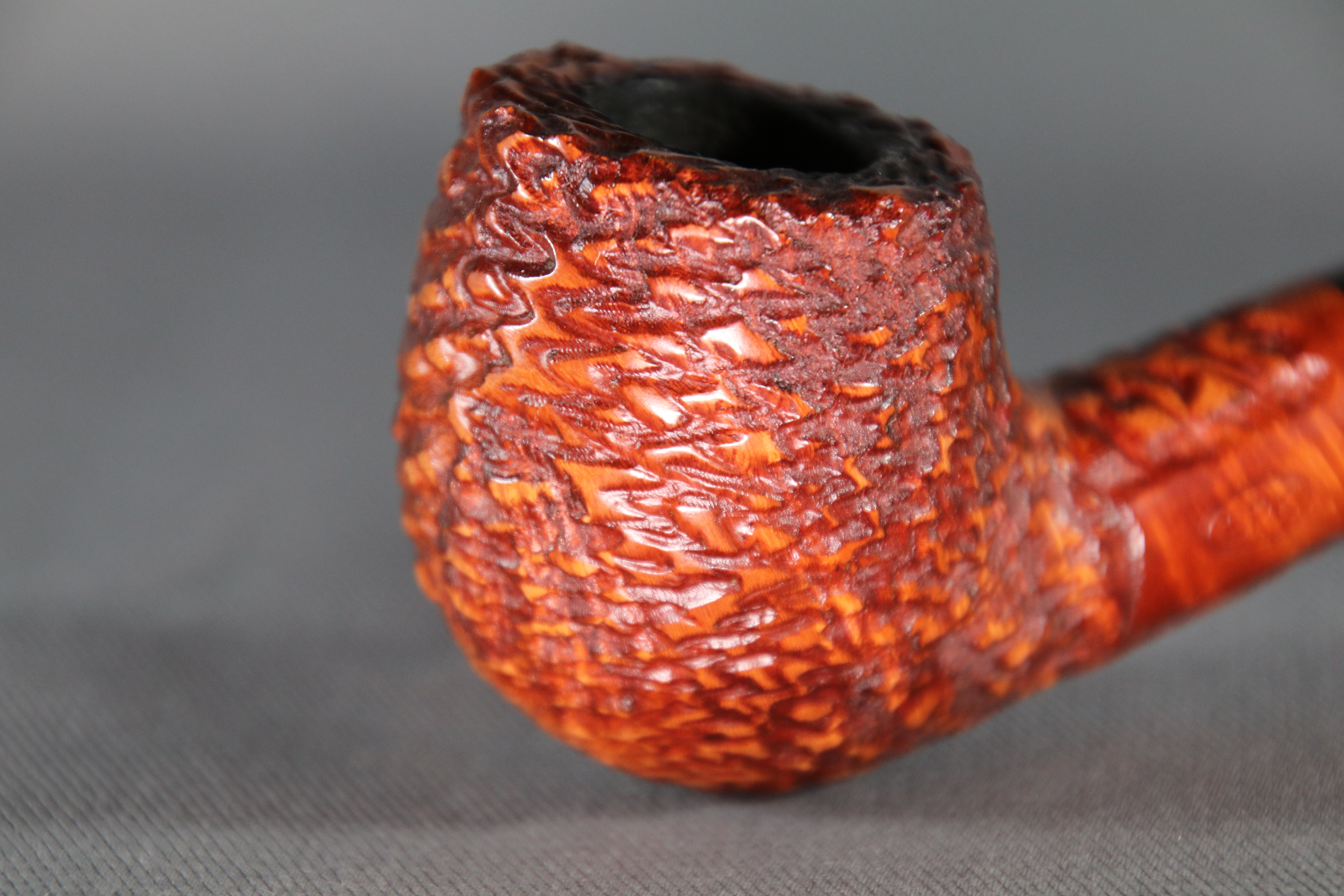
Rustic finish

- Brushed
- Carved
- Rustic
- Sandblast
- Smooth

==== Corn cob bowl finish types ====
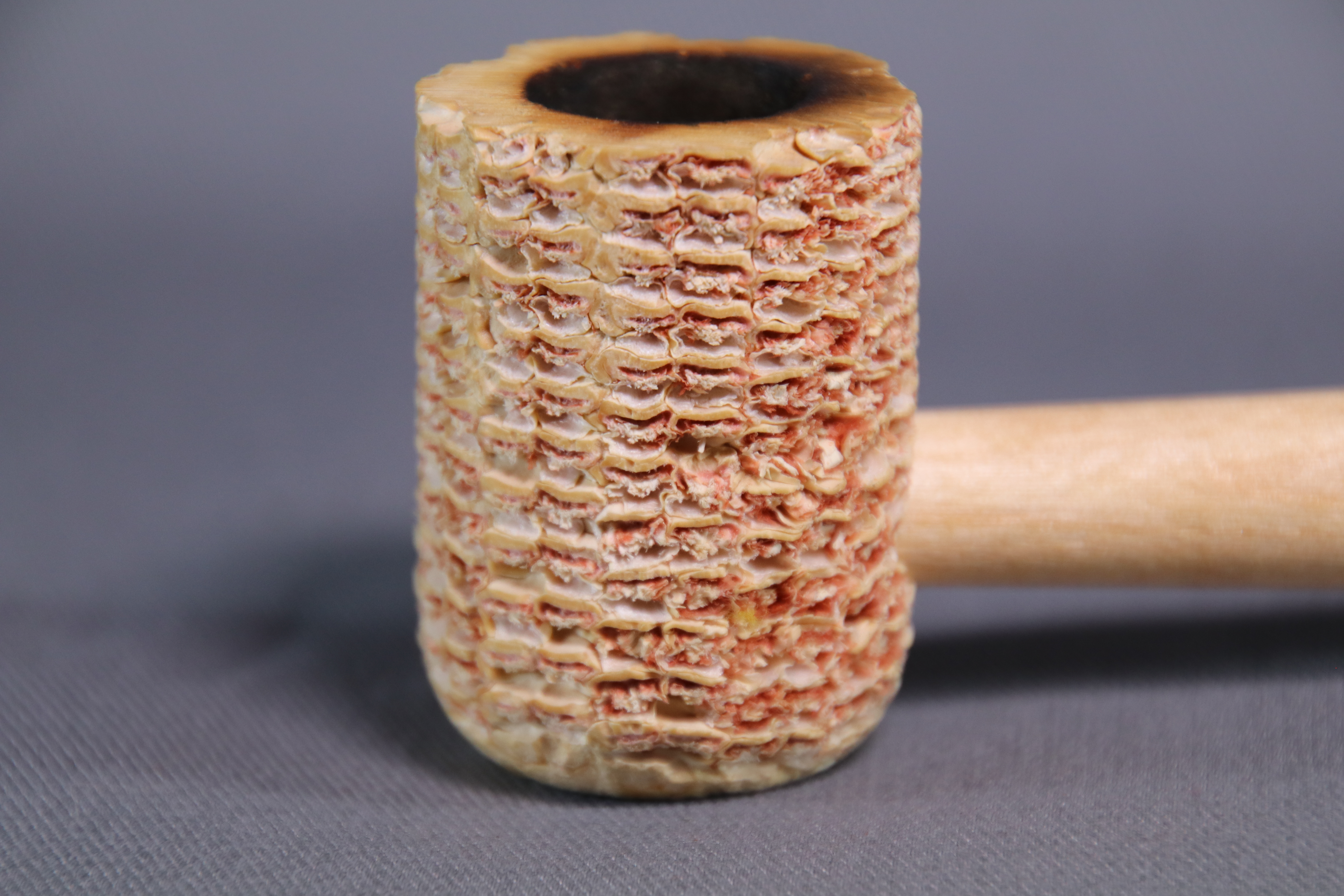
Natural finish

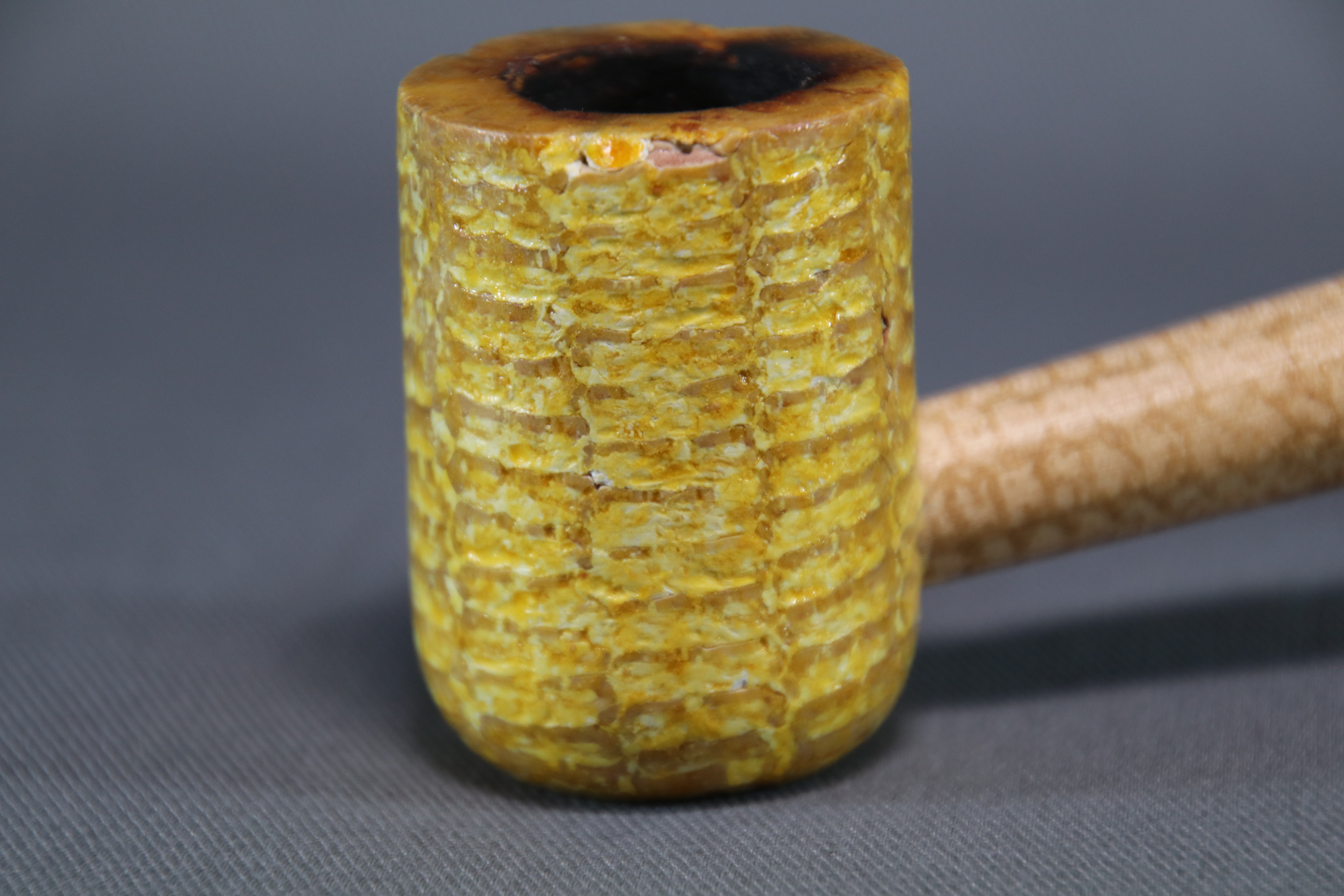
Polished finish

- Natural
- Stained
- Varnished (Polished)

==== Chamber types ====
- Important is size – diameter and depth.
- Chamber can be lined with other material, usually meerschaum or metal.

==== Tenon shapes ====
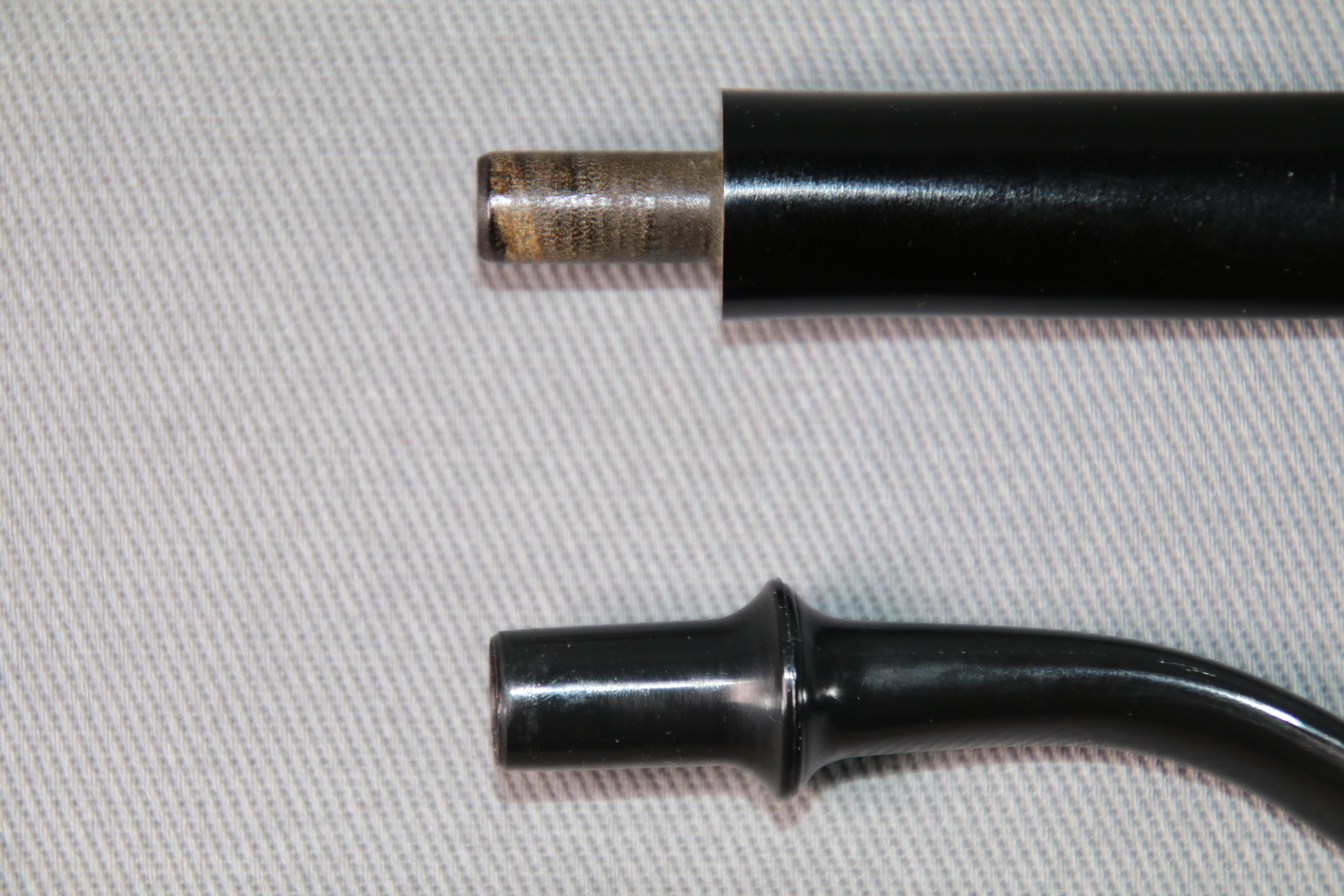
Standard (up) and Army tenon shape

- Army – Enables the pipe smoker to remove the stem from the shank while hot without fear of warping. Is often seen with a metal band, sometimes referred to as a ferrule, around the shank.
- Screw – Also allows for the immediate removal of the stem from the shank for cleaning while still hot. Often seen on pipes with stingers, allowing the pipe smoker to clean the stinger while still hot, making the task much easier.
- Standard

==== Filter types ====
Filter types

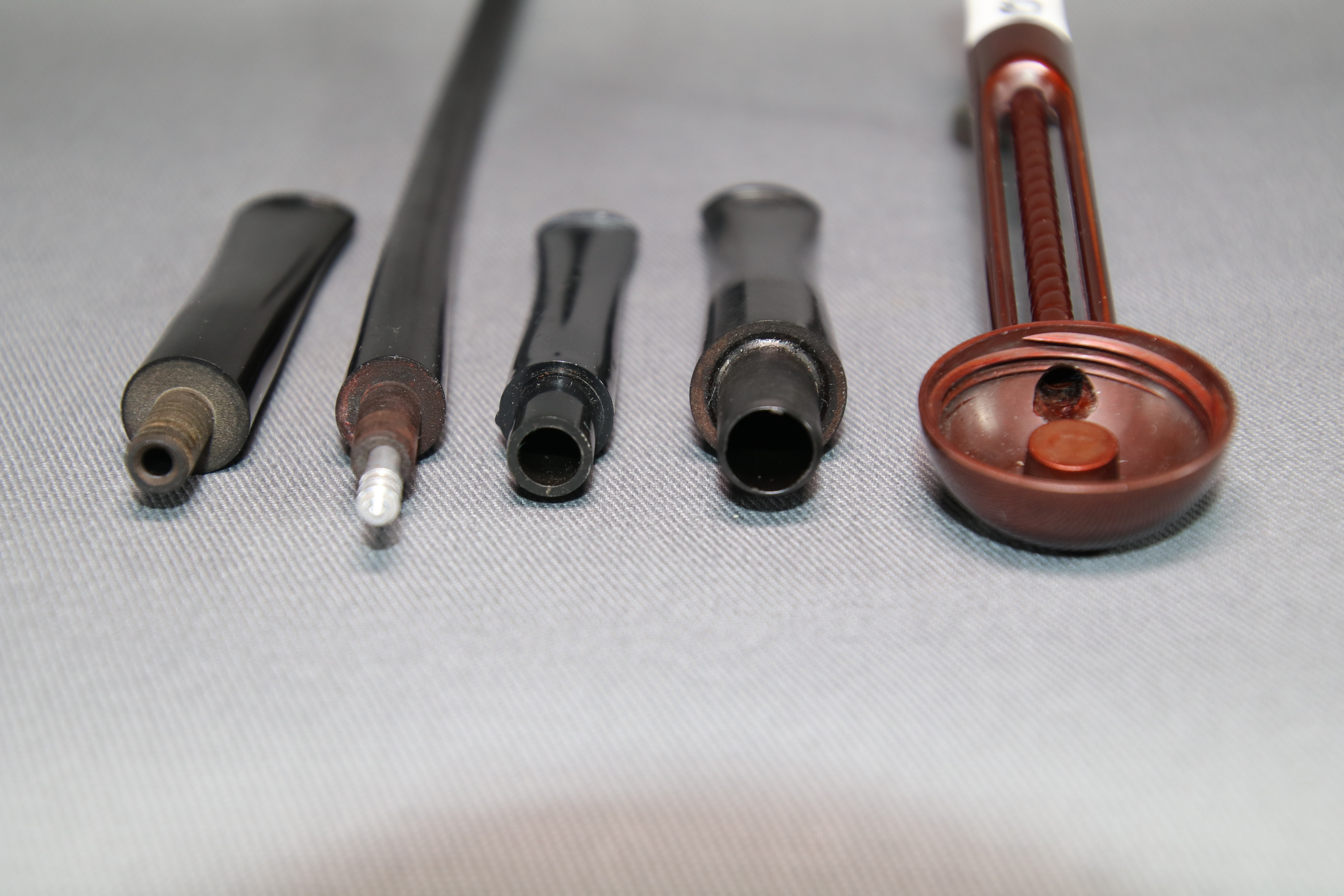
None (left), cooler, 6 mm, 9 mm, Falcon dry ring

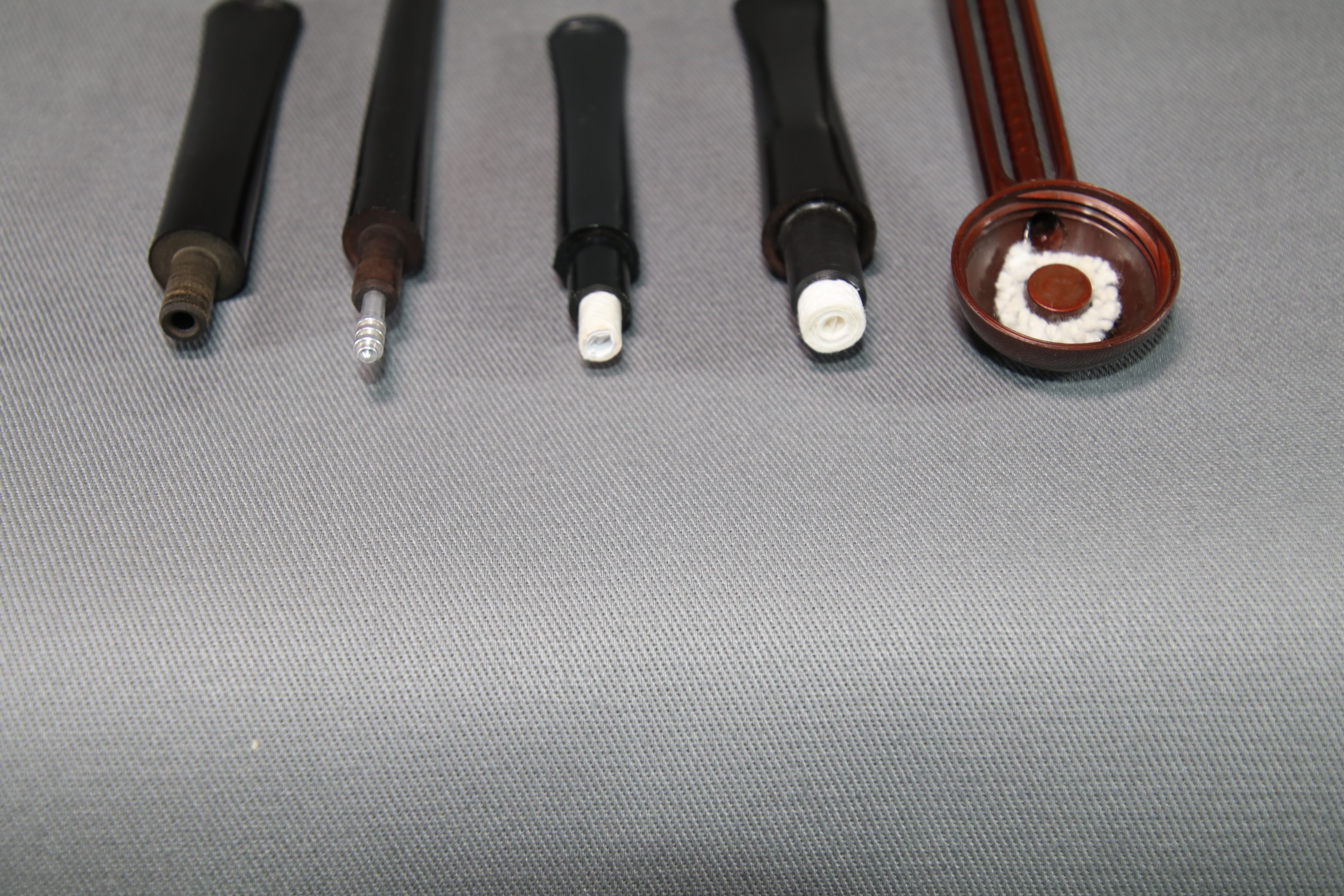
None (left), cooler, 6 mm inserted, 9 mm inserted, Falcon dry ring inserted

- None
- Cooler (Stinger)
- 6 mm
- 9 mm
- Other, e.g. Falcon dry ring.

==== Stem materials ====
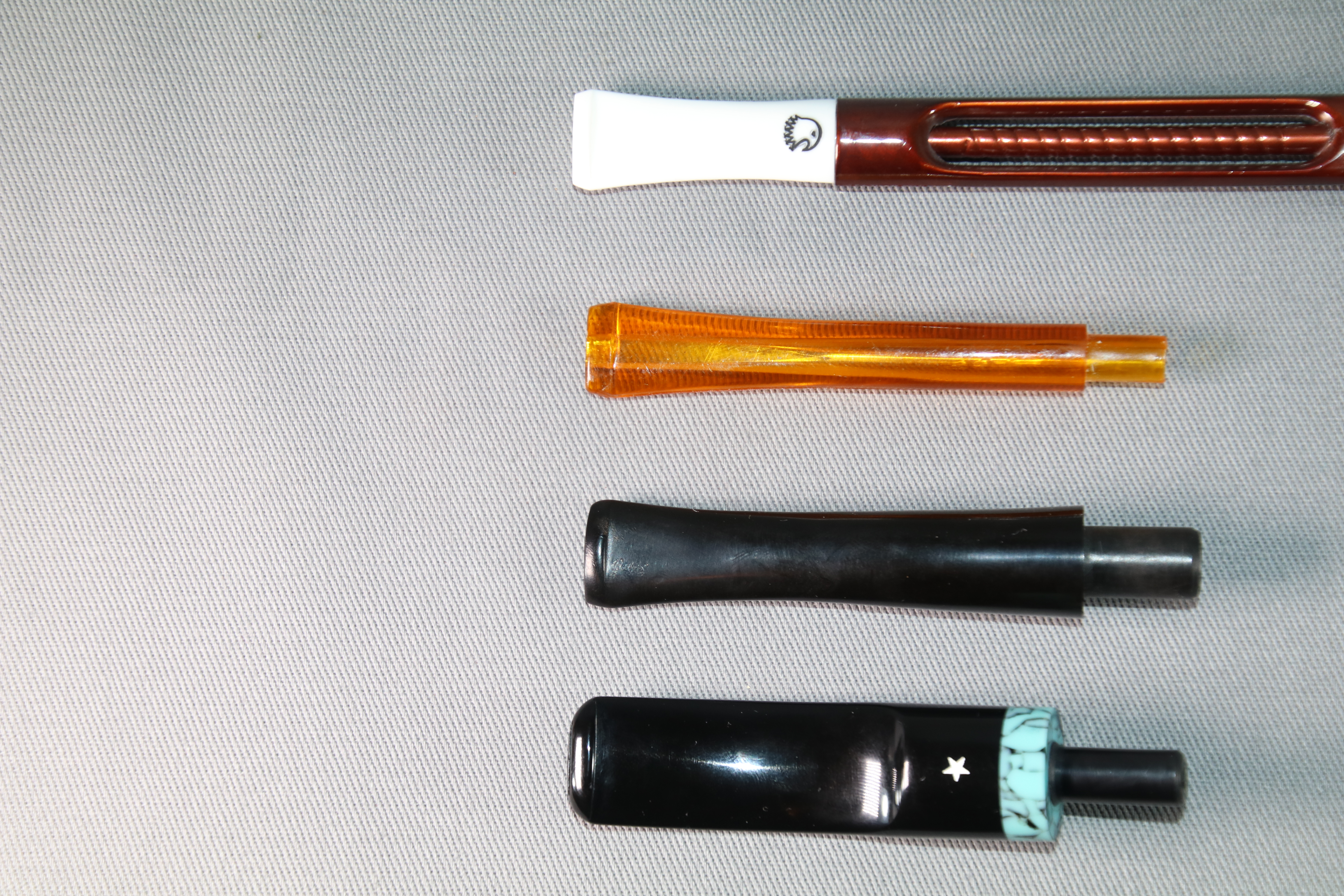
Anodized aluminium with white plastic bit (up), amber plastic, ebonite and acrylic stems

- Acrylic
- Amber
- Bakelite
- Cumberland (Brindle)
- Ebonite
- Horn (Keratin)
- Plastic
- Metal, e.g. Aluminium. Metal stem serves as a heat sink.

==== Stem shapes ====
Stem shapes and curvatures

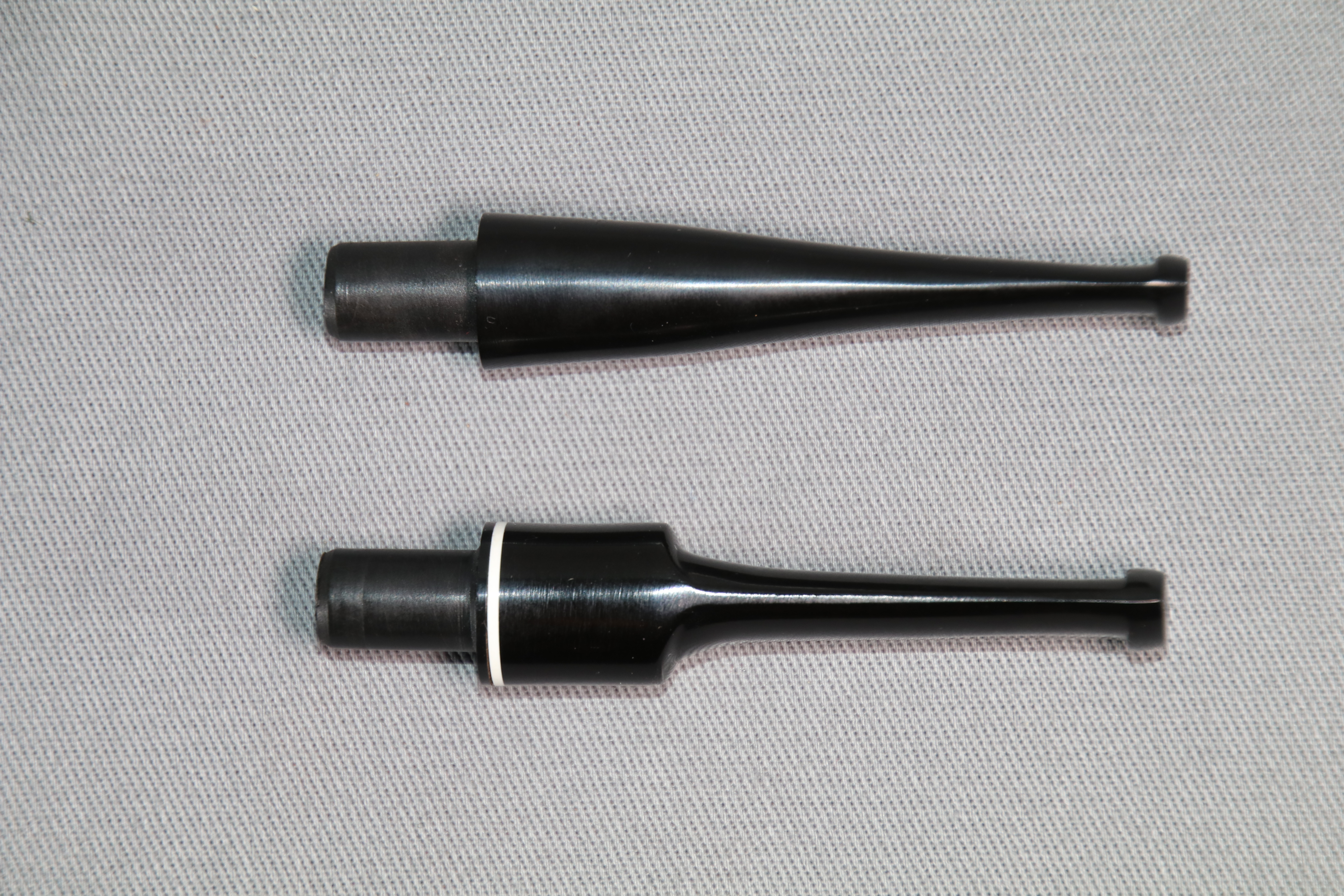
Tapered (top) and saddle stem

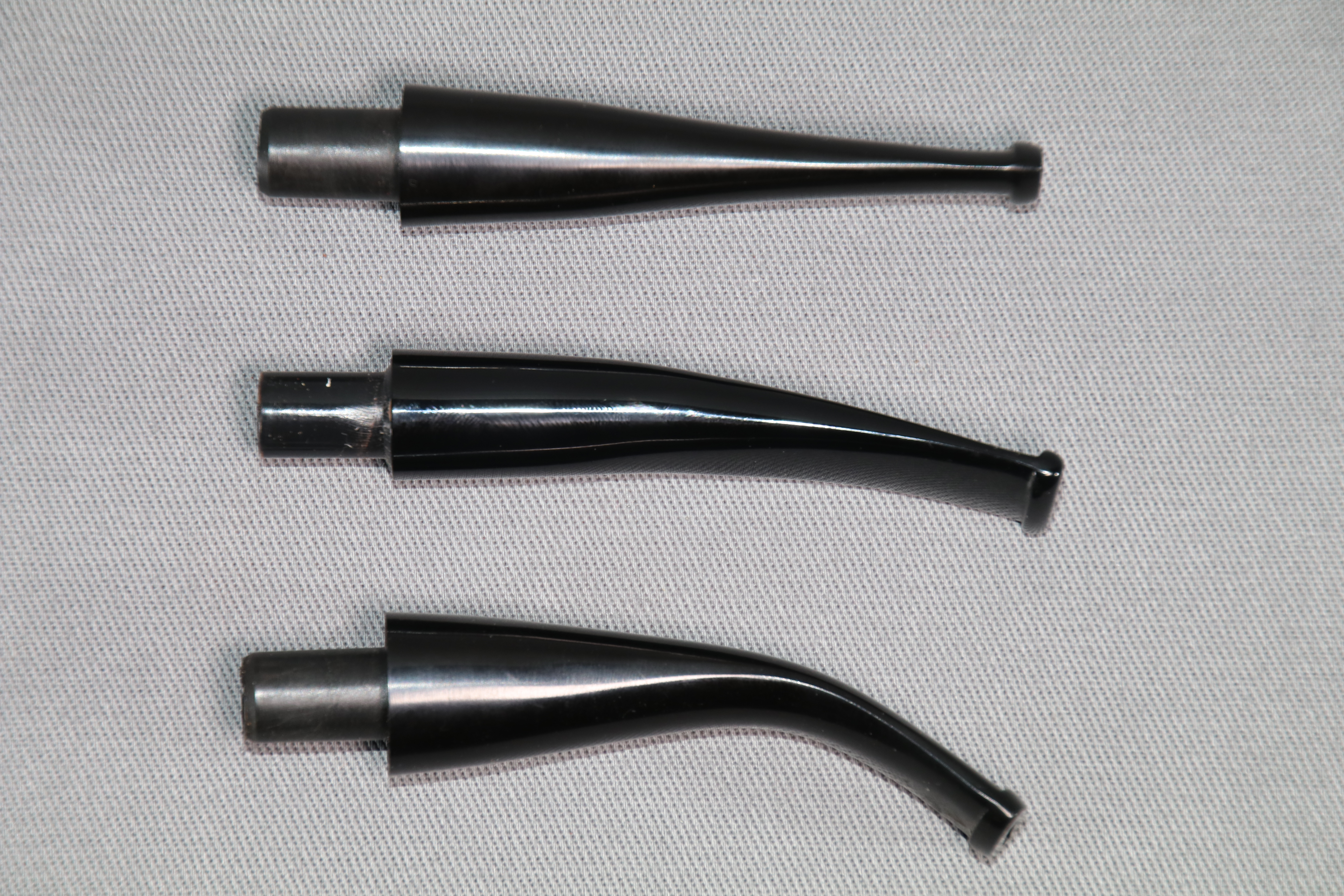
Straight (top), slightly bent and bent stem

- Combination
- Saddle
- Tapered

==== Stem curvatures ====
- Straight
- Slightly bent (semi-straight, half bent)
- Bent

==== Bit shapes ====
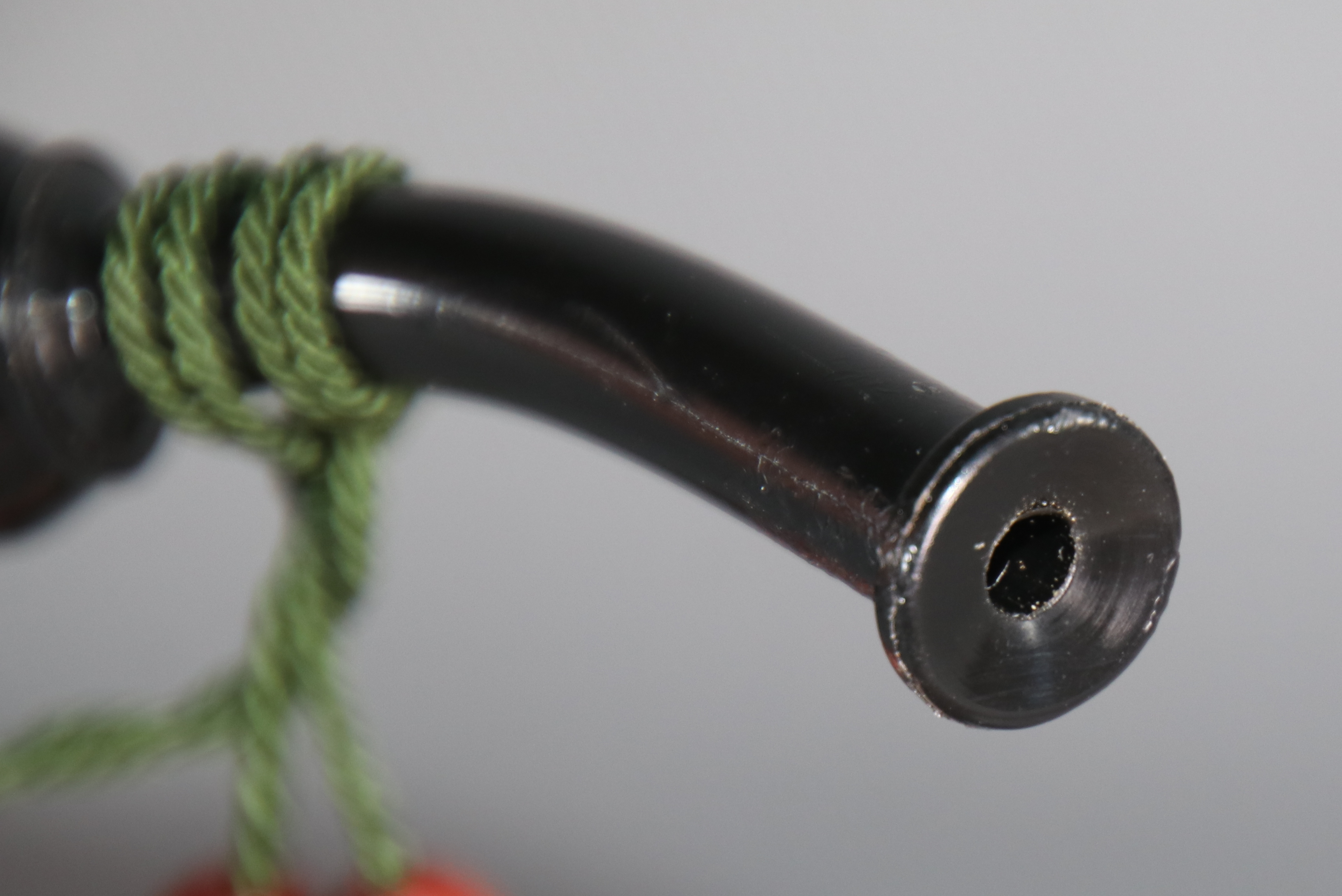
Standard bit

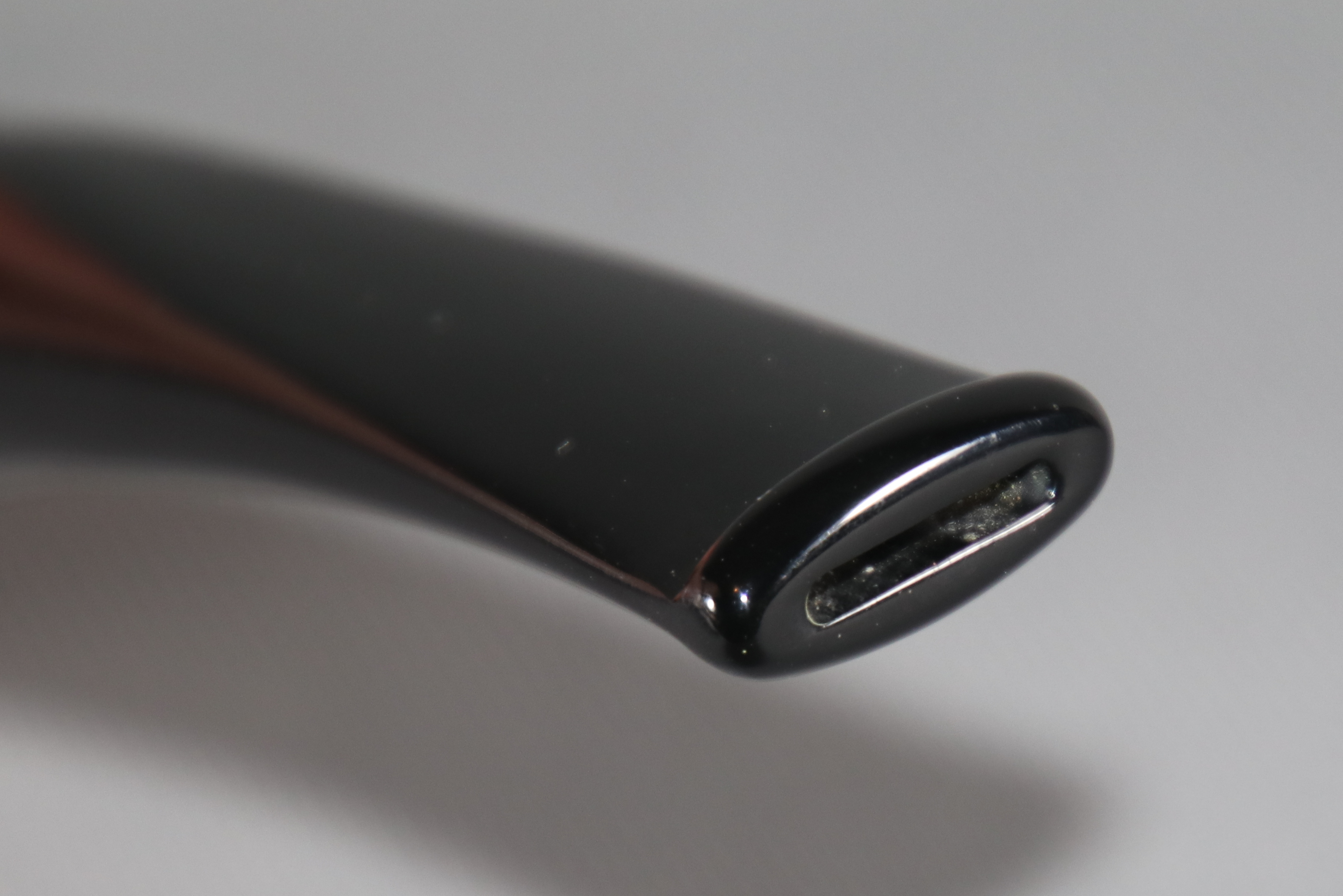
Fishtail bit

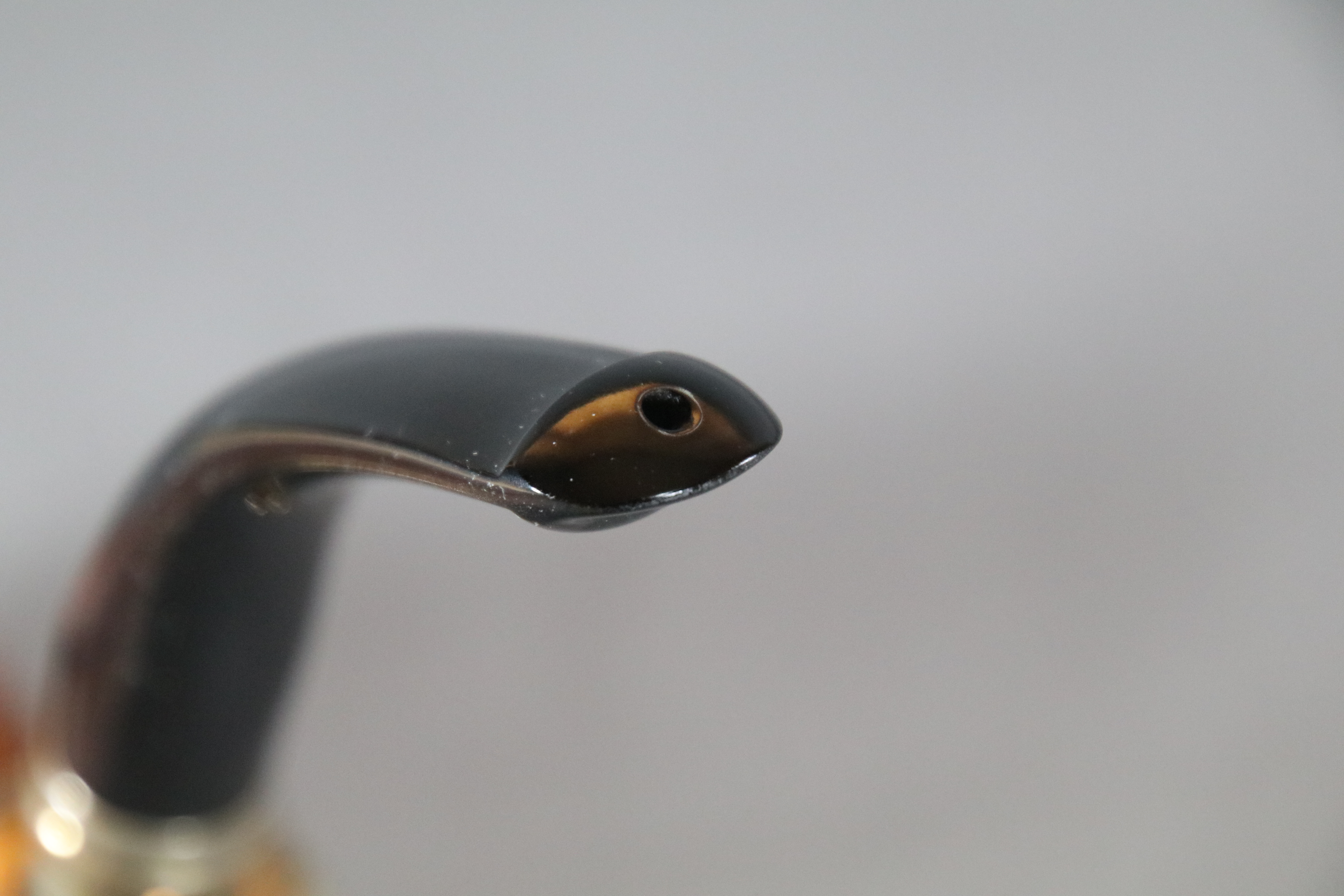
P-lip bit

- Denture
- Fishtail
- P-lip
- Standard

==== Bit sizes ====
- Regular (single bore)
- Double bore
- Wide comfort
- Double comfort

== Accessories ==
=== Filters ===
Used to absorb moisture, tar and nicotine. Made of:

- Paper
- Balsa wood
- Meerschaum
- Charcoal (activated carbon)
- Other, e.g. Falcon dry ring or Denicool filter crystals.

Filters can be single- or double-sided. Double-sided filter has both ends ceramic that can withstand hot smoke. Single-sided filter has ceramic end to the bowl and plastic end to the stem.

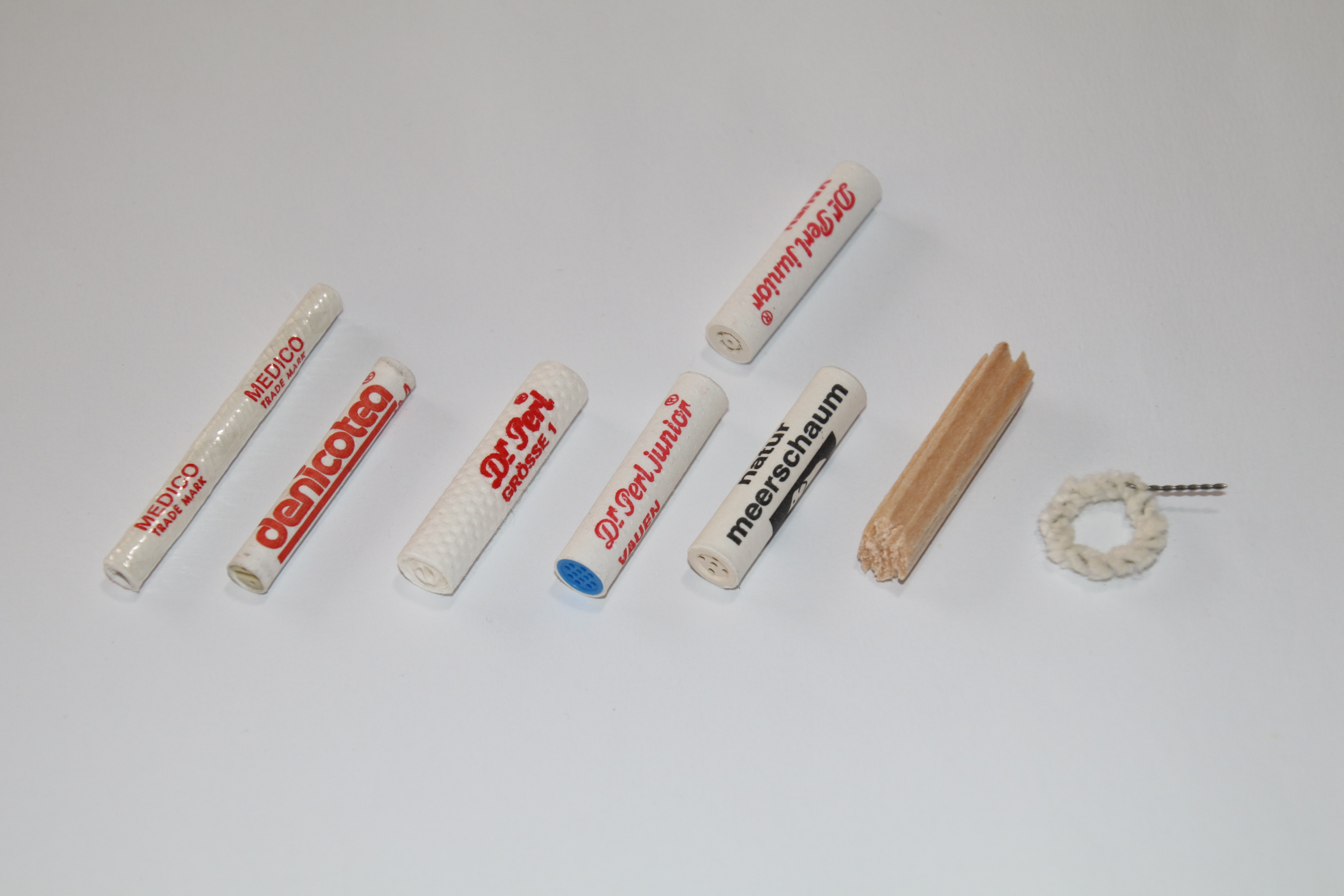
Smoking pipe filters. Left to right: 6 mm paper. 6 mm charcoal. 9 mm paper. 9 mm charcoal one-sided. 9 mm meerschaum. 9 mm balsa wood. Falcon dry ring.

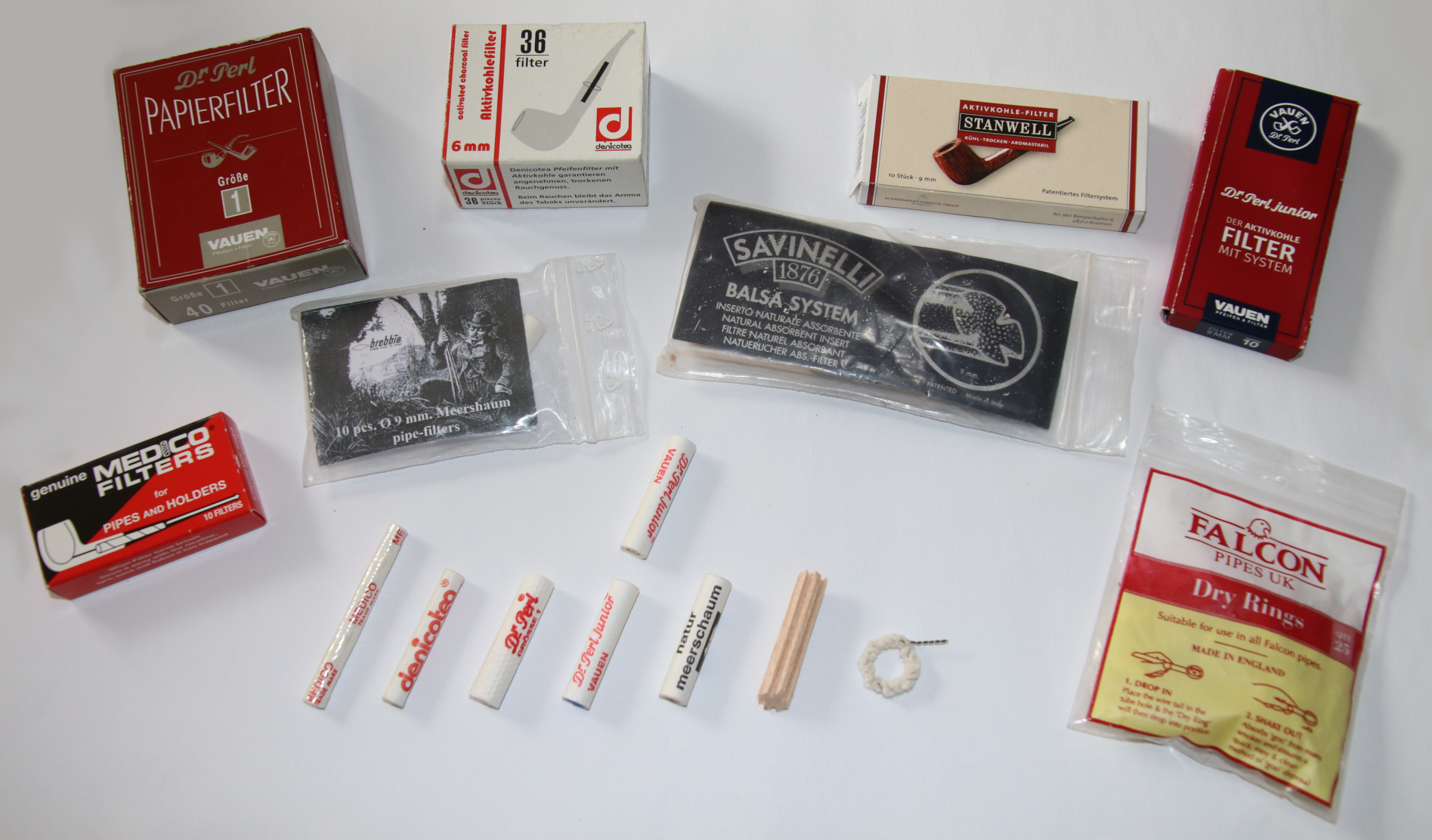
Smoking pipe filters.

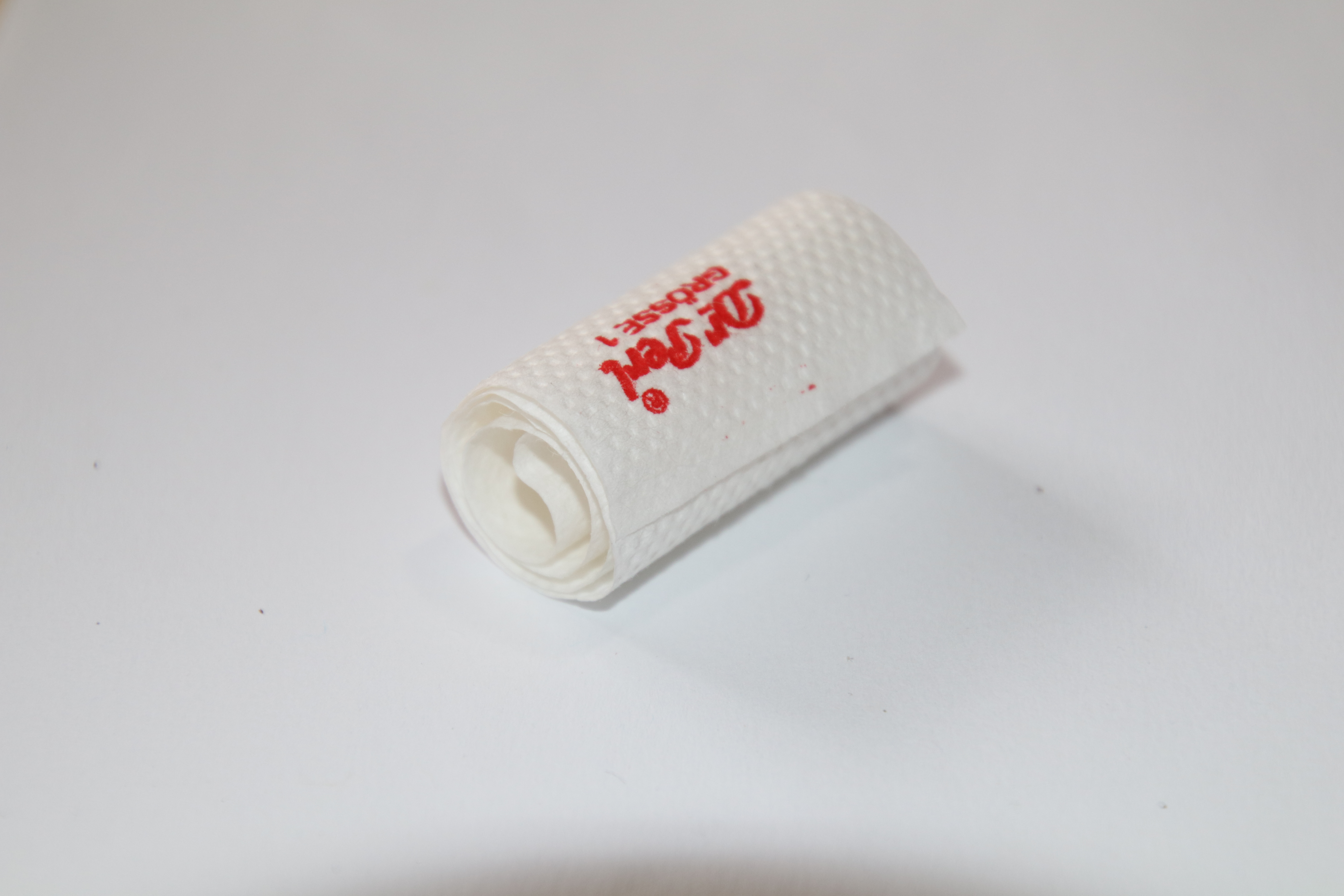
Disassembled smoking pipe filter. 9 mm paper.

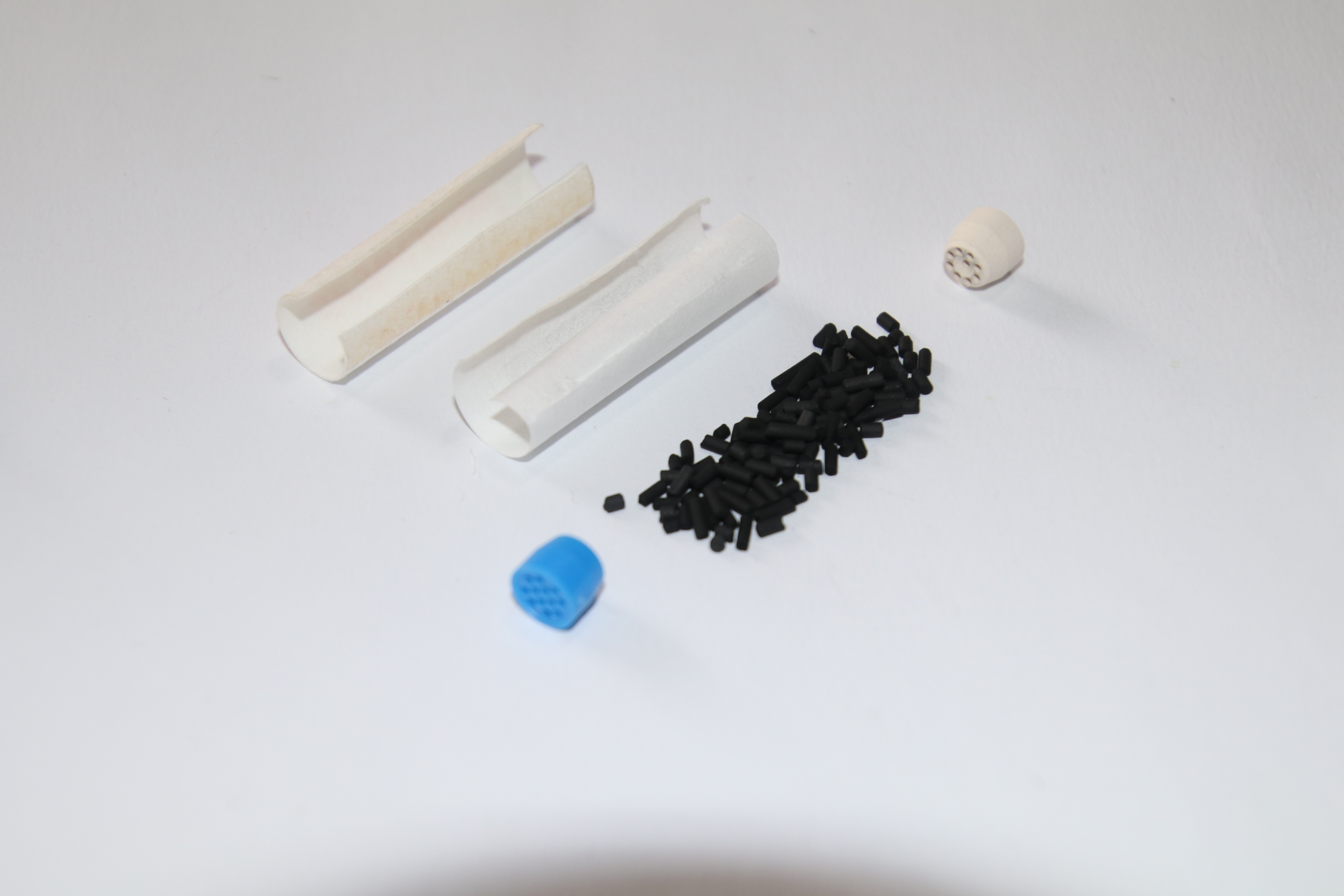
Disassembled smoking pipe filter. 9 mm charcoal. One-sided.

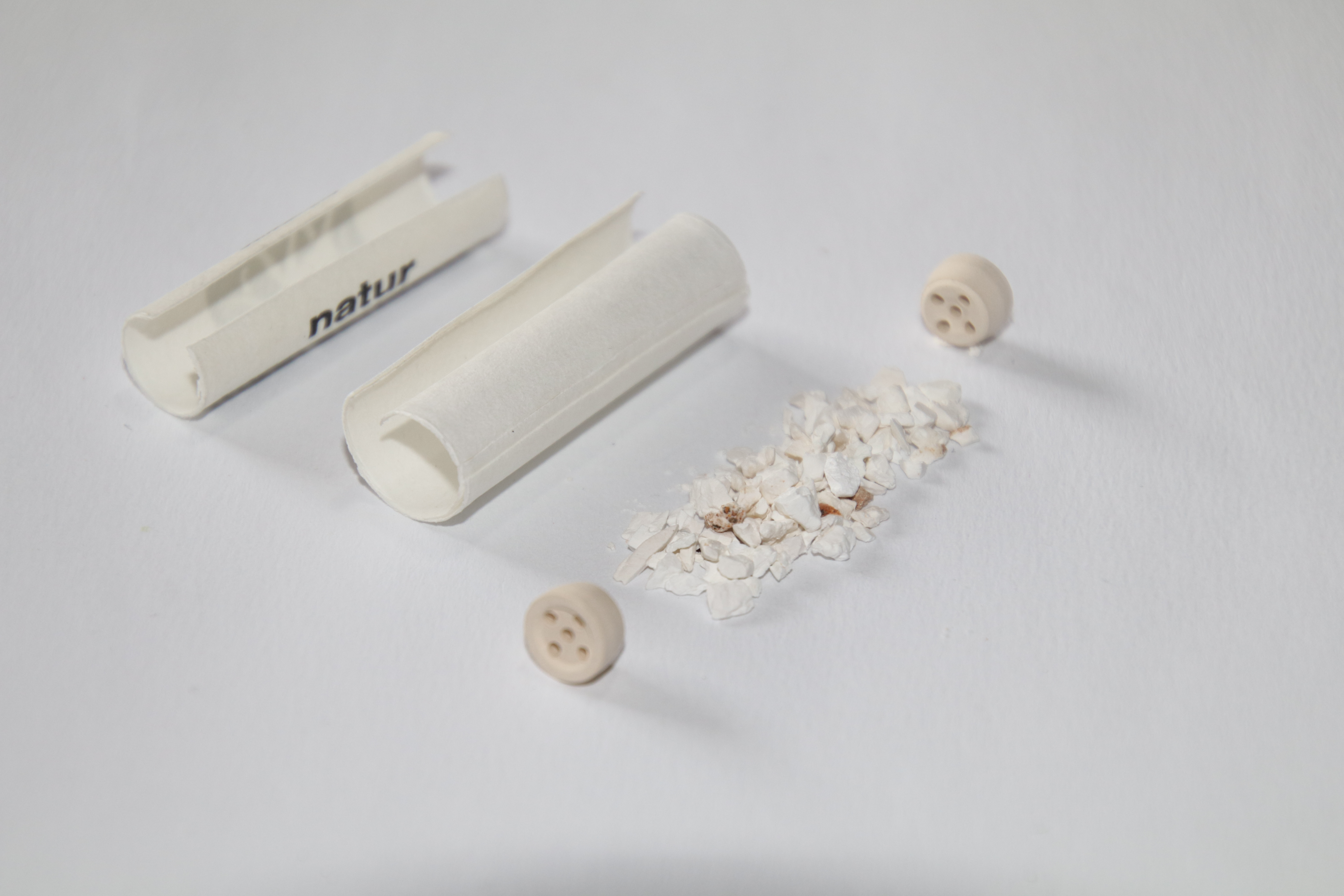
Disassembled smoking pipe filter. 9 mm meerschaum.

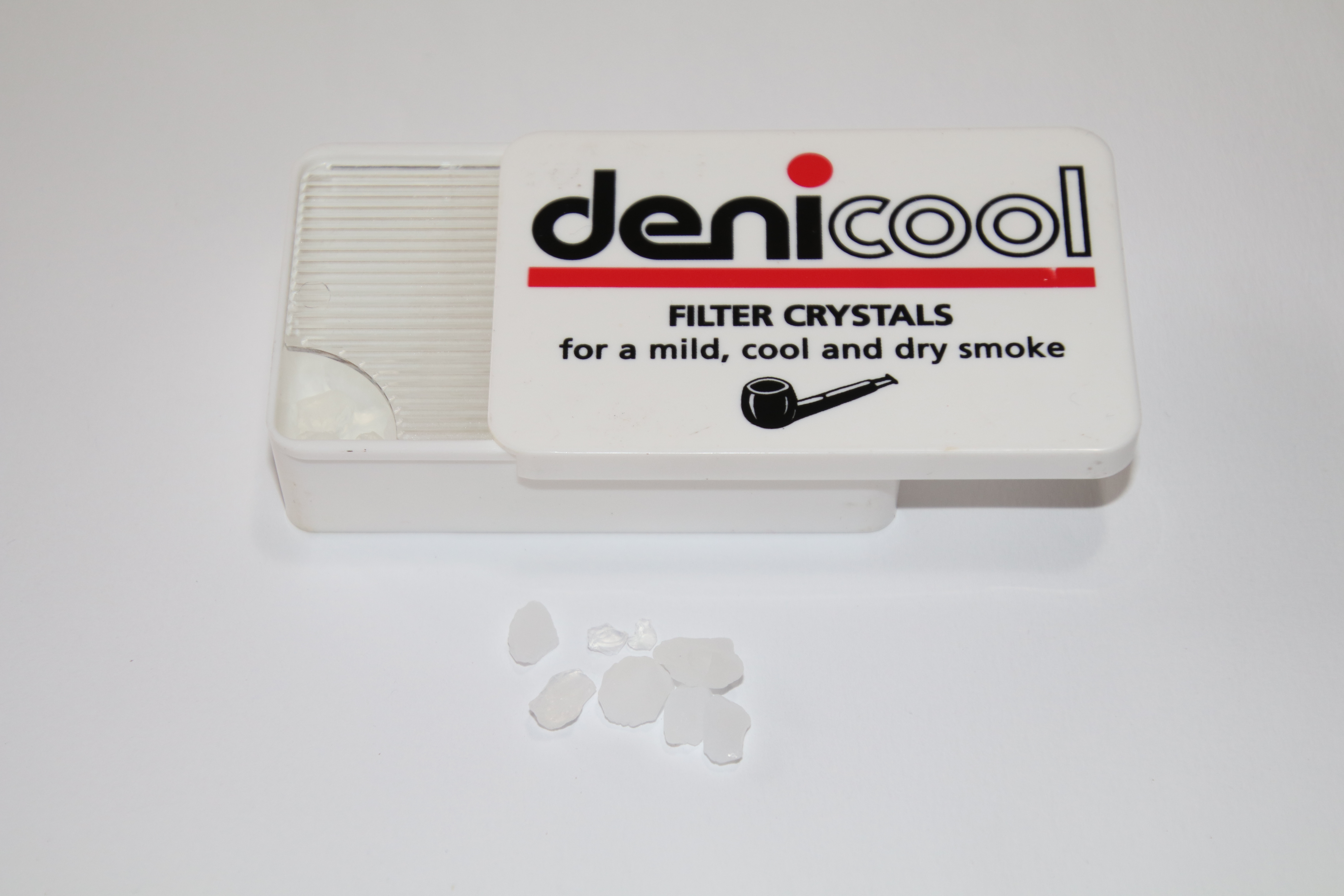
Smoking pipe filter crystals.

== Use ==
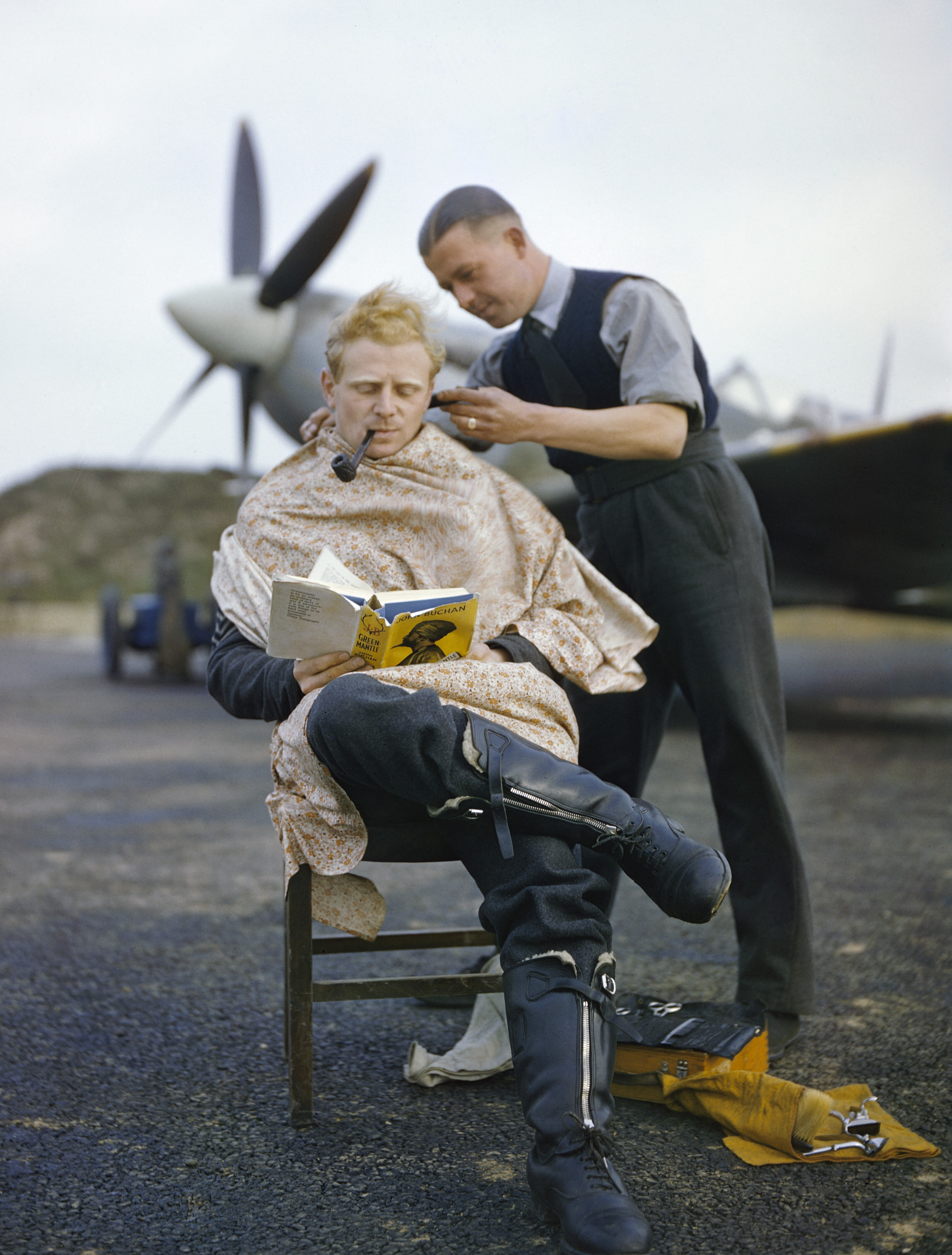
A pilot smoking a pipe while receiving a haircut, 1942

Smoking a pipe involves more equipment and technique than smoking cigarettes or cigars. In addition to the pipe and a source of ignition like matches or a pipe lighter, pipe smokers typically use a pipe tool for packing, adjusting, and emptying tobacco from the bowl, along with a regular supply of pipe cleaners to maintain the pipe. In 18th-century North America, smokers used a "tobacco-stopper" to press tobacco into the pipe's bowl, with some of these stoppers made from bones, such as those extracted from the penis of raccoons (known as a baculum), reflecting the resourcefulness of the era's material culture.

=== Tobacco ===
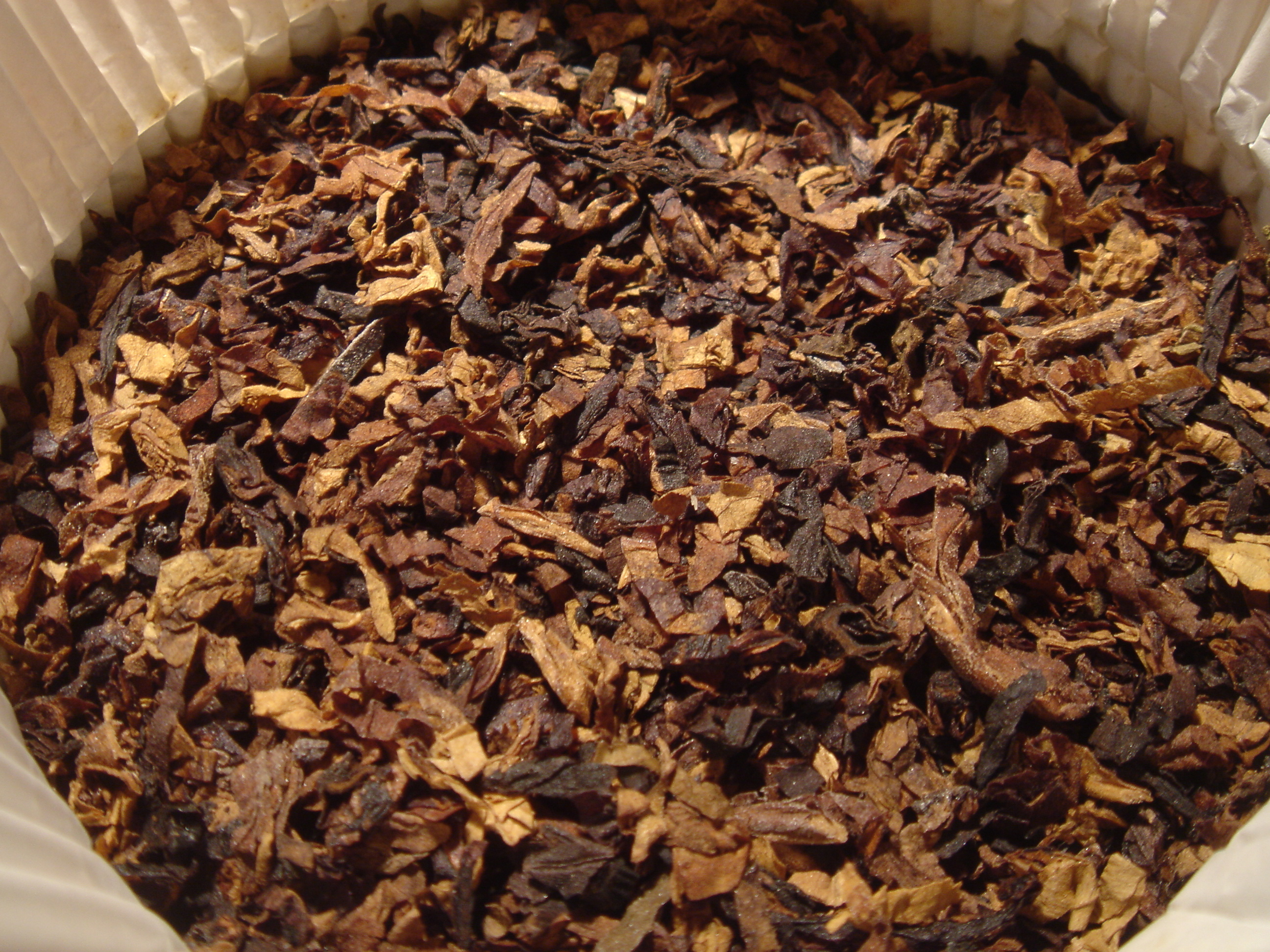
A typical ready-rubbed pipe tobacco, sold in a tin

Tobacco for smoking in pipes are often carefully treated and blended to achieve flavour nuances not available in other tobacco products. Many of these are blends using staple ingredients of variously cured Burley and Virginia tobaccos which are enhanced by spice tobaccos, among them many Oriental or Balkan varietals, Latakia (a fire-cured spice tobacco of Syrian origin, but now made in other regions, such as, Cyprus and Lebanon), Perique (uniquely grown in St. James Parish, Louisiana) which is also an old method of fermentation, or blends of Virginia and Burley tobaccos of African, Indian, or South American origins. Traditionally, many U.S. blends are made of American Burley with sweeteners and flavorings added to create an "aromatic" flavor, whereas "English" blends are based on natural Virginia tobaccos enhanced with Oriental and other natural tobaccos. There is a growing tendency towards "natural" tobaccos which derive their aromas from artful blending with selected spice tobaccos only and careful, often historically-based, curing processes.

Pipe tobacco can be purchased in several forms, which vary both in flavour (leading to many blends and opportunities for smokers to blend their own tobaccos) and in the physical shape and size to which the tobacco has been reduced. Most pipe tobaccos are less mild than cigarette tobacco, substantially more moist and cut much more coarsely. Too finely cut tobacco does not allow enough air to flow through the pipe, and overly dry tobacco burns too quickly with little flavour. Pipe tobacco must be kept in an airtight container, such as a canning jar or sealed tin, to keep from drying out.

Some pipe tobaccos are cut into long narrow ribbons. Some are pressed into flat plugs which are sliced into flakes. Others are tightly wound into long ropes, then sliced into discs. Plug tobacco is maintained in its pressed block form and sold in small blocks. The plug will be sliced into thin flakes by the smoker and then prepared in a similar fashion to flake tobacco. It is considered that plug tobacco holds its flavor better than rubbed or flake tobacco. Flake tobacco (sliced cakes or ropes) may be prepared in several ways. Generally it is rubbed out with the fingers and palms until it is loose enough to pack. It can also be crumbled or simply folded and stuffed into a pipe. Some people also prefer to dice up very coarse tobaccos before using them, making them easier to pack.

=== Packing ===
In the most common method of packing, tobacco is added to the bowl of the pipe in several batches, each one pressed down until the mixture has a uniform density that optimizes airflow (something that it is difficult to gauge without practice). This can be done with a finger or thumb, but if the tobacco needs to be repacked later, while it is burning, the tamper on a pipe tool is sometimes used. If it needs to be loosened, the reamer, or any similar long pin can be used. A traditional way of packing the pipe is to fill the bowl and then pack gently to about 1/3 full, fill again and pack slightly more firmly to about 2/3 full, and then pack more firmly still to the top.

An alternative packing technique called the Frank method involves lightly dropping tobacco in the pipe, after which a large plug is gingerly pushed into the bowl all at once.

=== Lighting ===
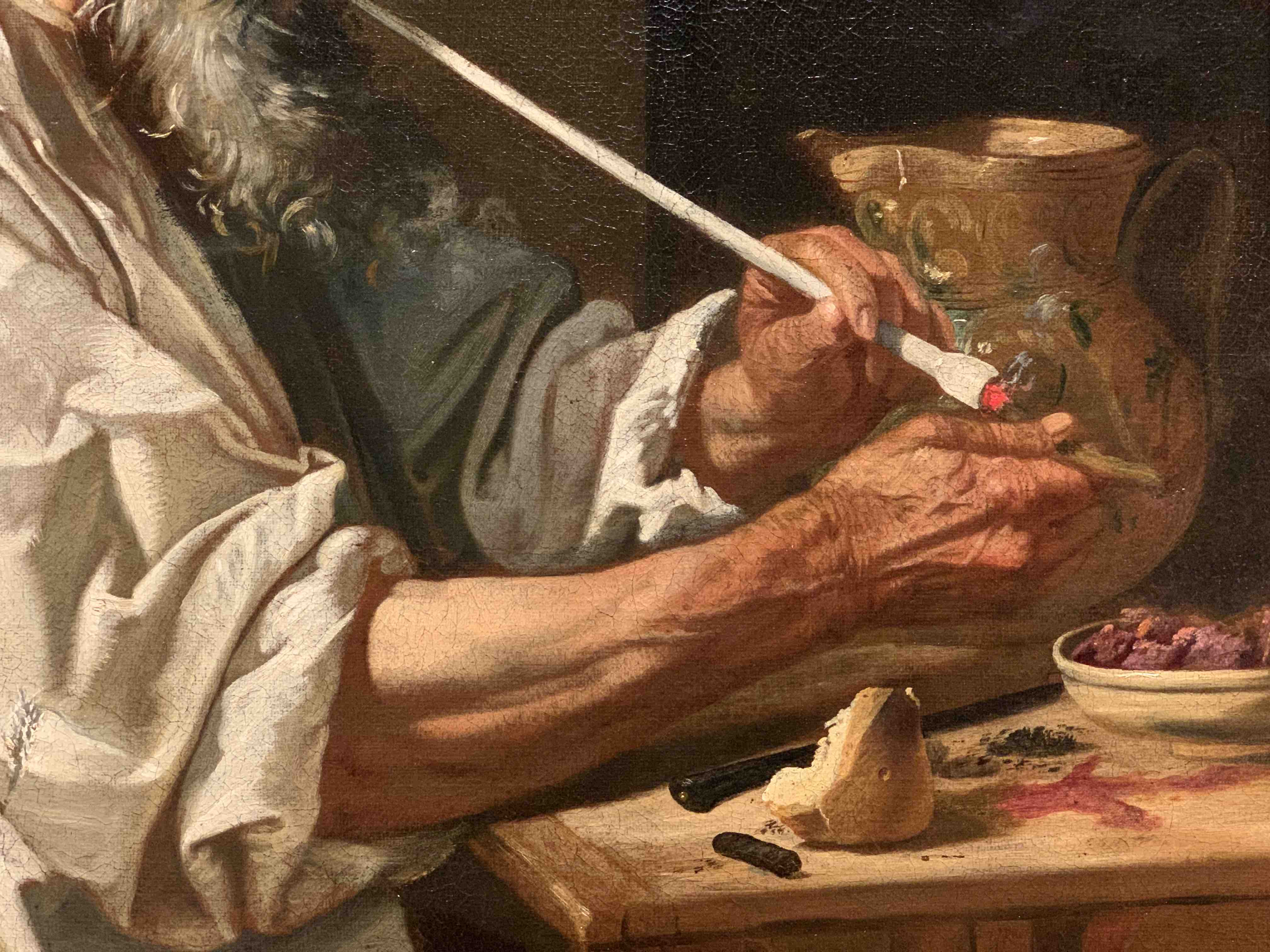
Detail of "Old Peasant Lighting a Pipe" by Johann Carl Loth (1655/1660)

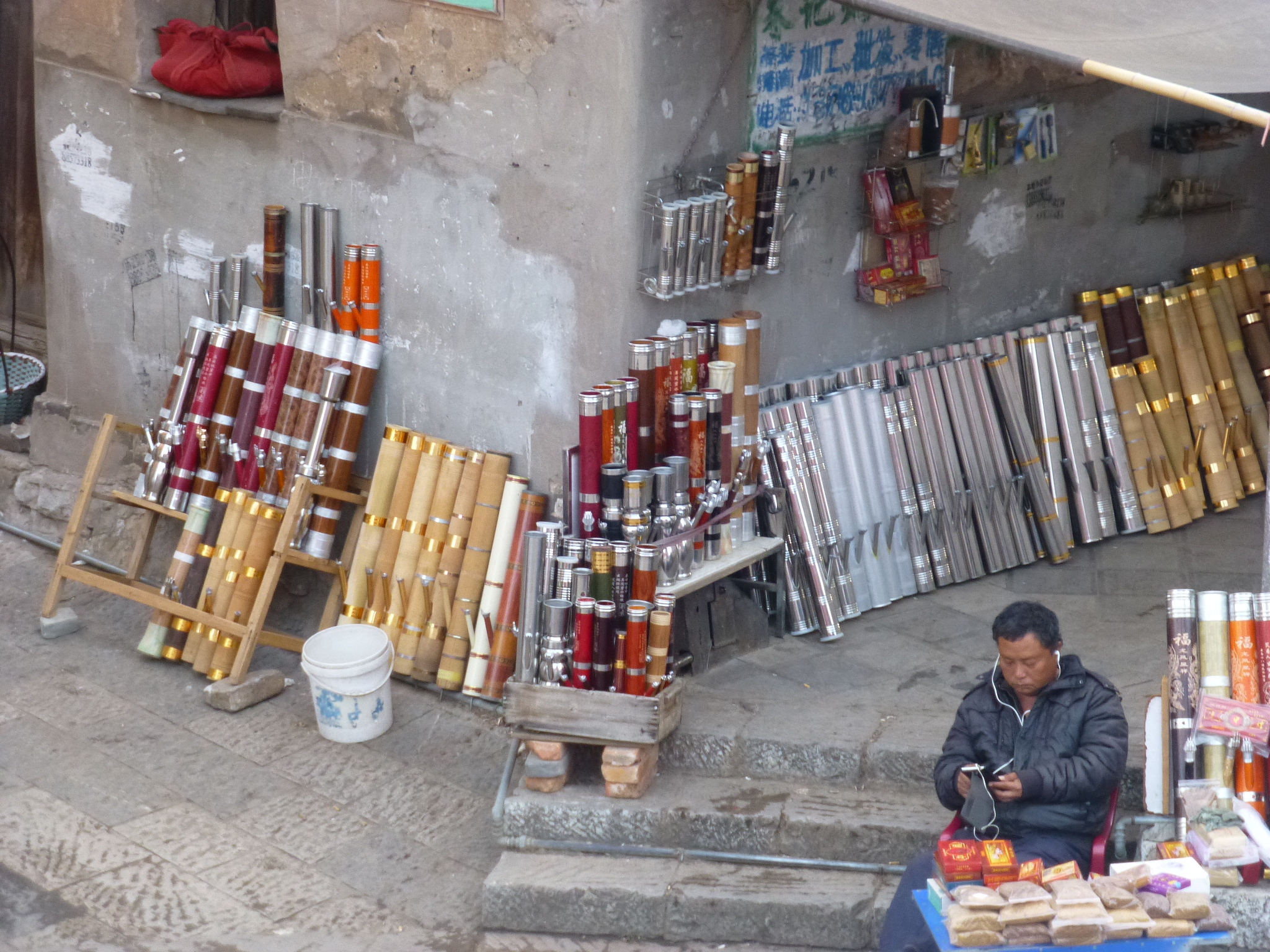
Traditional smoking pipes for sale in Lin'an, Jianshui County, China, 2016

Matches, or separately lit slivers of wood are often considered preferable to lighters because of lower burning temperature. Butane lighters made specifically for pipes emit flame sideways or at an angle to make it easier to direct flame into the bowl. Torch-style lighters should never be used to light a pipe because their flames are too hot and can char the rim of the pipe bowl. Matches should be allowed to burn for several seconds to allow the sulfur from the tip to burn away and the match to produce a full flame. A naphtha fueled lighter should also be allowed to burn a few seconds to get rid of stray naphtha vapors that could give a foul taste to the smoke. When a flame has been produced, it is then moved in circles above the rim of the bowl while the smoker puffs to draw the flame down and light the tobacco. Packing method and humidity can affect how often a pipe must be relit.

=== Burning prevention ===
With care, a briar pipe can last a very long time without burning out. However, due to aggressive (hot) smoking or imperfections in the wood, a hole can be burned in the tobacco chamber of the pipe. There are several methods used to help prevent a wood pipe from burning out. These generally involve coating the chamber with any of a variety of substances, or by gently smoking a new pipe to build up a cake (a mixture of ash, unburned tobacco, oils, sugars, and other residue) on the walls.

These coatings may include honey and water; powdered sugar and water; cigar ash and water; and sour cream, buttermilk, and activated charcoal among many others.

Many modern briar pipes are pre-treated by the manufacturer to resist burning. If smoked correctly, the cake will build up properly on its own. Another technique is to alternate a half-bowl and a full-bowl the first several times the pipe is used to build an even cake. Burley is often recommended to help a new pipe build cake.

The caked layer that helps prevent burning through the bottom or sides of a briar wood pipe may damage other pipes, such as meerschaum or clay. As the cake layer heats up, it expands and may cause cracks or breaks in non-briar pipes.

=== Smoking ===
Pipe smoke, like cigar smoke, is usually not inhaled. It is merely brought into the mouth, pumped around oral and nasal cavities to permit absorption of nicotine toward the brain through the mucous membranes, and released. It is normal to have to relight a pipe periodically. If it is smoked too slowly, this will happen more often. If it is smoked too quickly, it can produce excess moisture, causing a gurgling sound in the pipe and an uncomfortable sensation on the tongue (referred to as "pipe tongue", or more commonly, "tongue bite").

A pipe cleaner can be used to dry out the bowl and, wetted with alcohol, the inner channel. The bowl of the pipe can also become uncomfortably hot, depending on the material and the rate of smoking. For this reason, clay pipes in particular are often held by the stem. Meerschaum pipes are held in a square of chamois leather, with gloves, or else by the stem in order to prevent uneven coloring of the material.

Smoking techniques
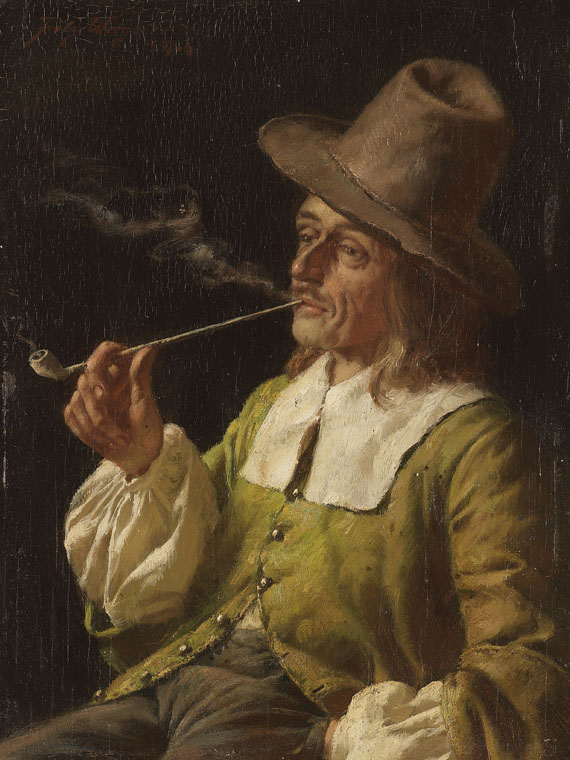
Man smoking by Fritz Wagner

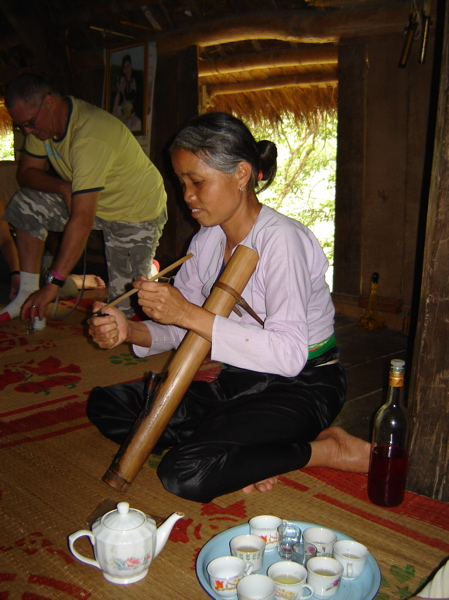
A pipe-smoking woman

=== Cleaning ===
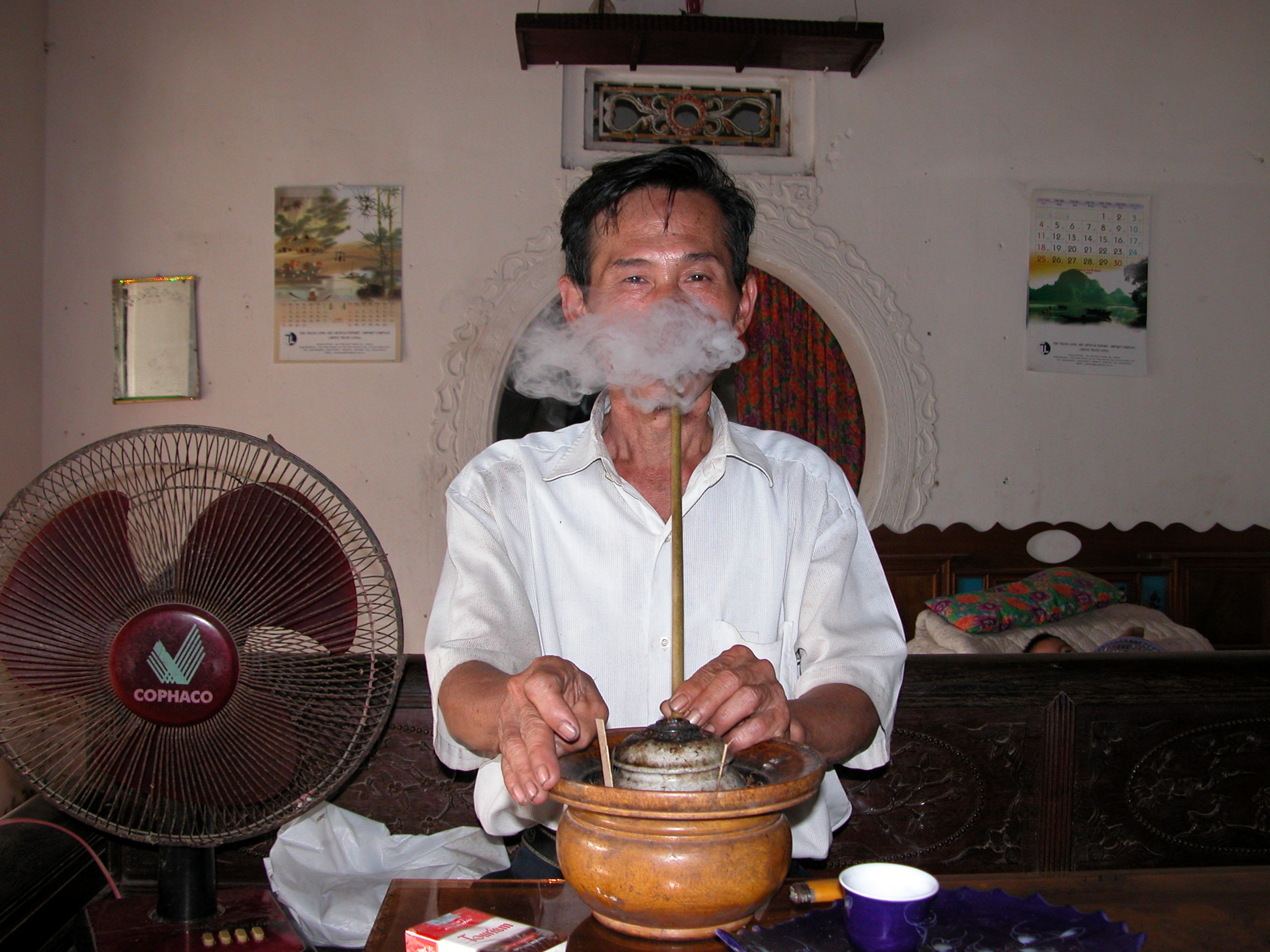
Waterpipe smoking in Vietnam

The ash and the last bits of unburned tobacco, known as dottle, should be cleaned out with a suitable pipe tool. A soft or bristle pipe cleaner, which may be moistened with strong spirits, is then run through the airways of the stem and shank to remove any moisture, ash, and other residue before the pipe is allowed to dry. A pipe should be allowed to cool before removing the stem to avoid the possibility of warping it.

A cake of ash eventually develops inside the bowl. This is generally considered desirable for controlling overall heat. However, if it becomes too thick, it may expand faster than the bowl of the pipe itself when heated, cracking the bowl. Before reaching this point, it needs to be scraped down with a reamer. It is generally recommended to keep the cake at approximately the thickness of a U.S. dime (about 1/20 of an inch or 1.5 mm), though sometimes the cake is removed entirely as part of efforts to eliminate flavors or aromas.

Cake is considered undesirable in meerschaum pipes because it can easily crack the bowl or interfere with the mineral's natural porosity. Meerschaum also softens when heated so it is recommended to allow meerschaum pipes to cool before cleaning as people have been known to push pipe cleaners through the walls of heated pipes.

Regardless whether a pipe is cleaned after every smoke, over time there is a buildup of cake in the bowl and tars in the internals of a smoking pipe. The cake can be controlled by gentle reaming, but a buildup of tars in the shank and airway of a pipe is more difficult to deal with. This may require the services of a professional pipe restorer to properly clean and sanitize the pipe.

=== Sweetening ===
When tobacco is burned, oils from adjoining not yet ignited particles vaporize and condense into the existing cake on the walls of the bowl and shank. Over time, these oils can oxidize and turn rancid, causing the pipe to give a sour or bitter smoke. A purported countermeasure involves filling the bowl with kosher salt and carefully wetting it with strong spirits. It is important to not use iodized salt, as the iodine and other additives may impart an unpleasant flavor. Regularly wiping out the bowl with spirits such as vodka or rum is helpful in preventing souring. Commercial pipe-sweetening products are also available.

== See also ==
- Bubble pipe
- Ceremonial pipe
- Churchwarden pipe
- Drug pipe
- International Pipe Smoking Day
- Kiseru
- List of notable pipe smokers
- Pipe Smoker of the Year
- Pipe tool
