= National Register of Historic Places listings in Franklin County, Missouri =

Location of Franklin County in Missouri

This is a list of the National Register of Historic Places listings in Franklin County, Missouri.

This is intended to be a complete list of the properties and districts on the National Register of Historic Places in Franklin County, Missouri, United States. Latitude and longitude coordinates are provided for many National Register properties and districts; these locations may be seen together in a map.

There are 61 properties and districts listed on the National Register in the county. Another property was once listed but has been removed.

This National Park Service list is complete through NPS recent listings posted September 26, 2025.

== Current listings ==
	Name on the Register	Image	Date listed	Location	City or town	Description
1	John Abkemeyer House	John Abkemeyer House	September 28, 2000 (#00001088)	607 Jefferson; 38°33′17″N 91°00′48″W	Washington	
2	AME Church of New Haven	AME Church of New Haven	August 18, 1992 (#92001002)	225 Selma St. 38°36′48″N 91°12′52″W	New Haven	
3	Henry Bartelmann House	Henry Bartelmann House	September 14, 2000 (#00001089)	110 W. 6th St. 38°33′21″N 91°00′54″W	Washington	
4	Bartsch-Jasper House	Bartsch-Jasper House	September 22, 2000 (#00001149)	138 Old Pottery Rd. 38°32′49″N 91°02′00″W	Washington	
5	Henry F. Beinke House	Henry F. Beinke House	September 14, 2000 (#00001090)	610 Jefferson St. 38°33′19″N 91°00′50″W	Washington	
6	Henry Beins House	Henry Beins House	September 14, 2000 (#00001091)	620 Locust St. 38°33′13″N 91°00′39″W	Washington	
7	Bethel Church	Bethel Church	February 3, 1993 (#92001867)	MO T 2 miles W of Labadie; 38°31′07″N 90°52′44″W	Labadie	
8	Brehe Farmstead Historic District	Brehe Farmstead Historic District	September 14, 2000 (#00001092)	6180 Bluff Rd. 38°33′45″N 91°03′08″W	Washington	
9	H. P. Broeker House		September 22, 2000 (#00001147)	523 Hooker St. 38°33′17″N 91°00′39″W	Washington	
10	John H. Broeker House	John H. Broeker House	September 14, 2000 (#00001093)	605 Locust St. 38°33′15″N 91°00′40″W	Washington	
11	Henry J. Buhr House	Henry J. Buhr House	September 14, 2000 (#00001087)	309 Lafayette St. 38°33′30″N 91°00′47″W	Washington	
12	John B. Busch Brewery Historic District	John B. Busch Brewery Historic District	September 14, 2000 (#00001094)	108-130A Busch Ave. and 813 Jefferson St. 38°33′11″N 91°00′55″W	Washington	
13	Caldwell Farm		October 20, 1980 (#80002351)	S of Washington on Bieker Rd. 38°30′32″N 90°59′01″W	Washington	
14	Henry Degen House	Henry Degen House	September 14, 2000 (#00001095)	112 W. 4th St. 38°33′28″N 91°00′49″W	Washington	
15	Downtown Washington Historic District	Downtown Washington Historic District	October 5, 1989 (#89001465)	Roughly W. Front St. from Stafford St. to Market St. and Elm St. from W. Front St. to Fourth St. 38°33′34″N 91°00′47″W	Washington	
16	Henry Charles Eitzen Building	Henry Charles Eitzen Building	September 14, 2000 (#00001096)	200 Jefferson St. 38°33′29″N 91°00′38″W	Washington	
17	Henry and Elizabeth Ernst House	Henry and Elizabeth Ernst House	September 14, 2000 (#00001097)	901 Stafford St. 38°33′02″N 91°01′10″W	Washington	
18	Fore Shoe Company Building	Fore Shoe Company Building	December 23, 2005 (#05001432)	601 E 6th St. 38°33′15″N 91°00′17″W	Washington	
19	Gustav Grauer Farm		September 6, 1984 (#84002142)	N of Pacific; 38°33′56″N 90°44′22″W	Pacific	
20	Charles H. Helm House	Charles H. Helm House	September 28, 2000 (#00001099)	520 E. 5th St. 38°33′12″N 91°00′27″W	Washington	
21	John and Wilhelmina Helm House		September 14, 2000 (#00001100)	536 E. 5th St. 38°33′11″N 91°00′24″W	Washington	
22	International Shoe Company Building	International Shoe Company Building	April 7, 1994 (#94000287)	160 N. Main St. 38°20′55″N 90°58′49″W	St. Clair	
23	Stephen M. Jones Building	Stephen M. Jones Building	September 14, 2000 (#00001101)	108-110 Jefferson St. 38°33′32″N 91°00′37″W	Washington	
24	Christian and Anna Keller Farmstead		August 6, 2009 (#08000867)	936 Kohl Country Ln. 38°25′46″N 91°19′15″W	Gerald	
25	Louis Kohmueller House	Louis Kohmueller House	September 14, 2000 (#00001102)	1380 S. Lake Shore Dr. 38°33′37″N 91°01′57″W	Washington	
26	Albert Krog House	Albert Krog House	September 14, 2000 (#00001103)	1395 W. Main St. 38°34′10″N 91°01′47″W	Washington	
27	Casper Kruse House	Casper Kruse House	September 14, 2000 (#00001104)	202 Stafford St. 38°33′44″N 91°01′08″W	Washington	
28	Locust Street Historic District	Locust Street Historic District	September 14, 2000 (#00001105)	Roughly bounded by E. Front, E. 5th, Jefferson, and Hooker Sts. 38°33′25″N 91°00′32″W	Washington	
29	Dr. H. A. May House	Dr. H. A. May House	September 14, 2000 (#00001106)	402 Jefferson St. 38°33′24″N 91°00′44″W	Washington	
30	Frank Mense House	Frank Mense House	September 14, 2000 (#00001107)	304 High St. 38°33′37″N 91°01′29″W	Washington	
31	Meramec State Park Beach Area Historic District	Meramec State Park Beach Area Historic District	December 6, 1991 (#91001772)	MO 185 at the Meramec R. 38°12′24″N 91°05′43″W	Sullivan	
32	Meramec State Park Lookout House/Observation Tower	Meramec State Park Lookout House/Observation Tower	February 28, 1985 (#85000530)	E of Sullivan off MO 185; 38°12′45″N 91°05′27″W	Sullivan	
33	Meramec State Park Pump House	Meramec State Park Pump House	February 28, 1985 (#85000531)	E of Sullivan off MO 185; 38°12′58″N 91°05′31″W	Sullivan	
34	Meramec State Park Shelter House	Meramec State Park Shelter House	February 26, 1985 (#85000532)	E of Sullivan off MO 185; 38°12′51″N 91°05′21″W	Sullivan	
35	John Meyer House	John Meyer House	September 14, 2000 (#00001108)	800 E. 6th St. 38°33′06″N 91°00′13″W	Washington	
36	Paul Monje House	Paul Monje House	September 14, 2000 (#00001109)	1003 W. 5th St. 38°33′24″N 91°01′31″W	Washington	
37	Moselle Iron Furnace Stack		May 21, 1969 (#69000100)	1 mile SE of Moselle; 38°22′48″N 90°52′51″W	Moselle	
38	New Haven Commercial Historic District	New Haven Commercial Historic District	May 5, 1999 (#99000531)	111-139 Front St. 38°36′50″N 91°12′52″W	New Haven	
39	New Haven Residential Historic District	New Haven Residential Historic District	June 3, 1999 (#99000661)	Roughly along Wall St. and Maupin Ave., and bounded by Washington and Bates Sts. 38°36′47″N 91°12′57″W	New Haven	
40	James North House		April 5, 1984 (#84002534)	MO T 38°26′16″N 90°51′24″W	Labadie	
41	Mark O'Hara House	Mark O'Hara House	September 14, 2000 (#00001110)	1 South Point Pl. 38°32′37″N 90°58′35″W	Washington	
42	Old Gerald School	Old Gerald School	June 27, 2014 (#14000375)	111 W. 3rd St. 38°24′07″N 91°19′57″W	Gerald	
43	Panhorst Feed Store	Panhorst Feed Store	July 5, 1990 (#90001023)	465 St. Clair St. 38°20′49″N 90°58′56″W	St. Clair	
44	Wilhelm Pelster House-Barn	Wilhelm Pelster House-Barn	December 5, 1978 (#78001645)	S of New Haven; 38°29′36″N 91°16′20″W	New Haven	
45	Louis H. Peters House	Louis H. Peters House	September 14, 2000 (#00001111)	408 E. 6th St. 38°33′12″N 91°00′35″W	Washington	
46	Joseph Raaf House	Joseph Raaf House	September 14, 2000 (#00001112)	602 Jefferson St. 38°33′37″N 91°01′29″W	Washington	
47	St. Albans Farms Stone Barn	St. Albans Farms Stone Barn	January 26, 2006 (#05001550)	3476 St. Albans Rd. 38°35′00″N 90°45′27″W	St. Albans	
48	St. Albans General Store	St. Albans General Store	April 11, 2003 (#03000204)	3516 St. Albans Rd. 38°34′48″N 90°46′19″W	St. Albans	
49	Fred Schnier Building	Fred Schnier Building	September 14, 2000 (#00001113)	10-12 W. 2nd St. 38°33′31″N 91°00′41″W	Washington	
50	Franz Schwarzer House	Franz Schwarzer House	July 17, 1978 (#78001646)	2 Walnut St. 38°33′31″N 91°00′28″W	Washington	
51	John F. Schwegmann House	John F. Schwegmann House	March 22, 1984 (#84002538)	438 W. Front St. 38°33′45″N 91°00′54″W	Washington	
52	Spaunhorst and Mayn Building	Spaunhorst and Mayn Building	February 16, 2007 (#07000041)	300-305 Jefferson St. 38°33′31″N 91°00′40″W	Washington	
53	Stafford-Olive Historic District	Stafford-Olive Historic District	September 14, 2000 (#00001114)	Roughly bounded by Stafford, Olive, W. 5th, and W. 2nd Sts. 38°33′36″N 91°01′05″W	Washington	
54	George Tamm Building	George Tamm Building	September 14, 2000 (#00001115)	121 Jefferson St. 38°33′32″N 91°00′39″W	Washington	
55	Tavern Cave		June 15, 1970 (#70000331)	Address Restricted	St. Albans	
56	Henry C. Thias House	Henry C. Thias House	September 20, 1984 (#84002539)	304 Elm St. 38°33′32″N 91°00′51″W	Washington	
57	Tibbe Historic District	Tibbe Historic District	March 22, 1990 (#90000501)	Bounded by Front, Market, Main, Lafayette, Second, Oak, Fifth, Cedar, Main, and Olive; 38°33′32″N 91°00′57″W	Washington	
58	Jonathan L. Tuepker House	Jonathan L. Tuepker House	September 14, 2000 (#00001116)	519 Stafford St. 38°33′24″N 91°01′11″W	Washington	
59	Christopher and Johanna Twelker Farm		November 2, 2016 (#16000748)	4749 MO 185; 38°29′59″N 91°10′34″W	New Haven vicinity	
60	William T. Vitt House	William T. Vitt House	September 14, 2000 (#00001117)	2 River Pilot Dr. 38°33′11″N 90°59′49″W	Washington	
61	Louis Wehrmann Building	Louis Wehrmann Building	September 14, 2000 (#00001118)	212 Jefferson St. 38°33′28″N 91°00′40″W	Washington	

== Former listing ==
	Name on the Register	Image	Date listed	Date removed	Location	City or town	Description
1	John Glaser Pottery Factory		September 14, 2000 (#00001098)	August 26, 2005	812 W. Front St.	Washington	Demolished in 2003.

== See also ==
- List of National Historic Landmarks in Missouri
- National Register of Historic Places listings in Missouri
