= North House =

North House, or variations such as North Cottage, may refer to:

in England

- North Cottage, Shoreham-by-Sea, England, a Grade II listed building in the District of Adur

in the United States

- Pforzheimer House (Harvard College), formerly named North House, a residential house at Harvard University, Cambridge, Massachusetts
- Townsend North House, Vassar, Michigan, listed on the National Register of Historic Places (NRHP) in Tuscola County
- James North House, Labadie, Missouri, listed on the NRHP in Franklin County
- North Mansion and Tenant House (also known as Gen. William North House), Duanesburg, New York, NRHP-listed
- Benjamin D. North House, Middlefield, New York, NRHP-listed
- John A. North House, Lewisburg, West Virginia, NRHP-listed

== See also ==
- North Hall (disambiguation)
