= Peters House =

Peters House may refer to:

- Edward C. Peters House, Atlanta, GA, listed on the National Register of Historic Places (NRHP)
- Walker-Peters-Langdon House, Columbus, GA, listed on the NRHP in Georgia
- John Claus Peters House, Fort Wayne, IN, NRHP-listed
- Henry Peters House, Garrett, IN, listed on the NRHP in Indiana
- J. C. Peters House, Davenport, IA, listed on the NRHP in Iowa
- Peters House (Petersburg, Kentucky), listed on the NRHP in Kentucky
- John Peters House, Blue Hill, ME, listed on the NRHP in Maine
- Charles Peters, Sr., House, Saginaw, MI, listed on the NRHP in Michigan
- Ferdinand Peters House, Cold Spring, MN, listed on the NRHP in Minnesota
- Peters House (Florissant, Missouri), listed on the NRHP in Missouri
- Louis H. Peters House, Washington, MO, listed on the NRHP in Missouri
- Peters-Kupferschmid House, Cincinnati, OH, NRHP-listed
- Stevenson Peters House, Circleville, OH, NRHP-listed
- A. V. Peters House, Eugene, OR, NRHP-listed
- Peters House (Milford, Pennsylvania), NRHP-listed
- Peters-Graham House, Greensboro, PA, NRHP-listed
- William Peters House, Mendenhall, PA, NRHP-listed
- Peters House (Knoxville, Tennessee), NRHP-listed
- George Peters House, Black Creek, WI, NRHP-listed
