= Downtown Washington Historic District =

Historic district in Missouri, United States

- U.S. National Register of Historic Places
- U.S. Historic district
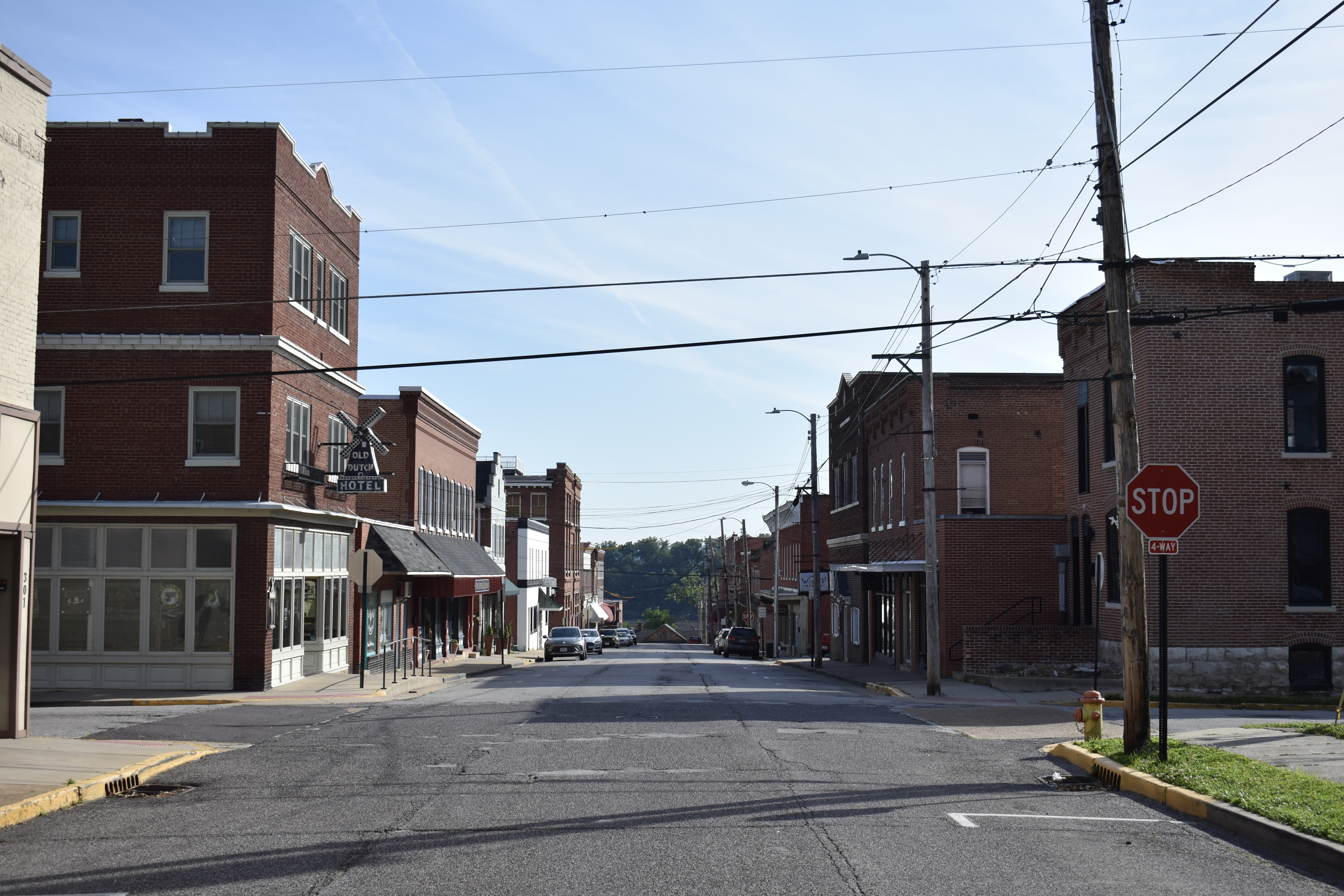
- Downtown Washington Historic District, May 2026

- Location within Missouri Location within the United States
- Location: Roughly W. Front St. from Stafford St. to Market St. and Elm St. from W. Front St. to Fourth St., Washington, Missouri
- Coordinates: 38°33′34″N 91°00′47″W
- Area: 31 acres (13 ha)
- Architectural style: Late 19th And 20th Century Revivals, Greek Revival, Late Victorian
- NRHP reference No.: 89001465
- Added to NRHP: October 5, 1989

Downtown Washington Historic District is a national historic district located at Washington, Franklin County, Missouri. The district encompasses 83 contributing buildings and 9 contributing structures in the central business district of Washington. The district developed between about 1849 and 1940 and includes representative examples of Greek Revival, Late Victorian, and American Craftsman style architecture. Located in the district is the separately listed Henry C. Thias House. Notable buildings include the St. Francis Borgia Catholic Church complex, U.S. Post Office (1922), Waterworks Building, Calvin Theater (1909), railway depot (1923), and Masonic lodge (1929).

It was listed on the National Register of Historic Places in 1989.
