= Locust Street Historic District (Washington, Missouri) =

Historic district in Missouri, United States

- U.S. National Register of Historic Places
- U.S. Historic district
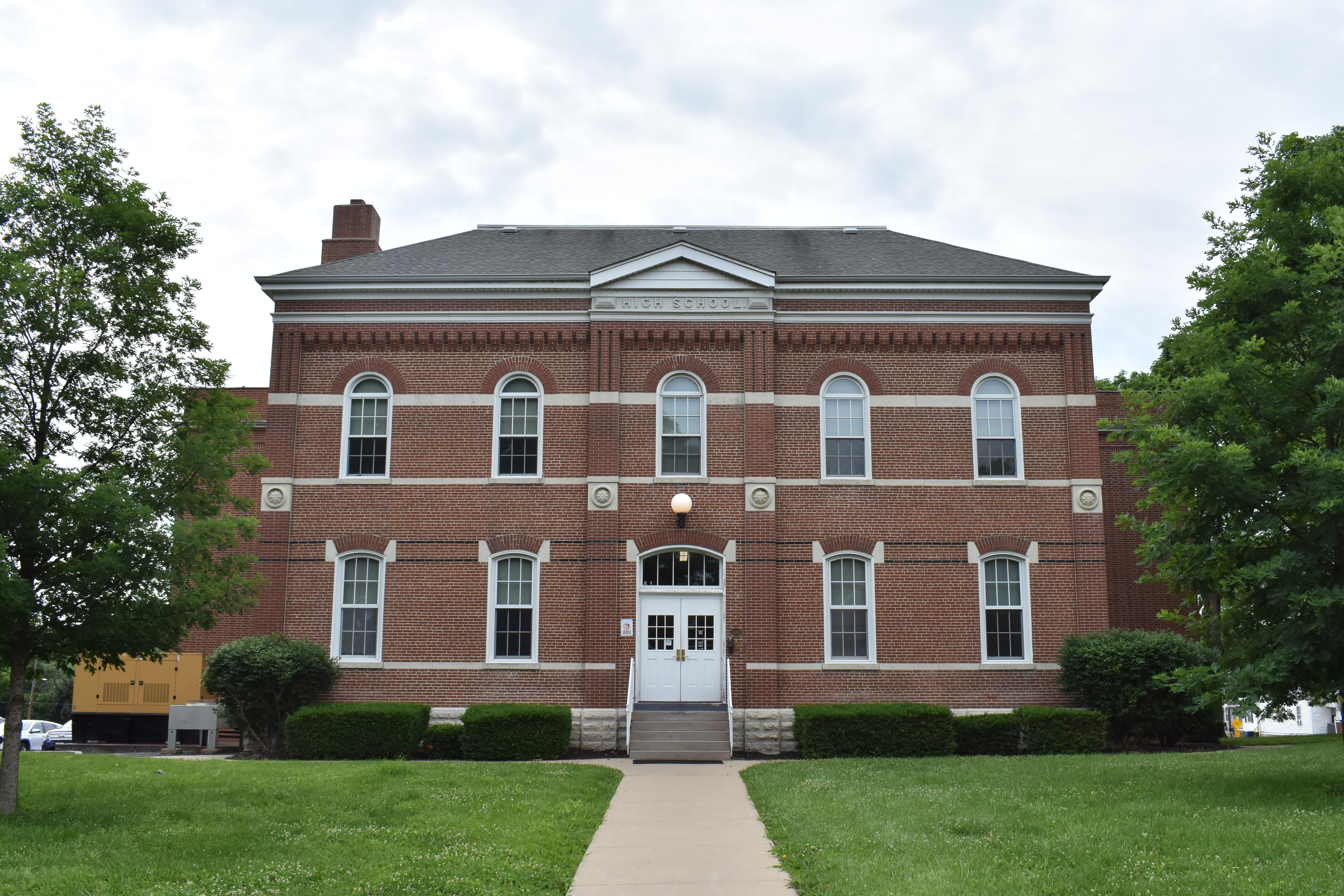
- Locust Street Historic District, May 2026

- Location within Missouri Location within the United States
- Location: Roughly bounded by E. Front, E. 5th, Jefferson, and Hooker Sts., Washington, Missouri
- Coordinates: 38°33′25″N 91°0′32″W
- Area: 40 acres (16 ha)
- Built: 1839
- Architect: Beinke, Herman H.; Goodrich, Francis, et al.
- Architectural style: Queen Anne, Missouri-German
- MPS: Washington, Missouri MPS
- NRHP reference No.: 00001105
- Added to NRHP: September 14, 2000

Locust Street Historic District is a national historic district located at Washington, Franklin County, Missouri. The district encompasses 123 contributing buildings in a predominantly residential section of Washington. The district developed between about 1839 and 1949, and includes representative examples of Italianate, Queen Anne, Colonial Revival, and Bungalow / American Craftsman style residential architecture. Located in the district is the separately listed Franz Schwarzer House. Other notable buildings include the Lucinda Owens House (1839), Frederich Griese House (c. 1865), Sophia Greiwe House (c 1865), Presbyterian Church (1916), Hy. Oberhaus House (c. 1928), Gustav Richert Apartment Building (c. 1930), Southern Presbyterian Church/Attucks School (1868), Washington High School (1887), and AME Church (c. 1890)

It was listed on the National Register of Historic Places in 2000.
