= Louis Wehrmann Building =

- U.S. National Register of Historic Places
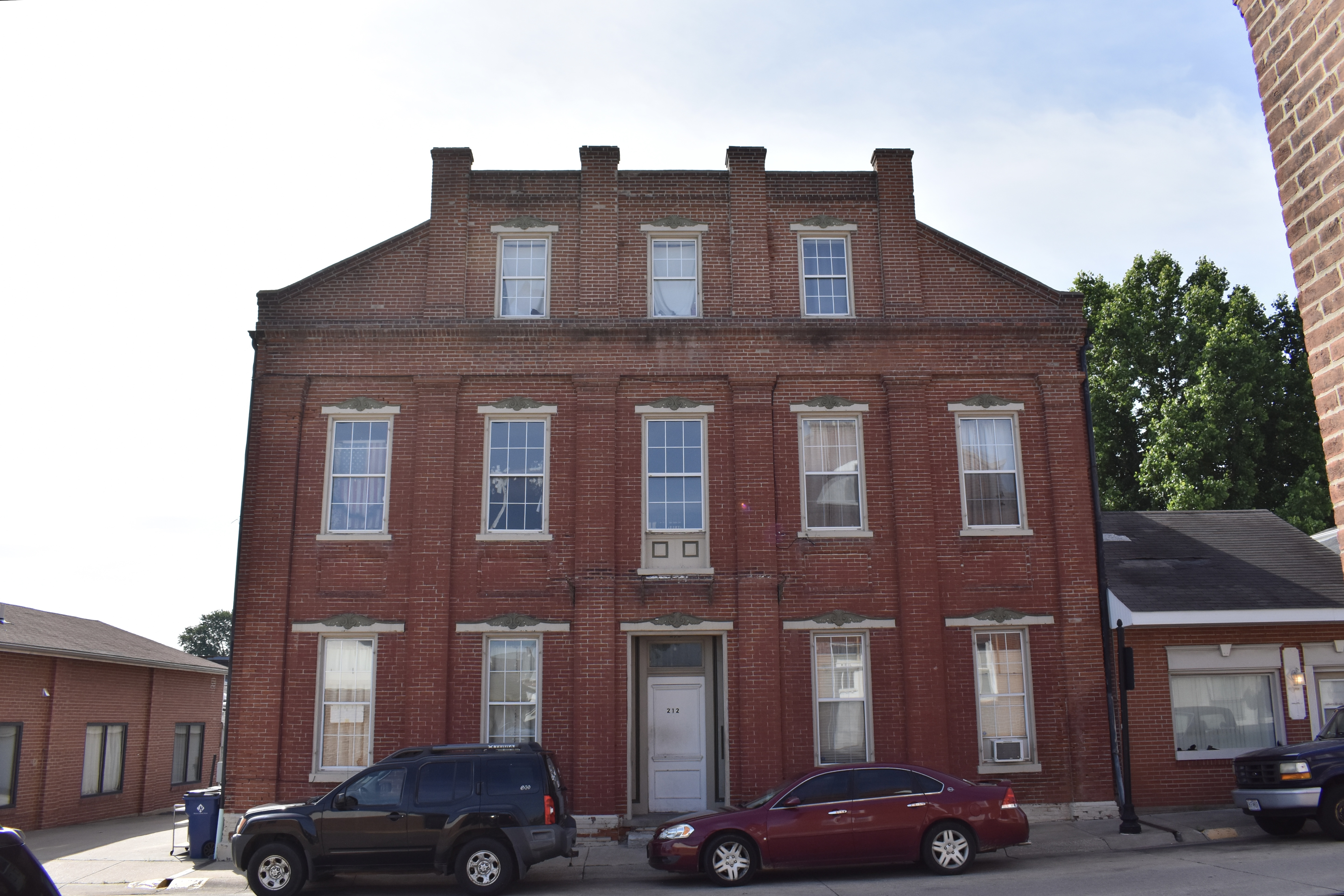
- Wehrmann Building, May 2026

- Location within Missouri Location within the United States
- Location: 212 Jefferson St., Washington, Missouri
- Coordinates: 38°33′28″N 91°0′40″W
- Area: less than one acre
- Built: 1857
- Architectural style: Klassisismus
- MPS: Washington, Missouri MPS
- NRHP reference No.: 00001118
- Added to NRHP: September 14, 2000

Louis Wehrmann Building, also known as the John and Amy Mintrup House, is a historic commercial building located at Washington, Franklin County, Missouri. It was built about 1857, and is a 2 1/2-story, five-bay, German Neoclassical style brick building in the Klassisismus form. It features a two-story neoclassical pilasters and an ornamental ironwork balcony over the central front door.

It was listed on the National Register of Historic Places in 2000.
