= Louis Kohmueller House =

Historic house in Missouri, United States

- U.S. National Register of Historic Places
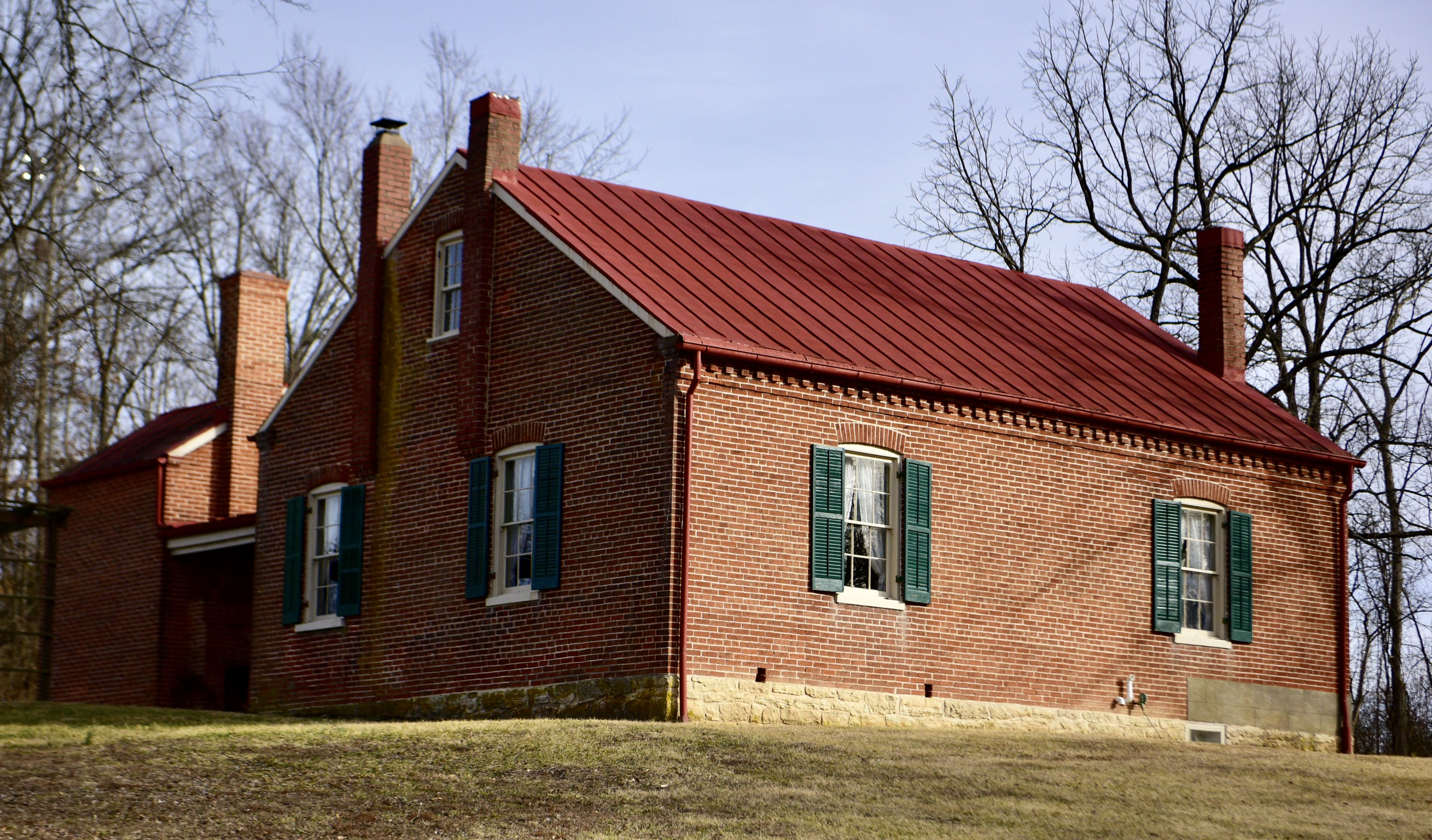

- Location within Missouri Location within the United States
- Location: 1380 S. Lakeshore Dr. Washington, Missouri
- Coordinates: 38°33′37″N 91°1′57″W
- Area: less than one acre
- Built: c. 1878
- Built by: Mittendorf and Theerman
- Architectural style: Missouri-German
- MPS: Washington, Missouri MPS
- NRHP reference No.: 00001102
- Added to NRHP: September 14, 2000

Louis Kohmueller House, also known as the Fred Kohmueller House, is a historic home located at Washington, Franklin County, Missouri. It was built about 1878, and is a one-story, brick dwelling on a stone foundation. It has a side-gable roof and segmental arched door and window openings. Attached to the house by a low-pitched shed roof is a 1 1/2-story smoke house. Also on the property is the contributing large frame barn (c. 1908).

It was listed on the National Register of Historic Places in 2000.
