= Fore Shoe Company Building =

- U.S. National Register of Historic Places
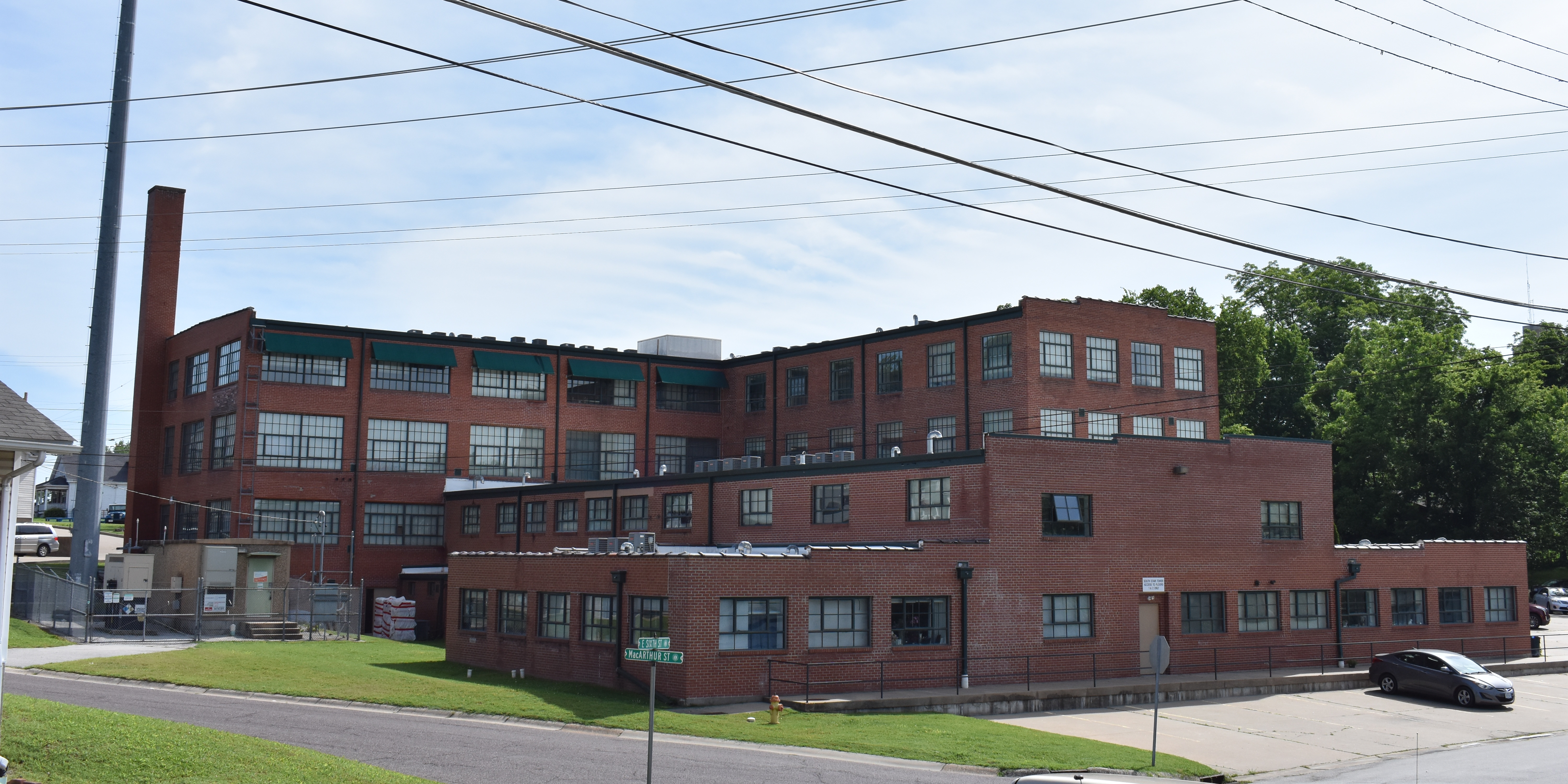
- Fore Shoe Company Building, May 2026

- Location within Missouri Location within the United States
- Location: 601 E 6th St., Washington, Missouri
- Coordinates: 38°33′15″N 91°0′17″W
- Area: less than one acre
- Built: 1925, 1927
- Built by: Lohmeyer and Schulte
- Architectural style: Brick Factory
- NRHP reference No.: 05001432
- Added to NRHP: December 23, 2005

Fore Shoe Company Building, also known as the Washington Shoe Company Building and Kane Dunham & Kraus Shoe Company Building, is a historic shoe factory building located at Washington, Franklin County, Missouri. The original section was built in 1925, and is a two-story, reinforced concrete and wood beam structure sheathed in brick. A two- and three-story brick addition was built in 1927, and is of steel frame construction. The building features a prominent brick smoke stack and measures approximately 58,000 square feet of floor space. The factory closed in 1971.

It was listed on the National Register of Historic Places in 2005.
