= John H. Broeker House =

Historic house in Missouri, United States

- U.S. National Register of Historic Places
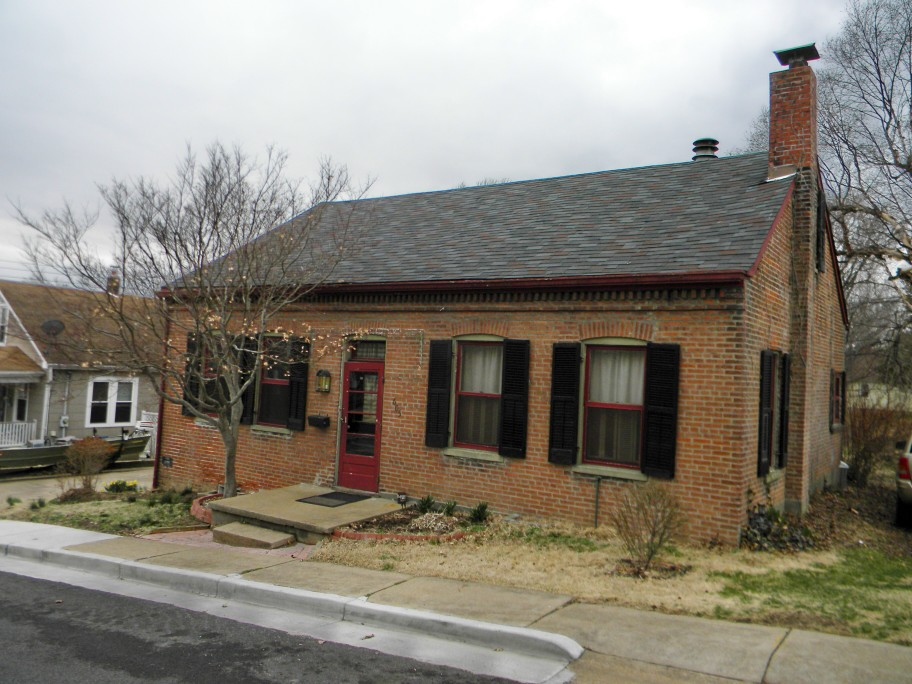
- Broeker House, March 2014

- Location within Missouri Location within the United States
- Location: 605 Locust St., Washington, Missouri
- Coordinates: 38°33′15″N 91°0′40″W
- Area: less than one acre
- Built: c. 1868
- Architectural style: Missouri-German
- MPS: Washington, Missouri MPS
- NRHP reference No.: 00001093
- Added to NRHP: September 14, 2000

John H. Broeker House is a historic home located at Washington, Franklin County, Missouri. It was built about 1868, and is a 1 1/2-story, five-bay, central passage plan brick dwelling on a brick foundation. It has a side-gable roof and low segmental arched door and window openings. The formerly separate brick washhouse or summer kitchen was connected to the house about 1940.

It was listed on the National Register of Historic Places in 2000.
