= Charles H. Helm House =

Historic house in Missouri, United States

- U.S. National Register of Historic Places
- Location within Missouri Location within the United States
- Location: 520 E. 5th St., Washington, Missouri
- Coordinates: 38°33′12″N 91°0′27″W
- Area: less than one acre
- Built: 1873, c. 1900
- Architectural style: Missouri-German
- MPS: Washington, Missouri MPS
- NRHP reference No.: 00001099
- Added to NRHP: September 28, 2000

Charles H. Helm House, also known as the John and Wilhelmina Helm House, is a historic home located at Washington, Franklin County, Missouri. It was built about 1873, and is a small 1 1/2-story, two bay brick dwelling. It has a side gable roof and tall jack arch door and window openings. Also on the property is the contributing one room frame kitchen building (c. 1900)

It was listed on the National Register of Historic Places in 2000.
