= Albert Krog House =

Historic house in Missouri, United States

- U.S. National Register of Historic Places
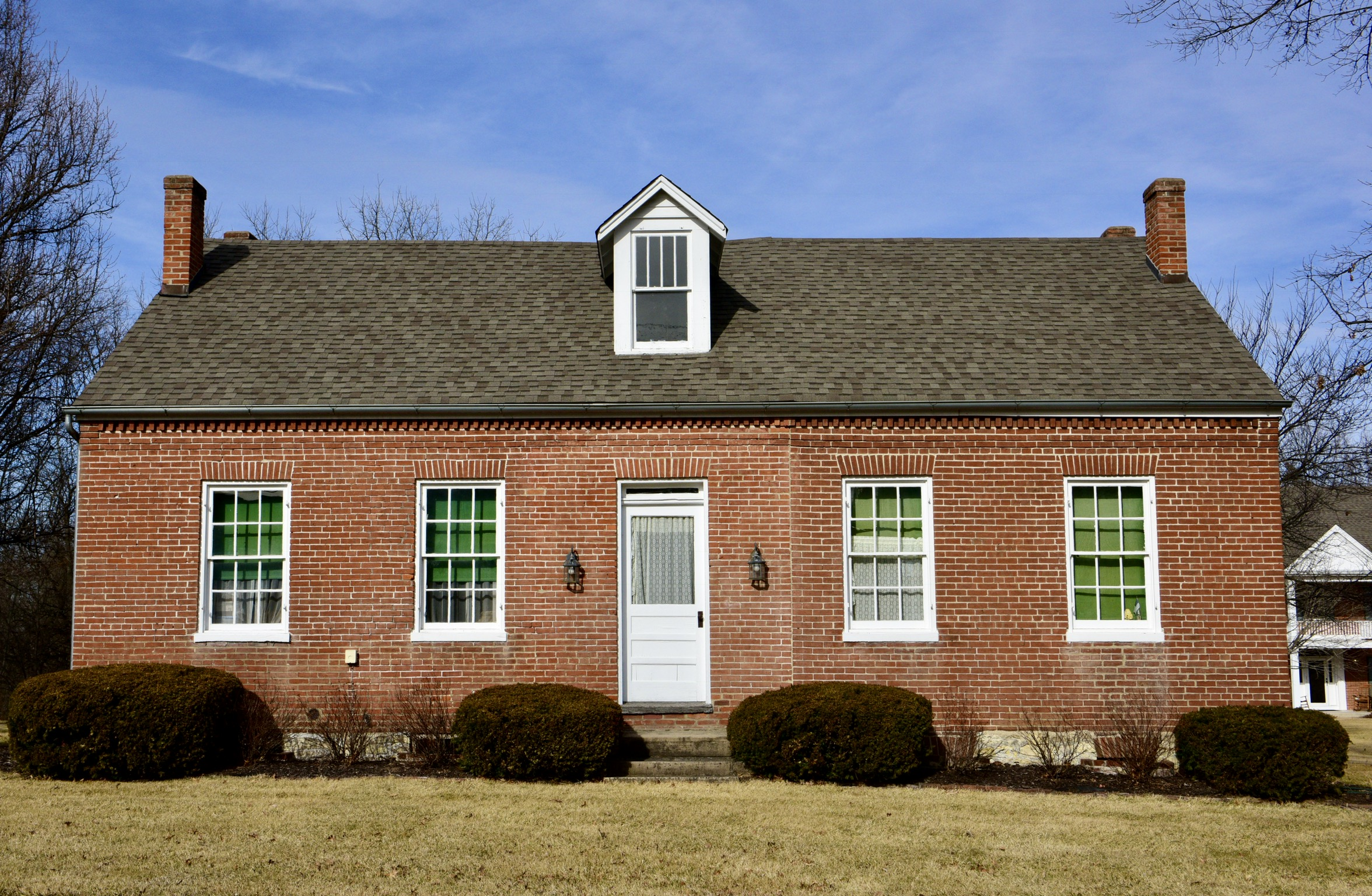

- Location within Missouri Location within the United States
- Location: 1395 W. Main St. Washington, Missouri
- Coordinates: 38°34′10″N 91°1′47″W
- Area: less than one acre
- Built: c. 1850
- Architectural style: Missouri-German
- MPS: Washington, Missouri MPS
- NRHP reference No.: 00001103
- Added to NRHP: September 14, 2000

Albert Krog House is a historic home located at Washington, Franklin County, Missouri. It was built about 1850, and is a 1 1/2-story, five-bay, central passage plan brick dwelling on a stone foundation. It has a side-gable roof and jack arched door and window openings. It originally had a three-bay, side-entry facade, which was expanded to its present form at a very early date.

It was listed on the National Register of Historic Places in 2000.
