= Bartsch-Jasper House =

Historic house in Missouri, United States

- U.S. National Register of Historic Places
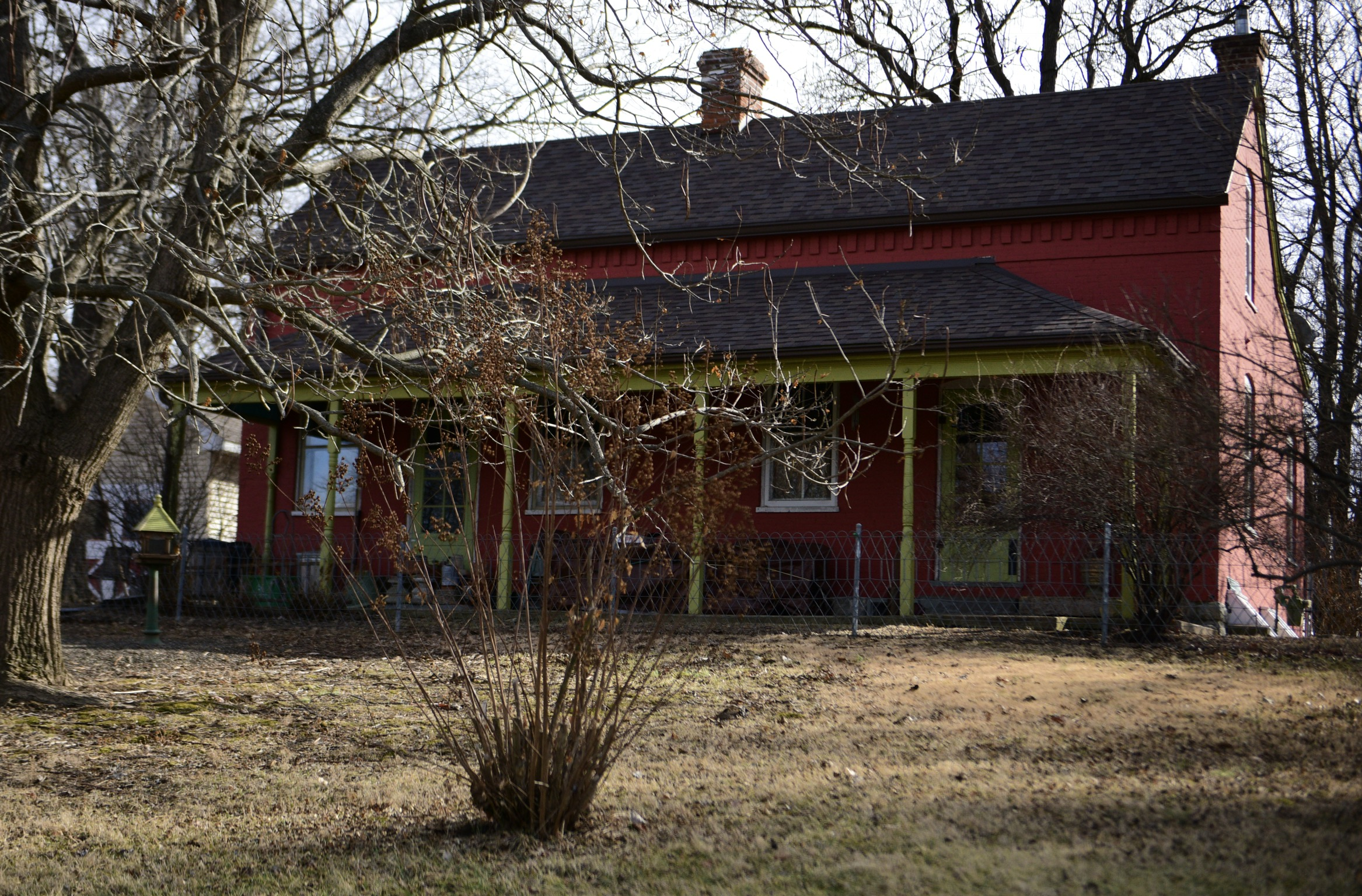

- Location within Missouri Location within the United States
- Location: 138 Old Pottery Rd. Washington, Missouri
- Coordinates: 38°32′49″N 91°2′0″W
- Area: less than one acre
- Built: c. 1855
- Architectural style: Missouri-German
- MPS: Washington, Missouri MPS
- NRHP reference No.: 00001149
- Added to NRHP: September 22, 2000

Bartsch-Jasper House, also known as the August Bartsch House, Henry Jasper House, and Charles Kampschroeder House, is a historic home located at Washington, Franklin County, Missouri.

== History ==
It was built about 1855 and expanded to its present size about 1893. It is a 1 1/2-story, double entrance, brick dwelling on a stone foundation. It has a side gable roof and open hip roofed front porch with turned support posts.

It was listed on the National Register of Historic Places in 2000.
