= Casper Kruse House =

Historic house in Missouri, United States

- U.S. National Register of Historic Places
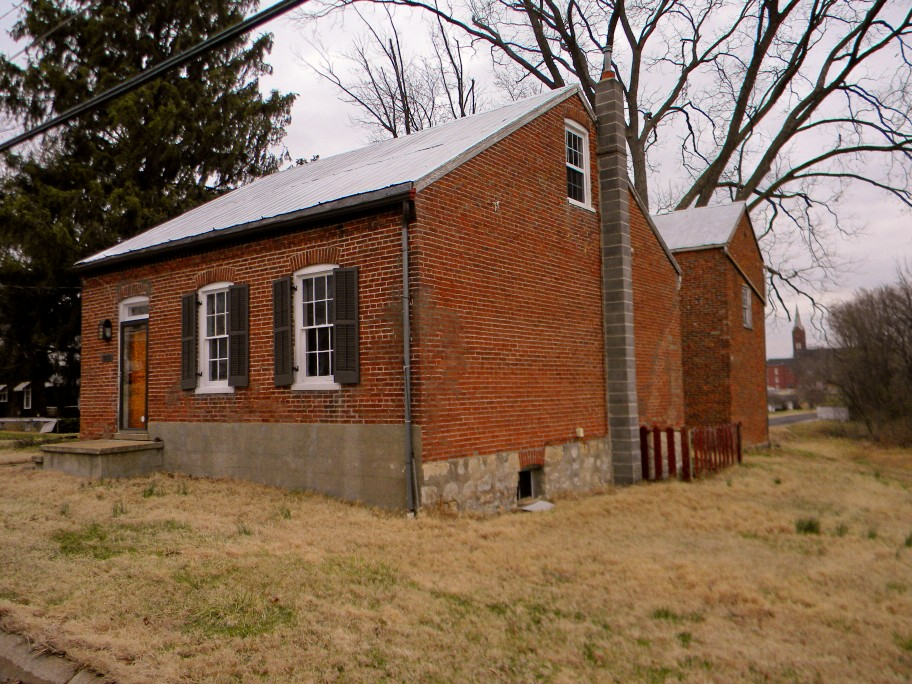
- Kruse House, March 2014

- Location within Missouri Location within the United States
- Location: 202 Stafford St., Washington, Missouri
- Coordinates: 38°33′44″N 91°1′8″W
- Area: less than one acre
- Built: c. 1868
- Architectural style: Vernacular Missouri-German
- MPS: Washington, Missouri MPS
- NRHP reference No.: 00001104
- Added to NRHP: September 14, 2000

Casper Kruse House, also known as the Wilhelmina Stumpe House, is a historic home located at Washington, Franklin County, Missouri. It was built about 1868, and is a 1 1/2-story, three-bay, side entry brick dwelling on a stone foundation. It has a side-gable roof and low segmental arched door and window openings. Also on the property is a contributing two-story brick smokehouse.

It was listed on the National Register of Historic Places in 2000.
