= North Hall =

North Hall may refer to:

- North Hall (Gainesville, Florida), historic building
- North Hall (University of Wisconsin), first building on University of Wisconsin campus
- North Hall High School, high school in Hall County, Georgia
- North Hall-River Falls State Normal School, historic building in Wisconsin
