= Brehe Farmstead Historic District =

Historic district in Missouri, United States

- U.S. National Register of Historic Places
- U.S. Historic district
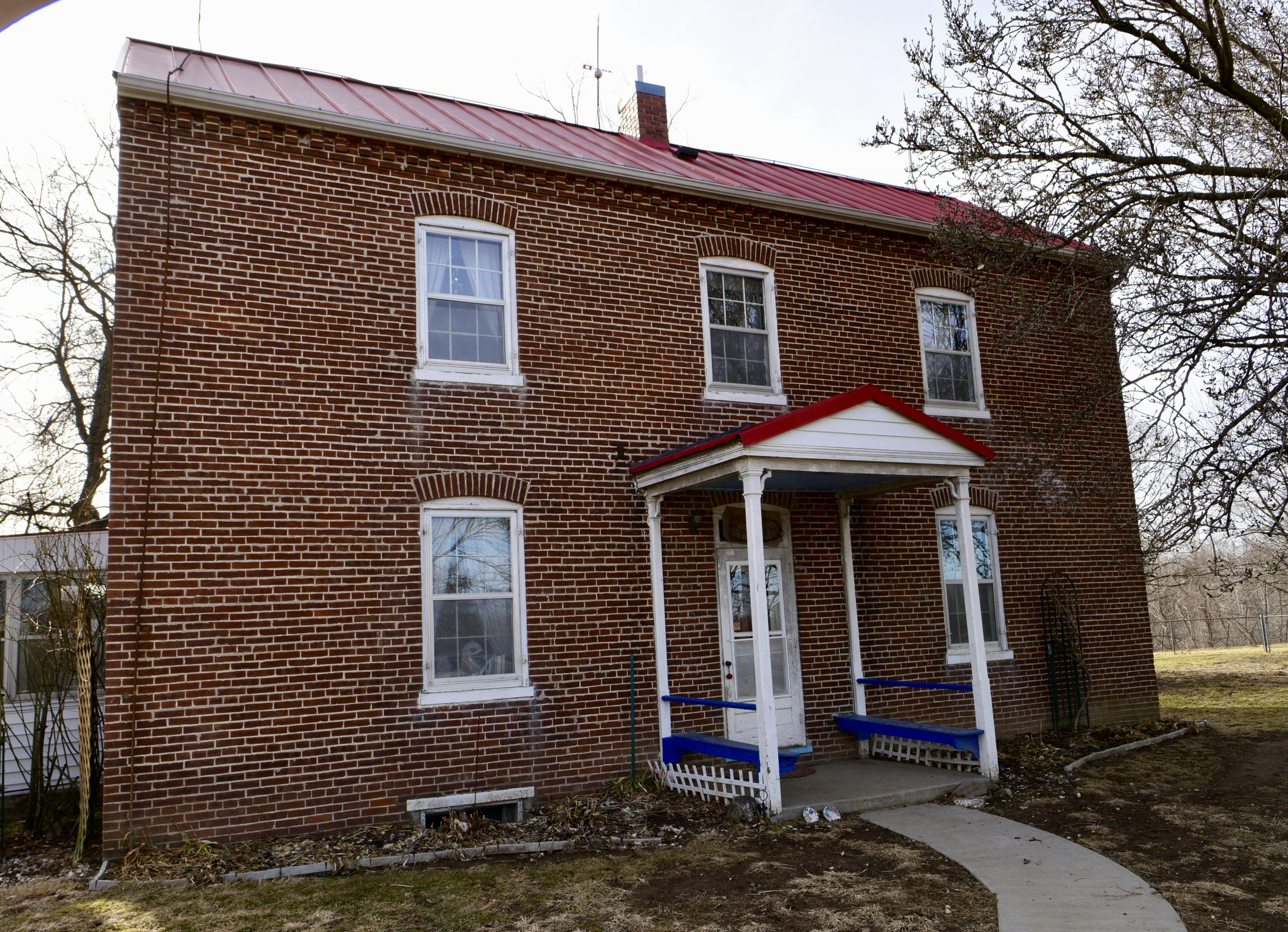

- Location within Missouri Location within the United States
- Location: 6180 Bluff Rd. Washington, Missouri
- Coordinates: 38°33′45″N 91°03′08″W
- Area: 6.9 acres (2.8 ha)
- Architectural style: Missouri-German
- MPS: Washington, Missouri MPS
- NRHP reference No.: 00001092
- Added to NRHP: September 14, 2000

Brehe Farmstead Historic District, also known as the Fairview Stock Farm, is a historic home, farm, and national historic district located at Washington, Franklin County, Missouri. The farmhouse was built about 1869, and is a two-story brick dwelling. The other contributing buildings are the brick smokehouse/ dwelling combination (c. 1865), a frame poultry house (1940s), a large frame granary (c. 1925), a Quonset barn (ca. 1945), a small frame milk house (c. 1930), and a large gambrel roofed bank barn (c. 1930) with a round ceramic block silo.

It was listed on the National Register of Historic Places in 2000.
