= Henry F. Beinke House =

Historic house in Missouri, United States

- U.S. National Register of Historic Places
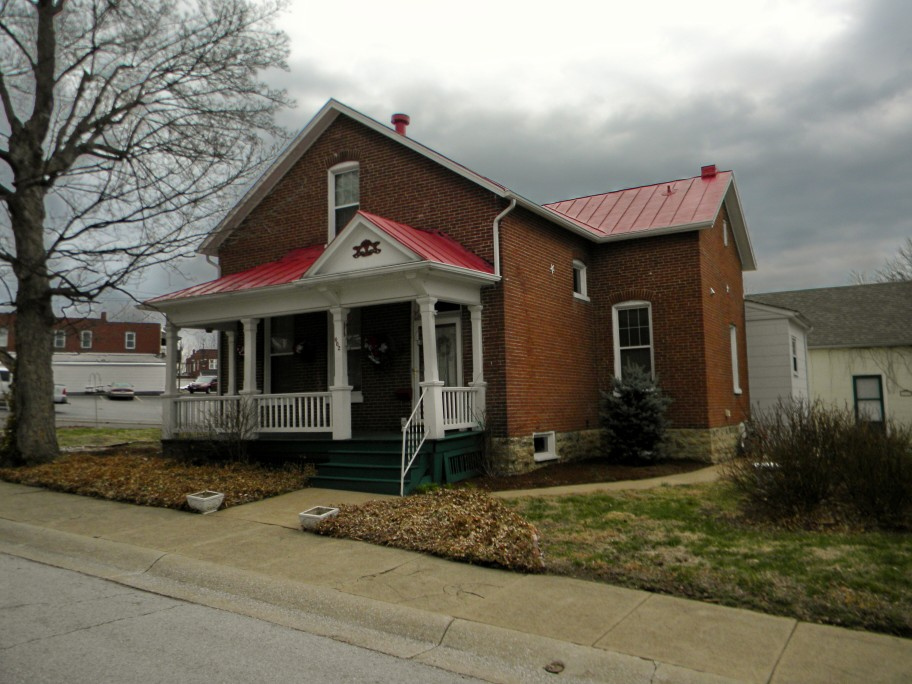
- Beinke House, March 2013

- Location within Missouri Location within the United States
- Location: 610 Jefferson Street, Washington, Missouri
- Coordinates: 38°33′19″N 91°0′50″W
- Area: less than one acre
- Built: c. 1878, c. 1900
- Built by: Beinke, Henry H.
- Architectural style: Missouri-German
- MPS: Washington, Missouri MPS
- NRHP reference No.: 00001090
- Added to NRHP: September 14, 2000

The Henry F. Beinke House (also known as the Wm. Wollbrink House) is a historic house located at 610 Jefferson Street in Washington, Franklin County, Missouri. It is locally significant as an example go the Missouri-German style of architecture.

== Description and history ==
It was built about 1878, and is a 1 1/2-story, side entry brick dwelling resting on a stone foundation. The facade is three bays wide and it has a side-facing gable roof and segmental arched door and window openings. It has a small rear addition added about 1900.

It was listed on the National Register of Historic Places on September 14, 2000.
