= Mark O'Hara House =

Historic house in Missouri, United States

- U.S. National Register of Historic Places
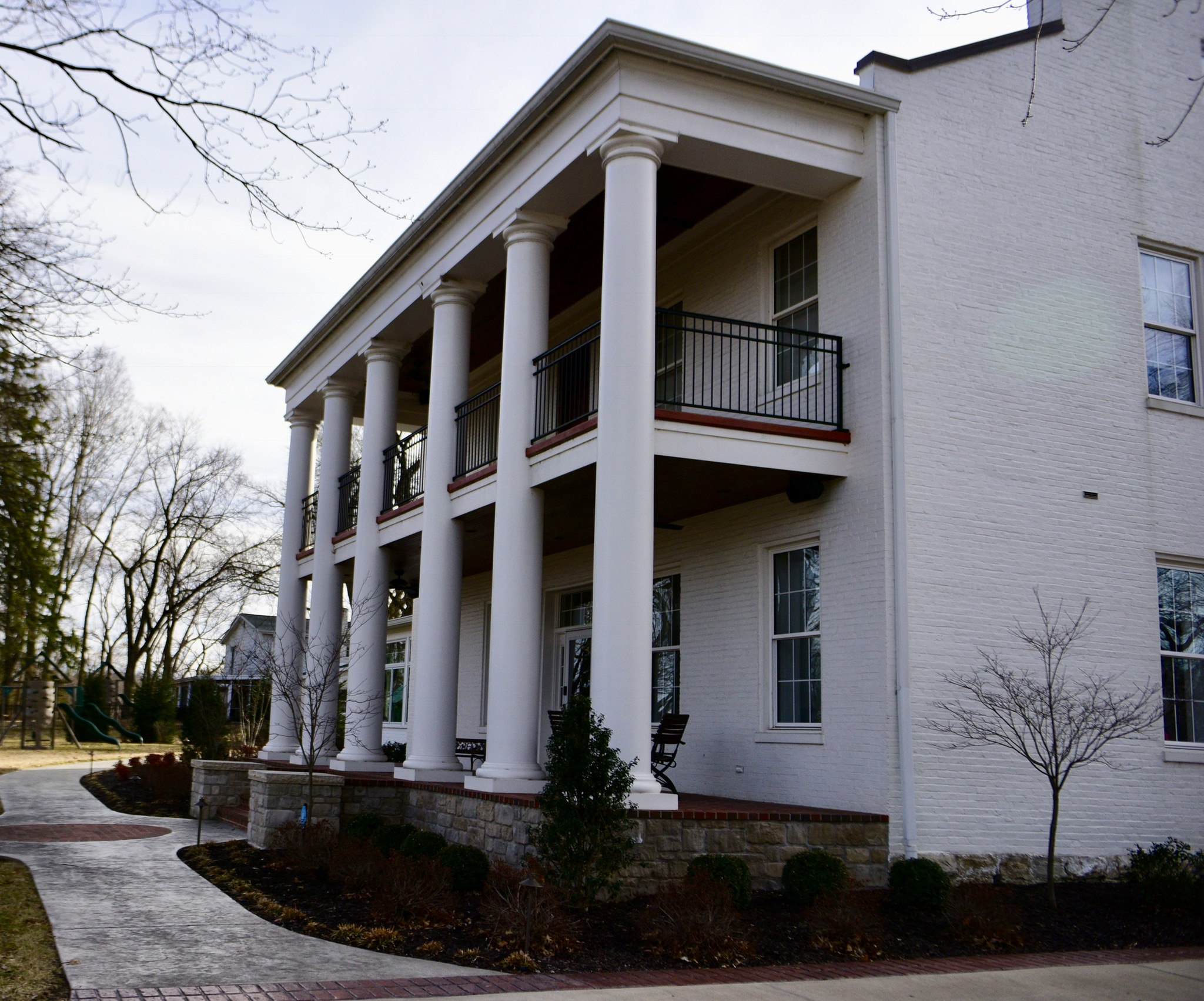

- Location within Missouri Location within the United States
- Location: 1 South Point Pl. Washington, Missouri
- Coordinates: 38°32′37″N 90°58′35″W
- Area: 6 acres (2.4 ha)
- Built: c. 1856
- Architectural style: Federal
- MPS: Washington, Missouri MPS
- NRHP reference No.: 00001110
- Added to NRHP: September 14, 2000

Mark O'Hara House, also known as the W. F. Kuenzel House, is a historic home located at Washington, Franklin County, Missouri. It was built about 1856, and is a large 2 1/2-story, five-bay, Federal style brick dwelling on a stone foundation. It has a two-story brick side ell, side-gable roof, and flat topped door and window openings.

It was listed on the National Register of Historic Places in 2000.
