= Henry Beins House =

Historic house in Missouri, United States

- U.S. National Register of Historic Places
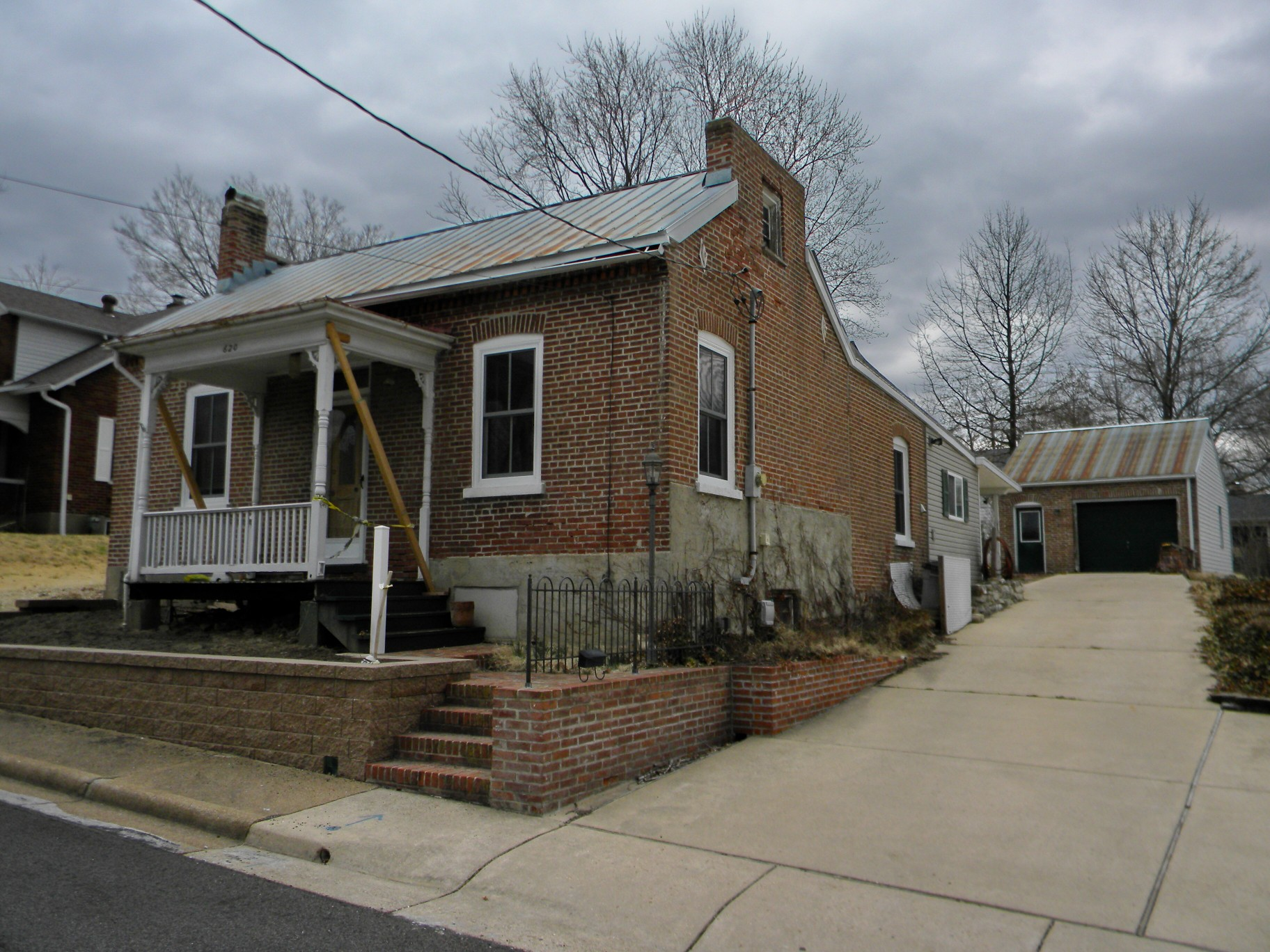
- Beins House, March 2014

- Location within Missouri Location within the United States
- Location: 620 Locust Street, Washington, Missouri
- Coordinates: 38°33′13″N 91°0′39″W
- Area: less than one acre
- Built: c. 1868
- Architectural style: Missouri-German
- MPS: Washington, Missouri MPS
- NRHP reference No.: 00001091
- Added to NRHP: September 14, 2000

Henry Beins House (also known as the Frederick William and Anna Beins House) is a historic house located at 620 Locust Street in Washington, Franklin County, Missouri.

== Description and history ==
It was built about 1868, and is a 1 1/2-story, three-bay, hall-and-parlor plan brick dwelling on a brick foundation. It has a side-gable roof and segmental arched door and window openings. It has an open frame porch which has simple Victorian style ornamentation.

It was listed on the National Register of Historic Places on September 14, 2000.
