= Frank Mense House =

Historic house in Missouri, United States

- U.S. National Register of Historic Places
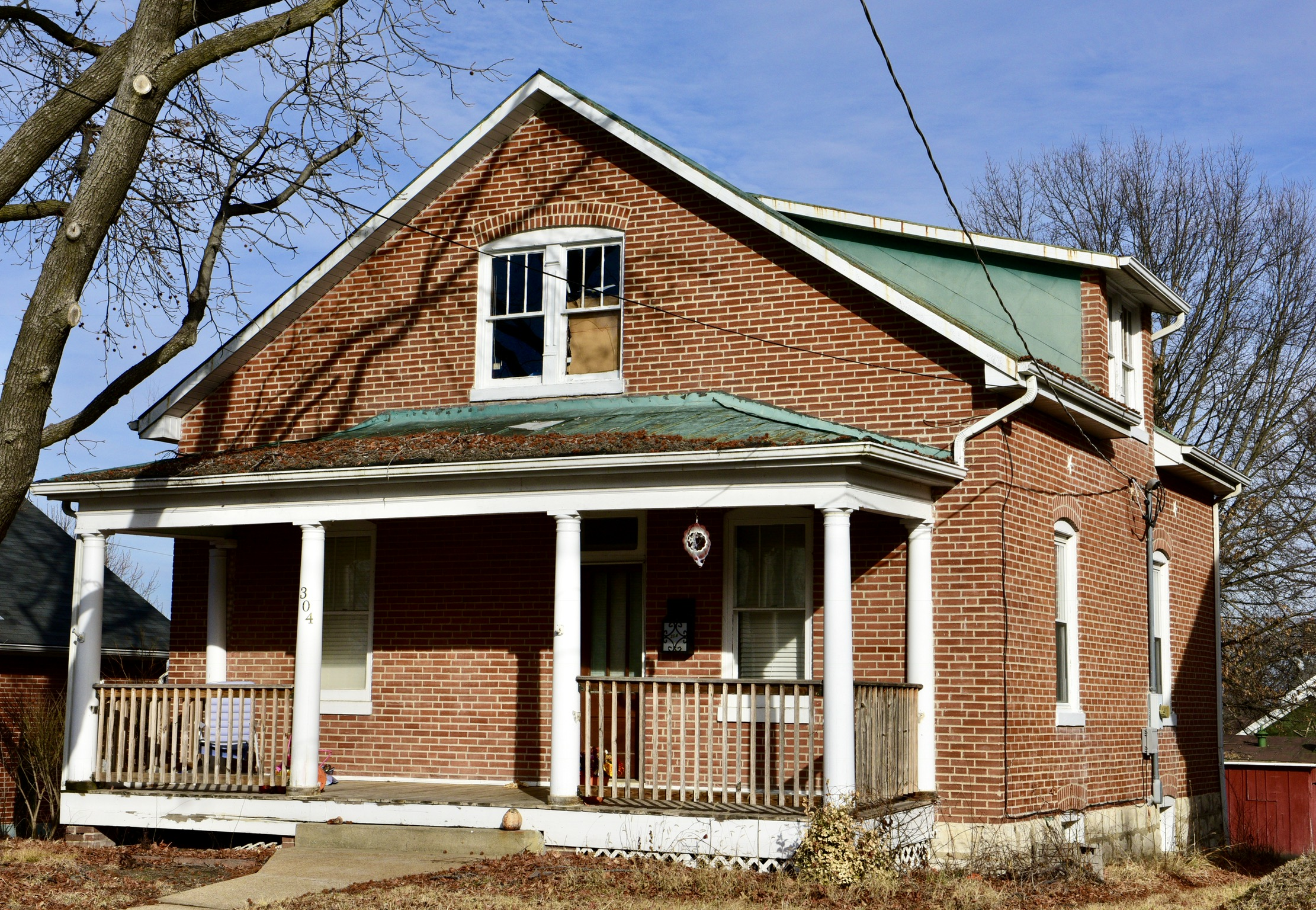

- Location within Missouri Location within the United States
- Location: 304 High St. Washington, Missouri
- Coordinates: 38°33′37″N 91°1′29″W
- Area: less than one acre
- Built: c. 1923
- Architectural style: Gable Front
- MPS: Washington, Missouri MPS
- NRHP reference No.: 00001107
- Added to NRHP: September 14, 2000

Frank Mense House is a historic home located at Washington, Franklin County, Missouri. It was built about 1923, and is a 1 1/2-story, three-bay, gable front brick dwelling on a stone foundation. It has a full-with front porch and segmental arched door and window openings.

It was listed on the National Register of Historic Places in 2000.
