= Spaunhorst and Mayn Building =

- U.S. National Register of Historic Places
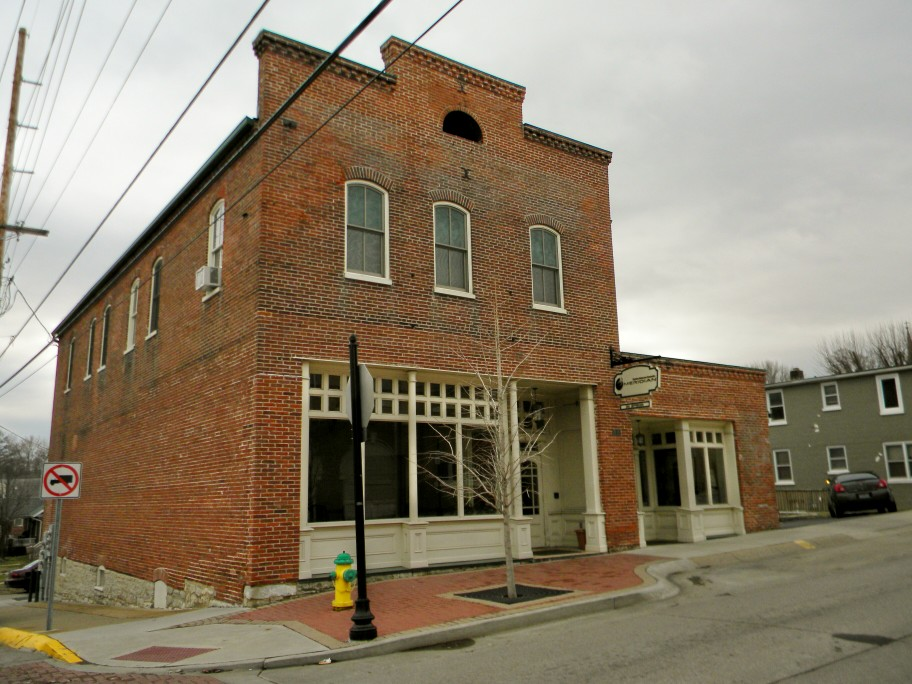
- Spaunhorst Building, March 2014

- Location within Missouri Location within the United States
- Location: 300-305 Jefferson St., Washington, Missouri
- Coordinates: 38°33′31″N 91°0′40″W
- Area: less than one acre
- Built: c. 1870, c. 1892
- Architectural style: Missouri-German
- MPS: Washington, Missouri MPS
- NRHP reference No.: 07000041
- Added to NRHP: February 16, 2007

Spaunhorst and Mayn Building is a historic mixed-use commercial and residential building located at Washington, Franklin County, Missouri. The original two-story brick section was built about 1870, with a one-story addition built about 1892. It sits on a limestone foundation.

It was listed on the National Register of Historic Places in 2007.
