= J. C. Peters House =

Historic house in Iowa, United States

- U.S. National Register of Historic Places
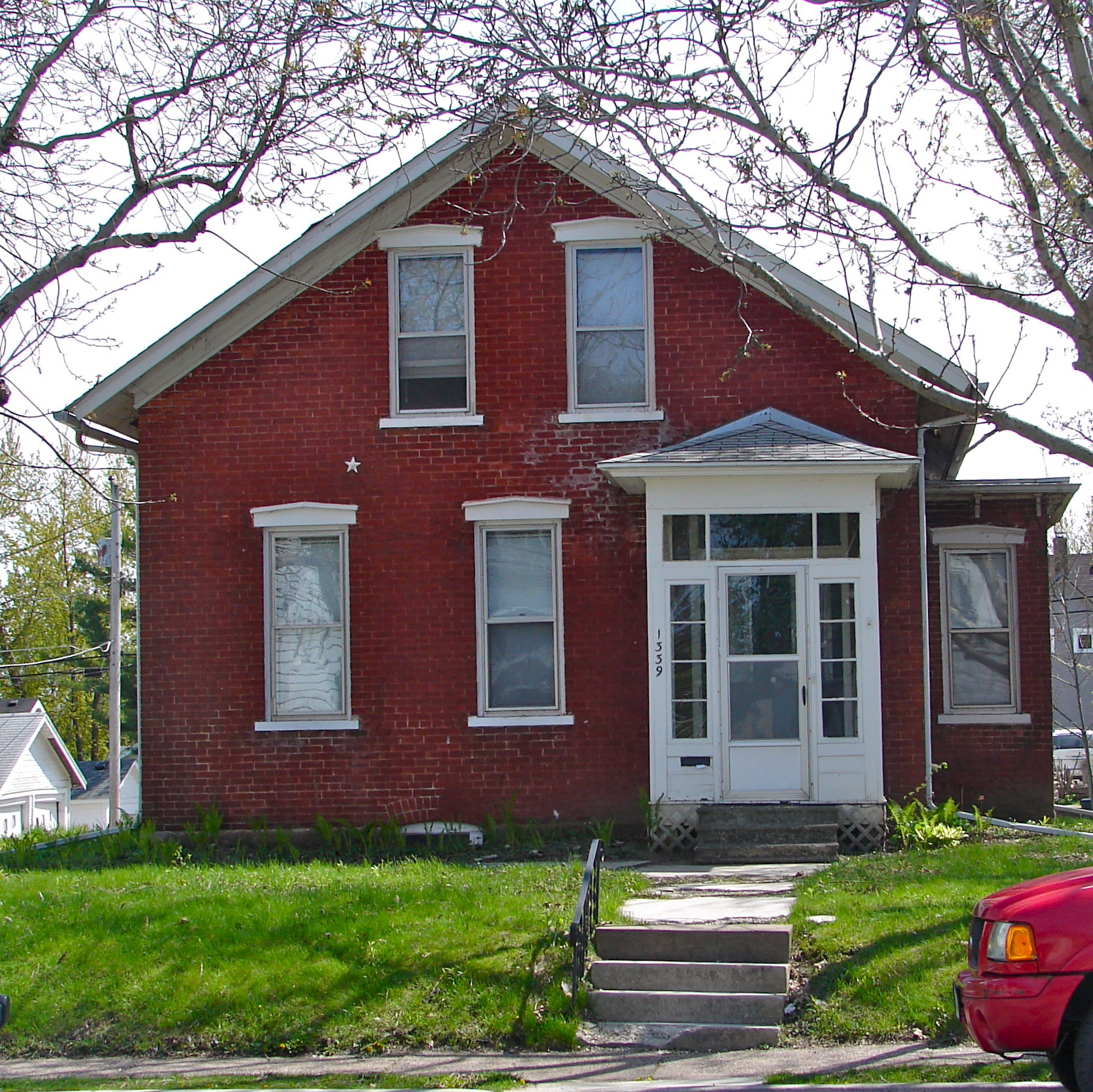

- Location within Iowa Location within the United States
- Location: 1339 W. 13th St. Davenport, Iowa
- Coordinates: 41°31′57″N 90°35′35″W
- Area: Less than 1 acre (0.40 ha)
- Built: 1865
- Architectural style: Greek Revival
- MPS: Davenport MRA
- NRHP reference No.: 84001500
- Added to NRHP: July 27, 1984

The J. C. Peters House is a historic building located in the West End of Davenport, Iowa, United States. While he was probably not the original occupant of the house, J. C. Peters and his family lived here from 1884 into the 1890s. Peters, who had been a farmer, was of German descent and represents the ethnic makeup of this northwest Davenport neighborhood. The house itself is a Greek Revival structure, which is one of the original architectural styles used in Davenport. It pre-dates most of the other houses in the neighborhood. The 1½-story, brick house, follows a rectangular plan. It features a three-bay front, a rectangular bay on the east side and an addition off the back of the house. The entrance vestibule on the front of the house is also an addition. It has been listed on the National Register of Historic Places since 1984.
