= Bethel Church (Labadie, Missouri) =

Historic church in Missouri, United States

- U.S. National Register of Historic Places
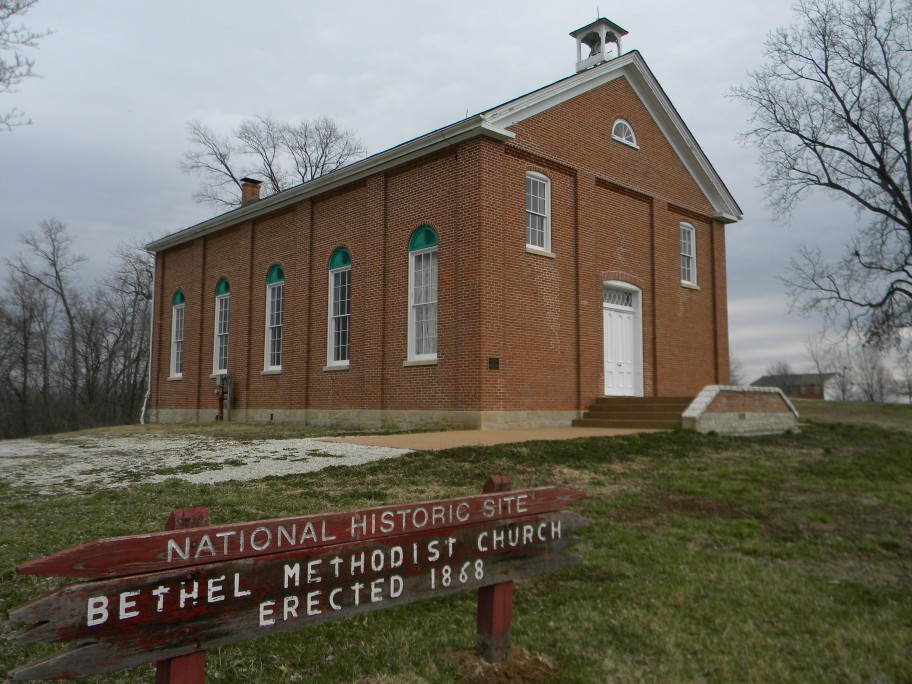

- Location within Missouri Location within the United States
- Nearest city: Labadie, Missouri
- Coordinates: 38°31′7″N 90°52′44″W
- Area: less than one acre
- Built: 1868
- Architectural style: Greek Revival
- NRHP reference No.: 92001867
- Added to NRHP: February 3, 1993

Bethel Church (also known as New Bethel Church or Bethel Methodist Church) is a historic Methodist church located on Missouri Highway T near Labadie, Missouri. The church was built in 1868 to replace a log building constructed in 1840 for Franklin County's first Methodist congregation. The red brick building has an unornamented Greek Revival design. The building has a Greek temple form with a low gable roof and square brick pilasters flanking the door and separating the large side windows. The interior of the church has a high ceiling, a balcony above the narthex, and white-painted features.

The church was added to the National Register of Historic Places in 1993.
