= Labadie, Missouri =

Labadie
- Unincorporated community
- Labadie in October 2026

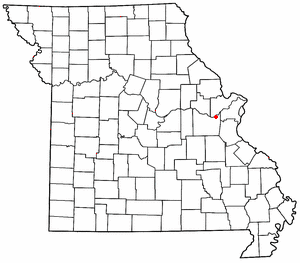
- Coordinates: 38°31′44″N 90°51′00″W
- Country: United States
- State: Missouri
- County: Franklin County

Population
  - Total: 2,394
- Postal code: 63055

Labadie (/ˈlæbədi/ LAB-ə-dee) is an unincorporated community in Franklin County, Missouri, United States. It is located approximately three miles north of Gray Summit.

== History ==
The community is named after Sylvester L'Abaddie, a hunter who (by some accounts) was killed by a bear in nearby Labaddie's Cave. A county history published in 1968, however, records that he "died peacefully in his bed in his 70th year, on July 25, 1849, at his home on Olive Street in St. Louis." Labadie post office was established June 7, 1855. Labaddie Creek enters the Missouri River here, and this was the location of Labaddie Station of the Missouri Pacific Railroad.

== Notable Places ==
The Bethel Church and James North House are listed on the National Register of Historic Places.

Labadie Energy Center, a coal-fired power plant owned by Ameren, began generation in 1970. In 2019, Ameren was ordered by a federal judge to install equipment at the plant to reduce its carbon emissions. Ameren has also faced backlash from community environmentalist groups due to the coal ash landfill located on the energy center's property.
