= John Abkemeyer House =

Historic house in Missouri, United States

- U.S. National Register of Historic Places
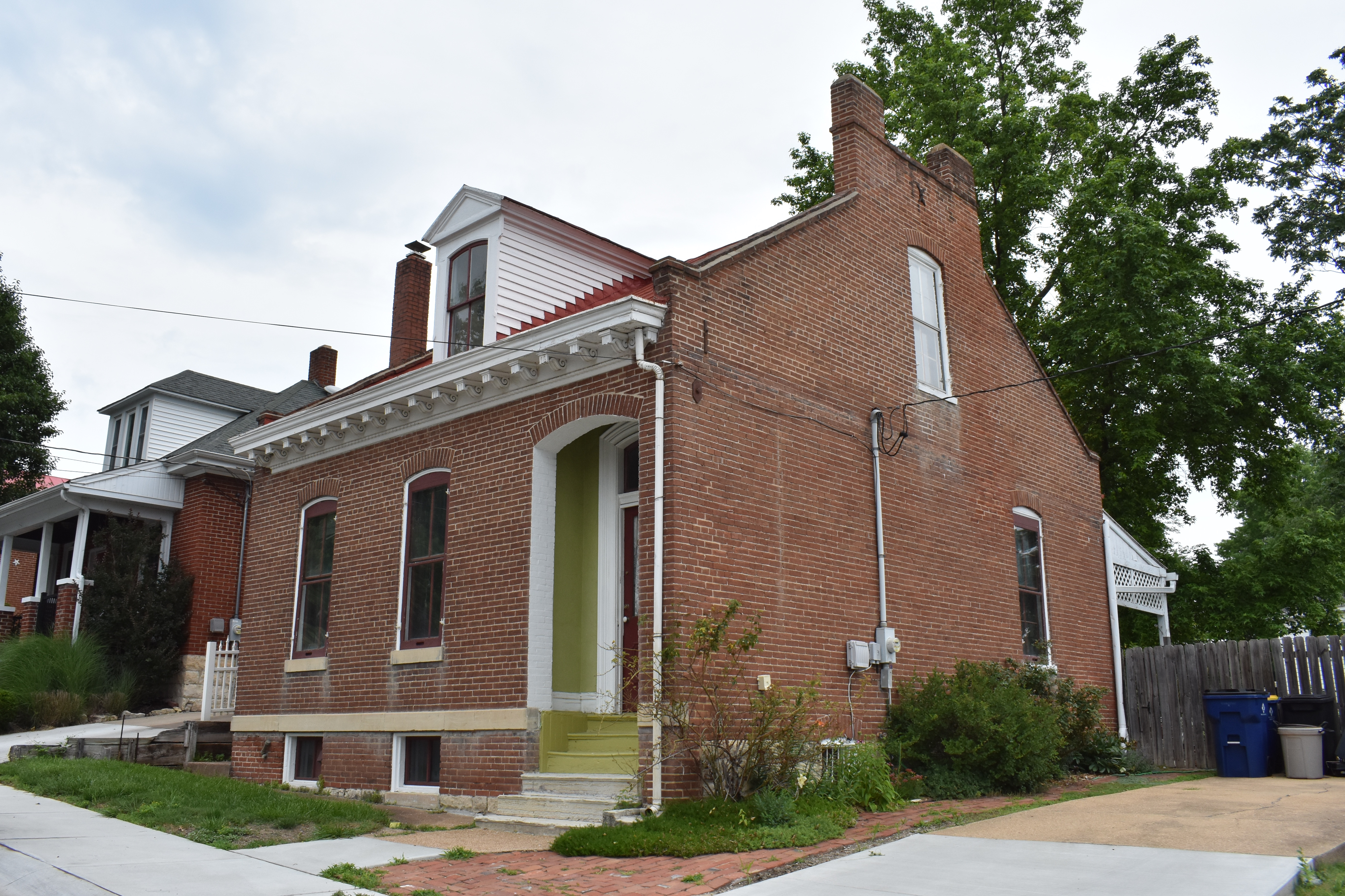

- Location within Missouri Location within the United States
- Location: 607 Jefferson, Washington, Missouri
- Coordinates: 38°33′17″N 91°0′48″W
- Area: less than one acre
- Built: 1914
- Architectural style: Missouri-German
- MPS: Washington, Missouri MPS
- NRHP reference No.: 00001088
- Added to NRHP: September 28, 2000

John Abkemeyer House is a historic home located at Washington, Franklin County, Missouri. It was built about 1914, and is a 1 1/2-story, three bay hall and parlor plan, brick dwelling on a stone foundation. It has a side gable roof, segmental-arched door and window openings, and open hip roofed front porch.

It was listed on the National Register of Historic Places in 2000.
