= John and Wilhelmina Helm House =

Historic house in Missouri, United States

- U.S. National Register of Historic Places
- Location within Missouri Location within the United States
- Location: 536 E. 5th St., Washington, Missouri
- Coordinates: 38°33′11″N 91°0′24″W
- Area: less than one acre
- Built: . 1868
- Architectural style: Missouri-German
- MPS: Washington, Missouri MPS
- NRHP reference No.: 00001100
- Added to NRHP: September 14, 2000

John and Wilhelmina Helm House is a historic home located at Washington, Franklin County, Missouri. It was built about 1868, and is a one-story, five-bay, double entrance brick dwelling on a brick foundation. It has a side-gable roof and straight topped door and window openings. It was originally a three-bay, side entry facade, and had two more bays added sometime after 1869.

It was listed on the National Register of Historic Places in 2000.
