= Henry Charles Eitzen Building =

- U.S. National Register of Historic Places
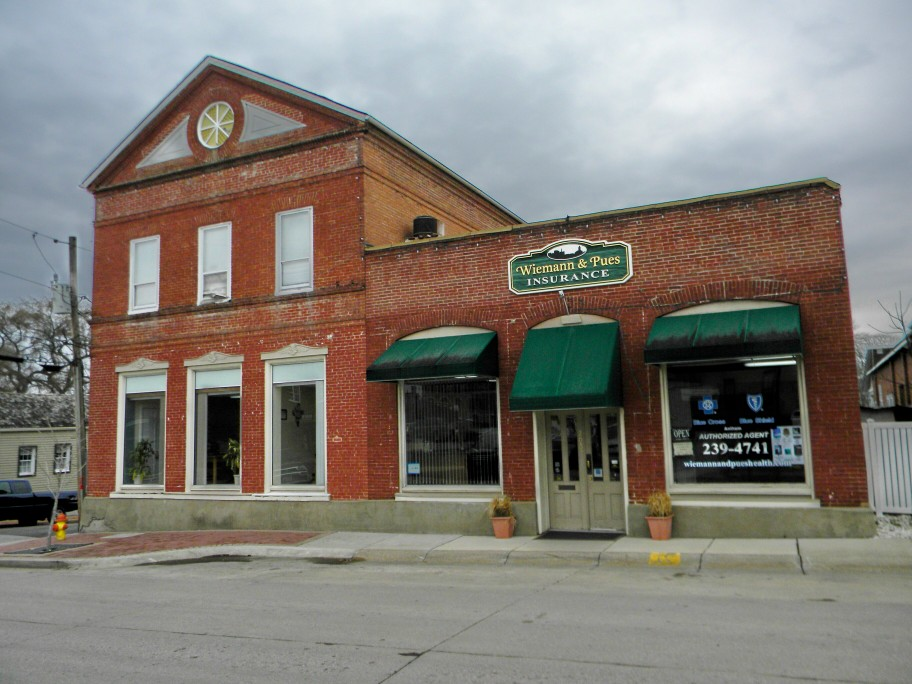
- Eitzen Building, March 2014

- Location within Missouri Location within the United States
- Location: 200 Jefferson St., Washington, Missouri
- Coordinates: 38°33′29″N 91°0′38″W
- Area: less than one acre
- Built: c. 1854
- Built by: Brix, Otto
- Architectural style: Klassisismus
- MPS: Washington, Missouri MPS
- NRHP reference No.: 00001096
- Added to NRHP: September 14, 2000

Henry Charles Eitzen Building, also known as the Oscar H. Guether Store Building and Hy. Poppenheusen Tin Shop, is a historic commercial building located at Washington, Franklin County, Missouri. The original section was built about 1854, and is a 2 1/2-story, German Neoclassical style brick building in the Klassisismus form. It has a three-bay, one-story brick ell added before 1893.

It was listed on the National Register of Historic Places in 2000.
