= Henry J. Buhr House =

Historic house in Missouri, United States

- U.S. National Register of Historic Places
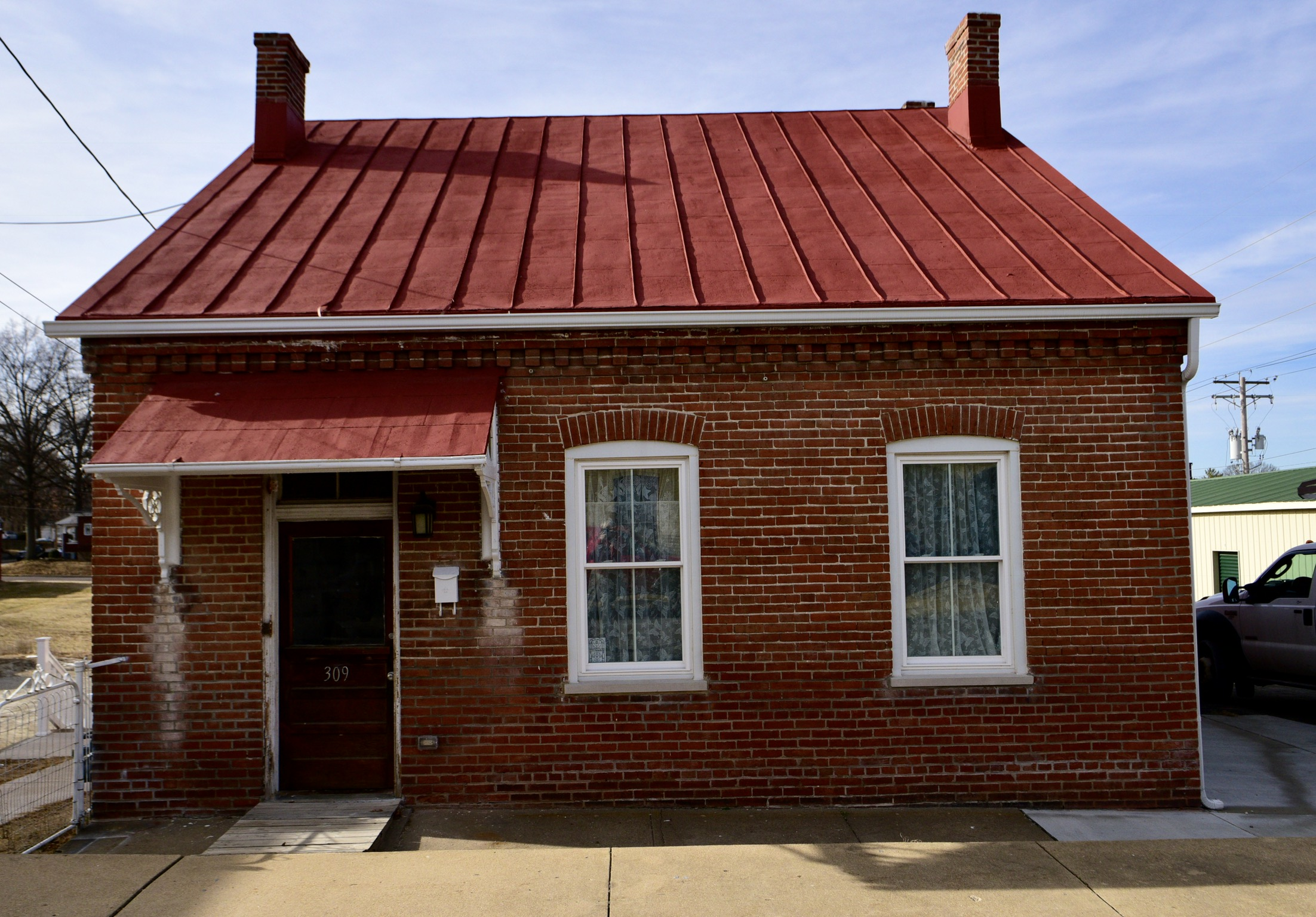

- Location within Missouri Location within the United States
- Location: 309 Lafayette St. Washington, Missouri
- Coordinates: 38°33′30″N 91°0′47″W
- Area: less than one acre
- Built: c. 1873
- Architectural style: Missouri-German
- MPS: Washington, Missouri MPS
- NRHP reference No.: 00001087
- Added to NRHP: September 14, 2000

Henry J. Buhr House is a historic home located at Washington, Franklin County, Missouri. It was built about 1873, and is a one to two-story, three-bay, side entry brick dwelling on a stone foundation and set on a hillside. It has a side-gable roof and segmental arched door and window openings.

It was listed on the National Register of Historic Places in 2000.
