= Moselle, Missouri =

Unincorporated community in Missouri, U.S.

Coordinates: 38°23′12″N 90°53′52″W

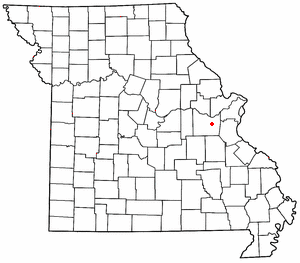

Moselle (/moʊˈzɛl/ moh-ZEL) is an unincorporated community in Franklin County, Missouri, United States. It is located approximately five miles northeast of St. Clair.

Moselle had its start in 1849 when a blast furnace was built at the site. The community most likely was named after Moselle, France. A post office called Moselle was established in 1860, and remained in operation until 1971.

The Moselle Iron Furnace Stack was listed on the National Register of Historic Places in 1969.

Moselle in October 2026

Moselle Iron Furnace Stack
