= John F. Schwegmann House =

Historic house in Missouri, United States

- U.S. National Register of Historic Places
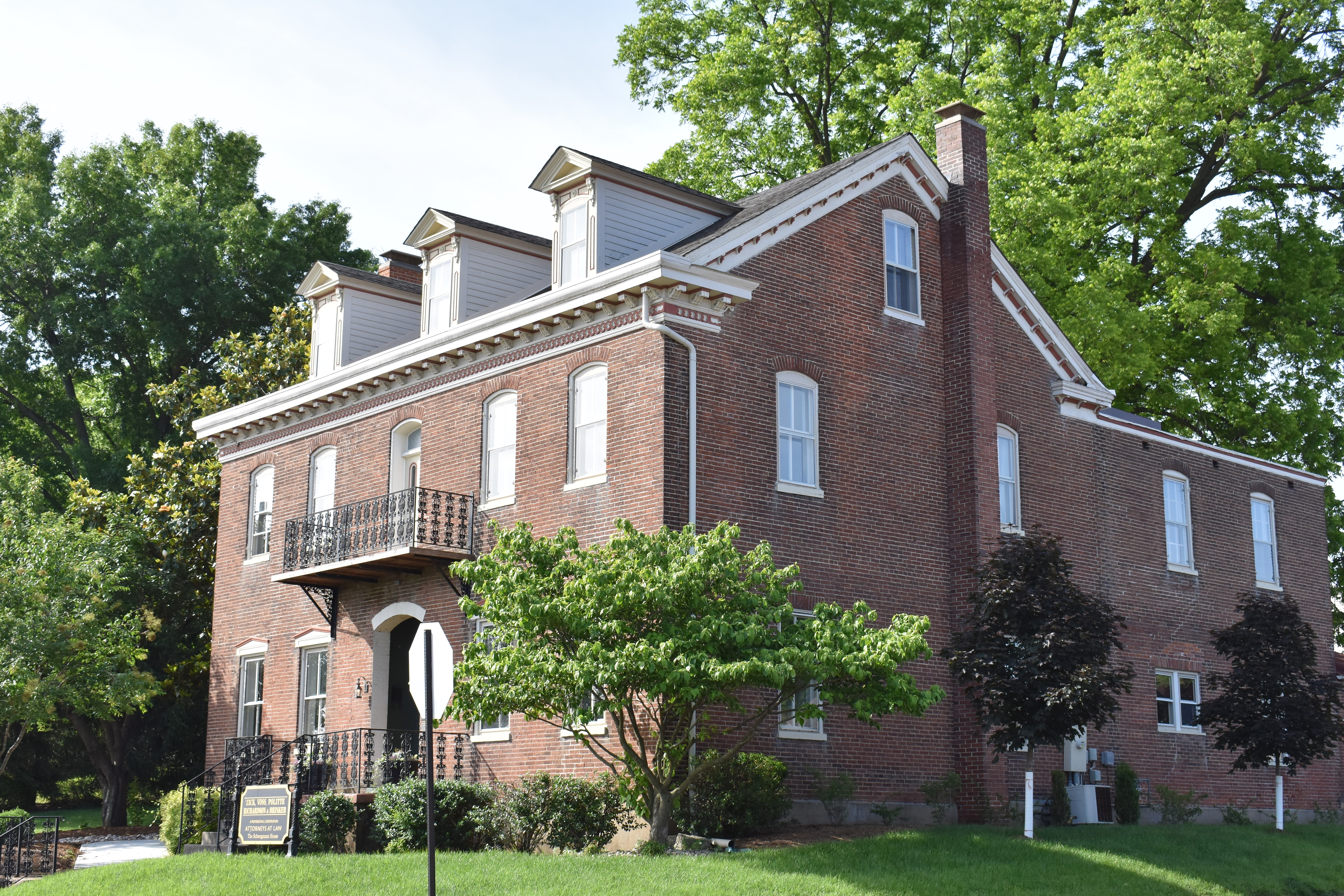
- Schwegmann House, May 2026

- Location within Missouri Location within the United States
- Location: 438 W. Front St., Washington, Missouri
- Coordinates: 38°33′45″N 91°0′54″W
- Area: less than one acre
- Built: 1861
- Architectural style: Georgian
- NRHP reference No.: 84002538
- Added to NRHP: March 22, 1984

John F. Schwegmann House is a historic home located at Washington, Franklin County, Missouri. It was built in 1861, and is a two-story, double pile, Georgian form brick dwelling with Italianate and Greek Revival style detailing. It has two shed roofed rear additions. It has a side gable roof with dormers and a replicated original iron balcony and wrought iron railings.

It was listed on the National Register of Historic Places in 1984.
