= William T. Vitt House =

Historic house in Missouri, United States

- U.S. National Register of Historic Places
- Location within Missouri Location within the United States
- Location: 2 River Pilot Dr., Washington, Missouri
- Coordinates: 38°33′11″N 90°59′49″W
- Area: less than one acre
- Built: c. 1888
- Architectural style: Missouri-German
- MPS: Washington, Missouri MPS
- NRHP reference No.: 00001117
- Added to NRHP: September 14, 2000

William T. Vitt House, also known as the Louis Schaefer House, is a historic home located at Washington, Franklin County, Missouri. It was built in 1888, and is a 2 1/2-story, three-bay, side entry brick dwelling on a stone foundation. It has a side gable roof and segmental arched door and window openings. It features a Victorian style front porch.

It was listed on the National Register of Historic Places in 2000.
