= John Glaser Pottery Factory =

- Formerly listed on the U.S. National Register of Historic Places
- Location: 812 W. Front St., Washington, Missouri
- Area: less than one acre
- Built: c. 1878, c. 1890
- Architectural style: Fachwerk Factory Building
- MPS: Washington, Missouri MPS
- NRHP reference No.: 00001098

Significant dates
- Added to NRHP: September 14, 2001
- Removed from NRHP: August 26, 2006

John Glaser Pottery Factory, also known as the Archibald S. Bryan Building, was a historic pottery factory building located at Washington, Franklin County, Missouri, United States. It was built about 1879, and expanded about 1890. It was a one-story with basement, heavy timber frame building in the Fachwerk form. It was set into a hillside and located close to the river and the railroad tracks. The factory operated until about 1901 and later converted to residential use.

It was listed on the National Register of Historic Places in 2001 and delisted in 2006.
