= George Tamm Building =

- U.S. National Register of Historic Places
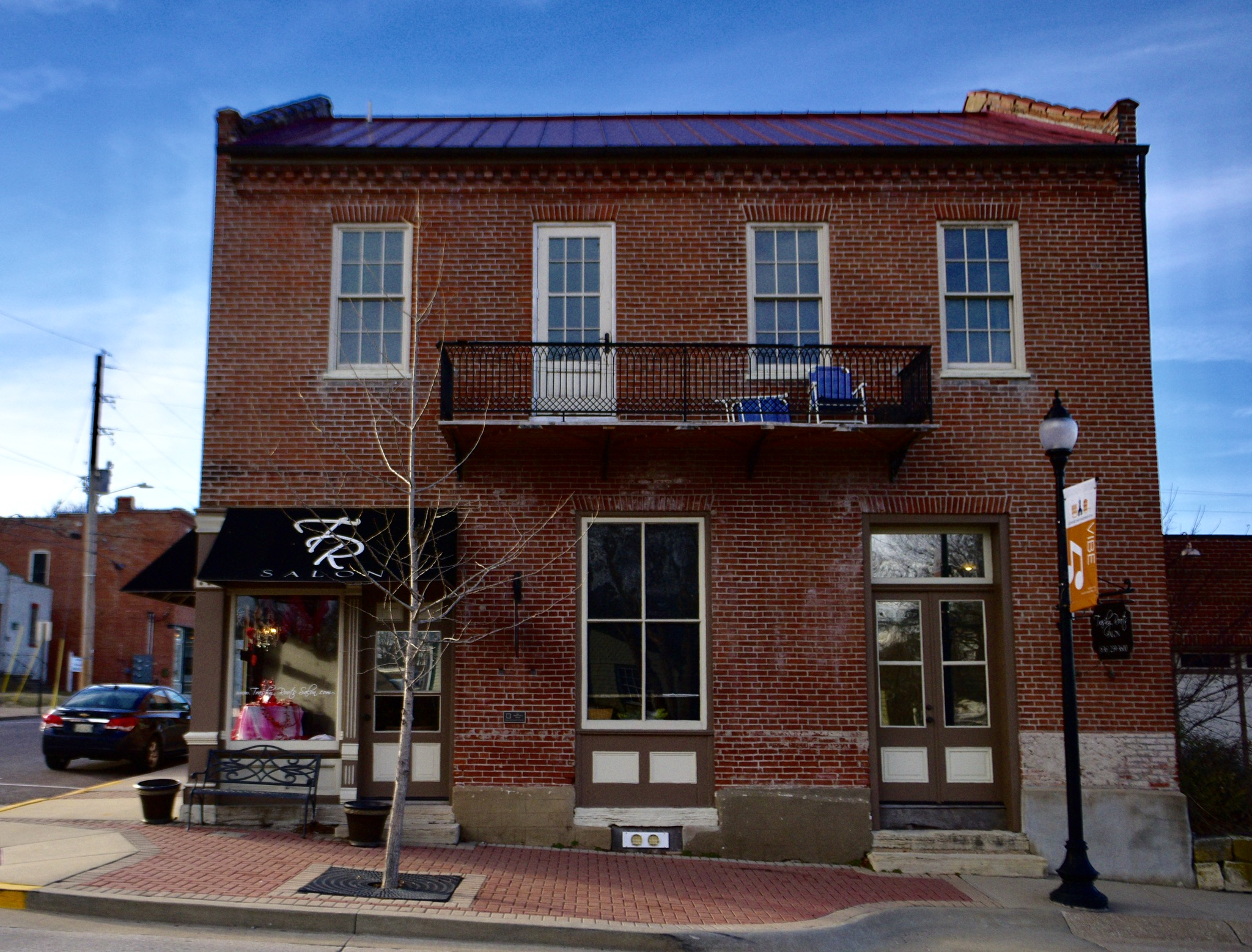

- Location within Missouri Location within the United States
- Location: 121 Jefferson St. Washington, Missouri
- Coordinates: 38°33′32″N 91°0′39″W
- Area: less than one acre
- Built: c. 1863
- Architectural style: Missouri-German, Federal
- MPS: Washington, Missouri MPS
- NRHP reference No.: 00001115
- Added to NRHP: September 14, 2000

George Tamm Building, also known as the Washington Citizen Building, is a historic commercial building located at Washington, Franklin County, Missouri. It was built about 1863, and is a two-story, Federal style brick building. It features a corner storefront on the first floor and a large ornamental iron balcony.

It was listed on the National Register of Historic Places in 2000.
