= Fred Schnier Building =

- U.S. National Register of Historic Places
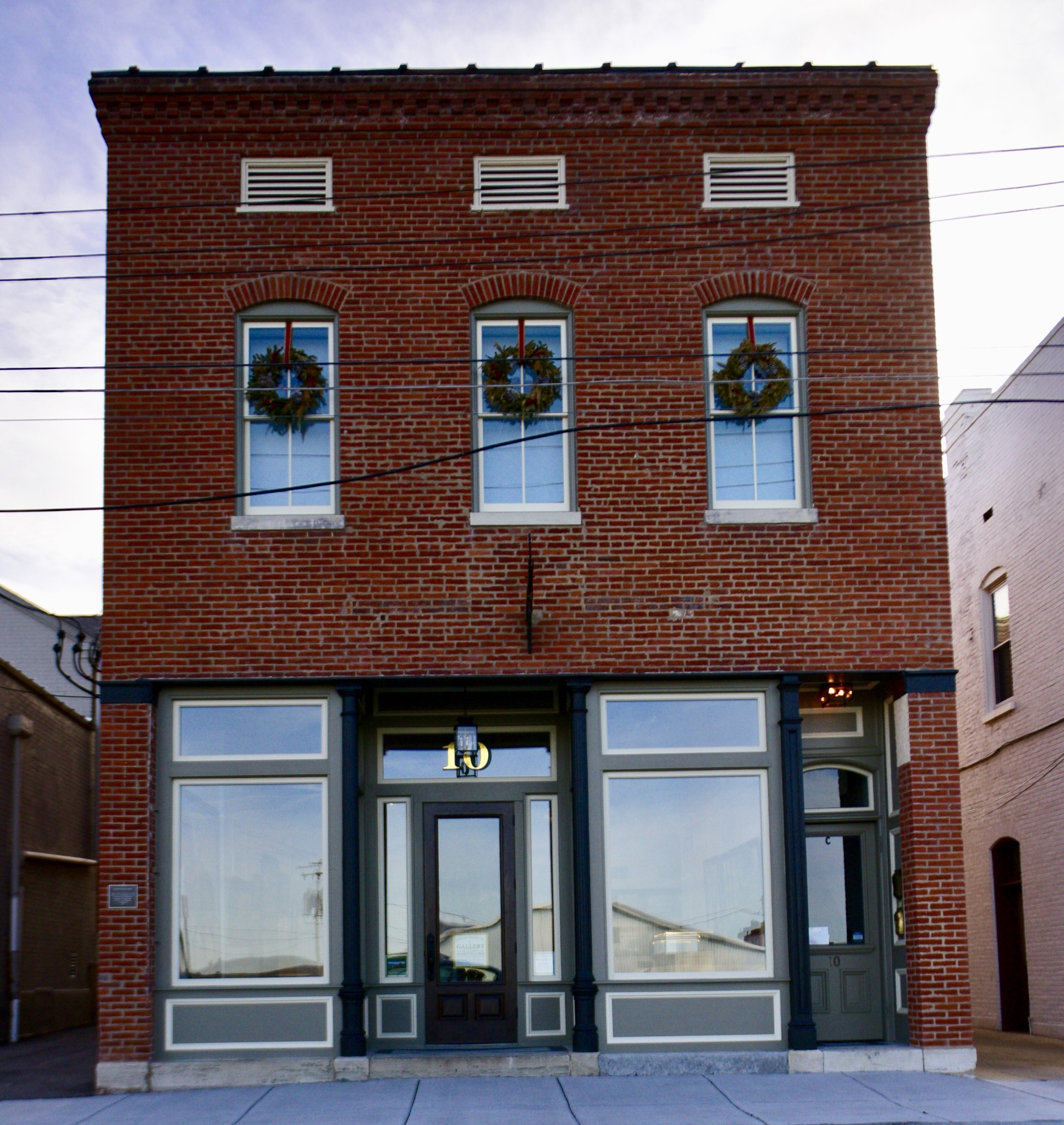

- Location within Missouri Location within the United States
- Location: 10-12 W. 2nd St. Washington, Missouri
- Coordinates: 38°33′31″N 91°0′41″W
- Area: less than one acre
- Built: c. 1883
- Architectural style: Missouri-German
- MPS: Washington, Missouri MPS
- NRHP reference No.: 00001113
- Added to NRHP: September 14, 2000

Fred Schnier Building is a historic commercial building located at Washington, Franklin County, Missouri. It was built about 1883, and is a two-story, narrow rectangular brick building with a flat roof. It has a two-story rear addition with a one-story extension. It has a large storefront on the first floor and residence on the second floor.

It was listed on the National Register of Historic Places in 2000.
