= Jonathan L. Tuepker House =

Historic house in Missouri, United States

- U.S. National Register of Historic Places
- Location within Missouri Location within the United States
- Location: 519 Stafford St., Washington, Missouri
- Coordinates: 38°33′24″N 91°1′11″W
- Area: less than one acre
- Built: 1911
- Architectural style: Gabled Ell
- MPS: Washington, Missouri MPS
- NRHP reference No.: 00001116
- Added to NRHP: September 14, 2000

Jonathan L. Tuepker House, also known as the Anna Bocklage House, is a historic home located at Washington, Franklin County, Missouri. It was built about 1911, and is a 1 1/2-story, three-bay, brick dwelling with a rear ell on a stone foundation. It has a gable roof and segmental arched door and window openings. It features a Victorian style front porch.

It was listed on the National Register of Historic Places in 2000.
