= John B. Busch Brewery Historic District =

Historic district in Missouri, United States

- U.S. National Register of Historic Places
- U.S. Historic district
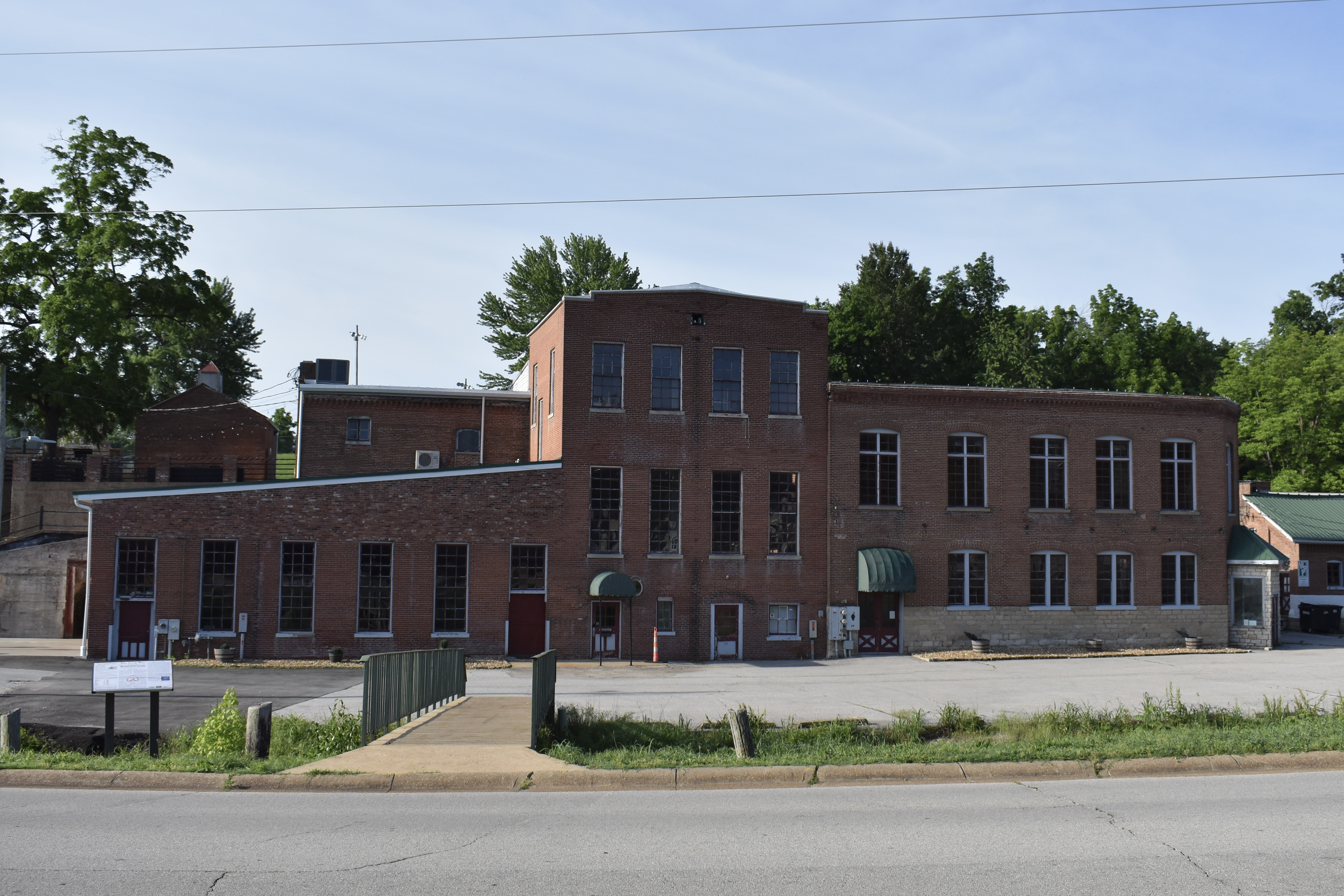
- John B. Busch Brewery Historic District, May 2026

- Location within Missouri Location within the United States
- Location: 108-130A Busch Ave., Washington, Missouri
- Coordinates: 38°33′11″N 91°00′55″W
- Area: 3 acres (1.2 ha)
- Built: c. 1855
- Architectural style: Missouri-German
- MPS: Washington, Missouri MPS
- NRHP reference No.: 00001094
- Added to NRHP: September 14, 2000

John B. Busch Brewery Historic District is a historic brewery complex and national historic district located at Washington, Franklin County, Missouri. The complex developed between about 1855 and 1917. It includes the main brewery complex and two ice houses (c. 1888, c. 1897). The main brewery complex that is a multi-storied complex of buildings with five main sections. Much of the complex dates to 1888, with additions made in 1917. The cellars date to about 1855. The brewery closed in 1954.

It was listed on the National Register of Historic Places in 2000.
