= Stephen M. Jones Building =

- U.S. National Register of Historic Places
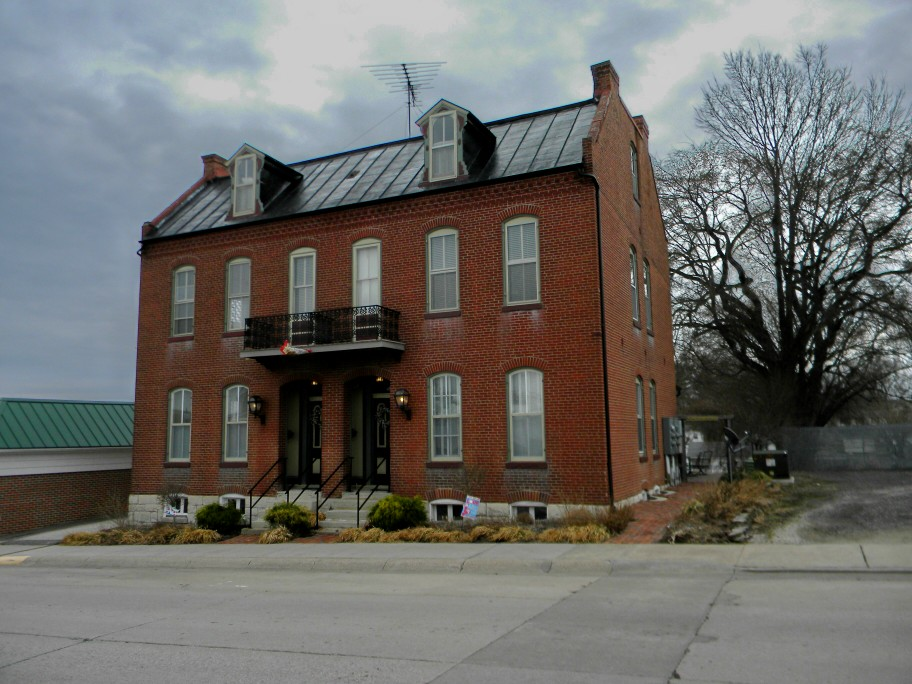
- Jones Building, March 2014

- Location within Missouri Location within the United States
- Location: 108-110 Jefferson St., Washington, Missouri
- Coordinates: 38°33′32″N 91°0′37″W
- Area: less than one acre
- Built: 1883
- Architectural style: Missouri-German
- MPS: Washington, Missouri MPS
- NRHP reference No.: 00001101
- Added to NRHP: September 14, 2000

Stephen M. Jones Building is a historic multi-family dwelling located at Washington, Franklin County, Missouri. It was built in 1883, and is a 2 1/2-story, six-bay, brick building with a side-facing flattened gable roof covered. It features paired brick chimneys in the gabled ends, segmental arched windows, and a brick denticulated cornice.

It was listed on the National Register of Historic Places in 2000.
