= Caldwell Farm =

- U.S. National Register of Historic Places
- Location within Missouri Location within the United States
- Location: S of Washington on Bieker Rd., near Washington, Missouri
- Coordinates: 38°30′32″N 90°59′01″W
- Area: 2.6 acres (1.1 ha)
- Built: c. 1882
- Built by: Caldwell, Samuel Kincaid
- Architectural style: German-Missouri Vernacular
- NRHP reference No.: 80002351
- Added to NRHP: October 20, 1980

Caldwell Farm, also known as The Caldwell Place, is a historic home and farm located near Washington, Franklin County, Missouri. The farmhouse was built about 1882, and is a two-story, central passage plan, red brick I-house. A rear ell was added about 1900 and extended about 1945. It sits on a rubble stone foundation and has a gable roof. It features a two-story porch. Also on the property are the contributing large barn (1897), two concrete silos, a poultry house, corn crib, feed-mixing shed, an old storage shed, garage and granary.

It was listed on the National Register of Historic Places in 1980.
