= Henry and Elizabeth Ernst House =

Historic house in Missouri, United States

- U.S. National Register of Historic Places
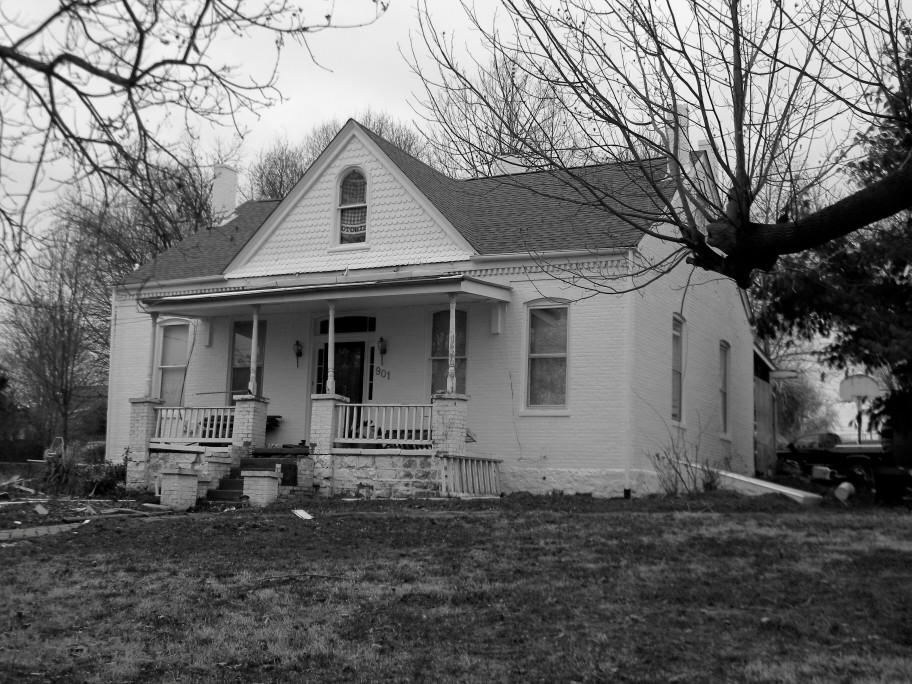
- Ernst House, March 2014

- Location within Missouri Location within the United States
- Location: 901 Stafford St., Washington, Missouri
- Coordinates: 38°33′09″N 91°01′11″W
- Area: less than one acre
- Built: c. 1874
- Architectural style: Missouri-German
- MPS: Washington, Missouri MPS
- NRHP reference No.: 00001097
- Added to NRHP: September 14, 2000

Henry and Elizabeth Ernst House is a historic home located at Washington, Franklin County, Missouri. It was built around 1874, and is a 1 1/2-storey, five-bay, central passage plan brick dwelling on a brick foundation. It has a side-gable roof and low segmental arched door and window openings. It features a front porch and a prominent front gable, which is sheathed with fish scale shingles. This gable was likely added in 1892 when the house was reconstructed following a fire..

It was listed on the National Register of Historic Places in 2000.
