= Moselle Iron Furnace Stack =

- U.S. National Register of Historic Places
- The Moselle Iron Furnace Stack in October 2026

- Location within Missouri Location within the United States
- Location: 1 mile SE of Moselle, near Moselle, Missouri
- Coordinates: 38°22′48″N 90°52′51″W
- Area: less than one acre
- Built: 1848–1849
- NRHP reference No.: 69000100
- Added to NRHP: May 21, 1969

Moselle Iron Furnace Stack is a historic iron furnace stack located near Moselle, Franklin County, Missouri. It was built in 1848–1849 by the Moselle Iron Furnace (1850–1854), and later operated as the Furnace of the Franklin Iron Mining Co. (1855–1859), and Moselle Iron Company (1874–1875). It is 31 feet high and constructed of cut stone blocks. The furnace was closed in early June 1875.

It was listed on the National Register of Historic Places in 1969.
