= Joseph Raaf House =

Historic house in Missouri, United States

- U.S. National Register of Historic Places
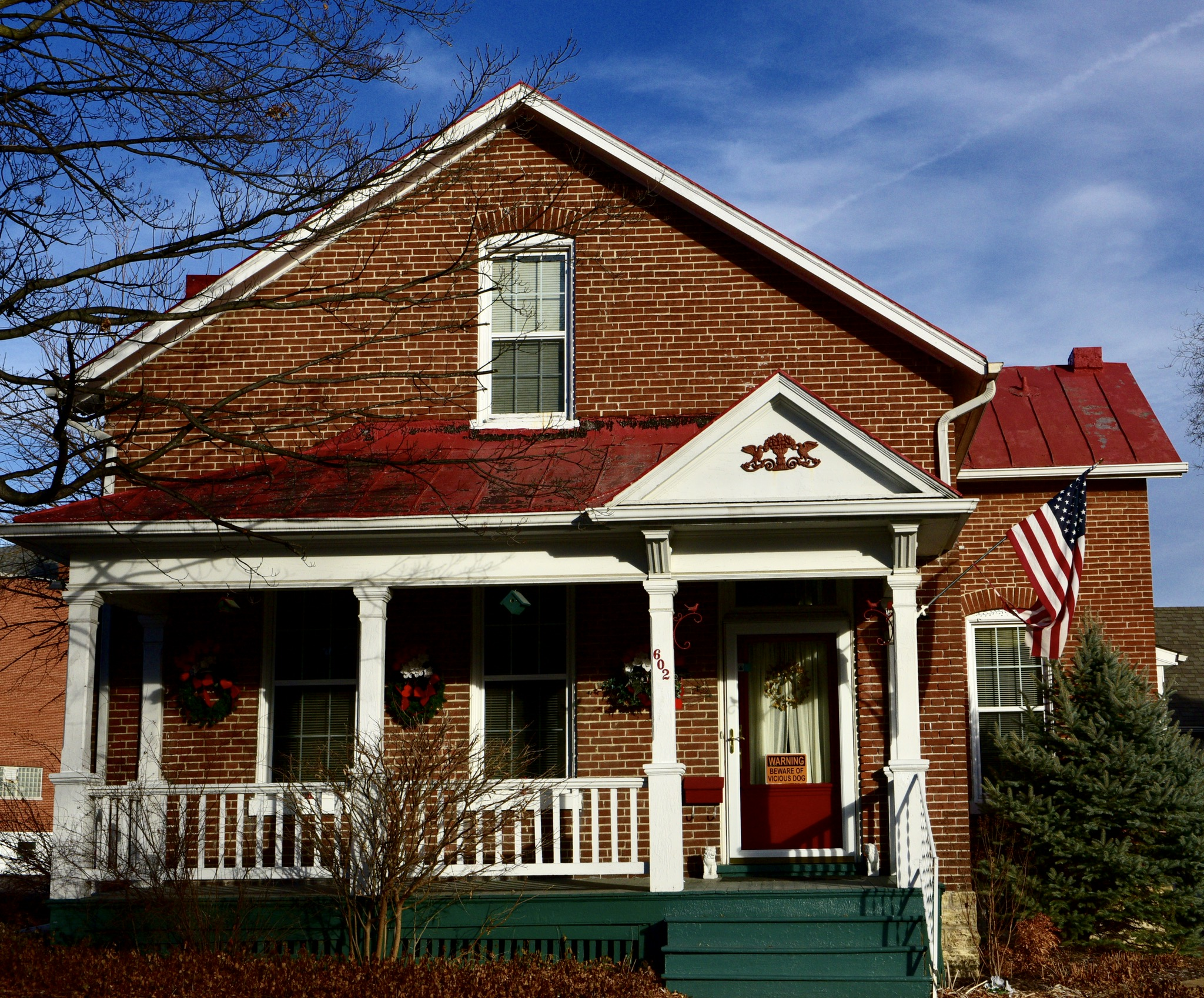

- Location within Missouri Location within the United States
- Location: 602 Jefferson St. Washington, Missouri
- Coordinates: 38°33′37″N 91°1′29″W
- Area: less than one acre
- Built: c. 1896
- Architectural style: Gabled Ell
- MPS: Washington, Missouri MPS
- NRHP reference No.: 00001112
- Added to NRHP: September 14, 2000

Joseph Raaf House is a historic home located at Washington, Franklin County, Missouri. It was built about 1896, and is a 1 1/2-story, brick dwelling with a rear ell on a stone foundation. The rear ell was in place by 1916. It has a gable roof and segmental arched door and window openings. It features a full-width front porch.

It was listed on the National Register of Historic Places in 2000.
