= Henry Bartelmann House =

Historic house in Missouri, United States

- U.S. National Register of Historic Places
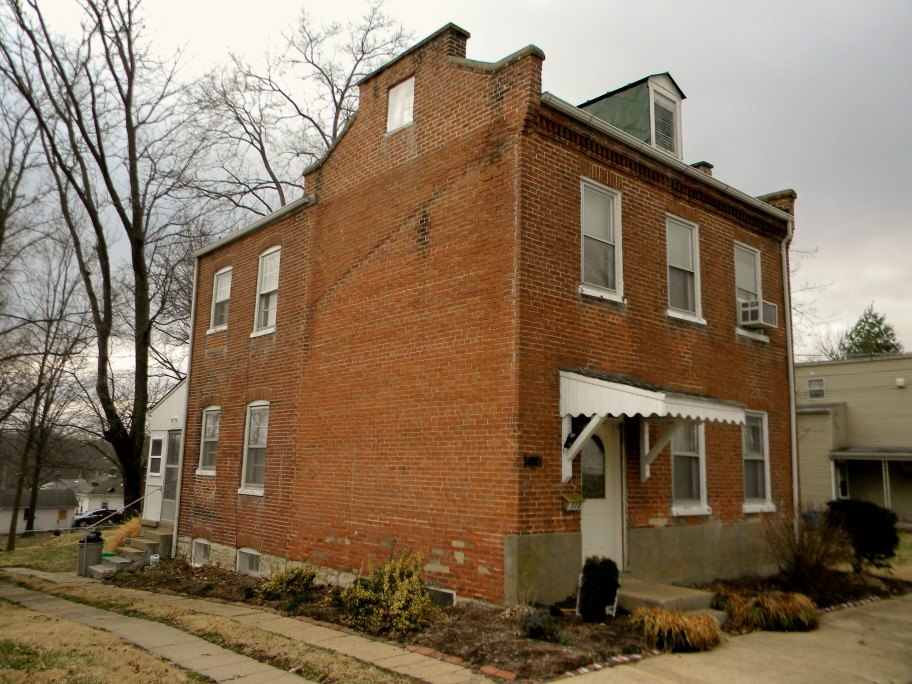
- Henry Bartelmann House, March 2014

- Location within Missouri Location within the United States
- Location: 110 W. 6th St., Washington, Missouri
- Coordinates: 38°33′21″N 91°0′54″W
- Area: less than one acre
- Built: 1860
- Architectural style: Missouri-German
- MPS: Washington, Missouri MPS
- NRHP reference No.: 00001089
- Added to NRHP: September 14, 2000

Henry Bartelmann House, also known as the Henry Geisecke House, is a historic home located at Washington, Franklin County, Missouri. It was built about 1860, and is a two-story, three-bay, side entry brick dwelling on a stone foundation. It has a side-gable roof and tall brick jack arched door and window openings.

It was listed on the National Register of Historic Places in 2000.
