= H. P. Broeker House =

Historic house in Missouri, United States

- H.P. Broeker House
- U.S. National Register of Historic Places
- Location within Missouri Location within the United States
- Location: 523 Hooker St., Washington, Missouri
- Coordinates: 38°33′17″N 91°0′39″W
- Area: less than one acre
- Built: c. 1868
- Architectural style: Missouri-German
- MPS: Washington, Missouri MPS
- NRHP reference No.: 00001147
- Added to NRHP: September 22, 2000

H.P. Broeker House is a historic home located at Washington, Franklin County, Missouri. It was built about 1868, and is a two-story, five-bay, brick dwelling on a brick foundation. It has a flat roof, one story shed-roofed rear ell, and low segmental arched door and window openings.

It was listed on the National Register of Historic Places in 2000.
