= Louis H. Peters House =

Historic house in Missouri, United States

- U.S. National Register of Historic Places
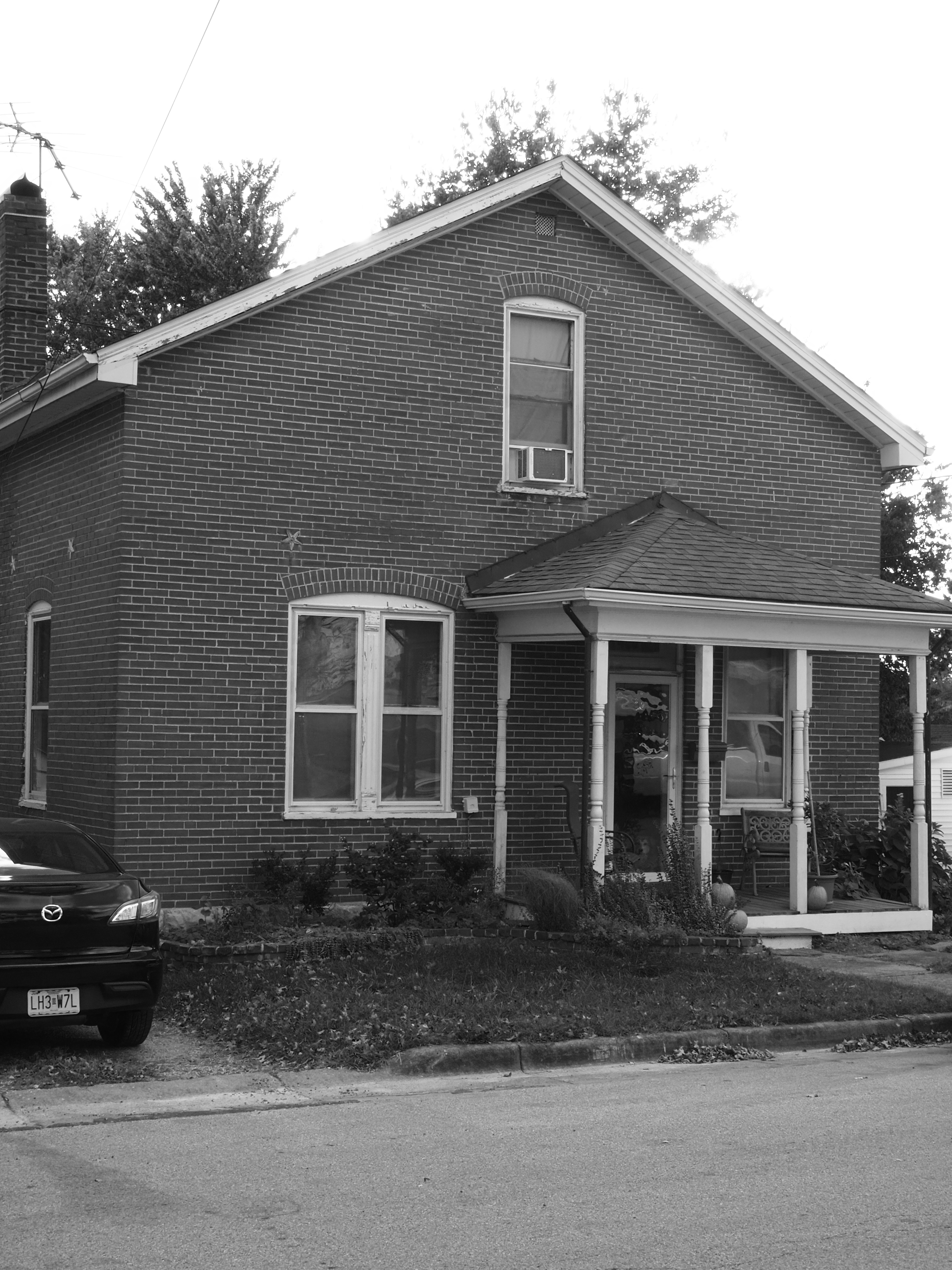

- Location within Missouri Location within the United States
- Location: 408 E. 6th St., Washington, Missouri
- Coordinates: 38°33′12″N 91°0′35″W
- Area: less than one acre
- Built: 1914
- Architectural style: Gable Front
- MPS: Washington, Missouri MPS
- NRHP reference No.: 00001111
- Added to NRHP: September 14, 2000

Louis H. Peters House is a historic home located at Washington, Franklin County, Missouri. It was built about 1914, and is a 1 1/2-story, two-bay, brick dwelling on a stone foundation. It has a front gable roof and segmental arched door and window openings. It features a Victorian style front porch.

It was listed on the National Register of Historic Places in 2000.
