= Henry C. Thias House =

Historic house in Missouri, United States

- U.S. National Register of Historic Places
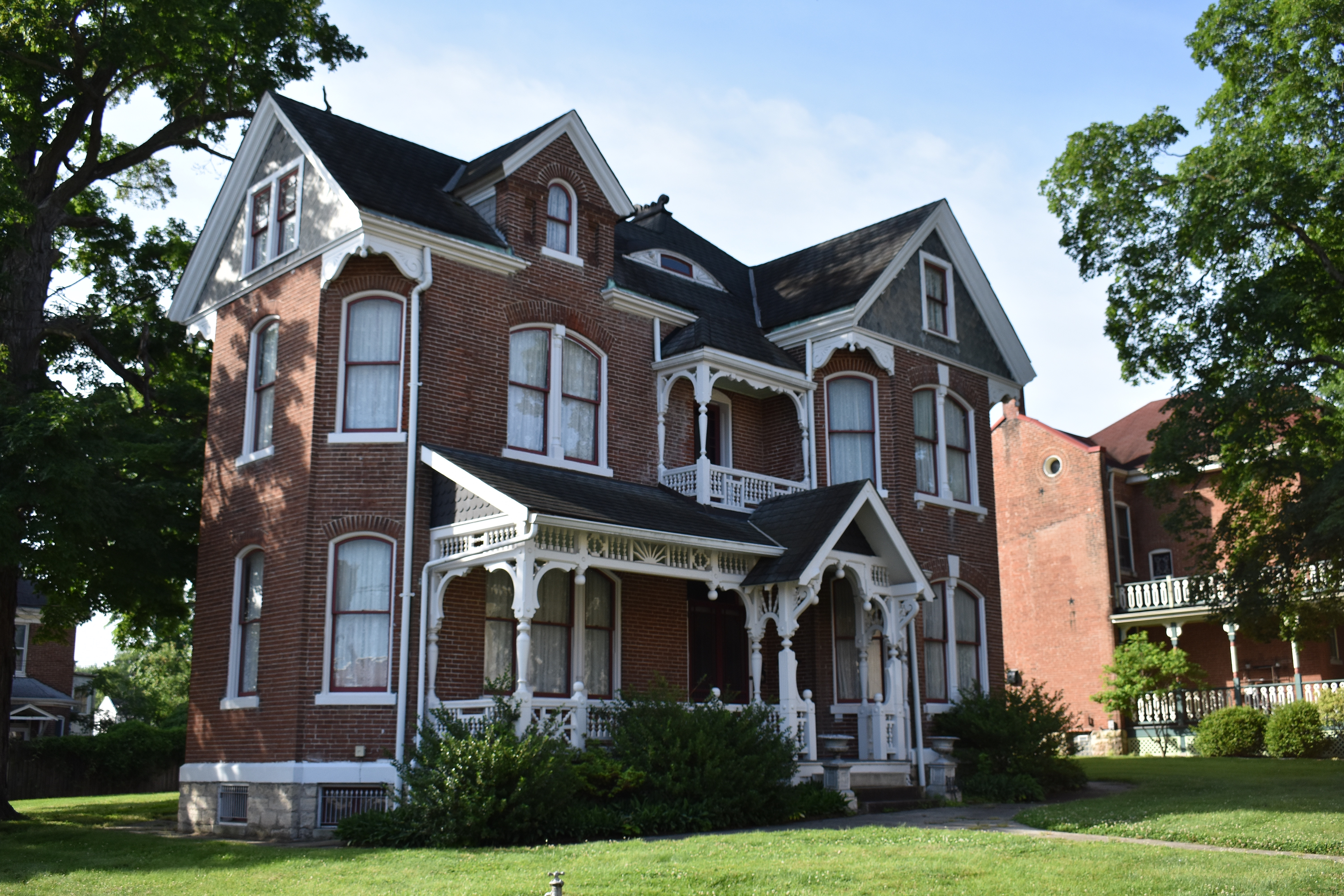
- Thias House, May 2026

- Location within Missouri Location within the United States
- Location: 304 Elm St., Washington, Missouri
- Coordinates: 38°33′32″N 91°0′51″W
- Area: less than one acre
- Built: 1888
- Built by: Thias, Henry C.
- Architectural style: Queen Anne
- NRHP reference No.: 84002539
- Added to NRHP: September 20, 1984

Henry C. Thias House, also known as the Forrest Swarz Residence, currently the Marc and Christina Houseman Residence, is a historic home located at Washington, Franklin County, Missouri. It was built in 1888, and is a two-story, Queen Anne brick dwelling. It features multiple porches with decorative spindlework.

It was listed on the National Register of Historic Places in 1984.
