= James North House =

Historic house in Missouri, United States

- U.S. National Register of Historic Places
- Location within Missouri Location within the United States
- Location: MO T, Labadie, Missouri
- Coordinates: 38°26′16″N 90°51′24″W
- Area: 4.3 acres (1.7 ha)
- Built: c. 1819
- Architectural style: Georgian
- NRHP reference No.: 84002534
- Added to NRHP: April 5, 1984

James North House, also known as The House, is a historic home located at Labadie, Franklin County, Missouri. It was built about 1819, and is a two-story, central passage plan, frame I-house. It is five bays wide and has a one-story front porch on stone piers.

It was listed on the National Register of Historic Places in 1984.
