= Franz Schwarzer House =

Historic house in Missouri, United States

- U.S. National Register of Historic Places
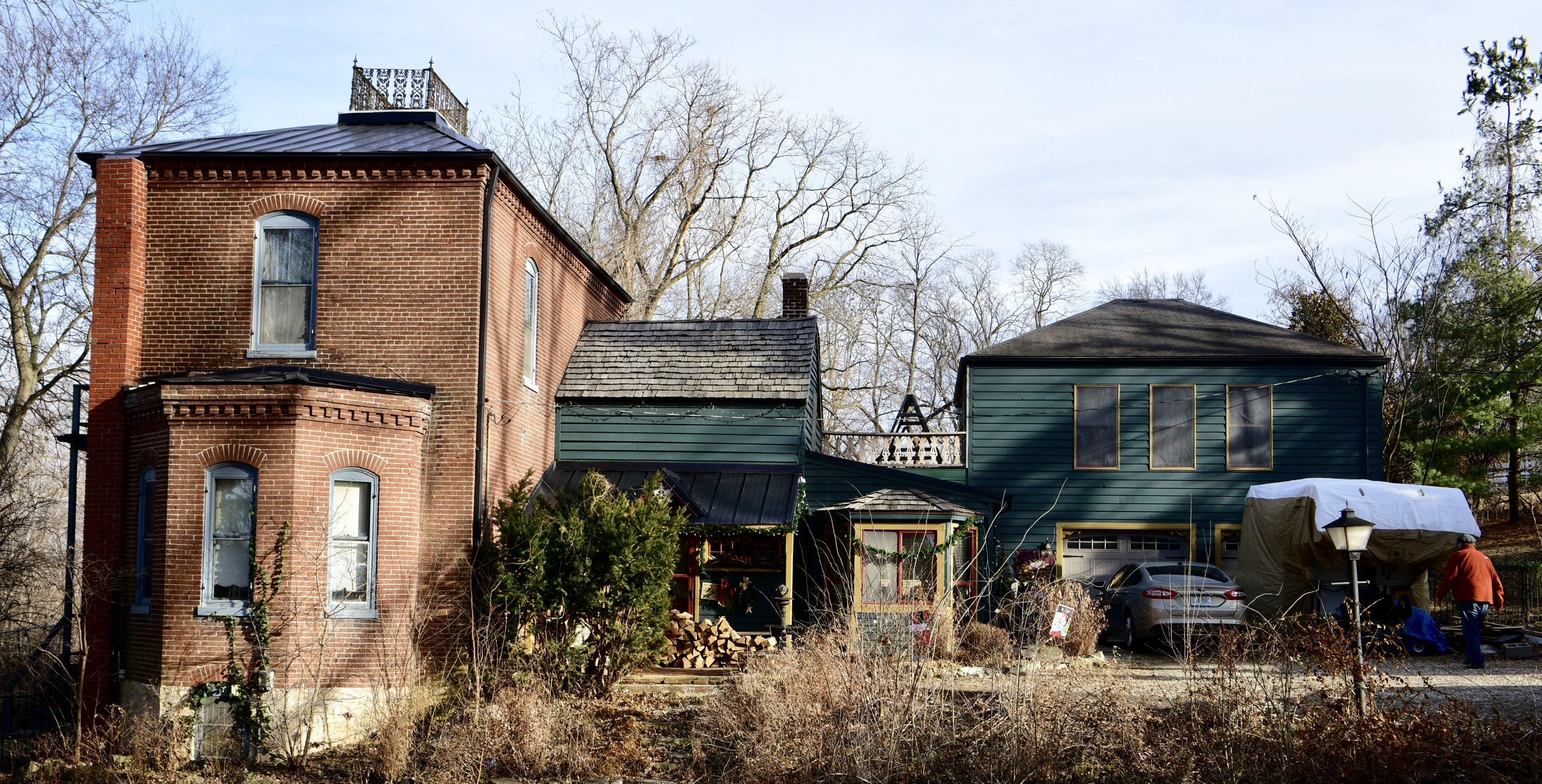

- Location within Missouri Location within the United States
- Location: 2 Walnut St. Washington, Missouri
- Coordinates: 38°33′31″N 91°0′28″W
- Area: 0.3 acres (0.12 ha)
- Built: 1872
- Architectural style: Late Victorian, German
- NRHP reference No.: 78001646
- Added to NRHP: July 17, 1978

Franz Schwarzer House is a historic home located at Washington, Franklin County, Missouri. It was built in two sections. The first section was built before 1868, and is a two-story, gable-roofed clapboarded structure with a one-story, lean-to addition. A two-story, hip-roofed brick dwelling of ell-shaped plan, was added in 1872. It features an ornate widow's walk and gingerbread porch/balcony in the Victorian style.

It was listed on the National Register of Historic Places in 1978.
