= Deegan =

Deegan is an Irish surname. Notable people with the surname include:

- Alfie Deegan (born 2001), English actor
- Annabel Deegan, executive producer of Amanpour
- Brian Deegan (lawyer) (born 1955), Australian political activist
- Cornelius S. Deegan (1901–1967), American politician
- Denby Deegan (1941–2018), American architect
- Denise Deegan (born 1952), English novelist and playwright
- Donna Deegan (born 1961), American journalist
- Gene A. Deegan (born 1936), American major general
- John Deegan (politician) (1845–1906), Irish politician
- Marilyn Deegan, British scientist and historian
- Mike Deegan, British healthcare chief executive
- Patricia Deegan, American psychologist
- Peter Deegan (born 1970), American attorney
- Robert P. Deegan, American academic administrator
- Tim Deegan, Canadian video jockey
- William Francis Deegan (1882–1932), American architect and engineer

== Fictional characters ==
- John Deegan (Fair City), detective in Fair City
- Prunella Deegan, voiced by Nicky Rapp in Arthur's Pet Chase
- Terry Deegan, character in Fair City
- T. J. Deegan, character in Fair City

== Sports ==
- Andrew Deegan (born 1995), Australian rugby player
- Bill Deegan (born 1935), American baseball umpire
- Brian Deegan (rider) (born 1974), American motorcycle racer
- Davinder Singh Deegan (born 1946), Kenyan field hockey player
- Dummy Deegan (1874–1957), American baseball player
- Gary Deegan (born 1987), Irish footballer
- Haiden Deegan (born 2006), American motorcycle racer
- Hailie Deegan (born 2001), American racing driver
- Jim Deegan (born 1933), British field hockey player
- Maurice Deegan (born 1972), Gaelic football referee
- Max Deegan (born 1996), Irish rugby player
- Mick Deegan (born 1964), Irish football manager
- Millie Deegan (1919–2002), American baseball player
- Paddy Deegan (born 1995), Irish hurler

== See also ==
- Degan (surname)
- Major Deegan Expressway – named after William Francis Deegan
- Murder of Edward Deegan
