= Degan =

Degan may refer to:

- Degan (surname), an anglicised Irish-language surname
- Degan of Treves (c. 800–850), Frankish Roman Catholic prelate
- Degan, Ethiopia, a town in Kalu (woreda), Ethiopia
- Degan Subdistrict, in Jiangjin District, China
- Degan, Churu, a village in India

== See also ==
- Degan Elementary School, an American public elementary school
- Degen (disambiguation)
- Degn (name)
