= Degen (surname) =

Degen is a surname of Swiss, German or Croatian origin. There are numerous unrelated families sharing the name, which can originate in a number of given names beginning in Degen- ("hero"); compare the Degener surname, from the German given name Degenher.

A family called Degen originally from Muotathal, Schwyz, rose to some prominence in the Swiss Confederacy in the 16th century. Members of the family were reeves in Riviera, Gaster, Blenio, Thurgau, and Landammann in March. This family was extinct in 1826.

Notable people with the surname include:

- Árpád Degen (1866–1934), Hungarian biologist and botanist
- Benjamin Degen, American painter, son of Bruce Degen
- Bob Degen (born 1944), American jazz pianist
- Bruce Degen (1945–2024), American illustrator and writer
- Carl Ferdinand Degen (1766–1825), Danish mathematician
- Celina Degen, Austrian footballer
- Chen Degen, Chinese skier
- Christoph Degen (born 1980), German politician
- David Degen (born 1983), Swiss footballer
- Dick Degen, American football player
- Frances Degen Horowitz, American developmental psychologist
- Hans Degen (1899–1971), German World War II general
- Helmut Degen, German composer
- Ion Degen (1925–2017), Soviet and Israeli writer and physician
- Jakob Degen (Jakob Schegk), German physician and philosopher
- Jürgen Degen (born 1967), German footballer
- Manfred Degen, German politician
- Michael Degen (1928–2022), German-Israeli actor, theatre director, and writer
- Minny Mock-Degen, Dutch anthropologist, writer, and publisher
- Paul Degen (1941–2007), Swiss artist
- Philipp Degen (born 1983), Swiss footballer
- Roger Degen, Australian politician
- Sandra J. F. Degen (born c. 1955), American biochemist and molecular geneticist
- Silvije Degen (born 1942), Croatian politician
- Søffren Degen, Danish classical guitarist and composer
