= Dever (disambiguation) =

Dever is a surname.

Dever may also refer to:

- Paul A. Dever State School, built as a military camp named Camp Myles Standish, located in Taunton, Massachusetts, USA
- Dever Orgill (born 1990), Jamaican footballer
- Huys Dever, small castle in Lisse, Netherlands
- River Dever, river in the English county of Hampshire
