= Deger =

Deger is a surname. Notable people with the surname include:

- Ernst Deger (1809–1885), German painter
- Steve Deger, American author

== See also ==
- Degner
- Dever
- Heger
