= HUD (video games) =

User interface element common in video games

The Nuclear Dawn HUD (largely in yellow) displays the character's health, weapon ammunition, and compass heading, while also including a map of the area in the top-right corner, and a circular marker pointing to the player's destination.

In video games, the HUD (heads-up display) is the method by which information is visually displayed to the player as part of a game's user interface. It takes its name from the head-up displays used in modern aircraft.

The HUD is frequently used to simultaneously display several pieces of information including the player character's health points, items, and an indication of game progression (such as score or level). A HUD may also include elements to aid a player's navigation in the virtual space, such as a mini-map.

== Common elements ==
While the information that is displayed on the HUD depends greatly on the game, there are many features that players recognize across many games. Most of them are static onscreen so that they stay visible during gameplay. Common features include:

- Health/lives – this might include the player's character and possibly other important characters, such as allies or bosses. Real-time strategy games usually show the health of every unit visible on screen. Also, in many (but not all) first- and third-person shooters, when the player is damaged, the screen (or part of it) flashes briefly (usually in red color, representing blood) and shows arrows or other similar images that point to the direction the threat came from, thus informing the player from which direction the enemies are attacking. In many fighting games, there are often two health bars on the top of the screen which often depletes to the middle (sometimes the opposite direction) with every punch or kick the player/enemy inflicts to their opponent.
- Time – this may be a timer counting down the time limit or the time left until a specific event. It may also be a timer counting up to records such as lap times in racing games, or the length of time a player can last in games based on survival. Many HUDs also use time displays to show the in-game time, such as the current time of day or year within the game. Some games may also display the real time.
- Weapons/ammunition – most action games (first- and third-person shooters in particular) show what weapon is being used, and also how much ammunition is in it. It can show other available weapons, and objects like health packs, radios, etc.
- Capabilities – gameplay options that are often accessible by the player during gameplay, such as available weapons, items, or spells. This can include when the ability will become usable again, such as ammunition, magic points, or some other type of "charge up" timer. Icons and/or text may appear in the HUD to indicate other actions that are only available at certain times or in certain places, to show they are available to perform and which button performs it; for example the text "A – open door" may be displayed, but only when the character is near a door.
- Menus – menus to exit, change options, delete files, change settings, etc.
- Game progression – the player's current score, money, lap, or level (as in stage or as in experience points). This might also include the character's current task or quest.
- Mini-map – a small map of the area that can act like a radar, showing the terrain, allies and/or enemies, locations like safe houses and shops, streets, etc.
- Speedometer/tachometer – used in most games which feature user operated vehicles. It is usually shown only when driving one of these.
- Context-sensitive information – shown only as it becomes important, such as tutorial messages, special one-off abilities, and speech subtitles.
- Reticle/cursor/cross-hair – an indication of where the character is aiming or where the mouse pointer is. Pressing a key while pointing at an object or character with the cursor can issue actions like shooting, talking, picking up objects, manipulating switches, using computers, etc.
- Stealth Meter – displays the awareness level of enemies to the player's presence (used mainly in stealth games and some first-person shooters).
- Compass/quest arrow - sometimes found in RPGs, first-person shooters and driving games, they help guide the player toward the objective. An example is in the first-person shooter BioShock, which displays an arrow pointing the direction of the next objective on the top of the player's HUD. Sometimes the compass itself might not be a real compass, rather one that points toward the next location or goal. Another notable example is in the open-world driving game Crazy Taxi.

There are also trends common among genres and platforms. Many online games show player names and a chat text box for talking to the other players. RTS games tend to have complex user interfaces, with context-sensitive panels and a full-overview mini-map with fog of war.

== Types and presentation of HUD elements ==
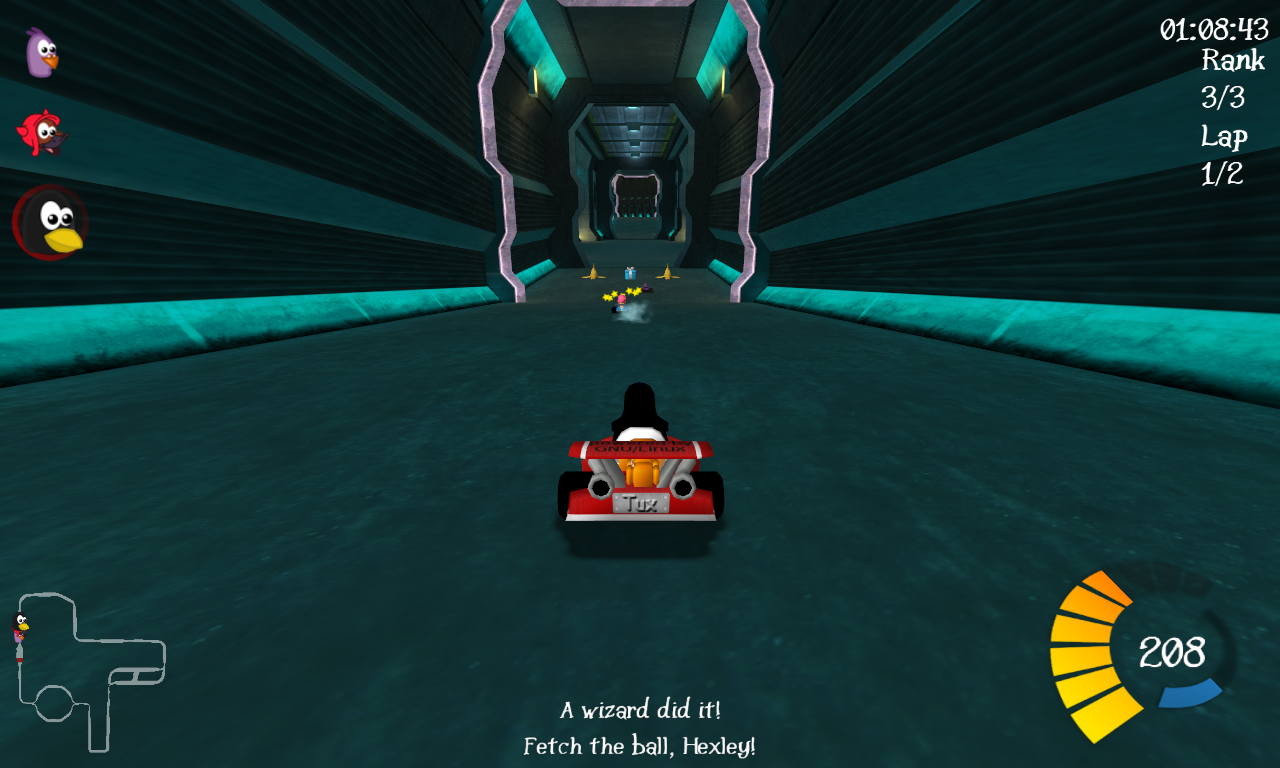
The SuperTuxKart HUD displays speed as both a number and a filled speedometer bar.

Most types of information can be represented in a variety of ways. A character's health, for instance, may be shown numerically, such as a percentage ranging from 0 to 100, where 100 indicates full health and 0 signifies death. A common alternative is the health bar, which visually depletes as the character takes damage. This method is frequently used in fighting games like Tekken or Street Fighter. Another traditional representation is the use of hearts, as seen in The Legend of Zelda, where each injury causes the player to lose a heart. In some titles, such as Gears of War, health is not constantly visible but instead appears contextually. When the player is injured, a red cog icon emerges on the screen; the more prominent the icon, the greater the damage sustained.

HUDs in games are most commonly static and non-diegetic, meaning the interface is always visible and does not exist within the game world itself. An alternative approach is the dynamic HUD, which only displays relevant information depending on the gameplay context. This reduces on-screen clutter and distractions, which can in turn enhance narrative and spatial immersion. One example is Red Dead Redemption 2, where, while exploring on horseback, the HUD may only show the mini-map and the horse’s stamina meter when galloping. When the player enters combat, the game will display information related to ammunition along with the meters for player health, player stamina, "Dead Eye" ability, horse stamina and horse health.

A diegetic HUD integrates information directly into the game world, helping maintain the player’s suspension of disbelief. For example, in Dead Space, the protagonist's health is displayed along the spine of his suit, making it constantly visible to the player due to the third-person perspective. Some games also use visual cues such as wounds, limping, heavy breathing, or bloodstains to indicate injury, a notable example being Resident Evil 2.

Certain games offer customizable HUDs, allowing players to tailor the interface to their preferences. World of Warcraft is notable for supporting extensive modification through Lua scripting. Similarly, Horizon Zero Dawn enables players to set the display of each element to always appear, show only when relevant, or never display.

In rare cases, games omit the HUD entirely, relying on environmental and auditory cues to convey information. Ico, for instance, features no HUD, complementing its calmer style by avoiding many traditional game-like elements.

=== Displaying the HUD on a second screen ===
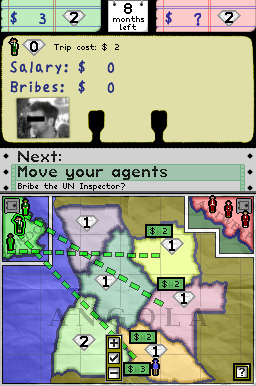
Games on the Nintendo DS such as Diamond Trust of London typically display gameplay on one screen and information on the other.

Some console video games are able to display an HUD on video game controllers that contain a smaller second screen that accompanies the gameplay on the main display. The Dreamcast, released in 1998, uses a VMU on many games as a HUD. A notable example is Resident Evil 2, Resident Evil 3: Nemesis and Resident Evil – Code: Veronica all using the VMU to show a mini version of the HUD, which displays the protagonists health and ammo. This feature returned with the introduction of the Nintendo Wii U, which uses the Wii U GamePad for some games as a HUD including Mario Kart 8 and Super Smash Bros. for Wii U.

Multi-screen gaming systems, particularly the Nintendo DS and Nintendo 3DS handheld systems, can also assign HUD information to one screen while showing gameplay in another.

Some video games utilize companion apps to display HUD information on a smartphone or tablet. Notable examples include Red Dead Redemption 2 and The Legend of Zelda: Tears of the Kingdom/Breath of the Wild.

== Potential screen damage ==
Prolonged display (that stays on the screen in a fixed position, remaining static) of HUD elements on certain CRT-based screens may cause permanent damage in the form of burning into the inner coating of the television sets. It is a risk for players who play games with HUD elements for extended periods of time. Plasma TV screens are also at risk, although the effects are usually not as permanent.

== See also ==
- Menu (computing)
- Second screen
