= Degen =

Degen may refer to:

== Weaponry ==
- Swiss degen, a type of short sword of the late medieval and Renaissance period
- the German term for a dress sword
  - Degen (SS), a type of straight saber used by the German SS
  - the German term for the épée in modern sport fencing

== Places ==
- Degen, Switzerland, a former municipality in Surselva, Graubünden, Switzerland
- Dêgên, a township in Nagqu prefecture, Tibet
- Henry Degen House, Missouri, United States

== Other uses ==
- Degen (surname)
- Dejen Gebremeskel (born 1989), Ethiopian long-distance runner
- Slang for degenerate

== See also ==
- Degn (name)
