= Devar (disambiguation) =

Devar is a 1966 Hindi film.

Devar may also refer to:

- An alternative transliteration of the Hebrew word דָּבָר, lit. Speech, Word, e.g., for Davar
- Sharmila Devar, American actress

== See also ==
- Dewar (disambiguation)
- Dever (disambiguation)
