= Degener =

Degener is a German surname. Notable people with the surname include:

- Edward Degener (1809–1890), German-American politician
- Gülşen Degener (born 1968), Turkish-born German carom billiards player
- Jeannette Schmidt Degener (1926–2017), Nigerien politician
- Isa Degener (1924–2018), German-American botanist and conservationist
- Joachim Degener (1883–1953), German general
- Johannes Degener (1889–1959), German politician
- Otto Degener (1899–1988), American botanist and conservationist
- Richard Degener (1912–1995), American diver
- Theresia Degener (born 1961), German jurist and professor of law

== See also ==
- Degen (surname)
- Degner
