= Personal medicine =

Personal medicine is an activity that a person does to obtain wellness, rather than something a person takes (e.g., medication) for wellness.

In the psychiatric setting, Personal Medicine, or other self-initiated, non-pharmaceutical self-care activities, is used to decrease symptoms, avoid undesirable outcomes such as hospitalization, and improve mood, thoughts, behaviors, and the overall sense of well-being. The phrase "Personal Medicine" has also been used by the popular press to refer to personalized medicine.

== Psychiatric care ==
The self-care use of "Personal Medicine" was first introduced in early 2003 as a result of qualitative research conducted by Patricia E. Deegan through the University of Kansas School of Social Welfare. After interviewing individuals who were taking psychiatric medication as a part of their recovery process, Deegan found that:

When describing their use of psychiatric pharmaceuticals or "pill medicine", research participants also described a variety of personal wellness strategies and activities that I have called "Personal Medicine". Personal Medicines were non-pharmaceutical activities and strategies that served to decrease symptoms and increase personal wellness.

=== Interference ===
Interferences or conflicts between a person's Personal Medicine and their prescribed medications may result in non-adherence and/or a diminished quality of life. Personal Medicine can be integrated with shared decision making within the psychopharmacology consultation to improve adherence. Research by Deegan and Robert E. Drake observed that:

When medications support or enable people to more effectively pursue activities such as employment, parenting, and returning to school, they are perceived by clients as a valued tool in the recovery process. However, if medications interfere with Personal Medicine, such that clients cannot engage in valued social roles and activities, the medications are viewed as blocking the recovery process and are often rejected. Insistence on compliance in such situations is experienced as counter-therapeutic and unhelpful. On the other hand, shared decision making allows the practitioner to work as an expert collaborator, actively helping the client to identify personal medicines and to optimize regimens and dosages of specific medications to support and complement the recovery of valued social roles.

=== Software ===
In 2006, Deegan expanded the concept of Personal Medicine into a software program called CommonGround for use in mental health clinics. Users of CommonGround are encouraged to develop their own unique Personal Medicines and are reminded of these personal medicines with subsequent use. The software also includes three-minute video vignettes of people talking about their recovery from mental illness and how they achieved it, i.e., gaining wellness via personal medicine.

== See also ==
- Personal genomics
- Self-care
