= Sandra J. F. Degen =

American biochemist (born c. 1955)

Sandra J.F. Degen
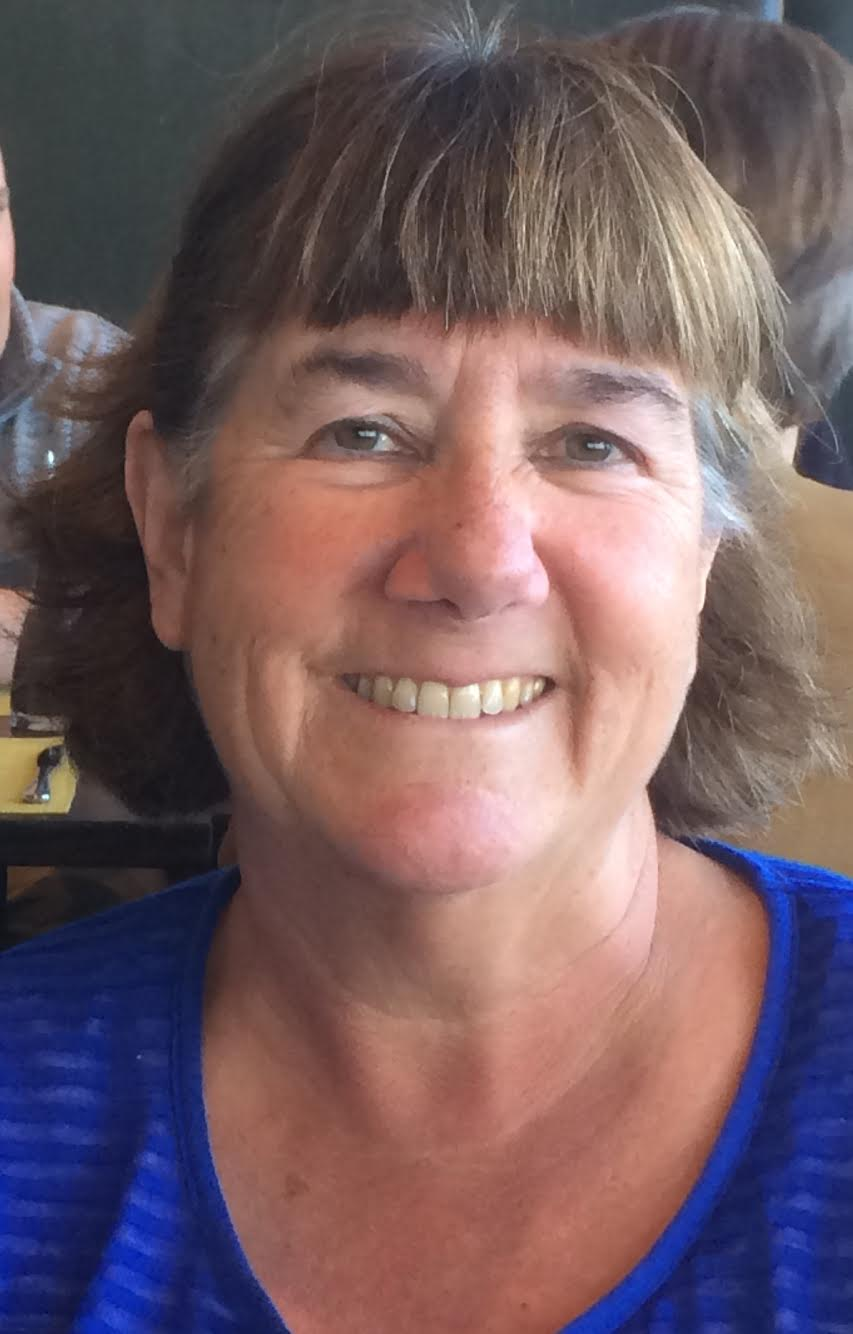
- Born: c. 1955 (age 70–71); Glendale, California
- Education: University of California, San Diego; University of Washington; Friedrich Miescher Institute
- Known for: Characterizing prothrombin cDNA, discovery of hepatocyte growth factor-like protein
- Awards: Pew Scholar in the Biomedical Sciences, University of Cincinnati Faculty Achievement Award, Special Recognition in Thrombosis, WE Celebrate Award Finalist and Runner-up for Women of the Year 2014
- Scientific career
- Fields: Biochemistry, molecular genetics
- Workplaces: Cincinnati Children's Hospital Medical Center at the University of Cincinnati

Sandra J. F. Degen (born c. 1955) is an American biochemist, molecular geneticist and professor emerita at the University of Cincinnati Children's Hospital Medical Center in the department of pediatrics. Degen was a professor at the University of Cincinnati for over thirty years, where she led a research program focused on probing the biology underlying blood coagulation, growth factors, and growth control. Her lab discovered a novel growth factor called hepatocyte growth factor-like protein. Degen is a member of several national societies and is an elected Fellow of the American Association for the Advancement of Science (AAAS).

== Early life and education ==
Degen was born in 1955 in Glendale, California. She grew up just outside of Los Angeles, in the San Fernando Valley of California. Her father was a scientist and her mother was a seamstress and she was one of four children. It was only once Degen started her undergraduate degree that she realized she wanted to pursue a career in science. First deciding to focus her studies in mathematics, Degen pursued her Bachelor of Arts at the University of California, San Diego. She switched her major to Chemistry after experiencing a challenging chemistry class and was excited to learn more. In her final year at UCSD, she worked in the laboratory of Russell F. Doolittle studying fibrinogen, a blood clotting factor. She became an author on several papers through her undergraduate work, specifically characterizing the amino acid sequences of the alpha chain of fibrinogen. She graduated in 1976 with a degree in chemistry.

Following her undergraduate degree, Degen pursued a Ph.D. in biochemistry at the University of Washington in Seattle, Washington. She worked in Earl Davie's lab studying human prothrombin, another blood protein involved in coagulation. She completed her Ph.D. in 1982 and moved to Switzerland to complete her postdoctoral work at the Friedrich Miescher Institute in Basel, Switzerland. During her two-year postdoc, Degen worked under the mentorship of Edward Reich studying the plasminogen activator gene. Degen completed her postdoctoral training in 1985.

== Career and research ==
In 1985, Degen was recruited to the University of Cincinnati in Cincinnati, Ohio where she became an assistant professor of pediatrics at the Children's Hospital Medical Center. In 1992 she was promoted to associate professor with tenure and finally received her full professorship in 1997. In 2004, Degen was appointed the acting vice president for research at the University of Cincinnati. Degen also held appointments as the associate chair of academic affairs for the department of pediatrics, and was the chair of the department of pediatrics' reappointment, promotion, and tenure committee. She held her full professorship until 2015, at which point she became a professor emerita for the University of Cincinnati.

While at Cincinnati, Degen was the principal investigator of a lab studying the regulation and biology of the blood coagulation protein, prothrombin. Her lab discovered a novel growth factor called hepatocyte growth factor-like protein and they extensively studied the functions of this growth factor as well as its tyrosine kinase receptor, Ron. During her tenure at Cincinnati, Degen and her lab filed three patents for their growth factory discoveries and their use in treating hepatic disorders.

Beyond her research, Degen has actively contributed to bettering the academic environment for women and promoting gender equity in science. She help start the Women Scholars Program and Young Women Scholars Program at the University of Cincinnati Children's Hospital which served to support the career development of women across career stages. Degen also showed her commitment to inspiring the next generation of young scientists by supporting development programs for high schoolers and conducting annual science career days. For her work, she was named Woman of the Year Runner-Up by the Cincinnati Youth Collaborative in 2014.

=== Characterization of prothrombin cDNA ===
During her graduate studies, Degen and her colleagues were the first to isolate and characterize complementary DNA (cDNA) coding for both bovine and human prothrombin. Prothrombin is a coagulation factor critical in the initial steps of blood clotting. They prepared the human prothrombin from human liver mRNA. Prior to their characterization, only the amino acid sequences had been reported, so they compared their cDNA sequences to the previously reported amino acid sequences and found several differences in the predicted amino acid structure from their cDNA. Several years later, after isolating cDNA for prothrombin from mice, they were able to characterize the complete prothrombin cDNA and from this predict the complete amino acid sequence of the prothrombin protein in mice. They subsequently mapped the gene to the mouse chromosome 2.

=== Characterization of human tissue plasminogen activator gene ===
During her postdoctoral work, Degen led a team to characterize the human tissue plasminogen activator (t-PA) gene. Human t-PA is a protein implicated in the breakdown of blood clots and is expressed in many tissues as well as by tumors. Degen's characterization of the complete nucleotide sequence was prompted by the desire to study the complex genetic regulation of t-PA expression and the implications this has in tumor growth. Their analysis highlighted several reading frames of the gene which prompted further investigation of the various gene products possible.

=== Characterization of hepatocyte growth factor-like protein ===
Early into her career at the University of Cincinnati, Degen led a team towards the discovery of a novel kringle-containing protein in mice which they called hepatocyte growth factor-like (HGFL) protein. They sequenced, for the first time, the gene and complementary DNA and found that it shared the same structural domains as hepatocyte growth factor, hence their name choice. They found that the gene expression was restricted to the liver via in situ hybridization analysis and thus despite the similarities to hepatocyte growth factor, its expression profile in primarily hepatocytes allowed Degen to conclude that it was in fact a novel protein.

Following this discovery, Degen and her team characterized the functional domains of the protein to understand its biological importance. Since HGFL had been found to play a role in stimulating mouse resident peritoneal macrophages and inducing cellular proliferation, motility, and apoptosis, Degen and her team sought to probe the function of the specific domains of the protein. They caused site-directed and deletion mutations in cDNA that coded for the protein and found that the heavy chain may play an important role in its function while the light chain may play a role in binding to its receptor, Ron. They later disrupted the HGFL gene in mice rendering loss of the HGFL protein to probe its impact on cellular and system function. They found that, though loss of HGFL delayed macrophage activation, it was not essential for embryogenesis, fertility, nor wound healing. When Degen and her team next probed the importance of the HGFL receptor, Ron, in biological functions, they found that ablation of the tyrosine kinase domain of Ron caused altered ability to regulate nitric oxide as well as enhanced tissue damage following cell-mediated inflammation. Next, they probed the effects of Ron tyrosine kinase domain deletion on mouse reproduction and found that it led to decreases in ovulation of oocyte complexes as well as increased levels of induced nitric oxide synthase (iNOS) before and after ovulation. They concluded that the increase in iNOS which leads to an increase in nitric oxide is likely the cause of the decreased ovulation rates.

== Awards and honors ==
- 1987-1991 Pew Scholar in the Biomedical Sciences
- 1978 Elected membership in the American Chemical Society
- 1989 Elected membership in American Society for Biochemistry and Molecular Biology
- 1997 University of Cincinnati Faculty Achievement Award
- 2001 Leading Women of Cincinnati Award for Technology/Science/Research
- 2004 Nominee for Outstanding Woman at Cincinnati Children's Hospital
- 2004 - 2005 Howard Hughes Medical Institute/Burroughs Welcome Foundation Partners in Scientific Management Program
- 2005 Founders Award, Women's Faculty Association, Cincinnati Children's Hospital
- 2005 Recognition Award in Thrombosis, American Heart Association, National Center, Council on Arteriosclerosis, Thrombosis and Vascular Biology
- 2011 Elected American Association for the Advancement of Science (AAAS) Fellow
- 2011 Elected to National Institutes of Health working Group for Future Biomedical Research Workforce
- 2012 Elected, Charter Fellow of the National Academy of Inventors
- 2012 Mentoring Achievement Award, Cincinnati Children's Hospital Medical Center
- 2014 WE Celebrate Award Finalist and Runner-up for Women of the Year (Corporate category), Cincinnati USA Regional Chamber

== Select publications ==
- Mullins ES, Kombrinck KW, Talmage KE, Shaw MA, Witte DP, Ullman JM, Degen SJ, Sun W, Flick MJ, Degen JL. Genetic elimination of prothrombin in adult mice is not compatible with survival and results in spontaneous hemorrhagic events in both heart and brain Blood. 113: 696–704. DOI: 10.1182/blood-2008-07-169003
- Sun WY, Coleman MJ, Witte DP, Degen SJ. Rescue of prothrombin-deficiency by transgene expression in mice. Thrombosis and Haemostasis. 88: 984–91. PMID 12529749 DOI: 10.1267/th02120984
- Waltz SE, Eaton L, Toney-Earley K, Hess KA, Peace BE, Ihlendorf JR, Wang MH, Kaestner KH, Degen SJ. Ron-mediated cytoplasmic signaling is dispensable for viability but is required to limit inflammatory responses. The Journal of Clinical Investigation. 108: 567–76. PMID 11518730 DOI: 10.1172/JCI11881
- Sun WY, Witte DP, Degen JL, Colbert MC, Burkart MC, Holmbäck K, Xiao Q, Bugge TH, Degen SJF. Prothrombin deficiency results in embryonic and neonatal lethality in mice Proceedings of the National Academy of Sciences of the United States of America. 95: 7597–7602. PMID 9636195 DOI: 10.1073/pnas.95.13.7597
- Bezerra JA, Carrick TL, Degen JL, Witte D, Degen SJF. Biological effects of targeted inactivation of hepatocyte growth factor- like protein in mice Journal of Clinical Investigation. 101: 1175–1183. PMID 9486989
- Waltz SE, McDowell SA, Muraoka RS, Air EL, Flick LM, Chen YQ, Wang MH, Degen SJ. Functional characterization of domains contained in hepatocyte growth factor-like protein. The Journal of Biological Chemistry. 272: 30526–37. PMID 9374547 DOI: 10.1074/jbc.272.48.30526
- Han S, Degen SJ. Genomic organization, chromosomal localization and developmental expression of hepatocyte growth factor-like protein. Exs. 65: 81–105. PMID 8422550
- Bezerra JA, Witte DP, Aronow BJ, Degen SJ. Hepatocyte-specific expression of the mouse hepatocyte growth factor-like protein. Hepatology. 18: 394–9. PMID 8340069
- Jamison CS, Degen SJ. Non-specific effects of aquaMEPHYTON (vitamin K1) on prothrombin expression in human hepatoblastoma (HepG2) cells. Thrombosis Research. 65: 409–19. PMID 1321512 DOI: 10.1016/0049-3848(92)90171-6
- Degen SJ, Schaefer LA, Jamison CS, Grant SG, Fitzgibbon JJ, Pai JA, Chapman VM, Elliott RW. Characterization of the cDNA coding for mouse prothrombin and localization of the gene on mouse chromosome 2. Dna and Cell Biology. 9: 487–98. PMID 2222810
- Degen SJ, Heckel JL, Reich E, Degen JL. The murine urokinase-type plasminogen activator gene. Biochemistry. 26: 8270–9. PMID 2831940
- Degen SJ, Rajput B, Reich E. The human tissue plasminogen activator gene. The Journal of Biological Chemistry. 261: 6972–85. PMID 3009482

== Personal ==
Degen is married to Jay L. Degen, who also held a professorship at the University of Cincinnati and studied hemoglobinopathies. The Degens have one daughter.
