= Immersive design =

Works with story-driven media

Immersive design (Experimental Design) describes design work which ranges in levels of interaction and leads users to be fully absorbed in an experience. This form of design involves the use of virtual reality (VR), augmented reality (AR), and mixed reality (MR) that create the illusion that the user is physically interacting with a realistic digital atmosphere.

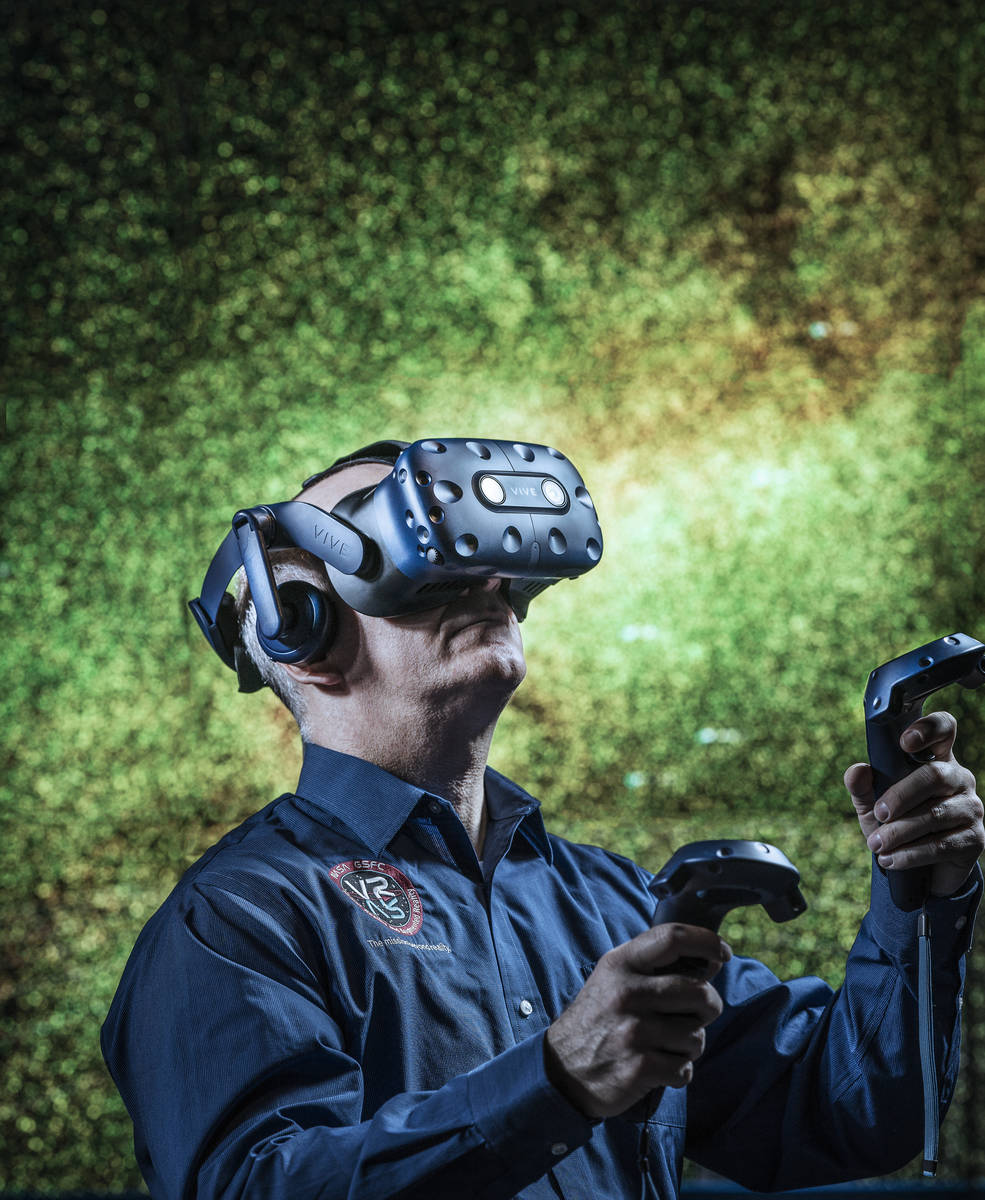
3D simulation that animated the speed and direction of four million stars in the Milky Way "Exploring the Universe in Virtual Reality" (2019) simulation by Goddard engineer Tom Grubb; image by NASA

== Overview ==
Alex McDowell coined the phrase 'immersive design' in 2007 in order to frame a discussion around a design discipline that addresses story-based media within the context of digital and virtual technologies. Together McDowell and museum director Chris Scoates co-directed 5D | The Future of Immersive Design conference in Long Beach 2008, laying some groundwork for immersive design to be a distinct design philosophy. 5D has become a forum and community representing a broad range of cross-media designers with its intent based in education, cross-pollination and the development of an expanding knowledge base.

In recent years, immersive design has been promoted as a design philosophy where it has been appropriated for the purposes of describing design for narrative media and the process of Worldbuilding.

With immersive design being applied to a variety of topics and discussions, there is great benefit to how immersive design can benefit the future of technology. Topics and discussions include, mental health and personal medicine, gaming, journalism, and education. Although immersive design is still maturing, it has served a great benefit to these fields, providing a unique learning experience for those involved.

== Characteristics ==
In order for an experience to be considered 'immersive', it needs to incorporate multiple characteristics that help generate the altered illusionary experience.

- Audio
- Sight
- Touch
- Multimedia
- Multi-format
- Projection Mapping
- LED

== See also ==
- Narrative
- Human-centered computing
- Immersion (virtual reality)
- Gesamtkunstwerk
