= Degn =

Degn is a surname and a given name.

== Surname ==
- Camilla Degn (born 1997), a Danish handball player and beach handball player
- Helle Degn (born 1946), a Danish politician
- Malene Degn (born 1986), a Danish cyclist
- Kasper Degn, a Danish professional ice hockey player
- Knud Degn (1880–1965), a Danish sailor
- Peter Degn, a Danish former professional footballer

== Given name ==
- Degn Brøndum, the proprietor of Brøndums Hotel in Skagen, Denmark

== See also ==
- DEGDN - diethylene glycol dinitrate, an explosive nitrated alcohol ester
- Degen (disambiguation)
- Degan (disambiguation)
