= Degner =

Degner is a surname. Notable people with the surname include:

- Betty Degner, American baseball player
- Ernst Degner (1931–1983), German motorcycle road racer

== See also ==
- Degener
- Deger
- Denner
