= Patricia Deegan =

American disability-rights advocate, psychologist and researcher

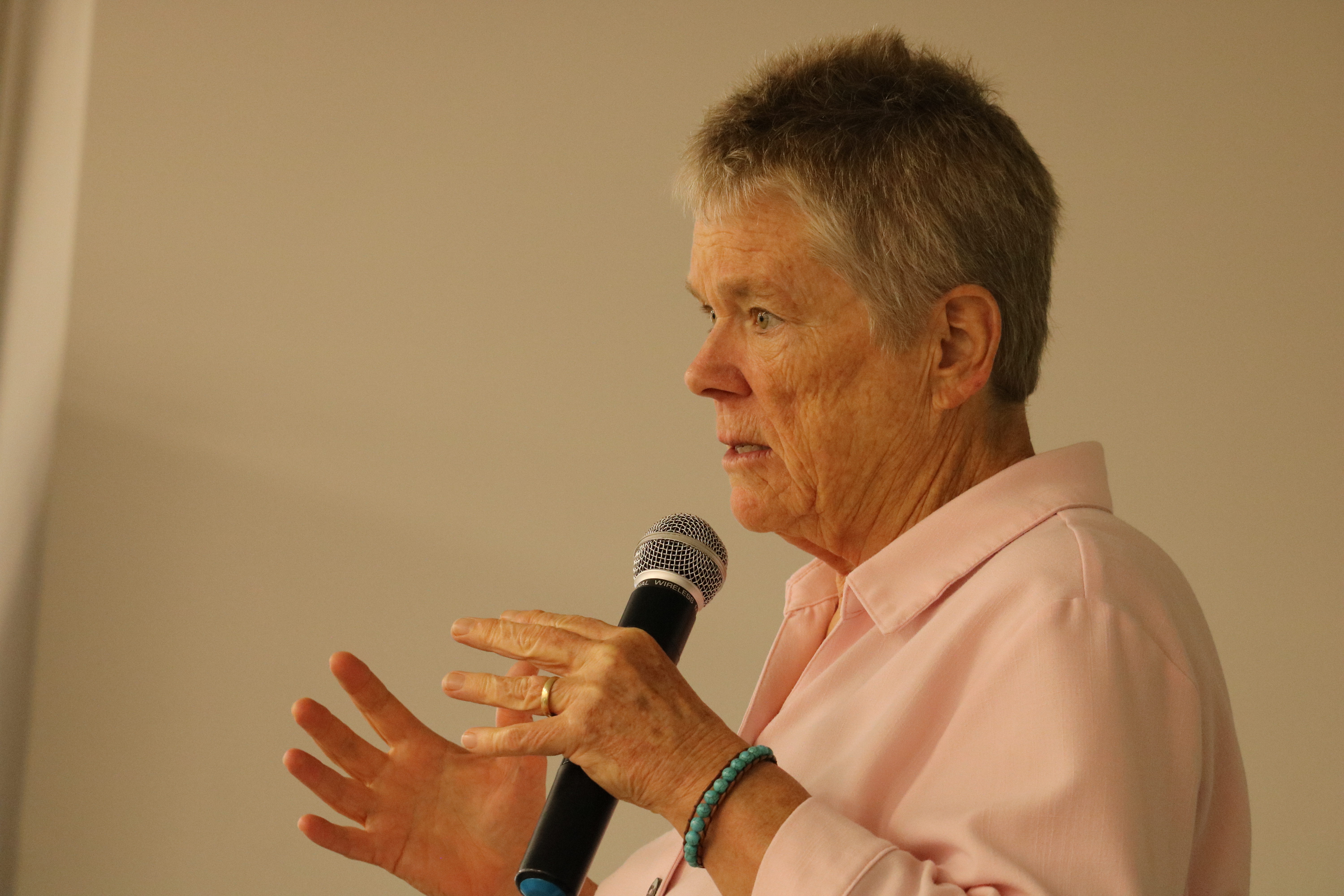
- Patricia Deegan, giving a workshop in Israel, 2019
- Education: Fitchburg State College (1977); Duquesne University (1984)
- Scientific career
- Fields: Psychology

Patricia E. Deegan is an American disability-rights advocate, psychologist and researcher. She has been described as a "national spokesperson for the mental health consumer/survivor movement in the United States." Deegan is known as an advocate of the mental health recovery movement (a cofounder of the National Empowerment Center) and is an international speaker and trainer in the field of mental health. (Note: Attributed to multiple sources:)

Deegan co-founded M-POWER (Massachusetts People/Patients Organized for Wellness, Empowerment and Rights) and created CommonGround, "a web application to support shared decision making in the psychopharmacology consultation."

== Personal life ==
Deegan was diagnosed with schizophrenia as a teenager. She credits her grandmother with putting her on the road to recovery. Together with her partner of 30 years, Deborah Anderson, they have raised a daughter, Chianne.

== Academia ==
Deegan received her B.S. from Fitchburg State College in 1977 and her PhD in clinical psychology from Duquesne University in 1984. Her dissertation titled "The use of diazepam in an effort to transform being anxious: An empirical phenomenological investigation" was conducted under the supervision of William F. Fischer. Deegan is a phenomenological psychologist, whose writings include rich autobiographical accounts of her experience living with schizophrenia, and emphasize that recovery from serious mental illness is possible.

She also served as an adjunct professor at the Dartmouth College Medical School, Department of Community and Family Medicine and the Boston University, Sargent College of Health and Rehabilitation Sciences.

== Honors and recognition ==
- 1983 Dissertation Fellowship from the American Association of University Women
- 1986 Excellence Award from the Massachusetts Alliance for the Mentally Ill
- 2001 The David E. Ray Award, Northeast Independent Living Program
- 2009 The Brendan Nugent Leadership Award, NYAPRS
- 2010 Agency for Healthcare Research and Quality recognition as a practice innovation
- 2010 Patient Empowerment by the Ashoka Changemakers Foundation finalist in the international competition
- 2011 Clifford Beers Award, Mental Health America
- 2013 New York Association of Psychiatric Rehabilitation Services (NYAPRS) Lifetime Achievement Award
- 2013 Scattergood Foundation Innovation Award
- 2013 APA Gold Award in partnership with Community Care Behavioral Health
- 2015 Wayne Fenton Award for Exceptional Clinical Care
- 2017 International Association of Peer Supporters Steve Harrington Award
- 2018 New York Association of Psychiatric Rehabilitation Services Lifetime Achievement Award

== Research and professional interests ==
Electronic decision support and shared decision making. Specialist in qualitative research focusing on recovery from mental illness, the effectiveness of self-help and mutual-support, mental health systems change and research on ex-patient perspectives on the history of mental health services.

- 2013 – present Consultant
  - OnTrackNY: Coordinated Specialty Care Team for first episode psychosis: team development, materials development and consultation.
- 2014 – 2018 Co-Principal Investigator
  - PCORI: Amplifying the Patient's Voice: Person-Centered vs. Measurement-Based Approaches in Mental Health
- 2011 – 2015 Consultant
  - Bringing Recovery to Scale (BRSSTACS) SAMHSA Grant.
- 2009 – 2013 Consultant
  - Recovery After Initial Schizophrenia Episode (RAISE). NIMH funded national study of best practice for the treatment of first episode psychosis. Executive Committee and Intervention Committee.
- 2008 – 2011 Consultant
  - SAMHSA Shared Decision Making Project. Assist with development of decision aid for choice of antipsychotic medications.
- 2005-2007 Principal Investigator
  - Using medications as part of the recovery process: A peer-2-peer, videotaped workshop with supporting materials, New York State Office of Mental Health, Bureau of Recipient Affairs.
- 2002-2009 Principal Investigator
  - A recovery based approach to using psychiatric medications. University of Kansas, School of Social Welfare.
- 2002- 2005 Principal Investigato
  - Self-directed recovery from psychiatric disorders. New York State Office of Mental Health, Bureau of Recipient Affairs.
- 2002- 2004 Principal Investigator
  - Direct national effort to organize mental health consumers to combat stigma through state hospital cemetery restoration.
- 1999 - 2001 Principal Investigator, for a supplemental grant from the Center for Mental Health Services titled "It's About Time: Recovering, Discovering and Celebrating Consumer/Survivor History": To organize ex-patients in various states to restore state hospital cemeteries and to research the perspective of ex-patients including special profiles on African American, Hispanic and Native American perspectives.
- 1998 - 2000 Principal Investigator
  - Office of Consumer and Ex-patient Relations through a grant from the Massachusetts Department of Mental Health: To organize ex-patients in Massachusetts to restore cemeteries at state hospitals and to research the history of mental health services in Massachusetts from the perspective of ex-patients.
- 1996-1999 Co-Principal Investigator with D. Fisher.
  - Recovery Narratives and the recovery process funded by SAMSHA Center for Mental Health Services. Interviews and analysis of recovery narratives. The study identified principles and themes of the recovery process from serious mental disorders as part of a $1 million core grant to National Empowerment Center.
- 1994 Principal Investigator
  - Employee Performance Standard that Support Recovery and Empowerment for People with Major Psychiatric Disorders. Advocates, Inc. of Framingham MA. Developed a methodology to collect data and work with mental health supervisors to develop performance based standards. Recruited 5 national field sites to pilot the performance standards. On-going, web-based follow-up and refinement of method and outcomes.
- 1993-1996 Principal Investigator.
  - Interviewed 40 subjects on strategies for coping with auditory hallucinations, conducted analyses and published the findings. Funded by the Center for Mental Health Services/SAMHSA as part of another $1 million core grant to the National Empowerment Center Lawrence, MA.
- 1982 Principal Investigator
  - Empirical phenomenological study of failing to learn. Lab research at Duquesne University.

== Publications ==
- Deegan, P. E., Stiles, A., Rufo, M., & Zisman-Ilani, Y. (2024). Awakening on antipsychotic medication: A call to action.. Psychiatric Rehabilitation Journal. Advance online publication. https://dx.doi.org/10.1037/prj0000608
- Zisman-Ilani Y, Parker M, Thomas EC, Suarez J, Hurford I, Bowen A, Calkins M, Deegan PE, Nossel I, Dixon LB (2024). Usability and Feasibility of Antipsychotic Medication Decision Aid (APM-DA) in a First Episode Psychosis Community Program, Psychiatric Services, 75:8, 807–811.
- Fortuna, K. L., Lebby, S., Geiger, P., Johnson, D., MacDonald, S., Chefetz, I., Ferron, J. C., St George, L., Rossom, R., Kalisa, J., Mestrovic, T., Nicholson, J., Pringle, W., Rotondi, A. J., Sippel, L. M., Sica, A., Solesio, M. E., Wright, M., Zisman-Ilani, Y., Gambee, D., ... Walker, R. (2023). Lived Experience-Led Research Agenda to Address Early Death in People With a Diagnosis of a Serious Mental Illness: A Consensus Statement. JAMA network open, 6(5), e2315479. https://doi.org/10.1001/jamanetworkopen.2023.15479
- Deegan, PE (2022). I am a person, not an illness, Schizophrenia Research, 244, 74.
- MacDonald-Wilson, K. L., Williams, K., Nikolajski, C. E., McHugo, G., Kang., C., Deegan, P., Carpenter-Song, E., & Kogan, J. N. (2021). Promoting collaborative decision making in community mental health centers: Insights from a patient-centered comparative effectiveness trial. Psychiatric Rehabilitation Journal, 44(1), 11–21. https://doi.org/10.1037/prj0000455
- Deegan, PE (2020). Guarigione, riabilitazione e la Cospirazione della Speranza. In La Practica Quotidiana Della Speranza, Giuseppe Tibaldi (Ed.), Mimesis.
- Deegan, PE (2020). Prescribing hope for recovery. Psychiatric Times, 37:6, 12–13.
- Deegan, PE (2020). The journey to use medication optimally to support recovery. Psychiatric Services, 71:4, 401–402.
- Fortuna, KL, Naslund, JA, LaCroix, JM, Bianco, CL, Brooks, JM, Zisman-Ilani, Y, PhD, Muralidharan, A, Deegan, PE. (2020). Systematic Review of Peer-Supported Digital Mental Health Interventions for People with a Lived Experience of a Serious Mental Illness. JMIR: Mental Health, 7 (3): doi: 10:2196/16460.
- Deegan, PE (2019). The Owl and Me: Recovery Across My Lifespan (Die Eule und ich oder Recovery al sein lebenslanger prozess). In G Zuaboni, C Burr, A Winter, M Schulz (Eds), Recovery und psychische Gesundheit: Grundlagen und Praxisprojekte, Psychiatrie Verlag GmbH, Koln, 14–25.
- Fortuna, KL, Walker, R, Fisher, D, Mois, G, Allan, S, & Deegan, PE (2019). Enhancing Digital Mental Health Standards and Principles with Recovery-Focused Guidelines for Mobile, Online, and Remote Monitoring Technologies. Psychiatric Services, 70:12, 1080–1081.
- Fortuna, KL, Ferron, J, Pratt, SI, Muralidharan, A, Williams, AM, Aschbrenner, KA, Deegan, PE, & Salzer, M. (2019). Unmet needs of people with serious mental illness: Perspectives from certified peer specialists. Psychiatric Quarterly, 90(2).
- Yaara Zisman-Ilani, David Shern, Patricia Deegan, JulieKreyenbuhl, Lisa Dixon, Robert Drake, William Torrey, Manish Mishra, Ksenia Gorbenko, Glyn Elwyn (2018). Continue, adjust, or stop antipsychotic medication: developing and user testing an encounter decision aid for people with first-episode and long-term psychosis. BMC Psychiatry, 18:142, https://doi.org/10.1186/s12888-018-1707-x.
- Deegan, PE (2018). L’expérience vécue du rétablissement. In Nicolas Franck (Ed), Traité de rehabilitation psychosociale. Elsevier Masson, France, 9–15.
- Deegan PE, Carpenter-Song E, Drake RE, Naslund JA, Luciano A, Hutchison SL (2017). Enhancing Clients’ Communication Regarding Goals for Using Psychiatric Medications. Psychiatric Services, 68:8, 771–775.
- Kim L. MacDonald-Wilson, Shari L. Hutchison, Irina Karpov, Paul Wittman, Patricia E. Deegan (2016). A successful implementation strategy to support adoption of decision making in mental health services. Community Mental Health Journal, June 4.
- Drake RE, Noel VA, Deegan PE (2015). Measuring recovery as an outcome. Die Psychiatrie, 12 3: 174–179.
- Hutchison, S.L., Karpov, I., Deegan, P.E., MacDonald-Wilson, K.L., & Schuster, J.M. Adoption of strategies to improve decision support in community mental health centers. (2015). Implementation Science, 10(Suppl 1), A27, doi:10.1186/1748-5908-10-S1-A27
- Deegan PE (2014). Commentary: Shared decision making must be adopted, not adapted. Psychiatric Services, 65(12): 1487–1487.
- MacDonald-Willson KL, Deegan PE, Hutchison HL, Parrotta N, Schuster JM (2013). Integrating Self-Management Strategies into Mental Health Service Delivery: Empowering People in Recovery. Psychiatric Rehabilitation Journal, 36,4 258–263.
- Stein BD, Kogan JN, Mihalyo MJ, Schuster J, Deegan PE, Sobero MJ, Drake RE. (2012). Use of computerized medication shared decision-making tool in community mental health settings: Impact on psychotropic medication adherence. Community Mental Health Journal, July,1-8.
- Deegan, P.E. (2010). A description of a web application to support shared decision making. Psychiatric Rehabilitation Journal,34(1):23-8.
- Drake, R.E., Deegan P.E., & Rapp, C. (2010). The promise of shared decision making in mental health. Psychiatric Rehabilitation Journal, 34(1):7-13.
- Drake, R.E., Deegan, P.E., Woltmann, E., Haslett, W., Drake, T., & Rapp, C. (2010). Comprehensive electronic decision support systems. Psychiatric Services, 61:714-717.
- Drake, R.E. & Deegan, P.E. (2009). Shared decision making: Whose decision? (In Reply) Psychiatric Services, 60,1555-1556.
- Drake, R.E. & Deegan, P.E. (2009). Shared decision making is an ethical imperative: (Taking Issue). Psychiatric Services, 60, 1007.
- Wilson JEH, Azzopardi W, Sager S, Gould B, Conroy S, Deegan P, Archie S (2009). A narrative study of the experiences of students who have participated in the Hearing Voices that are Distressing simulation. Int J Nurs Educ Scholarsh, 6:19, 1–15.
- Deegan, P.E., Rapp, C., Holter, M. & Riefer, M. (2008). A program to support shared decision making in an outpatient psychiatric medication clinic. Psychiatric Services, 59, 603–605.
- Drake, R.E. & Deegan, P.E., (2008). Are assertive community treatment and recovery compatible? Commentary on "ACT and recovery: integrating evidence-based practice and recovery orientation on assertive community treatment teams". Community Ment Health Journal. Feb; 44(1):75-7.
- Deegan, P.E. (2007). The lived experience of using psychiatric medicine in the recovery process and a shared decision making program to support it. Psychiatric Rehabilitation Journal, 31,62-69.
- Deegan, P.E. & Drake, R.E. (2007). Shared decision-making: In reply. Psychiatric Services,58, 1, 140.
- Deegan, P.E. & Drake, R.E. (2006). Shared decision-making and medication management in the recovery process. Psychiatric Services, 57,11,1636-1639.
- Deegan, P.E. (2005). The importance of personal medicine: A qualitative study of resilience in people with psychiatric disabilities. Scandinavian Journal of Public Health, 33,29-35.
- Deegan, P.E. (2005). Recovery as a journey of the heart. In L. Davidson, C Harding & L Spaniol (Eds.), Recovery from severe mental illnesses: Research Evidence and Implications, Center for Psychiatric Rehabilitation, Boston University: Boston MA. p. 57-68.
- Deegan, P.E. (2004). Re-thinking rehabilitation: Freedom. Study of Current Rehabilitation, 121, 12, 5–10.
- Deegan, P.E. (2002). The Independent Living Movement and People With Psychiatric Disabilities: Taking Back Control Over Our Own Lives. In J. van Weeghel (Ed.), Community Care and Psychiatric Rehabilitation for Persons With Severe Mental Illness. Geneva Initiative on Psychiatry: Hilversum (The Netherlands), 115–124.
- Deegan, P.E. (2001). Recovery as a self-directed process of healing and transformation. In C. Brown (Ed.) Recovery and wellness: Models of hope and empowerment for people with mental illness, Haworth Press: New York, p. 5-21.
- Deegan, P.E. (2001). Insane sisters. [Review of the book Insane sisters: Or the price paid for challenging a company town]. Psychiatric Services, 52, 12,1661.
- Deegan, P.E. (2001). Att bruka mediciner i sin återhämtning. Stockholm:RSMH, SPO;Södra.
- Deegan, P.E. (2001). Recovery as a Self-Directed Process of Healing and Transformation. Occupational Therapy in Mental Health: A Journal of Psychosocial Practice & Research, 17, 5-21.
- Deegan, P.E. (2000). "Havordan vine tilbake egenverdet etter a ha fatt en diagnose?" Dialog, 2–3, p. 96-103.
- Deegan, P.E. (1999). Human Sexuality and Mental Illness: Recovery Principles and Consumer Viewpoints. Sexuality and serious mental illness, (P.F. Buckley Ed.). Harwood Academic Publishers, 21 – 33.
- Fisher, D. & Deegan, P.E. (1999). Final report of research on recovery from mental illness. Lawrence, MA: National Empowerment Center and the Center for Mental Health Services.
- Deegan, P.E. (1998). "The evolution of my work as a psychologist." The Journal of the California Alliance for the Mentally Ill. 9:1, p. 19-21.
- Deegan, P.E. (1997). "Recovery and empowerment for people with psychiatric disabilities". In U. Aviram (Ed.), Social Work In Mental Health: Issues and Trends. The Haworth Press, NY, p. 11-24.
- Deegan, P.E. (1997). "Recovery and empowerment for people with psychiatric disabilities". Social Work in Health Care, 25,3, p. 11-24.
- Deegan, P.E. (1997). (1)Recovery as a Journey of the Heart. (2) Recovery the Lived Experience of Rehabilitation. (3) Spirit Breaking: When the Helping Professions hurt. (4)The Independent Living Movement and People with Psychiatric Disabilities : Taking control back over our own lives. In L. Spaniol, C. Gagne & M. Koehler (Eds.), Psychological and Social Aspects of Psychiatric Disability. Center for Psychiatric Rehabilitation, Boston University, Boston, MA 02215.
- Deegan, P.E. (1996). A letter to my friend who is giving up. The Journal of the California Alliance for the Mentally Ill, Vol. 5, No. 3.
- Deegan, P.E. (1996). Consumer-Provider Perspective: Blending two realities into a unique perspective. Journal of Psychosocial Nursing, 34 (9) 39–46.
- Deegan, P.E. (1996). Recovery as a Journey of the Heart. Psychiatric Rehabilitation Journal 19, 3, p. 91 - 97.
- Deegan, P.E. (1996). The sea rose: Recovering from mental illness. There's a Person in Here: Contemporary themes in mental health services, The Mental Health Services Conference Inc. of Australia and New Zealand: Ian Liddell Pty Limited, p. xvi - xxiv.
- Deegan, P.E. (1995). Before We Dare to Vision We Must Be Able to See. In M.Pritchard (Ed), Dare to Vision : Shaping the national agenda for women, abuse and mental health services (p. 6-15). Human Resource Association of the Northeast Publication, Holyoke, Massachusetts 01040.
- Deegan, P.E. (1994). Recovery: The lived experience of rehabilitation. In L. Spaniol & M. Koehler (Eds.), The Experience of Recovery, (pp. 54 –59). Boston University, Center for Psychiatric Rehabilitation.
- Deegan, P.E. (1994). The Independent Living Movement and people with psychiatric disabilities : Taking control back over our own lives. In L. Spaniol et al. (Eds.) An Introduction to Psychiatric Rehabilitation (p. 121 - 134). International Association of Psychosocial Rehabilitation Services/ Boston University Center for Psychiatric Rehabilitation.
- Deegan, P.E. (1994). Recovery: The lived experience of rehabilitation (p. 149-161). In W. Anthony & L. Spaniol (Eds). Readings in Psychiatric Rehabilitation. Boston University Center for Psychiatric Rehabilitation.
- Deegan, P.E. (1993). Recovering our sense of value after being labeled mentally ill. Journal of Psychosocial Nursing and Mental Health Services . 31,4, p. 7-11.
- Deegan P.E. & Shaw, J. (1993). A Technical Assistance Guide to Planning a Barrier-Free, Consumer-Run and Consumer-Controlled conference. Available through the National Empowerment Center, 20 Ballard Road, Lawrence, MA, USA 01843.
- Deegan, P.E. (1992). The Independent Living Movement and people with psychiatric disabilities: Taking control back over our own lives. Psychosocial Rehabilitation Journal, 15, p. 3 - 19.
- Deegan, P.E. (1991). Recovery: The lived experience of rehabilitation. In R.P. Marinelli and A. E. Dell Orto (Eds.), The Psychological & Social Impact of Disability (p. 47 - 54).New York, Springer.
- Deegan, P.E. (1990). Spirit Breaking: When the helping professions hurt. The Humanistic Psychologist, 18,3,301-313.
- Deegan, P.E. (1988). Recovery: The lived experience of rehabilitation. Psychosocial Rehabilitation Journal, 9,4, 11 - 19.
- Deegan, P.E. (1984). An empirical phenomenological investigation of the use of diazepam in an effort to transform being anxious. Dissertation, Duquesne University/Pittsburgh, PA.
- Deegan, P.E. (1983). I promised you a rose garden but I'm taking it back: Reflection on the therapeutic relationship. Duquesne Universal Student Manuscripts, Vol. II, Pittsburgh : Duquesne University Press.
- Deegan, P.E. (1982). An empirical phenomenological investigation of failing to learn. Journal of Phenomenological Psychology, Spring.

== Films ==
- 2003 – Inside Outside: Building a meaningful life after the hospital – co-creator and producer.
- 2003 – From Numbers to Names: State hospital cemetery restoration – co-producer.
- 2001 - The Politics of Memory: Ex-patient Perspectives on the History of Mental Health Services. Researched, photographed, wrote and produced this film.

== Sample of media interviews ==
- 1997 This American Life - Guided by voices https://www.thisamericanlife.org/52/edge-of-sanity/act-two-0
- 1999 State Hospital Cemetery Restoration: From Numbers to Names https://www.youtube.com/watch?v=A1bgJX93_II
- 2009 Frese, Frederick J.; Knight, Edward L.; Saks, Elyn (March 2009). "Recovery From Schizophrenia: With Views of Psychiatrists, Psychologists, and Others Diagnosed With This Disorder". Schizophrenia Bulletin. 35 (2): 370–380. doi:10.1093/schbul/sbn175. PMC 2659312. PMID 19304812.
- 2010 Ashoka Foundation Finalist Patients-Choices-Empowerment https://www.changemakers.com/empower-patient/entries/commonground-shared-decision-making?breadcrumb_type=finalists
- 2012 Two part piece in Forbes Magazine titled Success, Social Value and Personal Mission https://www.forbes.com/sites/greggfairbrothers/2012/10/03/success-social-value-and-personal-mission-part-one/#5904f4f64fb1; https://www.forbes.com/sites/greggfairbrothers/2012/10/15/success-social-value-and-personal-mission-part-2/#49cadaec1bee
- 2013 Scattergood Foundation Innovation Award http://www.scattergoodfoundation.org/2013-award
- 2013 Psychiatric Services Gold Achievement Award https://ps.psychiatryonline.org/doi/abs/10.1176/appi.ps.641112
- 2014 Anderson Cooper 360 Tries Voices Simulation https://www.youtube.com/watch?v=yL9UJVtgPZY
- 2015 Wayne Fenton Award https://academic.oup.com/schizophreniabulletin/article/41/5/999/1921402
- 2016 "Mental Health Software Treats Patients As Partners" http://www.vnews.com/News/Health-Care/Dartmouth-Professor-Living-with-Mental-Illness-Developed-West-Central-s-New-Care-Tool-1349136
- 2017 Psychiatric News Alert: Power Approach Gives Patients Stronger Voice in Their Treatment http://alert.psychnews.org/2017/04/power-approach-gives-patients-stronger.html
- 2017 Adversity to Advocacy KCBS Radio http://a2aalliance.org/sl/2924/
- 2017 CPI 10th Anniversary talk: Putting the Human Back in the Human Serviceshttps://www.patdeegan.com/blog/posts/putting-human-back-human-services
- 2018 - 115 First Year Medical Students Go Through Pat's Voices Simulation http://www.pahomepage.com/news/students-hear-voices-to-gain-perspective/944099270>
- 2021 – The Me You Can't See (docuseries Apple TV+) with Oprah Winfrey and Prince Harry.

== Sample of major Lectures ==
- Invited General Session: American Psychiatric Association Annual Meeting. The Journey to Use Medication Optimally to Support Recovery. May 2021.
- Keynote Address: 10th Annual Meeting of the Israel Psychiatric Rehabilitation Association. The Power of Personal Medicine in Recovery. Tel Aviv, Israel December 9, 2019.
- Keynote: The New York Association of Psychiatric Rehabilitation Services. Dignity: How Do You Roar? Ellensville, New York, September 12, 2018.
- Invited Plenary: 126th Annual Convention of the American Psychological Association. I Am Not A Schizophrenic. San Francisco, CA: August 10, 2018.
- Keynote: Fourth International Psychiatric Congress on Mental Health and Recovery. The Owl and Me: Recovery Across the Lifespan. Bern, Switzerland: June 28, 2018.
- Address: Harvard University, William James Hall, Cambridge MA. Personal Medicine, Power Statements and Other Disruptive Innovations. Friday Morning Seminar, Culture, Psychiatry and Global Mental Health. November 17, 2017.
- Keynote: International Association of Peer Supporters, Phoenix Arizona. Peer Supporters: At the intersection of love and outrage. October 2017.
- Keynote: Department of Behavioral Health, Georgia. Recovery Leadership. October 2017.
- Keynote: St. Ambrose University, Mind and Body Conference, NAMI of Greater Mississippi Valley. Recovery, A Conspiracy of Hope. Davenport, IA, May 2016.
- Address: Stanford University, Medicine X. Personal Medicine, Power Statements and Other Disruptive Innovations. Palo Alto, CA, September 2015.
- Keynote Address: Recovery: A Conspiracy of Hope. Hogg Foundation For Mental Health. Austin, TX, September 8, 2014.
- Plenary Address: Shared Decision Making and Assistive Technology. National Alliance on Mental Illness Convention, Washington DC, September 5, 2014.
- Keynote Address: The Dignity of Risk and the Duty to Care. The Ira S. Stevens 34th Memorial Conference, Mental Health Association of Westchester, New York.
- Keynote Address: Peer staff in the workforce: Disruptive innovators. Madison Wisconsin, IPS: Moving Forward By Design, June 4–5, 2013.
- Keynote Address: Whole Health Recovery. Public Psychiatric Conference, Pittsburgh, PA June 2012.
- Keynote Address: A Conspiracy of Hope: How to support the recovery of people with psychiatric disabilities. Psychiatric Treatment Services, Copenhagen, Denmark May 14, 2012.
- Keynote Address: Peer Staff as Disruptive Innovators. 5th Annual Conference for Working Peers, New York City, NY, June 2011.
- Keynote Address: Personal Medicine, Power Statements and other disruptive innovations. USPRA (United States Psychiatric Rehabilitation Association), National Conference, Boston, MA, June 2011.
- Thought Leader Address: The promise of electronic decision support in behavioral health. National Council for Community Behavioral Healthcare, national conference, San Antonio, TX, April 2009.
- Keynote Address: A tree in winter: reflections on recovery oriented practice. Statewide evidence based practice conference, Chicago, Illinois, May 11, 2009.
- Thought Leader Plenary: Innovations in computer assisted decision support in psychiatry. National Council for Behavioral Health, San Antonio, TX, April 4, 2009.
- Plenary Addresses: Silence: What we don’t talk about in rehabilitation and Consumer/Survivor/Ex-patient Resistance, Resilience and Recovery. SKUR, Bodo, Norway, June 14, 2005.
- Plenary Address: Recovery. Canadian Mental Health Association, Thunder Bay Ontario, May 12, 2005.
- Plenary Address: Inside Outside: Building a Meaningful Life After the Hospital. National Summit of State Hospital Superintendents, Washington, D.C., May 1, 2005.
- Plenary Address: Inside Outside: Building a Meaningful Life After the Hospital. National Association of State Mental Health Program Directors Winter 2004 Meeting. Washington, D.C., December 5, 2004.
- Plenary Addresses: Recovery: The Experience, the Evidence and the Practice. Psykiatrin Sodra and RSMH. Stockholm Sweden, Gothenburg Sweden, Copenhagen Denmark, October 5,6,7,8,9, 2004.
- Plenary Panel: Self-Directed Care for People With Psychiatric Disabilities. 4th Annual Olmstead Conference: Achieving the Promise of Transformation. Substance Abuse and Mental Health Services Administration, Georgetown University, Washington, DC, September 12, 2004.
- Plenary Address: Inside Outside: Building a Meaningful Life After the Hospital. National Association of Consumer/Survivor Mental Health Administrators, Rockville MD, August 28, 2004.
- Plenary Address: Rethinking Rehabilitation: Freedom. 2004 World Congress Rehabilitation International, Oslo, Norway, June 21–24, 2004.
- Invited Lecture: The Politics of Memory: Ex-patient perspectives on the history of psychiatry in the United States. New York State Museum, Albany NY, June 5, 2004.
- Invited Lecture: Inside Outside: Building a Meaningful Life After the Hospital. 2004 Joint National Conference on Mental Health Block Grant and the National Conference on Mental Health Statistics. Washington DC, June 4, 2004.
- Keynote Address and Workshops: Inside Outside: Building a Meaningful Life After the Hospital; Beyond Coercion and Force: Medications, Non-Compliance and Shard Decision Making; Using Medications as Part of the Recovery Process; Self-Directed Recovery and the Role of the Professional. The Promise and Practice of Recovery, Rosen Plaza Hotel, Orlando, FL, June 2,3, 2004.
- Invited Lecture: Remember My Name: State Hospital Cemetery Restoration. When Disability History Goes Public. 2004 Annual Meeting of the Organization of American Historians. Marriott Copley Plaza, Boston, MA, March 28, 2004.
- Keynote Address: Recovery. META Inc., Phoenix, Arizona, November 14, 2003.
- Keynote Address: Inside Outside: Building a Meaningful Life in the Community after Long Term Institutionalization. Statewide conference of New York Office of Mental Health, Lake George, NY, November 6, 2003.
- Lecture: Practical Approaches to Supporting Client Recovery. Capital Region Mental Health, State of Connecticut, Hartford, CT, November 5, 2003.
- Invited Address: Issues in Community Integration for People with Psychiatric Disabilities. University of Bergen, Department of Family Medicine, Bergen, Norway, October 23, 2003.
- Invited Address: Recovery. SEREP. Oslo, Norway, October 21, 2003.
- Keynote address and Workshop: Recovery: the experience and empirical evidence; and A History of Consumer/Survivor/Ex-patient Advocacy. Wyoming Statewide Consumer Conference, Casper Wyoming, September 8, 2003.
- Keynote address, Institute and Workshop session: Recovery, Resistance and Resilience; The Intentional Care Approach to Client Choice; and A Recovery Based Approach to Using Psychiatric Medications, Voices in Recovery III, statewide conference in Rutland Vermont, July 14,15 2003.
- Keynote address, Institute and Workshop session: Recovery, Resistance and Resilience; Remember My Name: State hospital cemetery restoration; and The Intentional Care Approach to Client Choice. International Association of Psychosocial Rehabilitation Services, Atlanta Georgia, May 2003.
- Invited Lecture Series: Recovery and Hope: Changing our Approach and Expectations. Douglas Hospital, Montreal, Quebec, Canada, November 14,15, 2002.
- Keynote Address, Institute and Workshop Session: Consumer/Survivor/Ex-patient Resistance and Resilience; Recovery: A Global Perspective; and The Elusive concept of Resilience: Everyone Seems to Know What It Is…But Defines It Differently. Innovations in Recovery & Rehabilitation: Decade of the Person, Boston University, Park Plaza Hotel, Boston, Massachusetts, October 24–26.
- Keynote Address: Multicultural Perspectives on the History of Ex-Patient Resistance and Resilience in Mental Health Systems. National Alternatives Conference, Atlanta Georgia, September 21, 2002.
- Plenary Panel: Recovery: Then and Now. New York Association of Psychiatric Rehabilitation Annual Conference, Ellensville, NY, September 10–13, 2002.
- Panel Film Respondent: Victims of the Past. Hatikvah Holocaust Education and Resource Center and Springfield Citizen Advocacy, Springfield, MA, April 17, 2002.
- Lectures: Harrisburg State Hospital and Wernersville State Hospital: Recovery. Harrisburg and Wernersville, PA, April 11, 2002.
- Keynote Address: Co-occurring Disorders Conference: The Journey of Recovery. Yakima, WA, April 5, 2002.
- Seminar: Sweetser Mental Health Association: Beyond the Coke and Smoke Syndrome: Working With People Who Appear Unmotivated. Topsham, ME, April 3, 2002.
- Seminar: Northwest Mental Health Authority: Partners in Recovery: Enhancing Client Choice and Independence. Torrington, CT, March 20, 2002.
- Seminar: Pilgrim State Hospital: Recovery. Pilgrim Psychiatric Center, Long Island, New York, March 7, 2002.
- Keynote Address: Massachusetts Statewide Human Rights Conference: The Consumer/Survivor/Ex-Patient Movement: Celebrating Our Pride. Marlborough, MA, October 29, 2001.
- Lecture: The 3rd Annual Dennis J. McCrory Seminar, The Invisible Revolution: Recovery, Rehabilitation and Community Integration. Change Does Not Equal Progress. South Shore Mental Health, Randolph MA, October 25, 2001.
- Lecture: 129th Annual Meeting of the American Public Health Association: History of Ex-patient Resistance to Psychiatric Oppression. Martin Luther King Jr. National Historic Site, Atlanta, Georgia, October 22, 2001.
- Lecture: Invited Lecturer Series, Department of Social Work, University of Southern Maine: Recovery Principles and Practice and State Hospital Cemetery Restoration, A Slideshow and Discussion. Portland, Maine, October 10, 2001.
- Lecture: Sweetser Mental Health Inc.: Intentional Care and the Recovery Process. Freeport Maine, October 10, 2001.
- Keynote Address and Institute: International Assertive Community Treatment Conference: Principles of the Recovery Process and A New Approach to Establishing Professional Boundaries. Grand Rapids, MI, June 20 – 22, 2001.
- Lecture: Mental Health Lecture Series Eliot Community Human Services, Inc.: Recovering from Major Mental Illness. Emerson Hospital, Concord, MA, June 18, 2001.
- Address: New York State Museum and Archives and the New York State Office of Mental Health, Bureau of Recipient Affairs: The Politics of Memory: Ex-patient History as Liberating Praxis. Albany, NY, June 14, 2001
- Keynote Address: Baltimore Country Department of Health, Bureau of Mental Health/Core Service Agency, Department of Social Services: Principles of the Recovery Process. Baltimore, MD, June 5, 2001.
- Keynote Address and Workshop: The Mental Health Corporation of Denver and Access Behavioral Health Care: Overcoming Oppression and Stigma Associated with Mental Illness and Principles and Themes of the Recovery Process. Second Annual Consumer/Family/Provider Partnership in Recovery Conference, Denver, CO, May 31 – June 1, 2001.
- Day-long Presentation: Principles and Themes of the Recovery Process, Waterbury, CT. Mental Health Authority, Waterbury, CT., May, 2001.
- Plenary Panel and Workshop: Pathways to Recovery. Maine State Office of Mental Health, Lewiston, ME., April, 2001.
- Keynote address: National Summit of State Hospital Superintendents sponsored by the National Association of State Mental Health Program Directors, Truth and Reconciliation and State Mental Health Systems Through State-Hospital Cemetery Restoration, Alexandria, VA., March, 2001.
- One hour statewide telebroadcast for the South Carolina Department of Mental Health, Recovery is Real. Columbia, S.C., January, 2001.
- Invited address at the Center for Mental Health Services/SAMHSA: Combating Stigma through State Hospital Cemetery Restoration. Rockville, MD., December 2000.
- Seminar at the University of Bergen. An Invitation To Reflect on the Meaning and Enduring Value of Our Work. Bergen, Norway, November, 2000.
- Keynote address at the annual conference of the National Association of Rights, Protection and Advocacy, The Politics of Memory. Sacramento, CA., November, 2000.
- Keynote address at the SAMHSA National Alternatives Conference, The Politics of Memory. Nashville, TN. October, 2000
- Invited address at the meeting of the American Psychological Association - Division of Community Psychology - Recovery from Mental Illness. Washington, D.C., August, 2000
- Tele-broadcast (3 hours) at the Department of Psychiatry, University of Arizona, - Principles of the Recovery Process. Tucson, AZ., June 2000.
- Keynote address at Kansas Statewide Conference - Hope and Recovery. Kansas Department of Mental Health, Lawrence, KS., June 2000.
- Staff training at Advocates, Inc. - Overcoming Learned Helplessness. Newton MA May 2000.
- Keynote address at the Adults System of Care Conference, - Principles and Themes of the Recovery Process. California Department of Mental Health & California Mental Health Institute, San Jose, CA., April 2000.
- Invited address at the Department of Mental Health, Rhode Island - Recovery Models and Systems Implications. Kingston, RI., April 2000.
- Keynote address at Colorado Statewide conference: Recovery principles and themes and Beyond the coke and smoke syndrome: Working with people who appear unmotivated. Mental Health Corporation of Denver, Denver, CO, March 2000.
- Grand Rounds presentation at the New Hampshire State Hospital - Recovery from mental illness. Concord, NH, March 2000.
- Guest lecturer (6 hours) University of Ohio College of Medicine, Department of Psychiatry - Slideshow: the history and issues of the ex-patient movement, A recovery model for using psychiatric medications, and Principles and themes of the recovery process. Toledo, OH, January 2000.
- Invited address at Syracuse University's Maxwell School of Social Policy and Research: Recovery from mental illness. Syracuse, NY, November 1999.
- Plenary address at the Associacao Para O Estudo E Integracao Psicossocial: Principles and themes of the recovery process. Lisbon, Portugal October 1996.
- Keynote address at the National Association of State Mental Health Program Directors National Summit for State Hospital Superintendents: An invitation to reflect on the meaning and enduring value of our work. Alexandria, VA., October 1999.
- Keynote address at the Wisconsin Psychiatric Emergency Services Conference: Recovery approaches for managing crisis. Wisconsin Department of Mental Health. Wisconsin Falls, WI, September 1999.
- Keynote address for MIND Inc., Birmingham England: 1st Lecture: Recovery from mental illness. Birmingham, England, September 1999.
- Keynote address for conference titled, Recovery, an alien concept for MIND, Inc. (providers): 2nd Lecture: Principles and themes of the recovery process. Birmingham, England. September, 1999.
- Keynote address for Georgia Consumer Network Statewide Conference, Recovery and healing: approaches, self-help strategies and supports. Georgia Department of Mental Health, St. Simons Island GA., August 1999.
- Keynote address for the New York State Office of Recipient Affairs Statewide Conference: Recovering, discovering and celebrating consumer/survivor history. Catskills, NY, June, 1999.
- Keynote address for the Ohio Department of Mental Health's statewide conference on recovery: Principles and themes of the recovery process. Columbus, OH. June, 1999.
- Invited address to the National Association of Consumer/Survivor Mental Health Administrators, Recovering and discovering consumer/survivor history in your state. St. Petersburg, FL, January, 1999.
- Invited address to Behavioral Healthcare Arizona: Recovery from mental illness. Value Options Managed Care Co. Phoenix, AZ., November, 1998.
- Invited address to Vermont Psychiatric Survivors, Inc., "Recovery and you." Sponsored by the Vermont Department of Mental Health, Montpelier, VT., November, 1998.
- Keynote address to Kansas Department of Mental Health Statewide Casemanagement Conference"The Sea Rose: A journey of recovery.", Lawrence, KS., November, 1998.
- Keynote address to the Iowa Department of Mental Health Statewide Mental Health Conference,: "Principles of the recovery process." Cedar Rapids, Iowa. October, 1998.
- Keynote address at the Pennsylvania Statewide Casemanagement Conference,: "The sea rose: a journey of recovery." Pennsylvania Department of Mental Health & Hahnemann University, Harrisburg, PA., September,1998.
- National tele-broadcast through the Department of Psychiatry, School of Medicine, University of Arizona: "Beyond the coke and smoke syndrome: working with people who appear unmotivated, Part 2". Tucson, AZ., July 1998.
- Keynote address at Utah Department of Mental Health Statewide Mental Health Conference: "Recovery from mental illness." Park City UT., May 1998.
- Grand Rounds and invited address to the University of Manitoba Medical School, Department of Psychiatry,: "Using medications as part of the recovery process" and "Supporting people in recovery from mental illness." Winnipeg, Manitoba, Canada. April, 1998.
- Keynote address at the Mid-west Regional Recovery Summit organized by the National Technical Assistance Association: "Principle of the recovery process", Omaha Nebraska April 1998.
- Invited address to the New York Alliance for the Mentally Ill: "Recovery and healing." Rockland, NY~~.,~~ March 1998.
- National tele-broadcast from the Division of Rehabilitation, Department of Psychiatry, School of Medicine, University of Arizona,: "Beyond the coke and smoke syndrome: Working with people who appear unmotivated." Tucson, AZ., March 1998.
- Lecture tour of Auckland, Rotorua and Wellington New Zealand: "Recovery" and "Hearing distressing voices: a simulation experience and training". February 1998.
- Invited address for the Georgia Consumer Network, "Slideshow: Our history, our stories and our heritage." Georgia Department of Mental Health, Milledgeville GA: December 1997.
- Keynote address at the Human Rights Statewide Conference, "Slideshow: An invitation to reflect on the meaning and enduring value of our work." Massachusetts Department of Mental Health, Sturbridge MA., November 1997.
- Keynote address at Kentucky Department of Mental Health Statewide Mental Health Conference, "Empowerment and recovery." Louisville, KY., October 1997.
- Keynote address National Mental Health Conference, "Empowerment and Recovery" and "Hearing distressing voices: a simulation experience and training." for the New Zealand Ministry of Health and the Hamilton Trust, Hamilton, NZ, August 1997.
- Keynote address at "Learning From Us Conference": "Slide show: An invitation to reflect on the meaning and enduring value of our work" Sponsored by the National Empowerment Center, Albuquerque, NM., March 1997.
- Keynote address at the bi-annual meeting of the National Association of State Mental Health Program Directors,: "Slideshow: An invitation to reflect on the meaning and enduring value of our work." Breckenridge. CO., July,1997.
- Keynote address at Statewide Case-management Conference: "The sea rose: a journey of recovery." Allentown PA., June 1997.
- Designed and delivered a 6-month system-wide course "Psychosis and Coping" via telecommunications for the University of Alaska, from Anchorage, AK.
- Lecture tour sponsored by University of Alaska "Recovering from mental illness" and "Hearing distressing voices: a simulation experience and training." Anchorage and Juneau AK: May 1997.
- Keynote address at Statewide Consumer Conference, sponsored by NY Office of Mental Health: "Self-help and recovery" Binghamton, NY, May 1997.
- Grand Rounds at the Veteran's Administration Hospital: "Coping with hearing voices." Bedford, MA., April 1997.
- Invited address to Maine Consumer Network: "Recovery and healing." Portland, M., March 1997.
- Keynote address at the Mental Health Services Conference of Australia and New Zealand "There’s a Person In Here." Brisbane, Australia, September, 1996.
- Keynote address at the World Association of Psychosocial Rehabilitation "Recovery as a journey of the heart." Rotterdam, The Netherlands. April, 1996.
- Invited lecture at a national gathering of mental health professionals and service users, sponsored by the Ministry of Health: "Empowerment and Recovery". Oslo, Norway, April, 1996.
- Keynote address at "The experience of recovery and implications for curriculum development and field supervision of students in mental health related disciplines". "Recovery as a journey of the heart." Conference sponsored by Massachusetts Department of Mental Health, Center for Psychiatric Rehabilitation (BU) and the Massachusetts Alliance for the Mentally Ill. Gardner Auditorium, State House, Boston, MA, May 1995.
- Keynote address at the First International Conference on Social Work in Health and Mental Health Care, "Recovery and Empowerment." Jerusalem, Israel, January 1995.
- Keynote address at the "Dare to Vision: Shaping the National Mental Health Agenda on Abuse in the Lives of Women Labeled with Mental Illness: "Dare to vision." Conference sponsored by SAMHSA. Arlington, VA, July 1994.
- Plenary address at the Canadian and American Occupational Therapy Association Annual Conference Recovery and empowerment for people with psychiatric disabilities." Boston, MA, July 1994.
- Keynote address at Connecticut Mental Health Center conference, Yale University, "Recovering our sense of value after being labeled mentally ill." New Haven, CT, October, 1993.
- Keynote address for Community Support Programs of the Alaska Department of Mental Health: "Recovery, rehabilitation and the conspiracy of hope." Anchorage, AK., October 1993.
- Visiting Scholar and Keynote Address: "Spirit-breaking: When the Helping Professions Hurt" and 3-week course "Mental Health Services from the Patient’s Point of View: What the Clinician Should Know." International Symposium in Phenomenology and Psychology. Duquesne University, Pittsburgh, PA, July 1993.
- Keynote address for National Rehabilitation Conference sponsored by the three NIDRR national technical assistance centers (BU, U of I, U of S.FLA) "Recovering our sense of value after being labeled mentally ill." Tampa, FL, January 1993.
- Grand rounds, Department of Psychiatry, Royal Ottawa Hospital, "Recovery from mental illness and the empowerment process." Ottawa, Ontario, Canada, April, 1992.
- Grand rounds, Department of Psychiatry, Harvard Medical School, "Recovery from mental illness." Boston, MA, Fall 1992.

== See also ==
- Recovery model
- Personal medicine
- CommonGround
