= Gene A. Deegan =

United States Marine Corps general

- Born: August 3, 1936 (age 90); Lewisville, Minnesota, U.S.
- Military career
- Allegiance: United States
- Branch: United States Marine Corps
- Service years: 1958–1991
- Rank: Major general
- Commands: Marine Corps Air-Ground Combat Center
- Conflicts: Vietnam War

Gene Austin Deegan (born August 3, 1936) is a retired major general in the United States Marine Corps. He attended the United States Naval Academy, graduating in 1958. He served as commanding general of the Marine Corps Air-Ground Combat Center in Twentynine Palms, California.
