= CommonGround (software) =

Web app

- Developers: Pat Deegan, PhD & Associates, LLC
- Initial release: October 2006
- Available in: English
- Type: Medical software
- License: Commercial proprietary software
- Website: www.patdeegan.com/software

CommonGround is a Web app that helps mental health clients identify treatment preferences and effectively communicate them to clinicians. CommonGround Software supports shared-decision making in behavioral health. It brings the voice of the individual to the center of the care team. In this way, the team can focus on "what matters to you" rather than "what's the matter with you?"

People diagnosed with mental health disorders are often faced with complex treatment options. Shared decision making can be useful when medical evidence does not suggest a clearly optimal treatment path. The program makes use of shared decision making to increase the effectiveness and efficiency of consultations, and has led to higher levels of satisfaction among clients.

== History ==
CommonGround was first implemented by Patricia Deegan in 2006 in conjunction with the Kansas Department of Social and Rehabilitation Services. Providers can license the software for a monthly and yearly fee, which varies according to the number of users.

== Award and nomination ==
- Winner of the 2013 Innovation Award of the Scattergood Foundation
- Finalist at the "Patients | Choices | Empowerment" competition of Ashoka Changemakers
