= Minny Mock-Degen =

Dutch anthropologist, writer, and publisher (1945–2020)

Minny Evaline Mock-Degen (4 May 1945, Vevey – 11 April 2020, Israel) was a Dutch anthropologist, writer, and publisher, best remembered for her PhD dissertation titled 'The Dynamics of Becoming Orthodox: Dutch Jewish women returning to Judaism and how their mothers felt about it' (2006), as well as other publications, such as 'Rijkdom: Joodse naoorlogse verhalen' (2018), her activism for Dutch Jews, for translating Israeli books into Dutch, and printing Jewish literature.

In 1978, she established a Dutch non-profit for the publication and distribution of Jewish books, and named it 'Amphora Books'. She ran the non-profit together with her husband, Harry Mock. Their oldest son, Leo Mock, also contributed to this non-profit by publishing various books.
