= Christoph Degen =

German politician (born 1980)

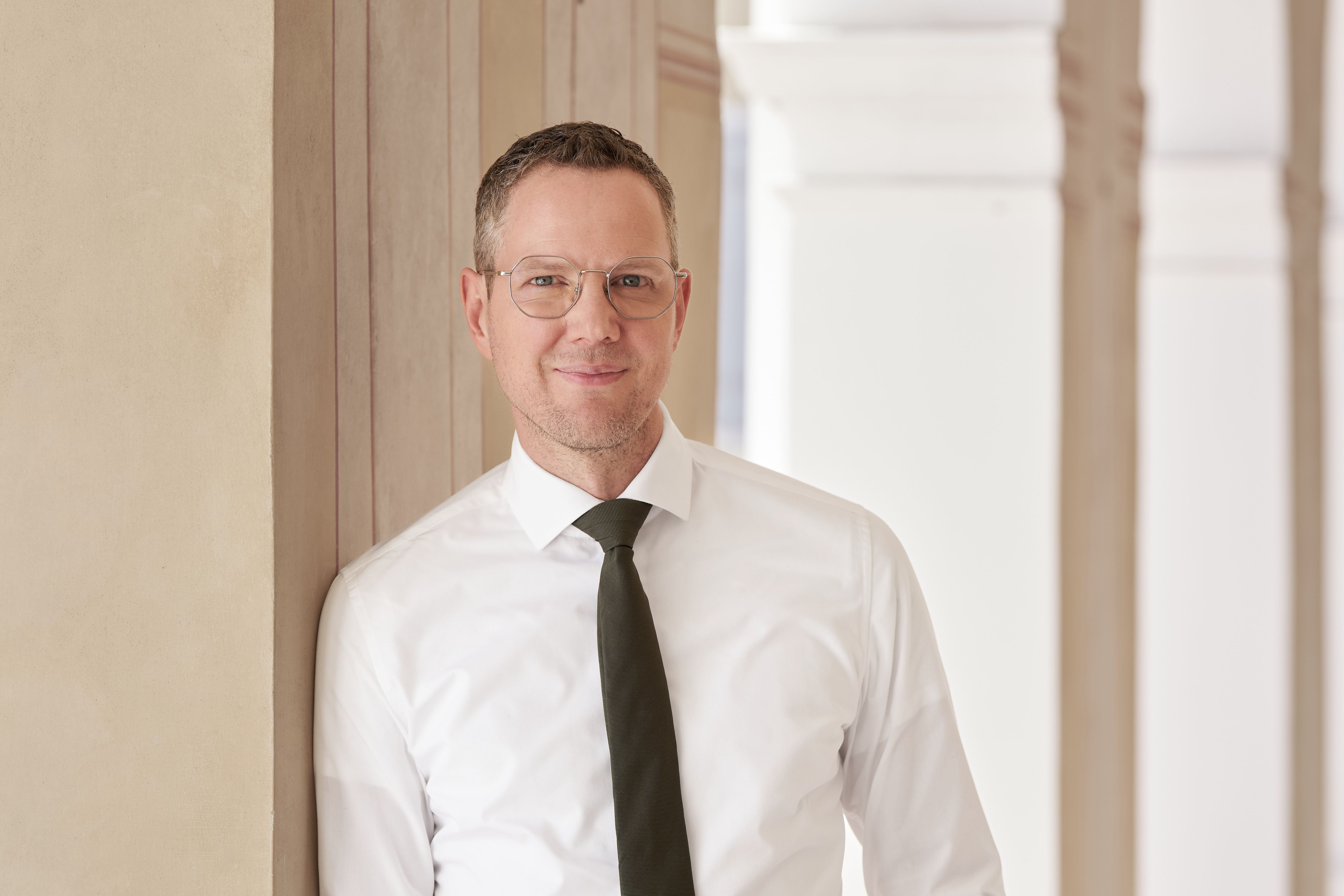
- Degen in 2025

Member of the Landtag of Hesse
- In office 18 January 2014 – 18 January 2024
- Succeeded by: Cirsten Kunz-Strueder
- Constituency: Main-Kinzig I (2018–2024)
- In office 5 April 2008 – 19 November 2008

Personal details
- Born: 12 March 1980 (age 46) Offenbach am Main
- Party: Social Democratic Party (since 1999)

Christoph Degen (born 12 March 1980 in Offenbach am Main) is a German politician serving as state secretary of science, research, arts and culture of Hesse since 2024. He was a member of the Landtag of Hesse from April to November 2008 and from 2014 to 2024.
