= Robert P. Deegan =

American academic administrator

Robert P. Deegan is an American academic administrator. He is the 9th permanent President of Palomar College, a community college in San Marcos, California, appointed in 2004. During his tenure, the school successfully secured the passage of Proposition M, a $694-million general obligation bond measure. In October 2014, Deegan announced his retirement.

He holds a bachelor's degree in psychology and a master's degree in counseling from San Francisco State University, and in 2004 was enrolled at Oregon State University. He worked at Irvine Valley College and then Santiago Canyon College, both California community colleges.
