= Dever =

Dever is a surname. Notable people with the surname include:

- Barbara Dever (born 1951), opera singer, appeared with Luciano Pavarotti, Plácido Domingo, Zubin Mehta
- Benjamin M. Dever (died 1942), American politician
- Dan Dever (born 1946), Canadian football player
- Dick Dever (born 1952), American politician
- Edmonde Dever (1921–2010), Belgian diplomat
- James C. Dever III (born 1962), United States federal judge
- James Dever (1825–1904), Irish-born merchant and political figure in New Brunswick, Canada
- Jill Dever, American statistician
- Joe Dever (1956–2016), award-winning British fantasy author and game designer
- Juliana Dever (born 1980), American actress and travel blogger
- Kaitlyn Dever (born 1996), American actress
- Mark Dever (born 1960), senior pastor of the Capitol Hill Baptist Church in Washington, D.C.
- Maryanne Dever (born 1963), Australian academic
- Paul A. Dever (1903–1958), Democratic politician from Boston, Massachusetts
- Seamus Dever (born 1976), American actor
- William Emmett Dever (1862–1929), the Democratic mayor of Chicago, Illinois, U.S. from 1923 to 1927
- William G. Dever (born 1933), American archaeologist, specialising in the history of Israel and the Near East in Biblical times
