= Marilyn Deegan =

British scientist and historian

Marilyn Deegan is the former Director of Research Development at the former Centre for Computing in the Humanities, now the Department of Digital Humanities), King's College London.

Deegan was Editor of the Literary and Linguistic Computing journal, Oxford University Press.

== Bibliography ==
- Ed. Medicine in Early Mediaeval England (with D. Scragg), Manchester Centre for Anglo-Saxon Studies, 1989.
- Hypermedia in the humanities, 1992.
- New Technologies for the Humanities, British Library, 1996.
- Digital Futures: Strategies for the Information Age (with Simon Tanner), Neal-Schuman Publishers, 2002.
- Ed. Digital Preservation (with Simon Tanner), Neal-Schuman Publishers, 2006.
- (ed.) Text Editing, Print and the Digital World with Kathryn Sutherland, Ashgate, 2008.
- Being a Pilgrim: Art and Ritual on the Medieval Routes to Santiago (with Kathleen Ashley), Lund Humphries Pub, 2009.
- Transferred Illusions (with Kathryn Sutherland), Ashgate, 2009.
