= Henry Degen House =

Historic house in Missouri, United States

- U.S. National Register of Historic Places
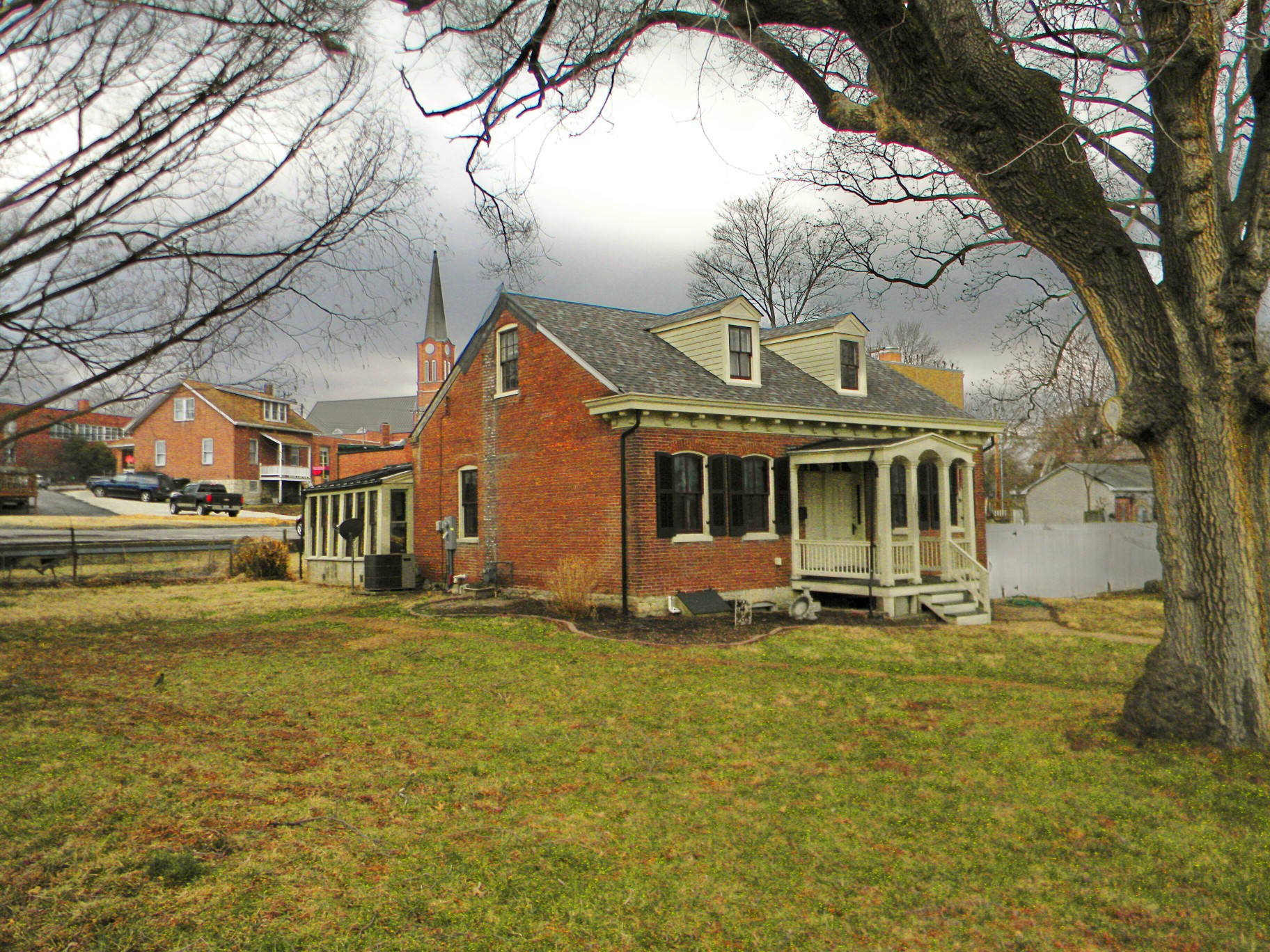
- Degen House, March 2014

- Location within Missouri Location within the United States
- Location: 112 W. 4th St., Washington, Missouri
- Coordinates: 38°33′28″N 91°0′49″W
- Area: less than one acre
- Built: c. 1873
- Built by: Degan, John
- Architectural style: Victorian Missouri-German
- MPS: Washington, Missouri MPS
- NRHP reference No.: 00001095
- Added to NRHP: September 14, 2000

Henry Degen House is a historic home located at Washington, Franklin County, Missouri. It was built in about 1873, and is a 1 1/2-story, five-bay, double entrance brick dwelling on a stone foundation. It has a side-gable roof and segmental arched door and window openings. It features an ornate front porch across the center bay. It was listed on the National Register of Historic Places in 2000.
