= MST1 =

Protein-coding gene in the species Homo sapiens

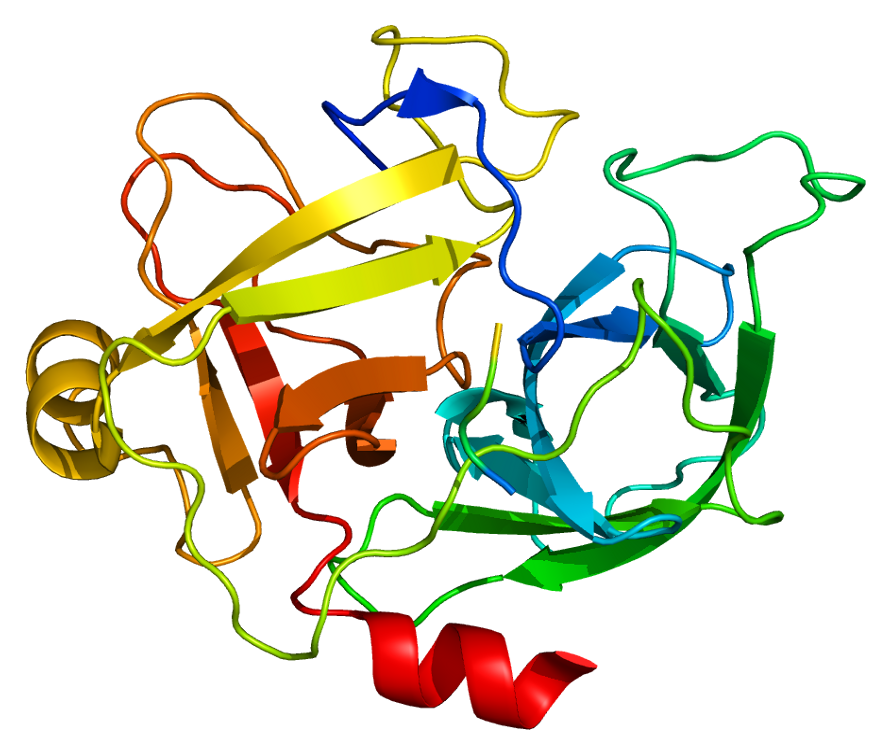

Identifiers
- Aliases: MST1, D3F15S2, DNF15S2, HGFL, MSP, NF15S2, macrophage stimulating 1
- External IDs: OMIM: 142408; MGI: 96080; GeneCards: MST1
Available structures
PDB	Ortholog search: PDBe RCSB
PDB	List of PDB id codes 2ASU, 4QT8

Gene location (Human)
Chr.	Chromosome 3 (human)
Band	3p21.31	Start	49,683,947 bp
Band	3p21.31	End	49,689,501 bp

Gene location (Mouse)
Chr.	Chromosome 9 (mouse)
Band	9 F1|9 59.07 cM	Start	107,957,635 bp
Band	9 F1|9 59.07 cM	End	107,962,202 bp
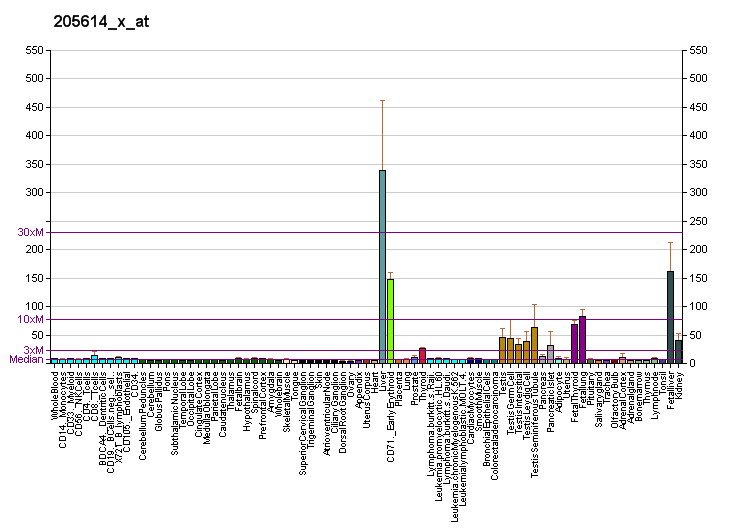

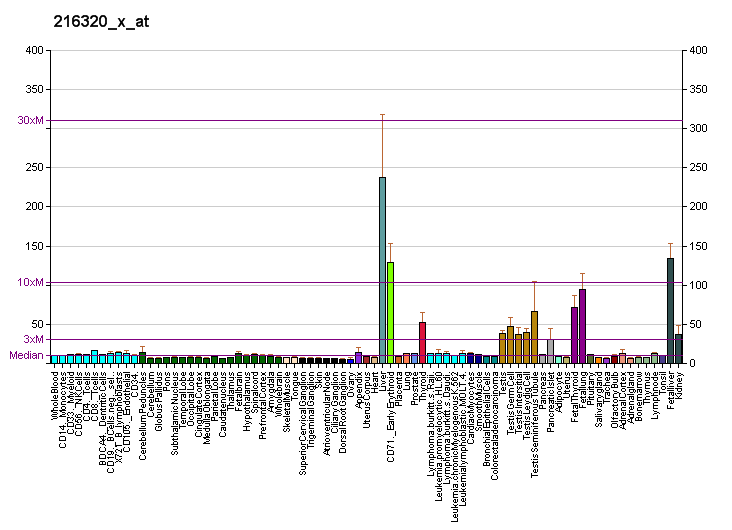

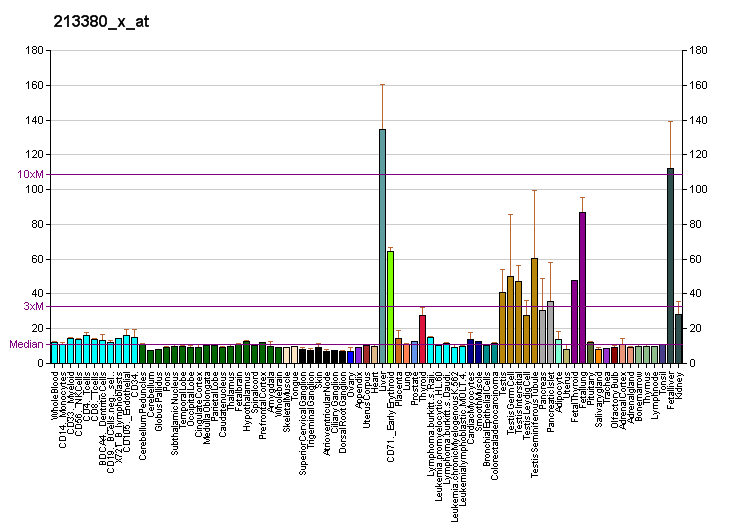
RNA expression pattern
Bgee	Human / Mouse (ortholog); Top expressed in: right lobe of liver; duodenum; left testis; left lobe of thyroid gland; right testis; right lobe of thyroid gland; human kidney; right uterine tube; pituitary gland; left adrenal cortex / Top expressed in: left lobe of liver; liver parenchyma; fetal liver hematopoietic progenitor cell; ankle joint; embryo; transitional epithelium of urinary bladder; embryo; esophagus; lip; corneal stroma; More reference expression data
BioGPS	More reference expression data
Gene ontology
Molecular function	receptor tyrosine kinase binding; protein binding; serine-type endopeptidase activity
Cellular component	extracellular region; extracellular space; collagen-containing extracellular matrix
Biological process	proteolysis; regulation of cAMP-dependent protein kinase activity; hepatocyte growth factor receptor signaling pathway; negative regulation of gluconeogenesis; regulation of macrophage chemotaxis; positive regulation of mammary gland epithelial cell proliferation
Sources:Amigo / QuickGO
Orthologs
Databases	NCBI: entry; OMA: entry
Species	Human	Mouse
Entrez	4485	15235
Ensembl	ENSG00000173531	ENSMUSG00000032591
UniProt	P26927	P26928
RefSeq (mRNA)	NM_020998; NM_001393581; NM_001393582; NM_001393583; NM_001393584 NM_001393585	NM_008243
RefSeq (protein)	NP_066278	NP_032269
Location (UCSC)	Chr 3: 49.68 – 49.69 Mb	Chr 9: 107.96 – 107.96 Mb
PubMed search
- Wikidata
View/Edit Human	View/Edit Mouse

Macrophage-stimulating protein (MSP), also known as hepatocyte growth factor-like protein (HLP, HGFL, or HGFLP), is a protein that in humans is encoded by the MST1 (macrophage-stimulating 1) gene.
