= Huys Dever =

Castle in Lisse, Netherlands

- Lisse, the Netherlands
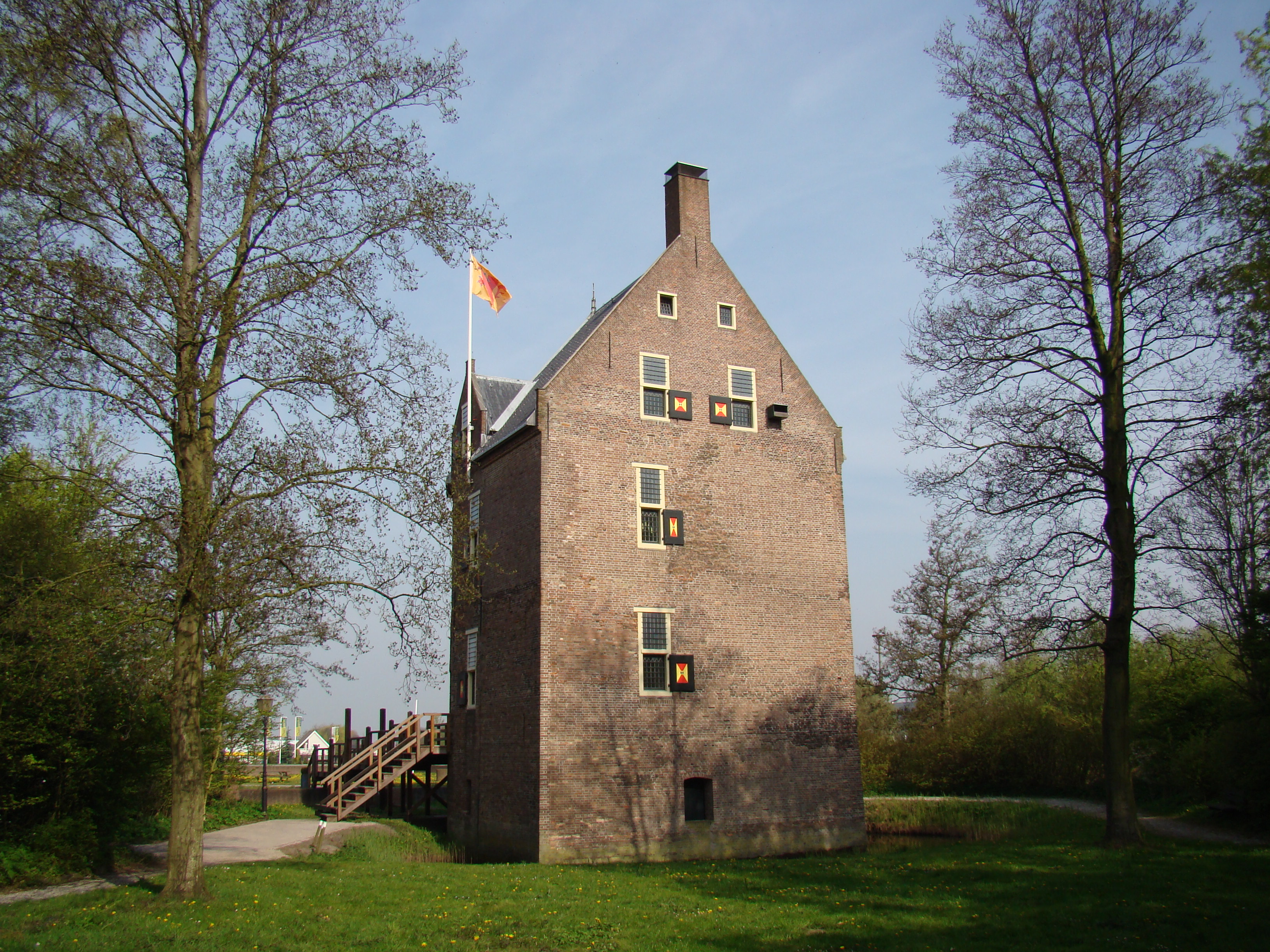
- Huys Dever

Site information
- Type: Castle
- Open to the public: Yes
- Condition: Good

Location
- The Netherlands
- Coordinates: 52°14′56″N 4°32′51″E

Site history
- Built: 1375
- Built by: Reinier Dever or d'Ever
- Materials: Brick

The Huys Dever is a small castle in Lisse, Netherlands. It was probably built shortly after 1375 by Reinier Dever or d'Ever, a member of an old noble family from Holland.

== History ==
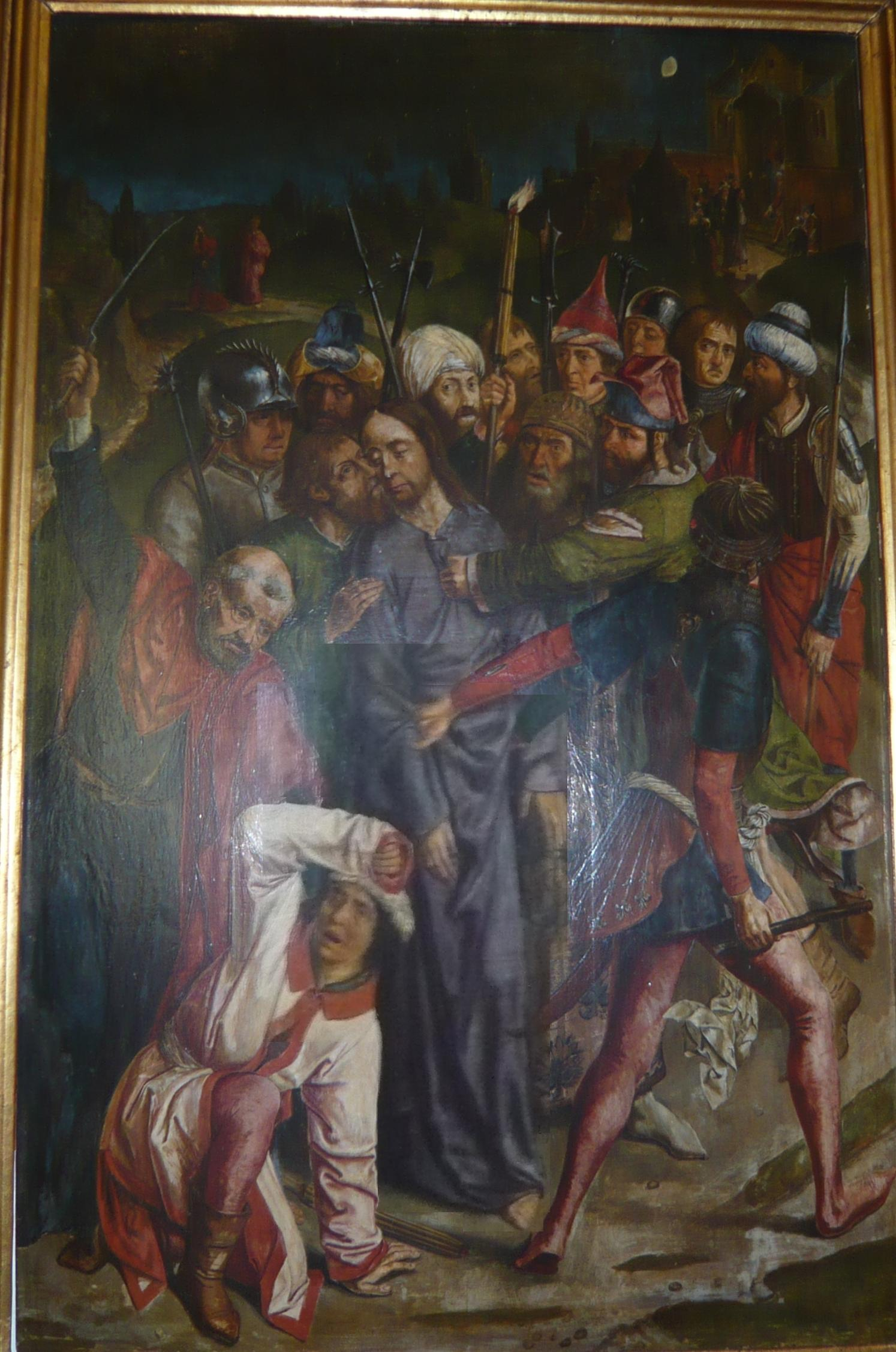
Arrest of Jesus, painting by a follower of Dieric Bouts, late 15th century

The castle was a typical stronghold that was at one time situated on the edge of a lake called the Lisser Poel (since poldered in) that itself was in connection to the Haarlemmermeer (itself a polder since in 1853). In 1630 a stately home was built on to the tower and became a summer residence, but after the Haarlem Lake was poldered in the 19th century it fell into disuse and became a ruin. In 1973 restoration began and the roof was built in the manner of 16th century carpentry.

== Building today ==
The building houses a small archeological museum with finds dug up in the former moat around the building. It has been voted a very important rijksmonument for its early medieval remains. The building is open to visitors Wednesday-Sunday 14:00-17:00, and can be rented for events.
