= Degan, Churu =

Village in India

Degan is a village in Sardarshahar tehsil of Churu district, Rajasthan, India, there are nearly 200 houses. Rooplisar is the gram panchayat of the village. The village had a total population of 1340 in 2011, and has a total geographical area of 1404.85 hectares. Usually people speak the Bagri language. Kharif crop is the main source of income.
