= Edmonde Dever =

Belgian diplomat

Edmonde Dever (1921 - 2010) was a Belgian diplomat who became Belgium's permanent representative at the United Nations in 1981, having previously deputised in the role.

Dever was born in Brussels, and studied at the University of Liège and the Free University of Brussels. After graduating with a BA in history, she obtained a doctorate in Law, and entered Belgium's diplomatic service in 1946, initially serving in colonial administration. She was posted to Belgium's embassy in the UK in 1949, in 1959 to Johannesburg, South Africa, and shortly afterwards to Luanda, Angola.

Dever served as Belgium's ambassador to Sweden from 1973 to 1978 and to Austria from 1978 to 1981. Her appointment as UN representative lasted from 1981 to 1988.

Honours accorded to Dever include Belgium's Order of Leopold and Order of the Crown, Luxembourg's Order of the Oak, Sweden's Order of the Polar Star and Austria's Order of Merit.

== Personal life ==
Dever never married. An opera enthusiast who enjoyed sport and took up skiing during her time in the United States, she later began to suffer from a muscular degenerative condition.
