= Degan (surname) =

Degan is an anglicised Irish-language surname, and may refer to:

- Raz Degan (born 1968), Israeli model
- William Degan (20th century), United States Marshal

== See also ==
- Bruce Degen (born 1945), illustrator of The Magic School Bus series of children's books
