= EGA Master =

Spanish tool manufacturer

- Company type: Privately held company
- Industry: Manufacturing
- Founded: 1990; 36 years ago
- Founder: Iñaki Garmendia Ajuria
- Headquarters: Vitoria-Gasteiz, Basque Country, Spain
- Area served: Worldwide
- Products: Hand tools
- Website: www.egamaster.com

EGA Master is a Spanish manufacturer of tools for professional/industrial use. The company sells to customers worldwide in the oil and gas, mining, automotive, aerospace, civil engineering and construction, telecommunications and heavy industry sectors.

== History ==
The company was founded by Iñaki Garmendia Ajuria in 1990 and based in Vitoria-Gasteiz (Spain). Originally specialized in pipe tools it later diversified into a wider product range, including mechanical tools, non-sparking tools, titanium non-magnetic tools, insulated tools and explosion-proof intrinsically safe instruments. It patented the Basque Wrench, among other worldwide patents.

By 2011, the company had customers in over 150 countries, and was selected in 2011 as one of the top 100 Spanish brands.
