= Dottle =

Unburnt tobacco and ashes left in a smoked tobacco pipe

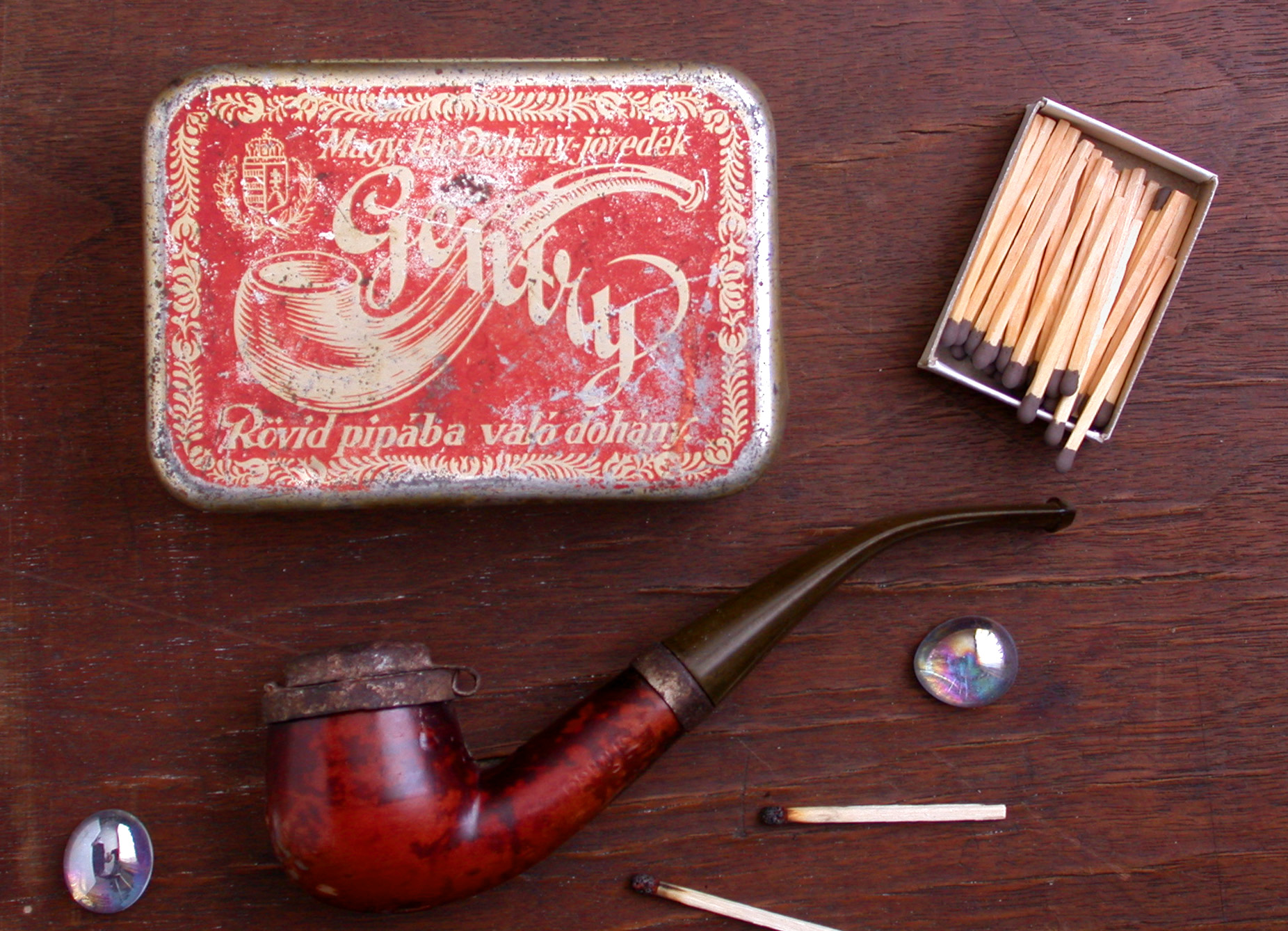
A pipe and tobacco-box from Hungary

Dottle is the remaining plug of unburnt tobacco and ashes left in the bottom of a tobacco pipe when it has been smoked.

== Etymology ==
The word is according to the Oxford English Dictionary apparently a diminutive of dot.

== Production ==
Dottle can be produced by different factors. The primary cause of an excessive amount of dottle is a tightly packed or otherwise improperly packed pipe, where the tobacco has been improperly prepared or is compressed and will not burn properly. A second possible cause can be the excessive moisture content of the tobacco and the tobacco being smoked too quickly. This can result in tobacco that is too wet to burn. Rapid or hard draws on the pipe can and will produce an excessively hot ember in the bowl causing the moisture content of the tobacco to vaporize and then condense in bottom of the bowl and in the draft hole, preventing the tobacco from burning properly. A third contributor to the creation of dottle is propylene glycol or "PG". This innocuous preservative used primarily in aromatic tobaccos can keep the moisture content high in pipe tobaccos even after drying. Smoking the pipe too fast can also produce a foul tasting liquid that collects at the bottom of the bowl and in the draft hole resulting in "pipe gurgle"; this can be inadvertently tasted. Pushing a pipe cleaner down the stem can remedy this problem to a point. Another possible cause of pipe gurgle can be a "wet smoker"; that is, a pipe smoker that pushes some saliva down the stem and into the bowl. Excessive saliva can be a factor but is rarely the cause of a "wet smoke" or pipe gurgle.

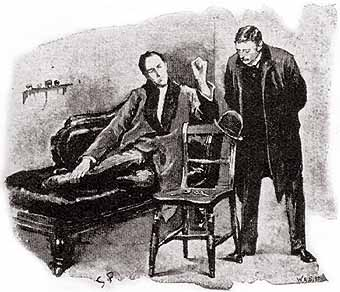
An illustration by Sidney Paget for Sir Arthur Conan Doyle's story The Adventure of the Blue Carbuncle which appeared in The Strand Magazine in January 1892. It shows Sherlock Holmes and Dr. Watson examining a felt hat. Holmes's pipe rack is on the wall next to him.

Dottles are generally considered troublesome because they lessen the time one may spend doing a bowl. Dottles can also give a sour taste to the smoke as it is approached by the hot ember. If dottle is not promptly removed after smoking using a pipe tool, the pipe may eventually give a foul taste to any tobacco smoked in it. When this happens, pipe sweetening is required.

Some pipes are designed to specifically lessen or prevent the formation of dottle and excessive moisture. The most common are the calabash pipe, the "Dry System" pipes made by Peterson, and aluminum-stemmed pipes from Falcon and Kirsten.

In the Sherlock Holmes stories, Holmes had a habit of drying out all the dottles from the day's pipes on a corner of his mantelpiece to be smoked the following morning.
