= Peterson Pipes =

Irish pipe maker

Kapp & Peterson Ltd.
- Type: Private
- Industry: Pipe smoking
- Founded: 1865
- Headquarters: Dublin, Ireland
- Key people: Frederick Kapp (founder); Charles Peterson (founder); Sykes Wilford (CEO); Joshua Burgess (VP, Manufacturing); Shane Ireland (VP, Retail)
- Products: Tobacciana
- Parent: Laudisi Enterprises
- Website: https://www.peterson.ie/

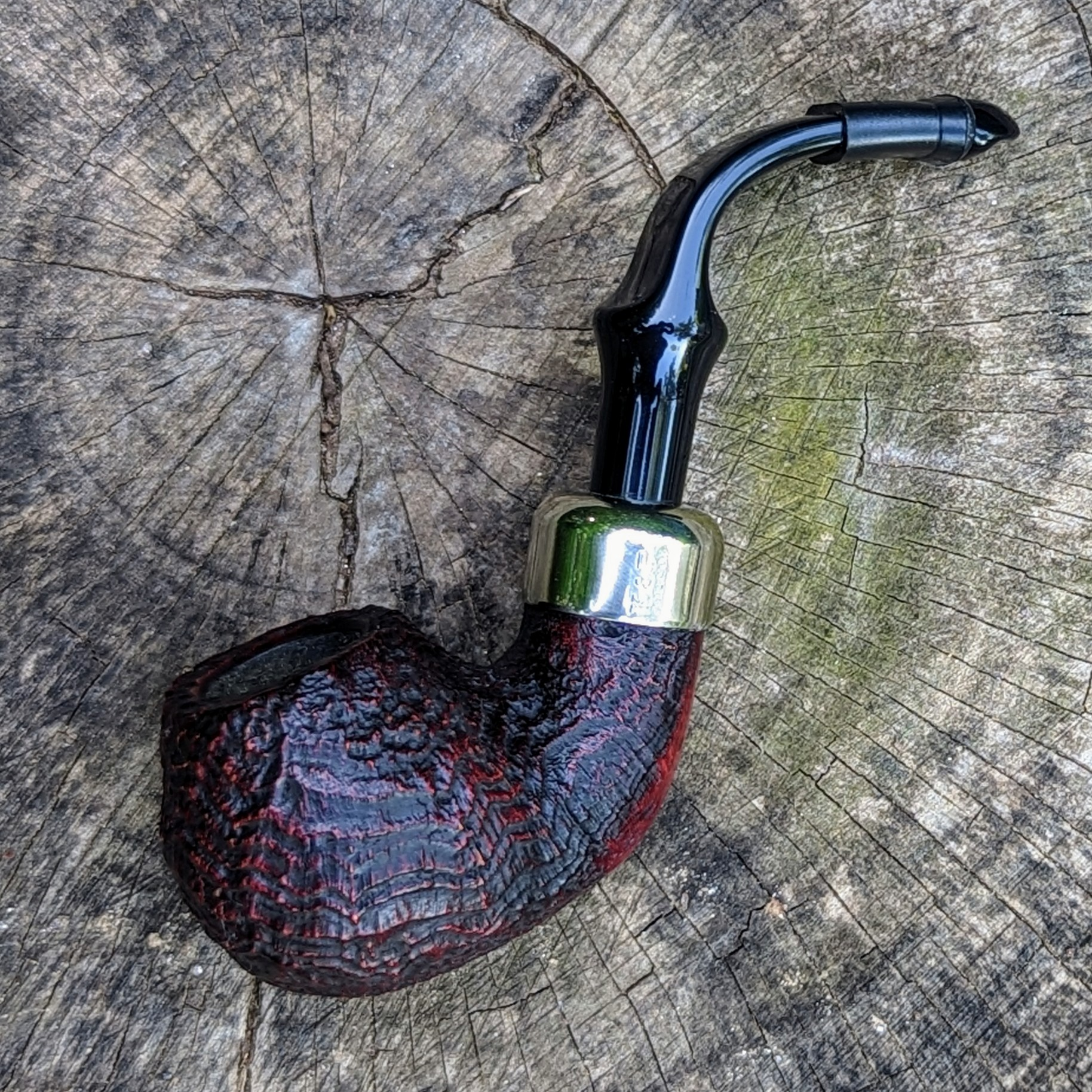
Peterson System Standard Pipe

Peterson is an Irish pipe maker headquartered in Dublin and founded in 1865.

== History ==
Friedrich and Heinrich Kapp, German immigrants to Ireland from Nuremberg, founded the famed Kapp Brothers store on Grafton Street, Dublin in 1865. Shortly thereafter, a Latvian immigrant, Charles Peterson became the third partner in the firm.

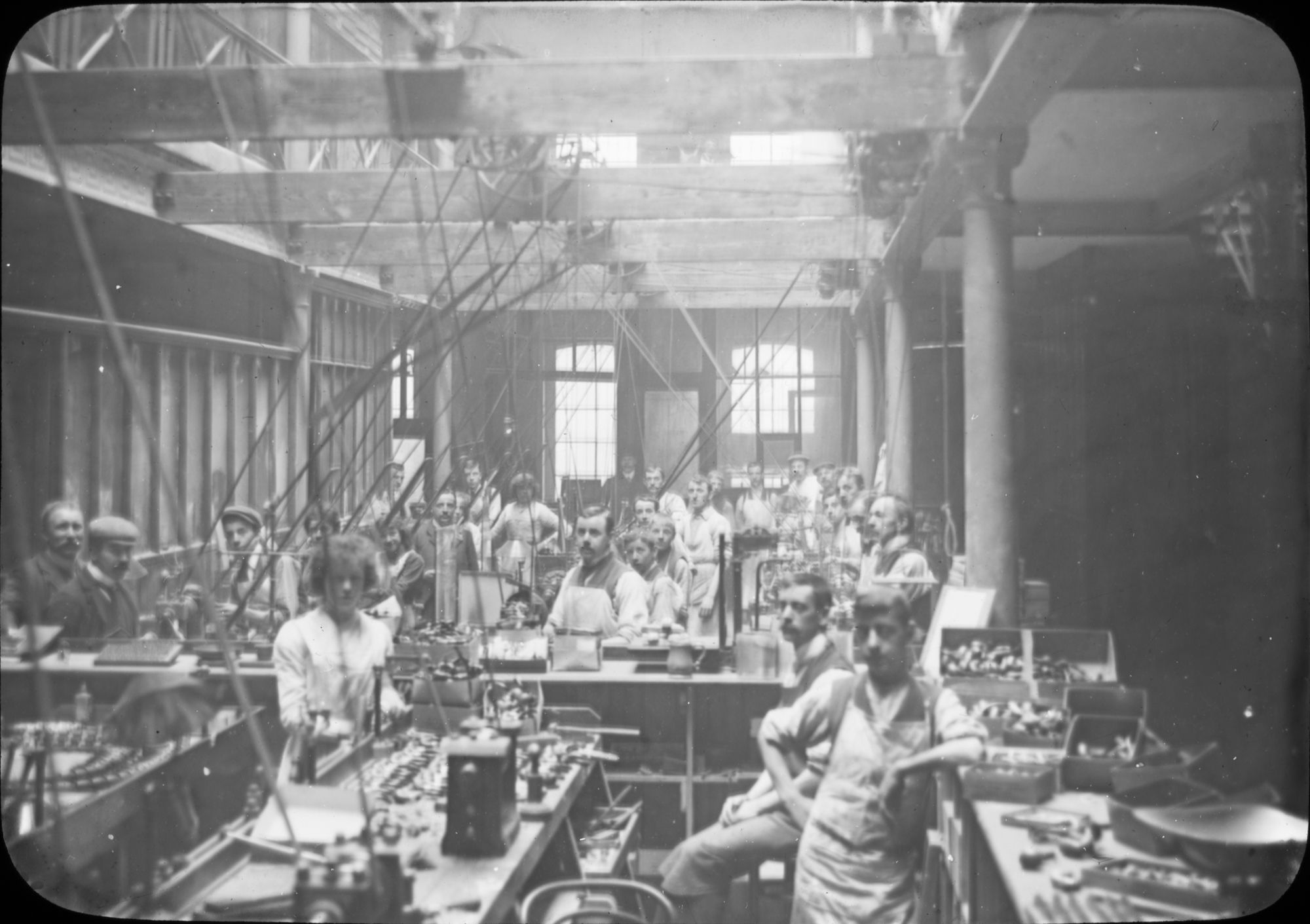
View of the production floor, circa 1911.

Originally based at 53 Grafton Street the business moved to 56 Lower Sackville Street (now O'Connell Street) on the corner with Bachelors Walk shortly after the Easter Rising. The name Kapp & Peterson Ltd can still be seen on the parapet of this building and the letters KP are formed in timber paneling on the shopfront.

For 30 years, Peterson was run by Thomas Palmer and made about 100,000 pipes annually that were distributed all over the world. In 2018, Laudisi Enterprises - parent company to both Smokingpipes.com and Cornell & Diehl - announced that they were purchasing Peterson

== Pipes ==
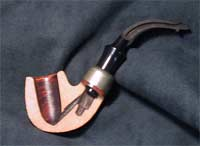
A Peterson Dry System Pipe cutaway

Perhaps the most notable design from the Kapp and Peterson factory was Peterson's famed 'Dry System' pipes, patented in 1894. Featuring a small reservoir intended to collect moisture before it reaches the smoker, the 'System Pipe' is designed to create a drier and cooler smoke and discourage the formation of dottle. The System Pipe is still a consistent top seller for Peterson.

Another notable design from Peterson is the so-called "P-lip": a mouthpiece that directs smoke upwards towards the roof of the mouth instead of the tongue. This is intended to produce a drier and less biting smoke than when smoke is directed at the tongue, as with other pipes.

Peterson offers many different lines of pipes, including their Army Filter, Aran, Deluxe System, Donegal Rocky, Dracula, Harp, Kildare, Sherlock Holmes, System Spigot, and System Standard pipes. They also produce a Pipe of the Year along with yearly holiday pipes that celebrate Christmas, Halloween, and St. Patrick's Day.

== Tobacco ==
Peterson was a producer of various blends of pipe tobacco, including popular Aromatic blends (such as Connoisseur's Choice), Burley/Virginia-based blends (such as Sherlock Holmes), and English-style blends (such as Old Dublin). In July 2018, the Scandinavian Tobacco Group announced that they had acquired the Peterson pipe tobacco brand and business from Peterson's parent company Kapp & Peterson Limited. In the same month, Laudisi Enterprises announced the acquisition of the remaining Peterson operations, namely the pipe factory and retail store.

== In creative works ==
In Act I of Samuel Beckett's Waiting for Godot the character Pozzo, who has lost his pipe, exclaims I've lost my Kapp and Peterson!

== Bibliography ==
- Irwin, Mark; Malmberg, Gary (2019). The Peterson Pipe: The story of Kapp & Peterson. Briar Book Press.

== See also ==
- Missouri Meerschaum
- Savinelli Pipes
