= Mary Hancock McLean =

Physician and missionary

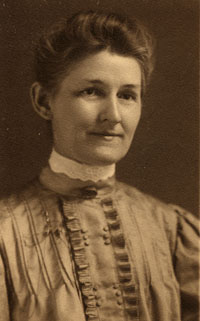
- "Dr. Mary Hancock McLean"
- Born: February 28, 1861; Washington, Missouri, U.S.
- Died: May 17, 1930 (aged 69); Washington, Missouri, U.S.
- Education: University of Michigan, Ann Arbor (MD); Vassar College (BA)
- Known for: Creation of Emmaus Home for Girls in St. Louis, Missouri and Missionary Work in Asia
- Scientific career
- Fields: Medicine; Community Development; Missionary

Mary Hancock McLean (February 28, 1861 – May 17, 1930) was a physician and missionary. Born to Elijah McLean, a physician, and Mary Stafford, she enjoyed a privileged childhood with academic opportunities uncommon for girls of her time period. After graduating from the University of Michigan Medical School, she became the first woman to hold an official position at the St. Louis Female Hospital and the first woman admitted to the St. Louis Medical Society.

McLean established a private practice in obstetrics and gynecology in 1885. Concerned with young women's health and hygiene, she established the Evening Dispensary for Women in 1893, the Emmaus Home for Girls, a precursor to the St. Louis Young Women's Christian Association, in 1904, and a free evening clinic for women in 1908. Interested in continuing her missionary work abroad, McLean traveled to China and Japan, where she operated in hospitals and learned about Chinese medical education.

She practiced medicine until five months before her death and died on May 17, 1930, aged 69, in St. Louis, having never married.

== Background and education ==
=== Early life ===
Mary Hancock McLean was born on February 28, 1861, to Elijah McLean, a local physician, and Mary Stafford in Washington, Missouri.

Despite his age (fifty-seven years old at the time of his daughter's birth), Elijah McLean was determined to provide her with the finest education. McLean was privately tutored until age thirteen.

=== Education ===
At age thirteen, McLean enrolled in Lindenwood University in St. Charles, Missouri and graduated with the class of 1878 three years later. She then transferred to Vassar College, from where she graduated two years later. Vassar College had just opened in 1865 and became one of the first institutions to provide women with an education comparable to that which men were receiving. Whereas female seminaries in the early nineteenth century prepared women for solely domestic roles, the opening of institutions such as Vassar College afforded women other options.

Medicine became a popular vocation for women as it was argued that it was an extension of their activities in the home by serving women and children. With dreams of becoming a physician like her father, McLean graduated with a medical degree from the University of Michigan Medical School, an institution more receptive to female students, in 1883.

== Career in St. Louis ==
=== St. Louis Female Hospital ===
With her father's influence and the help of a family friend, General Stevenson, McLean became an assistant physician at the St. Louis Female Hospital in 1884. She became the first woman to hold an official position in the city hospitals. In this position, she cared mainly for impoverished patients, especially prostitutes who suffered from venereal diseases. McLean was considered both a humanitarian and devout Presbyterian, who viewed her medical work as social reform and was as concerned with her patients' moral conditions as their physical ailments.

In 1885, with the support of her sponsor, the ophthalmologist Simon Pollak, McLean became the first woman to be admitted to the St. Louis Medical Society. She would later become one of the few female members of the American College of Surgeons and a fellow of the American Medical Association.

=== Private practice in obstetrics and gynecology ===
In 1885, McLean established a private practice in obstetrics and gynecology. Her father financed her practice. However, she encountered many obstacles in renting office space as landlords feared that the stigma of housing a female physician would lead to lower property values. She finally found a residence on Olive Street in a neighborhood known as "Scab Row" but was not allowed to post any signs with her name or profession. One of her colleagues, Frances L. Bishop, described McLean's first few weeks in private practice:

″It was slow work establishing herself, for there were few women physicians. She has often told, in her racy way, to young women physicians who were soon discouraged at a slow beginning, that for the first three weeks she did not have a one patient. But the tide turned."

Her first patient was a black servant named Tillie, who suffered from a uterine fibroid. Lacking access to a hospital, McLean operated in Tillie's home. Dr. Bishop provided a description of McLean's first major operation:

"The case was a uterine fibroid, in a colored woman, a former servant, who was finally persuaded to submit to the operation. Dr. McLean spent days sterilizing her own instruments and dressings, and preparing the woman’s house for the operation. She employed two trained nurses. All this at an outlay of some $250, her own expense. The operation was successful, but for some days afterwards Dr. McLean was in a great state of extreme anxiety....Tillie lived and recovered a well woman, and Dr. McLean was launched on a surgical career."

== Humanitarian work in Missouri ==
=== Evening Dispensary for Women ===
In 1893, McLean and another female physician named Ella Marx opened the Evening Dispensary for Women at 1607 Washington Avenue. The two provided medical advice and treatment to working women. They charged a small fee for those who could afford it, but most services were free.

=== Emmaus Home for Girls ===
In 1904, McLean opened the Emmaus Home for Girls with a group of women from local Protestant churches in response to the opening of the Louisiana Purchase Exposition that spring. Many rural women flocked to St. Louis to look for work and take part in the excitement of urban life. However, most earned less than five dollars per week for a ten-hour working day and suffered exploitation due to their lack of employment skills. This home was created in order to shelter female transients "from temptation in all forms."

The home remained open after the fair closed and affiliated with the Young Women's Christian Association (YWCA) in 1905, for which McLean served on the board of directors. She was especially concerned with these young girls' health and hygiene. McLean gave them physical examinations and uncovered many cases of heart disease and untreated rheumatic fever. Furthermore, she aided the organization in its construction of a gymnasium, sponsored instruction in posture and health, expanded the YWCA's programs into factories and department stores, and introduced sex education into a preventative health program.

=== Evening clinic ===
In 1908, McLean along with several younger female doctors created an evening clinic at 1900 Washington Avenue. The clinic is described as being "run by women, for women" and was open several nights per week in order to provide for the medical needs of working women.

== Missionary work in Asia ==
=== Missionary journey and medical service in China and Japan ===
In the early 1900s, McLean made several trips to China and Japan, where she operated in hospitals and studied Chinese medical education. She hoped to move there permanently but was forced to return to St. Louis after several months in Asia due to her poor health and the harsh climate. Once again, her colleague, Dr. Bishop, commented on her interest in learning more about this region and aiding the people who lived there:

"She made several trips to China and hoped to locate (there) permanently, but climatic conditions did not warrant this. However, in the months she spent in China she operated in many hospitals in cities where she had medical friends. She was always vitally interested in the education of the Chinese. Some twenty Chinese boys and girls owe their education and especially their medical education to Dr. McLean’s personal and financial support. Many of these during their years in school found a home in her home."

=== Return from missionary service ===
Although McLean only remained in Asia for a few months, she remained interested in aiding the people of that region. McLean was always devoted to aiding young women aspiring to become medical professionals. For example, she secured a teaching job for Bertha van Hoosen, whom she had met at the University of Michigan, in order to help her raise funds for medical school. This passion continued as she supported at least twenty Chinese and Japanese students through American medical schools. Many of them stayed in her home in St. Louis. One of her Chinese protégées, Dr. Li Yuin Tsao, became an intern for Van Hoosen once she had established a career in medicine in Chicago.

== Death and legacy ==
=== End of career ===
McLean broke her wrist in 1928, forcing her to end her surgical career. However, she continued to work in her private practice in obstetrics and gynecology until a few months before her death. She never married but lived with her sister at 4339 Delmar Boulevard. At this location, she also maintained a medical office from 1914 until her death. McLean died on May 17, 1930, aged 69, in St. Louis.

=== Legacy ===
McLean was considered a pioneer in St. Louis public health. Her commitment to providing for the health needs of working women is evident from her private practice in obstetrics and gynecology and creation of the Evening Dispensary for Women, Emmaus Home for Girls, and a free evening clinic. Her passion for social change and religious conviction motivated her to travel to China and Japan to continue her missionary work in that region and inspired others to do the same, such as her protégée, Bertha van Hoosen, who traveled from Canton to Peking and conducted medical operations along the way.

In addition, McLean made tremendous strides for women in the medical profession. She was the first woman to hold a position in the St. Louis city hospitals and the first female practitioner admitted to the St. Louis Medical Society. She used her influence in aiding young women, both American and Asian, in their medical careers as well.
