= Washington, Missouri =

City in the United States

- City
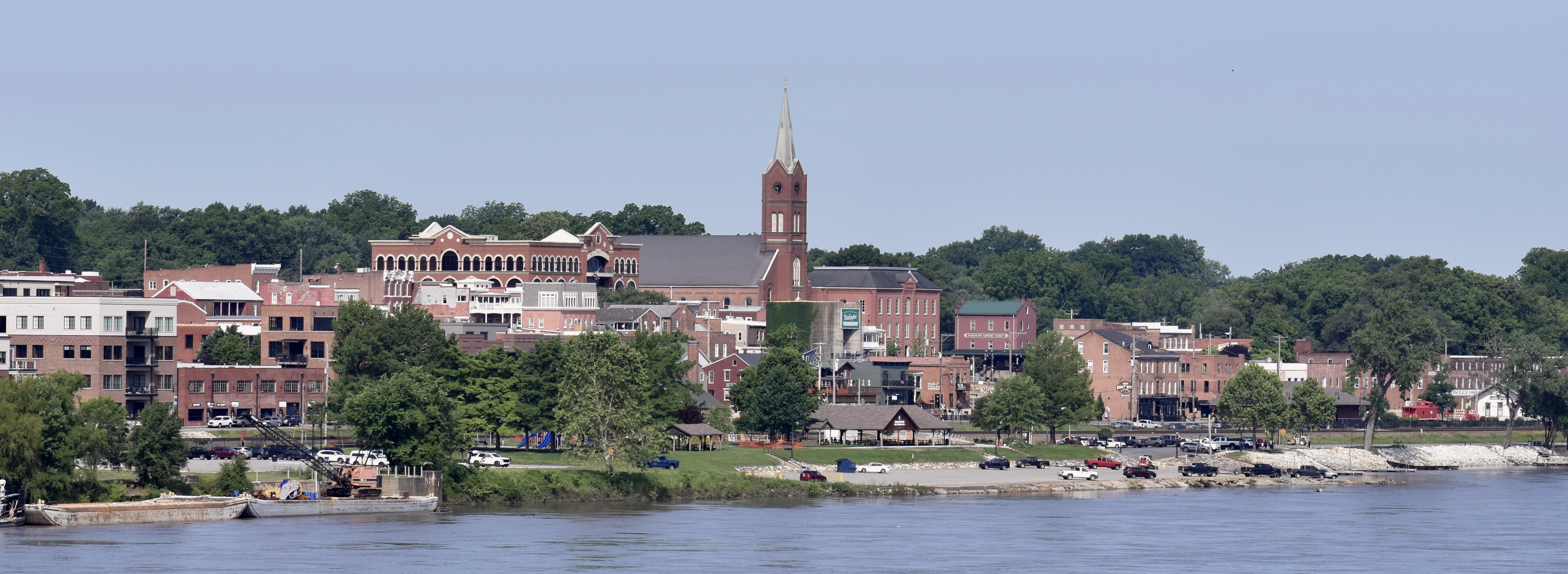
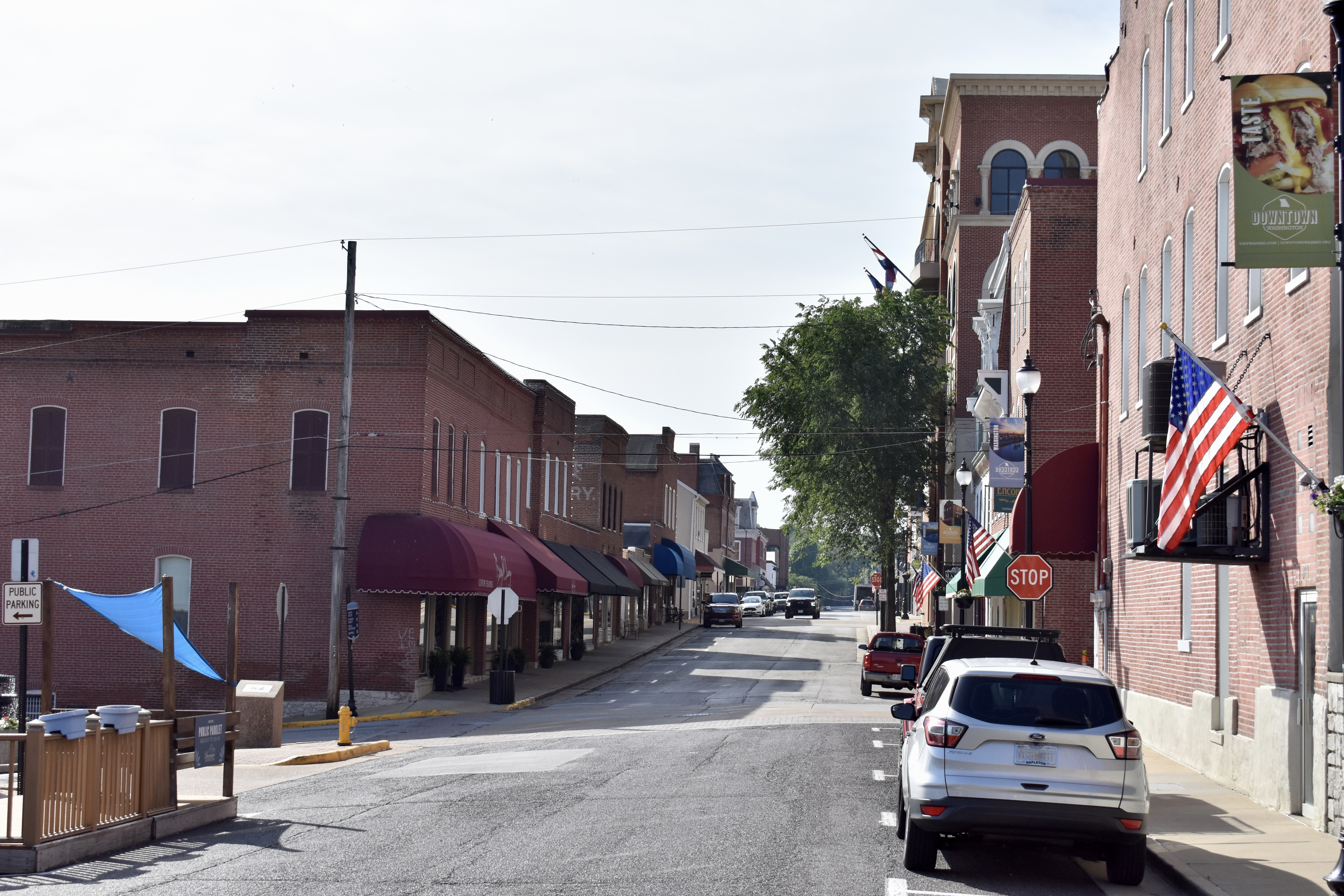
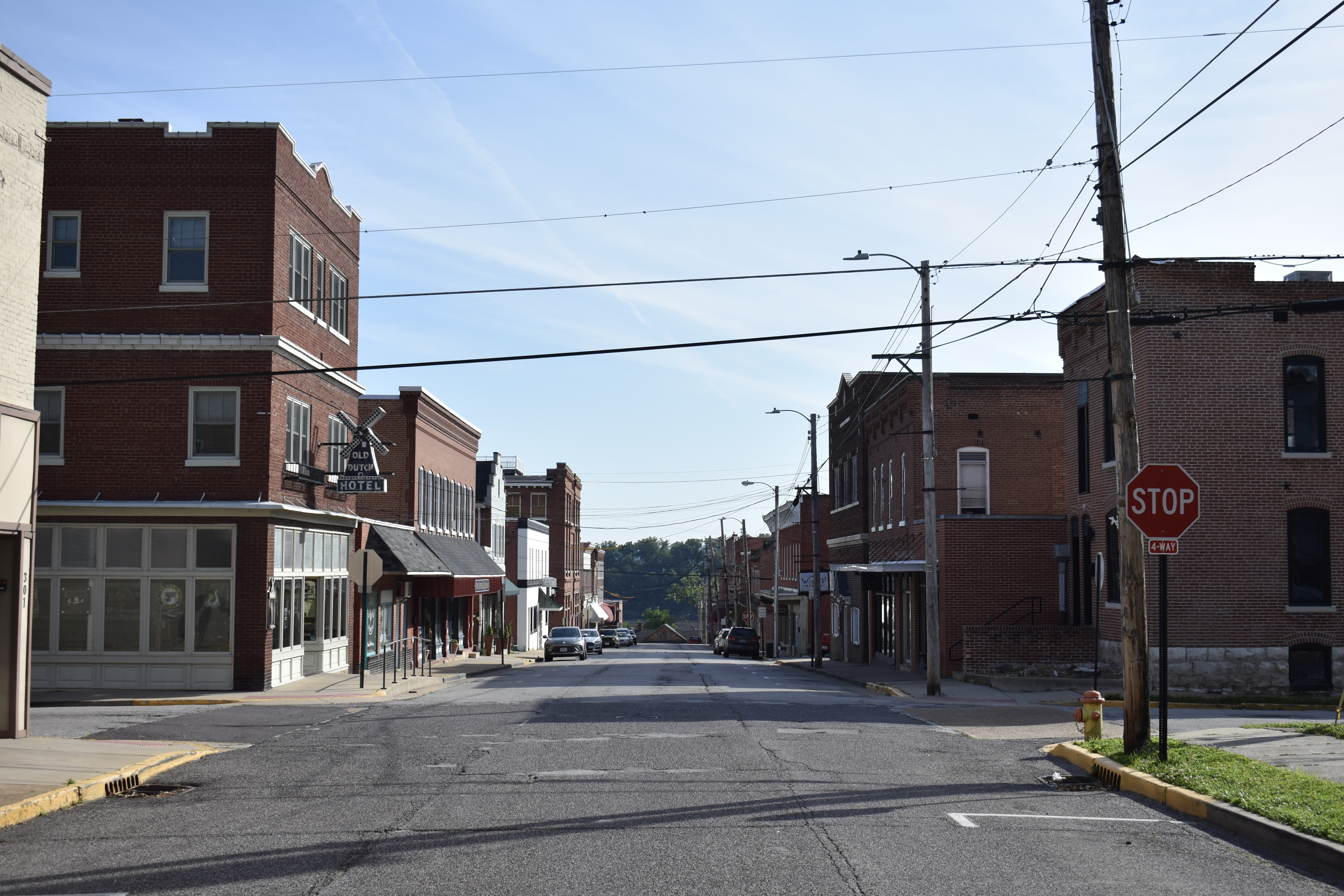
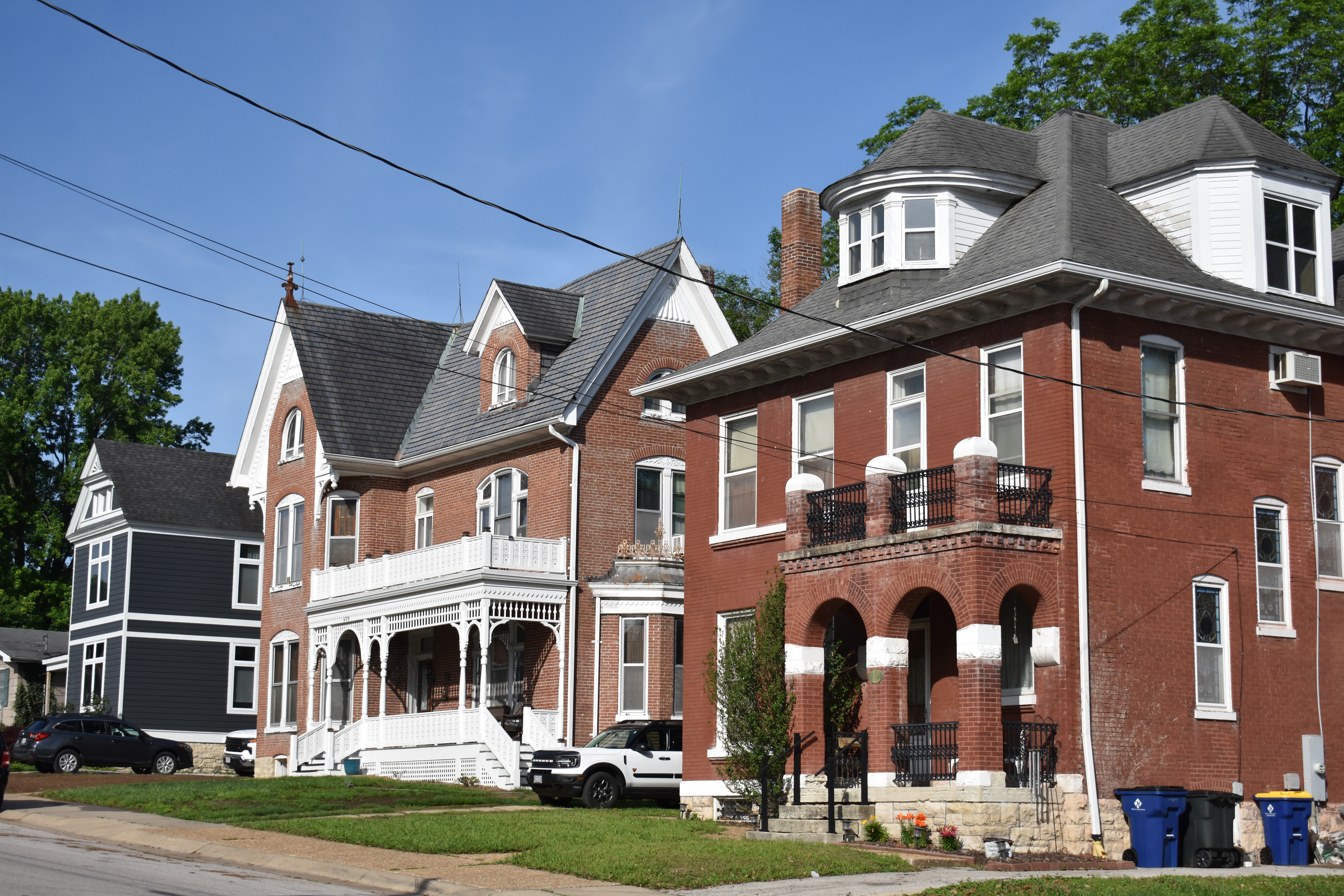
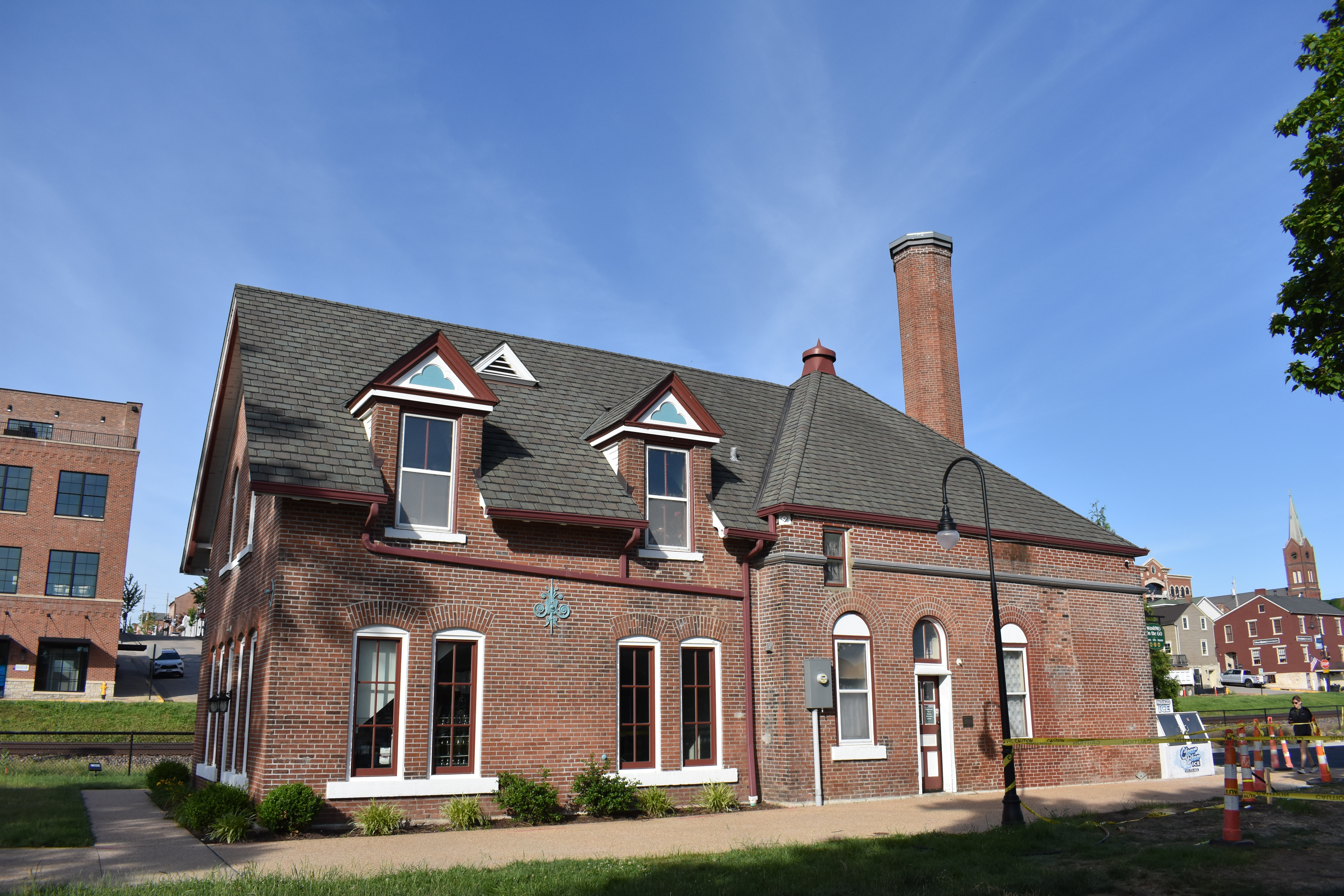
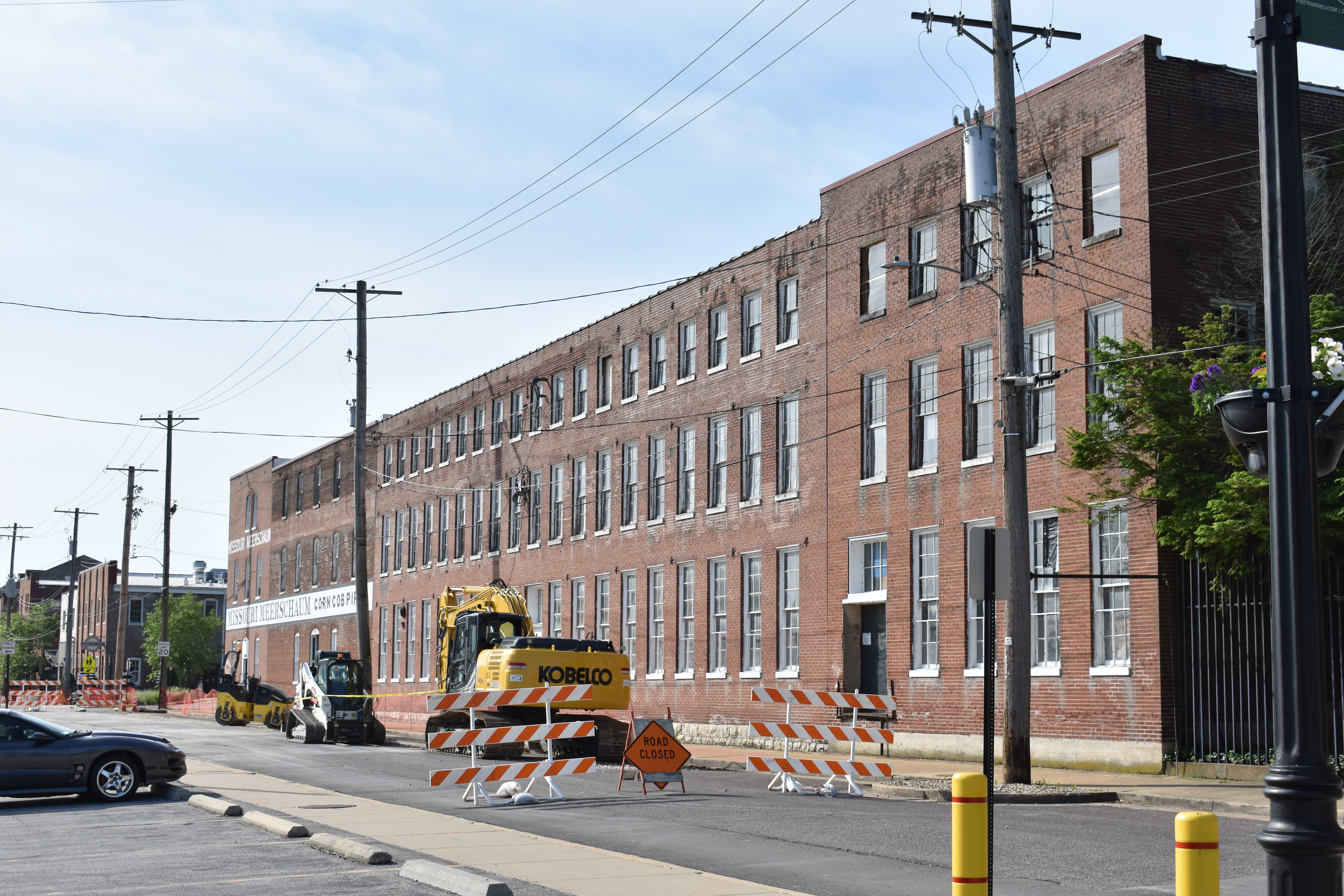
- Downtown Washington Main Street Elm Street Tibbe Historic District Waterworks Building Missouri Meerschaum

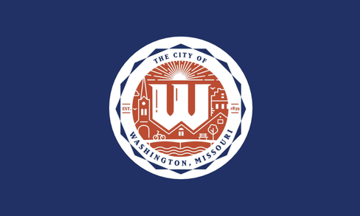
- Flag
- Nickname: Pipe City
- Location of Washington, Missouri
- Coordinates: 38°33′04″N 91°00′59″W
- Country: United States
- State: Missouri
- County: Franklin
- Named for: George Washington

Government
  - Mayor: James “Doug” Hagedorn

Area
  - Total: 10.16 sq mi (26.32 km^{2})
  - Land: 9.66 sq mi (25.02 km^{2})
  - Water: 0.50 sq mi (1.30 km^{2})
- Elevation: 558 ft (170 m)

Population (2020)
  - Total: 14,500
  - Estimate (July 1, 2022): 15,075
  - Density: 1,501/sq mi (579.5/km^{2})
- Time zone: UTC-6 (Central (CST))
  - Summer (DST): UTC-5 (CDT)
- ZIP code: 63090
- Area code: 636
- FIPS code: 29-77416
- GNIS feature ID: 2397208
- Website: City website

Washington is a city on the south banks of the Missouri River, 50 miles west of St. Louis, Missouri. It is considered an exurb of the Greater St. Louis area. As of the 2020 census, Washington had a population of 14,500. It is the largest city in Franklin County, Missouri. It is notable for being the "corncob pipe capital of the world," with the Missouri Meerschaum located on the city's riverfront.

== History ==
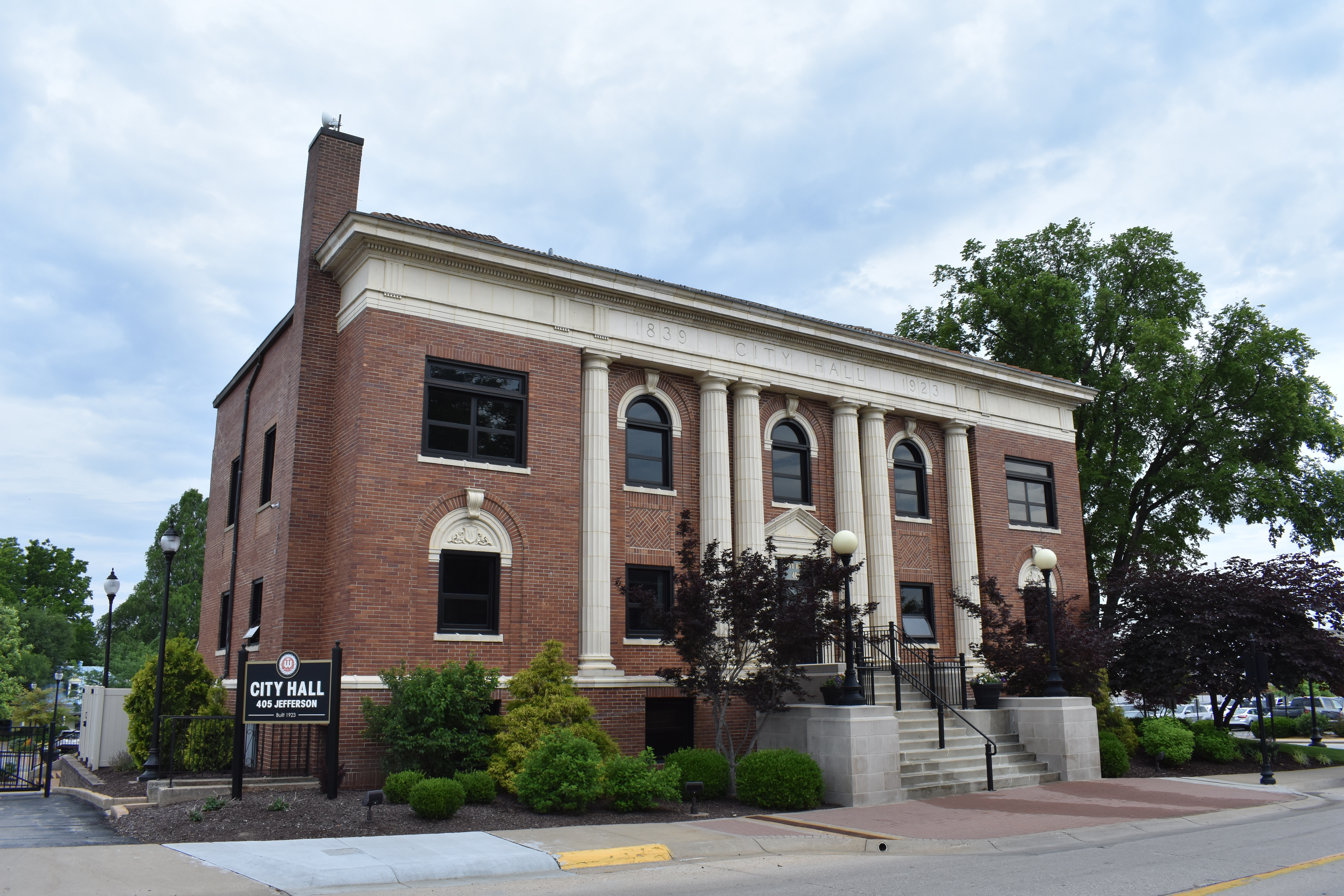
City Hall

Named after George Washington after it came under American control, the town was first settled during the rule of the Spanish Empire. It was originally called St. John Meyer's Settlement and was the site of the Spanish log fort San Juan del Misuri (1796–1803).

Family and followers of Daniel Boone settled the area across the river from Washington, Missouri starting in 1799. In 1814 a ferry boat was licensed for crossing the Missouri River to the north, and the settlement became known as Washington Landing. In 1827 a town was laid out, with sale of lots starting in 1829. The cost of land was waived if the buyer could build a substantial house within two years. This encouraged many new settlers.

Substantial numbers of anti-slavery German families started moving to the town in 1833, and they soon overwhelmed the existing population of slaveowners. However, many of the original slaveowners' homes still remain throughout the town. Washington became a strong supporter of the Union during the American Civil War. The town was ransacked by Confederate General Sterling Price's soldiers, but they were unable to keep control of the area.

After the war, Washington became a railroad and steamboat transportation center. Its manufacturing industry, while strong, is not as vibrant as it was decades ago.

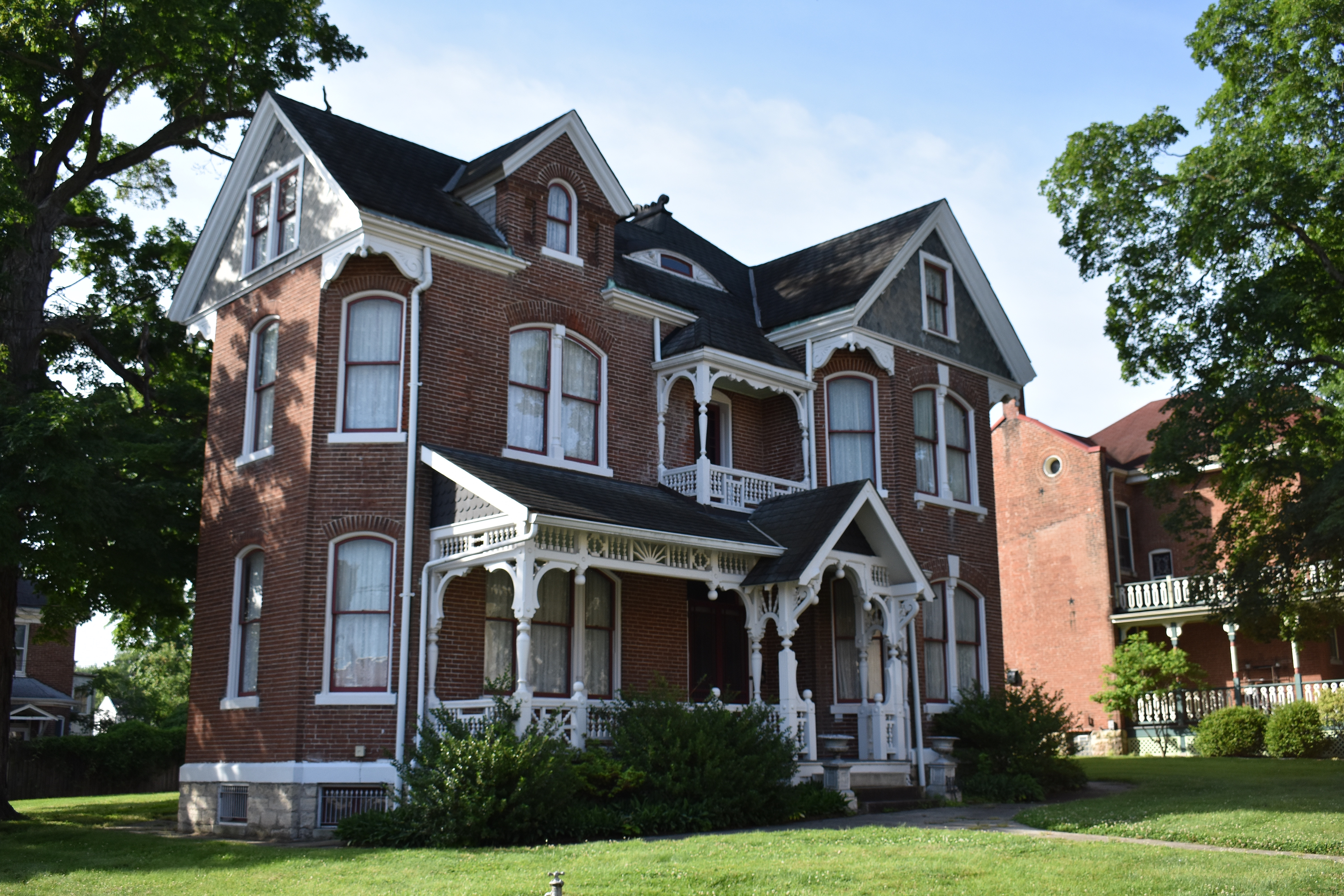
Henry C. Thias House

The town of Washington has 445 buildings on the National Register of Historic Places. Due to its historic charm, Washington has a growing heritage tourism industry, with visitors also attracted to the nearby Missouri Rhineland.

The Washington Bridge was constructed in 1934 and was the only bridge spanning the Missouri River in Franklin County. It was replaced with a new, wider bridge that was opened to traffic on December 3, 2018. The original bridge was demolished on April 13, 2019.

In 1988, the nation’s first Walmart Supercenter opened in Washington.

== Geography ==
According to the United States Census Bureau, the city has a total area of 9.87 square miles (25.56 km^{2}), of which 9.34 square miles (24.19 km^{2}) is land and 0.53 square miles (1.37 km^{2}) is water. The majority of annual precipitation falls during the humid springs and summers. Typically, fall and winter are relatively dry. While snow is not rare, it is not as frequent as in the upper Midwest. An average of 19 inches falls annually.

=== Climate ===
Climate data for Washington, Missouri, 1991–2020 normals, extremes 2009–present
| Month | Jan | Feb | Mar | Apr | May | Jun | Jul | Aug | Sep | Oct | Nov | Dec | Year |
|---|---|---|---|---|---|---|---|---|---|---|---|---|---|
| Record high °F (°C) | 73 (23) | 81 (27) | 91 (33) | 91 (33) | 95 (35) | 107 (42) | 105 (41) | 103 (39) | 100 (38) | 92 (33) | 85 (29) | 76 (24) | 107 (42) |
| Mean daily maximum °F (°C) | 39.9 (4.4) | 45.4 (7.4) | 55.8 (13.2) | 67.3 (19.6) | 75.8 (24.3) | 83.8 (28.8) | 88.3 (31.3) | 86.9 (30.5) | 79.5 (26.4) | 68.9 (20.5) | 55.3 (12.9) | 44.5 (6.9) | 66.0 (18.9) |
| Daily mean °F (°C) | 30.1 (−1.1) | 34.4 (1.3) | 44.0 (6.7) | 55.1 (12.8) | 65.0 (18.3) | 73.7 (23.2) | 77.6 (25.3) | 75.9 (24.4) | 67.7 (19.8) | 56.3 (13.5) | 44.0 (6.7) | 34.4 (1.3) | 54.9 (12.7) |
| Mean daily minimum °F (°C) | 20.2 (−6.6) | 23.4 (−4.8) | 32.1 (0.1) | 42.8 (6.0) | 54.2 (12.3) | 63.6 (17.6) | 67.0 (19.4) | 64.9 (18.3) | 55.9 (13.3) | 43.6 (6.4) | 32.8 (0.4) | 24.3 (−4.3) | 43.7 (6.5) |
| Record low °F (°C) | −21 (−29) | −11 (−24) | 1 (−17) | 24 (−4) | 34 (1) | 46 (8) | 51 (11) | 51 (11) | 36 (2) | 23 (−5) | 10 (−12) | −7 (−22) | −21 (−29) |
| Average precipitation inches (mm) | 2.52 (64) | 2.52 (64) | 3.66 (93) | 4.57 (116) | 5.30 (135) | 4.20 (107) | 4.19 (106) | 3.75 (95) | 3.71 (94) | 3.37 (86) | 3.67 (93) | 2.64 (67) | 44.10 (1,120) |
| Average snowfall inches (cm) | 2.6 (6.6) | 1.4 (3.6) | 0.7 (1.8) | 0.1 (0.25) | 0.0 (0.0) | 0.0 (0.0) | 0.0 (0.0) | 0.0 (0.0) | 0.0 (0.0) | 0.0 (0.0) | 0.4 (1.0) | 2.7 (6.9) | 7.9 (20.15) |
| Average precipitation days (≥ 0.01 in) | 7.8 | 8.1 | 10.8 | 11.0 | 12.5 | 10.1 | 8.3 | 7.9 | 7.5 | 8.7 | 8.4 | 8.0 | 109.1 |
| Average snowy days (≥ 0.1 in) | 1.8 | 1.4 | 0.4 | 0.0 | 0.0 | 0.0 | 0.0 | 0.0 | 0.0 | 0.0 | 0.3 | 1.4 | 5.3 |
Source 1: NOAA
Source 2: National Weather Service

== Demographics ==
Historical population
| Census | Pop. | Note | %± |
|---|---|---|---|
| 1880 | 2,421 | | — |
| 1890 | 2,725 | | 12.6% |
| 1900 | 3,015 | | 10.6% |
| 1910 | 3,670 | | 21.7% |
| 1920 | 3,132 | | −14.7% |
| 1930 | 5,918 | | 89.0% |
| 1940 | 6,756 | | 14.2% |
| 1950 | 6,850 | | 1.4% |
| 1960 | 7,961 | | 16.2% |
| 1970 | 8,499 | | 6.8% |
| 1980 | 9,251 | | 8.8% |
| 1990 | 10,704 | | 15.7% |
| 2000 | 13,243 | | 23.7% |
| 2010 | 13,982 | | 5.6% |
| 2020 | 14,500 | | 3.7% |
U.S. Decennial Census

=== 2020 census ===
As of the 2020 census, Washington had a population of 14,500. The median age was 42.1 years. 21.2% of residents were under the age of 18 and 21.3% of residents were 65 years of age or older. For every 100 females there were 91.2 males, and for every 100 females age 18 and over there were 89.2 males age 18 and over.

97.7% of residents lived in urban areas, while 2.3% lived in rural areas.

There were 6,149 households and 3,766 families in Washington, of which 27.0% had children under the age of 18 living in them. Of all households, 45.6% were married-couple households, 17.8% were households with a male householder and no spouse or partner present, and 29.1% were households with a female householder and no spouse or partner present. About 32.6% of all households were made up of individuals and 15.1% had someone living alone who was 65 years of age or older. The average household size was 2.4 and the average family size was 2.9.

There were 6,600 housing units, of which 6.8% were vacant. The homeowner vacancy rate was 1.7% and the rental vacancy rate was 8.1%.

Racial composition as of the 2020 census
| Race | Number | Percent |
|---|---|---|
| White | 13,370 | 92.2% |
| Black or African American | 89 | 0.6% |
| American Indian and Alaska Native | 32 | 0.2% |
| Asian | 114 | 0.8% |
| Native Hawaiian and Other Pacific Islander | 18 | 0.1% |
| Some other race | 143 | 1.0% |
| Two or more races | 734 | 5.1% |
| Hispanic or Latino (of any race) | 399 | 2.8% |

=== Income and poverty ===
The 2016–2020 5-year American Community Survey estimates show that the median household income was $66,779 (with a margin of error of +/- $6,377) and the median family income was $80,056 (+/- $4,419). Males had a median income of $44,859 (+/- $4,169) versus $33,981 (+/- $2,766) for females. The median income for those above 16 years old was $36,920 (+/- $1,560). Approximately, 5.0% of families and 6.5% of the population were below the poverty line, including 13.0% of those under the age of 18 and 4.5% of those ages 65 or over.

=== 2010 census ===
As of the census of 2010, there were 13,982 people, 5,863 households, and 3,665 families living in the city. The population density was 1,497.0 inhabitants per square mile (578.0/km^{2}). There were 6,319 housing units at an average density of 676.6 per square mile (261.2/km^{2}). The racial makeup of the city was 96.7% White, 0.7% African American, 0.1% Native American, 0.5% Asian, 0.1% Pacific Islander, 0.7% from other races, and 1.2% from two or more races. Hispanic or Latino of any race were 2.1% of the population.

There were 5,863 households, of which 31.3% had children under the age of 18 living with them, 48.3% were married couples living together, 10.1% had a female householder with no husband present, 4.0% had a male householder with no wife present, and 37.5% were non-families. 31.9% of all households were made up of individuals, and 14% had someone living alone who was 65 years of age or older. The average household size was 2.35 and the average family size was 2.97.

The median age in the city was 39.4 years. 24.1% of residents were under the age of 18; 8.1% were between the ages of 18 and 24; 24.8% were from 25 to 44; 26.1% were from 45 to 64; and 17% were 65 years of age or older. The gender makeup of the city was 47.8% male and 52.2% female.

=== 2000 census ===
As of the census of 2000, there were 13,243 people, 5,258 households, and 3,501 families living in the city. The population density was 1,548.9 inhabitants per square mile (598.0/km^{2}). There were 5,565 housing units at an average density of 650.9 per square mile (251.3/km^{2}). The racial makeup of the city was 97.76% White, 0.85% African American, 0.13% Native American, 0.42% Asian, 0.23% from other races, and 0.63% from two or more races. Hispanic or Latino of any race were 0.66% of the population.

There were 5,258 households, out of which 32.7% had children under the age of 18 living with them, 53.7% were married couples living together, 9.1% had a female householder with no husband present, and 33.4% were non-families. 28.4% of all households were made up of individuals, and 12.2% had someone living alone who was 65 years of age or older. The average household size was 2.46 and the average family size was .

In the city, the population was spread out, with 25.7% under the age of 18, 8.7% from 18 to 24, 30.3% from 25 to 44, 19.4% from 45 to 64, and 16.0% who were 65 years of age or older. The median age was 36 years. For every 100 females, there were 91.5 males. For every 100 females age 18 and over, there were 88.7 males.

The median income for a household in the city was $43,417, and the median income for a family was $52,433. Males had a median income of $36,163 versus $23,666 for females. The per capita income for the city was $22,360. About 3.0% of families and 5.0% of the population were below the poverty line, including 4.1% of those under age 18 and 4.7% of those age 65 or over.

== Education ==
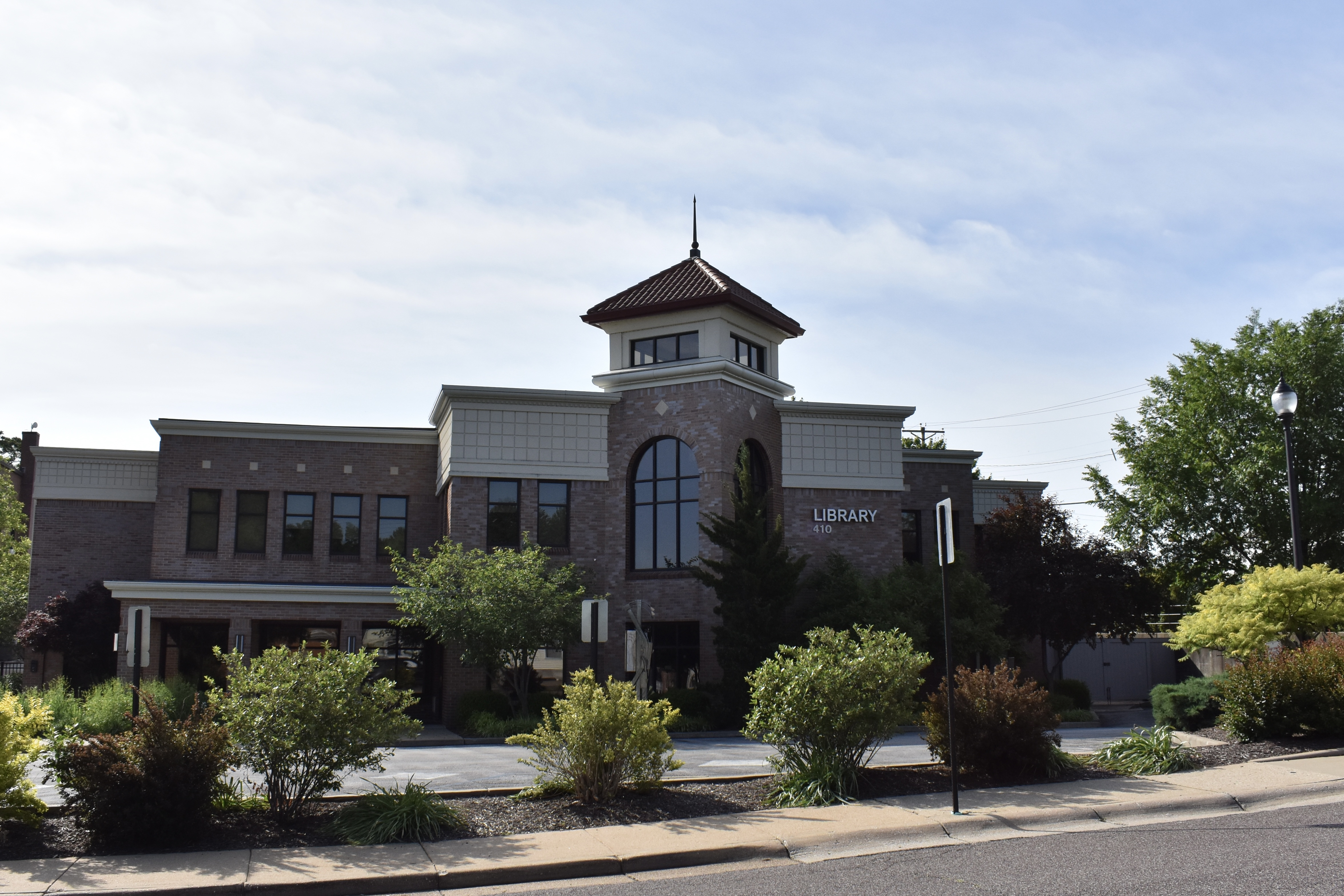
Washington Public Library

The School District of Washington operates public schools in the city. Washington High School is the local high school.

Private schools in the city include:

- St. Francis Borgia High School
- St. Francis Borgia Grade School (PK-8)
- Our Lady of Lourdes Grade School (PK-8)
- Immanuel Lutheran School (PK-8)

Washington has a public library, a branch of the Scenic Regional Library system.

== Sister city ==
In 1990 Marbach am Neckar (Germany) became the sister city of Washington. Student exchanges and visitations between the two cities occur occasionally.

== Notable people ==
- Dr. Mary Hancock McLean, First woman admitted to the St. Louis Medical Society
- James L. Miller Sr., Founder of the Washington Missourian newspaper, Missouri Press Association's Hall of Fame inductee
- Brock Olivo, Former NFL player, Missouri football special teams analyst
- Matt Pickens, Former professional soccer player
- Bruce Sassmann, Missouri House Representative 61st & 62nd Districts
- Kim Spalding, Film, television, and theatre actor
- Jack Wagner, Emmy Award-nominated American actor
- Christopher Voss, Emmy Award-winning television producer
