= Missouri Meerschaum =

American corn cob pipe manufacturer

Missouri Meerschaum Company
- Company type: Private
- Industry: Pipe smoking
- Founded: 1869
- Headquarters: Washington, Missouri, United States of America
- Key people: Henry Tibbe
- Products: Tobacciana
- Website: https://corncobpipe.com/

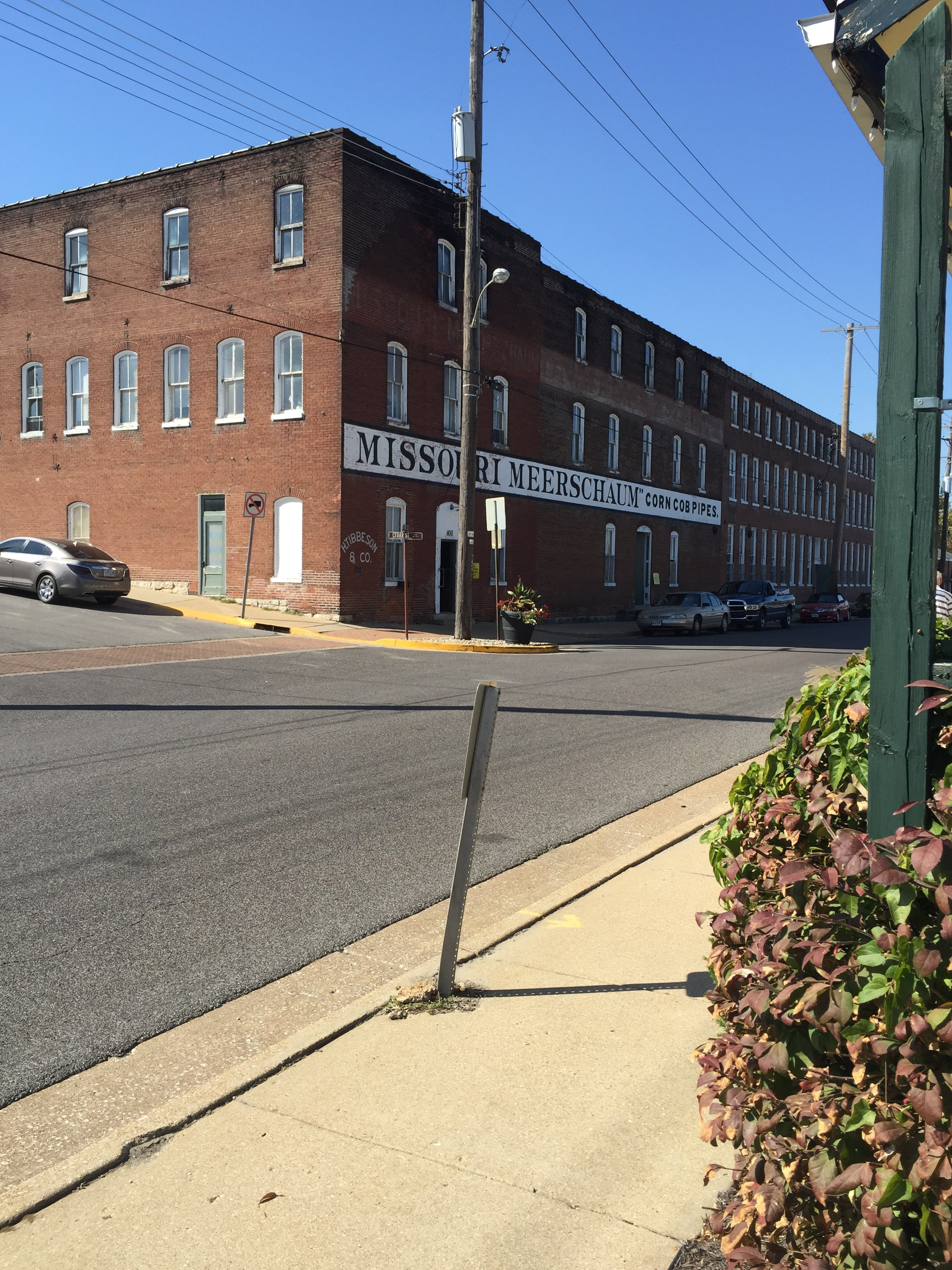

The Missouri Meerschaum Company is a tobacco smoking pipe manufacturer located in Washington, Missouri. It is the world's oldest and largest manufacturer of corncob pipes.

The company was founded in 1869 when Dutch-American woodworker Henry Tibbe began producing corncob pipes and selling them in his shop. Tibbes likened the pipes to meerschaum pipes and thus named them "Missouri Meerschaum." In 1878 Tibbe patented his method of fireproofing the pipes by applying a plaster-like substance to the outside of the cob. In 1883 Tibbe and his son Anton applied for a U.S. Patent to trademark their Missouri Meerschaum pipe. In 1907 H. Tibbe & Son Co. became the Missouri Meerschaum Company.

The Missouri Meerschaum Company's factory currently produces 3,500 pipes per day and ships these pipes to every U.S. state and several foreign countries.

== See also ==
- Peterson Pipes
- Savinelli Pipes
