= Savinelli Pipes =

Italian pipe maker

- Trade name: Savinelli S.R.L.
- Company type: Private
- Industry: Pipe smoking
- Founded: 1876
- Headquarters: Milan, Italy
- Key people: Achille Savinelli
- Products: Tobacciana
- Website: www.savinelli.it

Savinelli Pipes is an Italian smoking pipe maker headquartered in Milan and founded in 1876. The company makes machine and carved pipes, and is recognized for its craftsmanship.

== History ==
Savinelli is an Italian brand with a history dating back to 1876. Founded in Milan by the Savinelli family, the company initially specialized in selling pipes and tobacco near the Piazza del Duomo.

In the post-World War II era, Achille Savinelli expanded the company’s operations. He established a manufacturing facility in Barasso, near the scenic Varese Lake. Despite this growth, the original shop in Milan has remained open since its founding.

== See also ==
- Missouri Meerschaum
- Peterson Pipes
