= Tibbe Historic District =

Historic district in Missouri, United States

- U.S. National Register of Historic Places
- U.S. Historic district
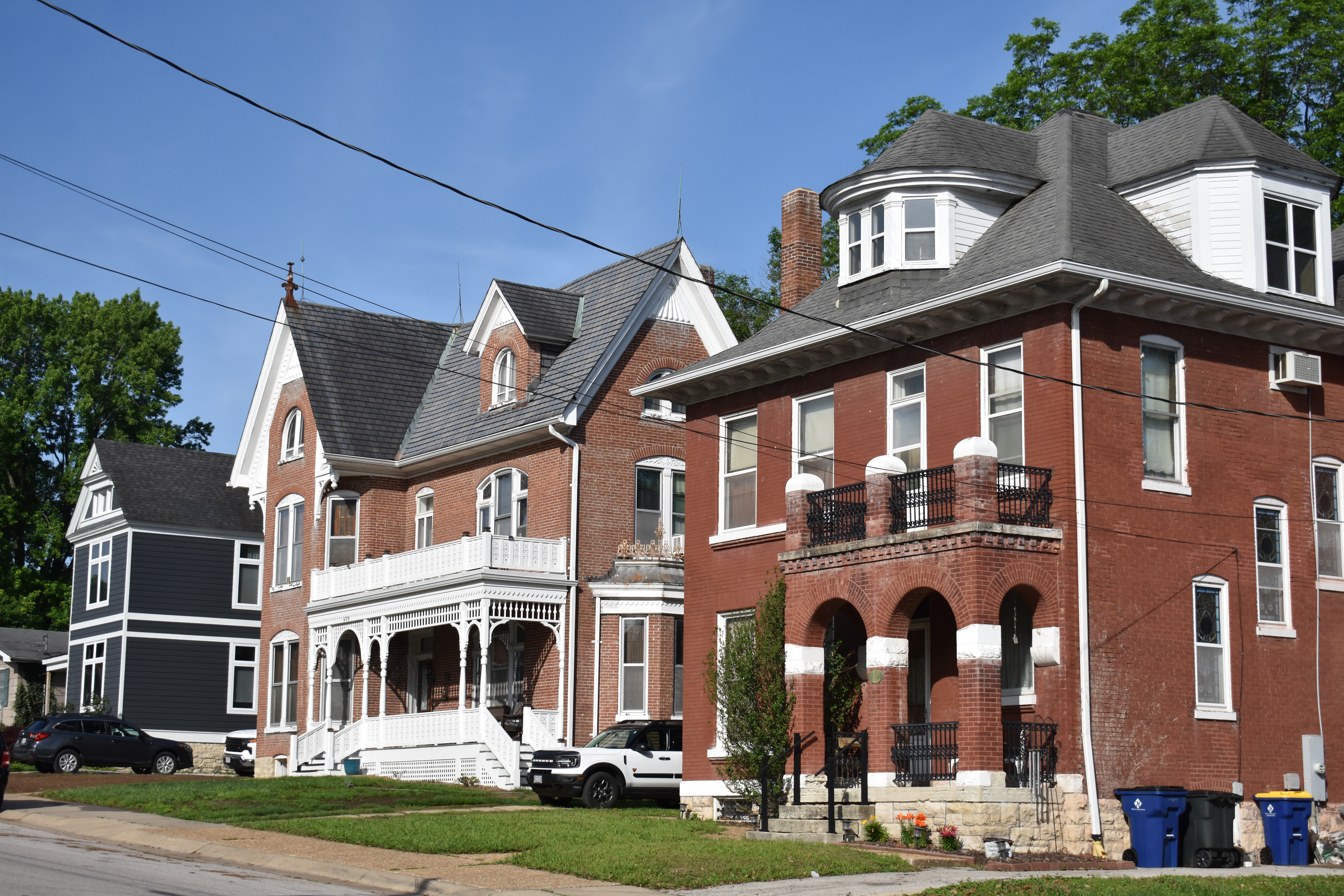
- Tibbe Historic District, May 2026

- Location within Missouri Location within the United States
- Location: Bounded by Front, Market, Main, Lafayette, Second, Oak, Fifth, Cedar, Main, and Olive, Washington, Missouri
- Coordinates: 38°33′32″N 91°0′57″W
- Area: 9.2 acres (3.7 ha)
- Architect: Busch, Ulrich W.; Helfenstellar, Hirsch & Watson
- Architectural style: Colonial Revival, Bungalow/craftsman, Queen Anne
- NRHP reference No.: 90000501
- Added to NRHP: March 22, 1990

Tibbe Historic District, also known as the Lustigestrumpf (Fancy Stocking) Historic District, is a national historic district located at Washington, Franklin County, Missouri. The district encompasses 23 contributing buildings in a predominantly residential section of Washington. The district developed between about 1857 and 1941, and includes representative examples of Queen Anne, Colonial Revival, and Bungalow / American Craftsman style residential architecture.

It was listed on the National Register of Historic Places in 1990.

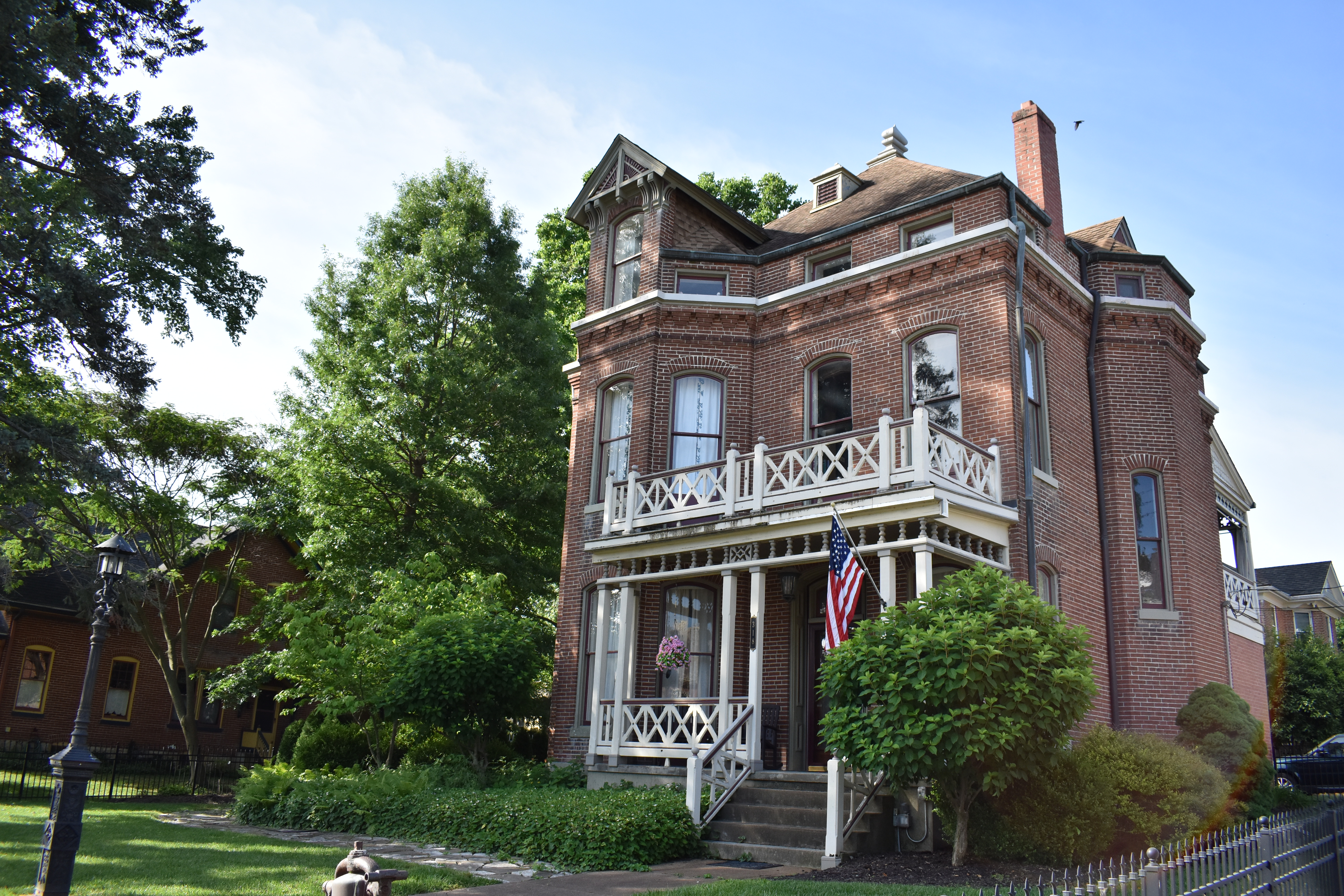
Tibbe House
