= Pipe tool =

Gadget for use with a tobacco pipe

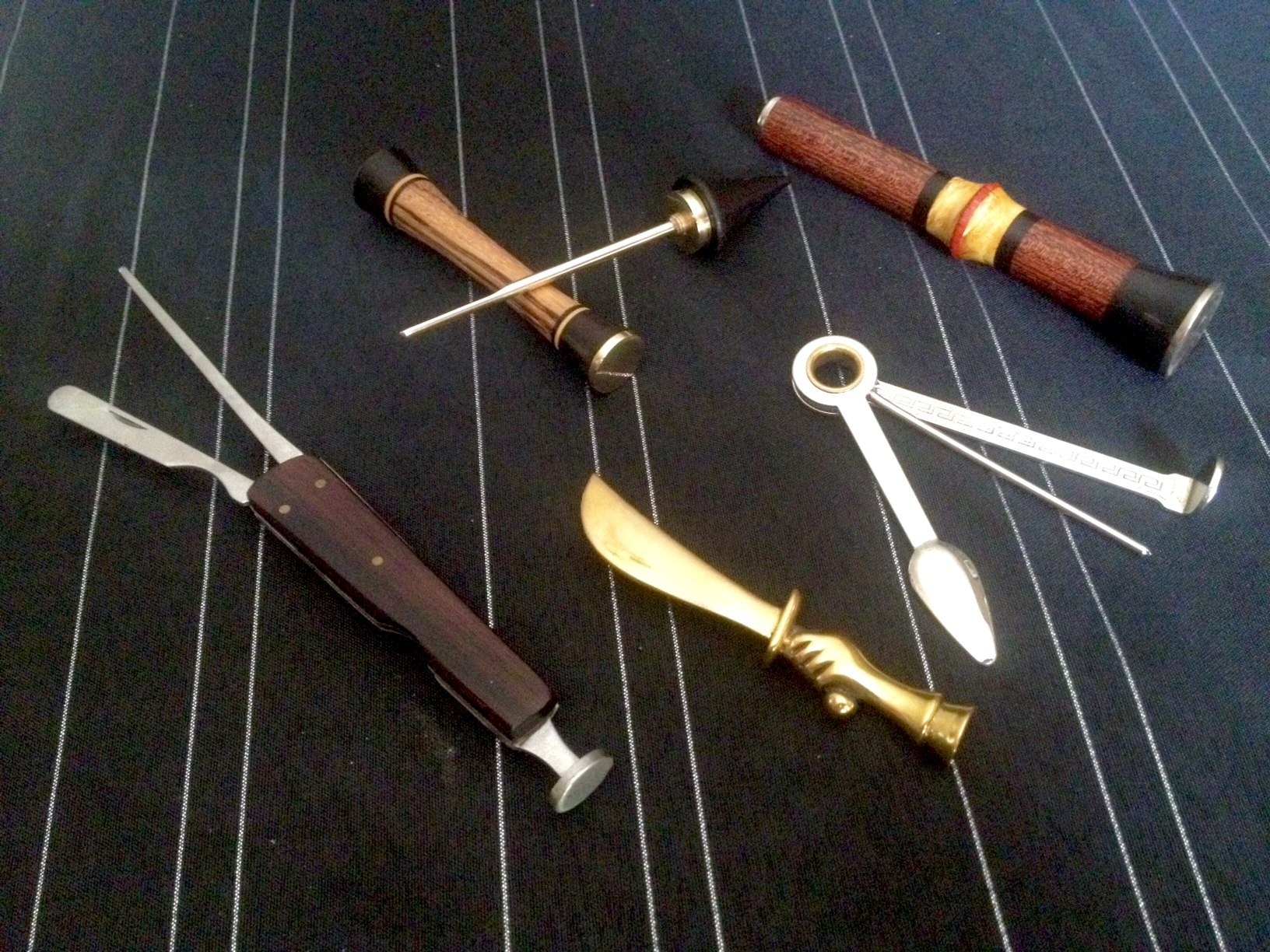
From left: pipe knife, tamper with pick, tamper with reamer in the form of a sword, Czech tool, tamper

A pipe tool is a small gadget designed to aid in packing, smoking, and emptying a tobacco pipe.

There are three principal pipe tools: the tamper, the reamer, and the pick:

- The tamper is a blunt instrument, either a simple dowel or shaped like the head of a nail. The flat end is used to tamp down the tobacco while packing the pipe, and to crush the ash together during smoking or relighting. Tampers are often made with a notch or small holes to permit airflow so that tamping the tobacco does not extinguish the flame.
- The reamer or scoop is a flat instrument shaped like a dull knife blade or a flattened spoon, used to scrape ash and unburned tobacco (dottle) off the sides and bottom of a pipe.
- The pick or poker is a narrow rod or pin that can be used to clear the shank of debris or aerate tightly packed tobacco. Because it is sharp, it may scratch the bowl of a pipe and so should not be used for scraping.

These three tools can be combined in different ways. Most common is the three-in-one Czech tool, which consists of a tamper, reamer and pick joined together. A pipe knife is another three-in-one tool: the reamer and pick fold into the casing in the same fashion as a pocketknife, while the blunt end is used as a tamper. A pipe nail is a nail-shaped tool with a tamper at one end and a reamer at the other. Tampers and reamers are also made as separate tools.

== Gallery ==
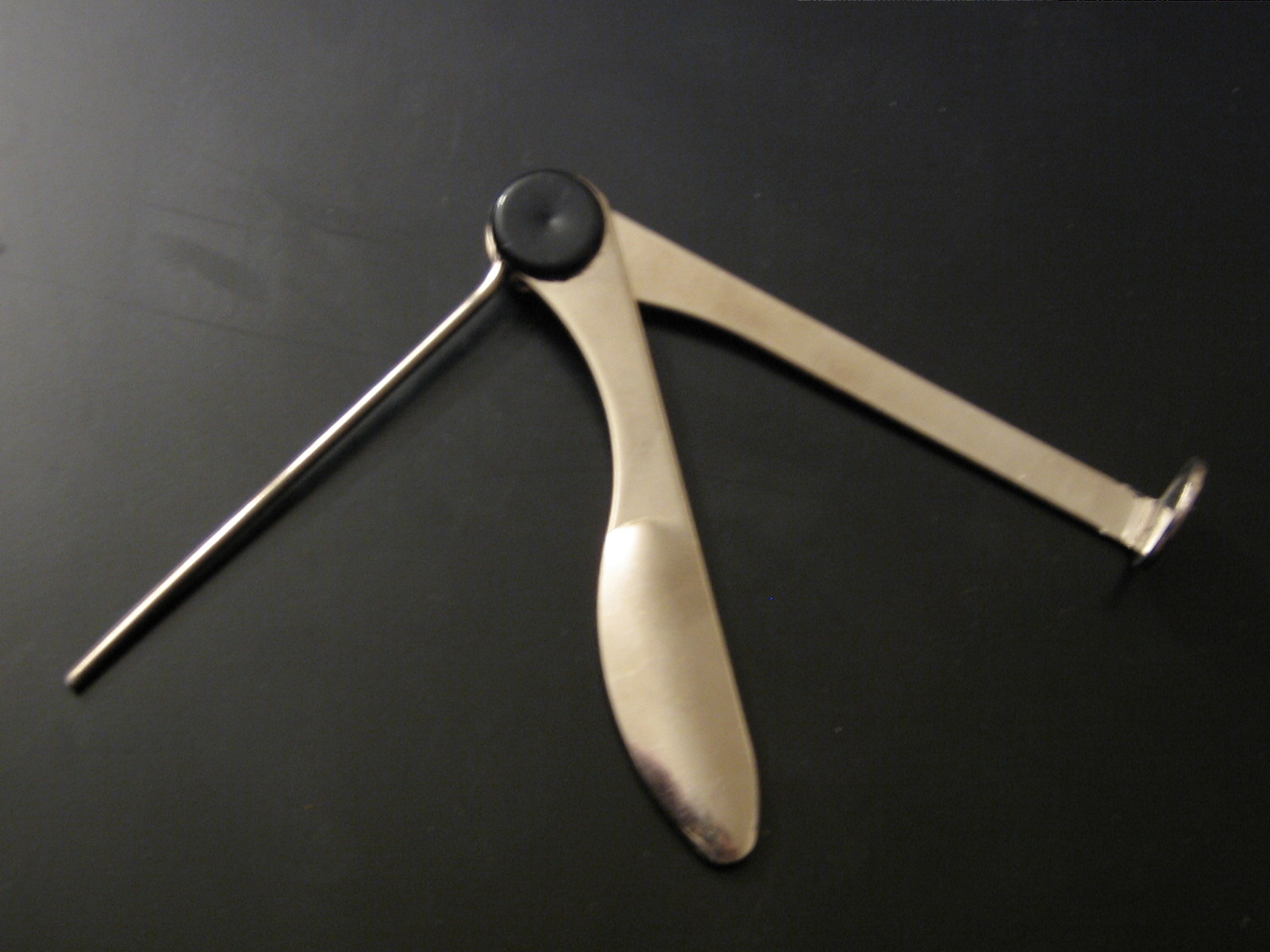
Czech tool showing from left to right a pick, reamer, and tamper

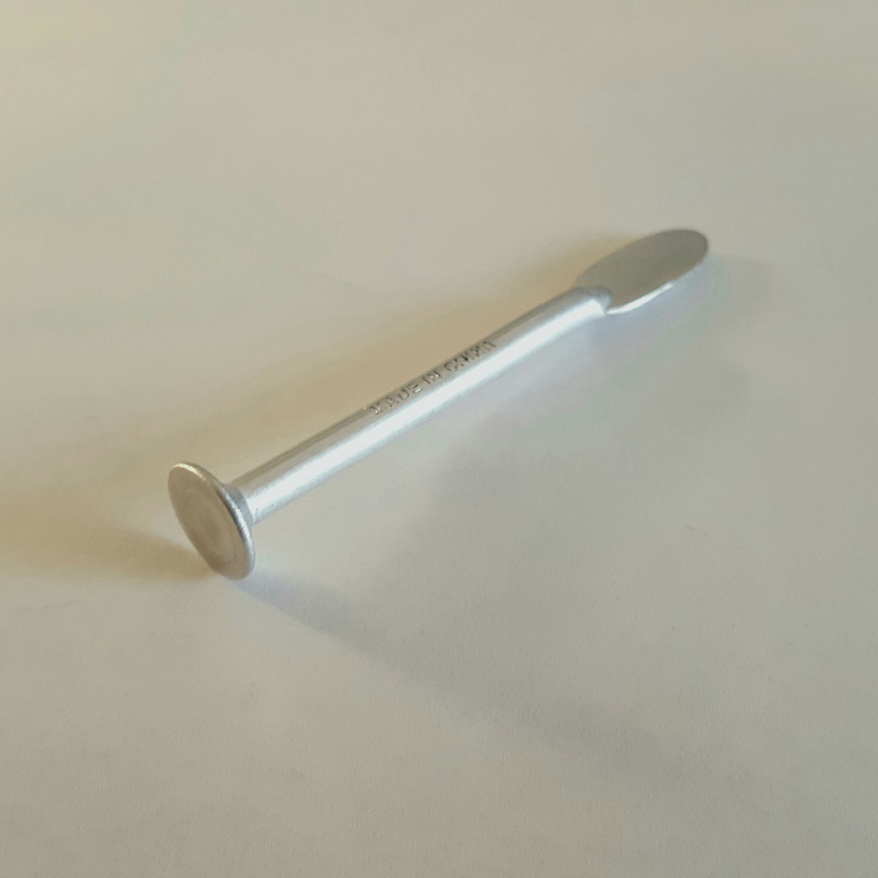
Aluminum pipe nail

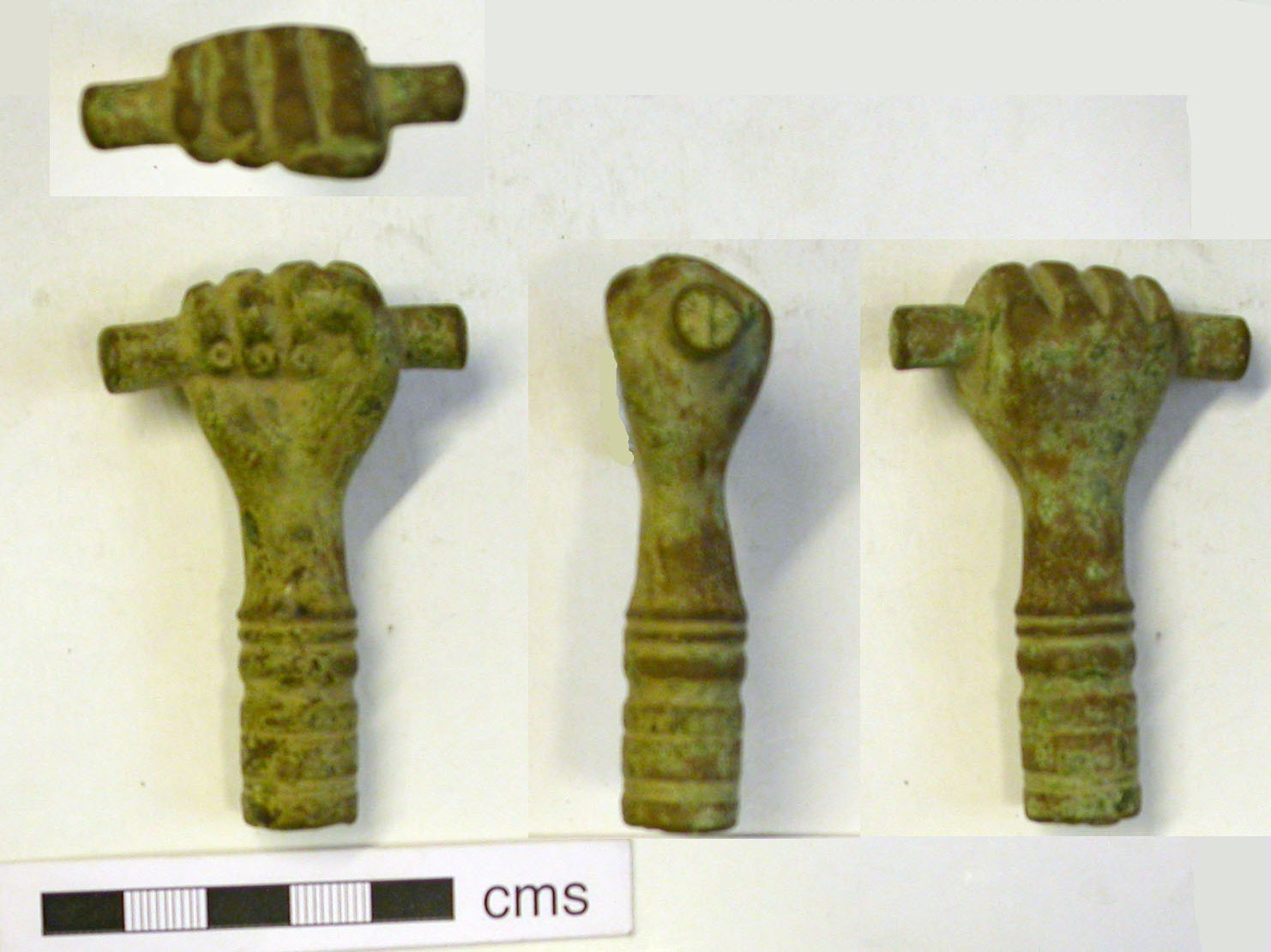
Early modern pipe tamper in the form of an arm

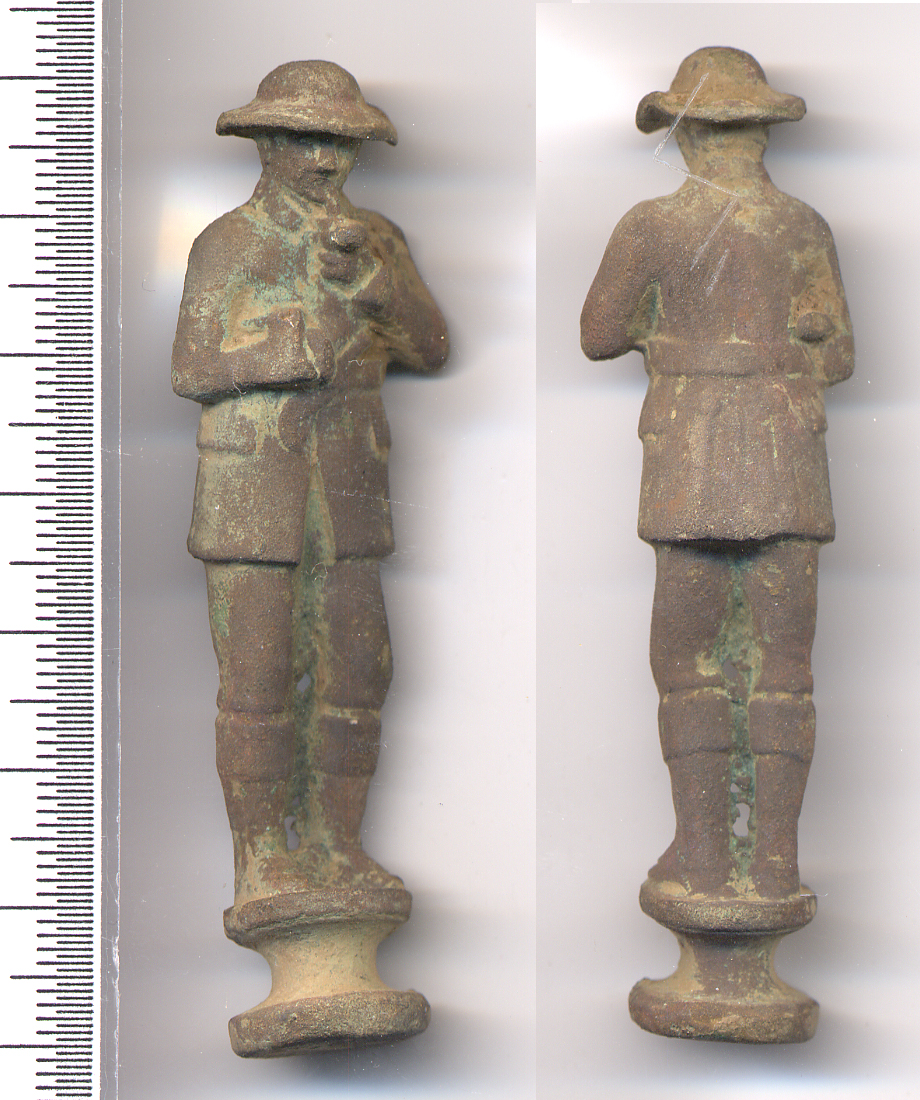
Early twentieth-century pipe tamper depicting a soldier in uniform smoking
