= Kubur =

Firearm of the Ottoman Empire and Balkans

- Albanian "Rat Tail" Kubur
- Type: Muzzleloading Pistol

Service history
- In service: 16th century to 1870's (Military) until early 20th century (Irregulars)
- Used by: Ottoman Empire
- Wars: Nearly every Ottoman war from the 16th to 20th century

Production history
- Produced: 16th to mid 19th century

Specifications
- Barrel length: 20–36 cm (8–14 in)
- Caliber: .50–.70
- Action: Miquelet Lock, Flintlock or Percussion

The Kubur was a type of muzzleloading pistol produced and used throughout the Ottoman Empire. It is a general term, referring to a common form of holster pistol, though more specific types were often named for their region of manufacture or distinctive design features.

== Design and features ==
Kubur pistols share a common overall form but exhibit significant regional variation in decoration, lock type, and stock design.

Action: The most common lock mechanism was the robust Miquelet lock, prized for its reliability. However, examples with conventional flintlock mechanisms and later percussion locks are also frequently encountered.

Stock: Stocks were typically made from walnut or other hardwoods and could be either partially or fully covered in metal, most often silver or brass, which was often intricately engraved or chiseled.

Barrel: Barrels were usually long, smoothbore imported from Italy, Germany, France but some were locally made.

== Regional and typological variations ==
While "Kubur" serves as a general term, more specific names were often applied to denote a pistol's purported origin or distinctive style.

Regionally Named Types: Many pistols were named after the towns or regions they were associated with. Examples include the Skadarke (from Shkodër, modern Albania), the Pećanka (from Peć, modern Kosovo) etc.

Design-Based Types: Some varieties were named for their aesthetic characteristics. The Ledenica (meaning "icicle"), for instance, was a type stocked entirely in silver. Another distinct type, characterized by a "rat-tail" butt and a stock made of engraved brass, is primarily attributed to gunsmiths in central Albania, particularly the city of Elbasan.

== Use ==
The Kubur was a ubiquitous sidearm across the Ottoman Empire for centuries carried by military officers, cavalrymen, militias, and civilians for personal protection. They were carried on horseback or on foot in holsters such as the multi-compartment Silahlik belts, purpose-made paired holsters known as kuburluk, single gun holsters, or sometimes stuffed into a sash. As a valuable personal item, it was often highly decorated, serving as a status symbol as well as a weapon.

By 1883, a flintlock/miquelet Kubur in Serbia cost 4 dinars, percussion pistols were 8-24 dinars, while revolvers cost 27-72 dinars. For comparison, a well-fed pig at that time was worth 24 dinars, while a teacher's monthly salary was 108 dinars.

Kubura Pećanka were carried by some of the leaders within Green Cadres during world war one although this was mostly symbolic.

== Gallery ==
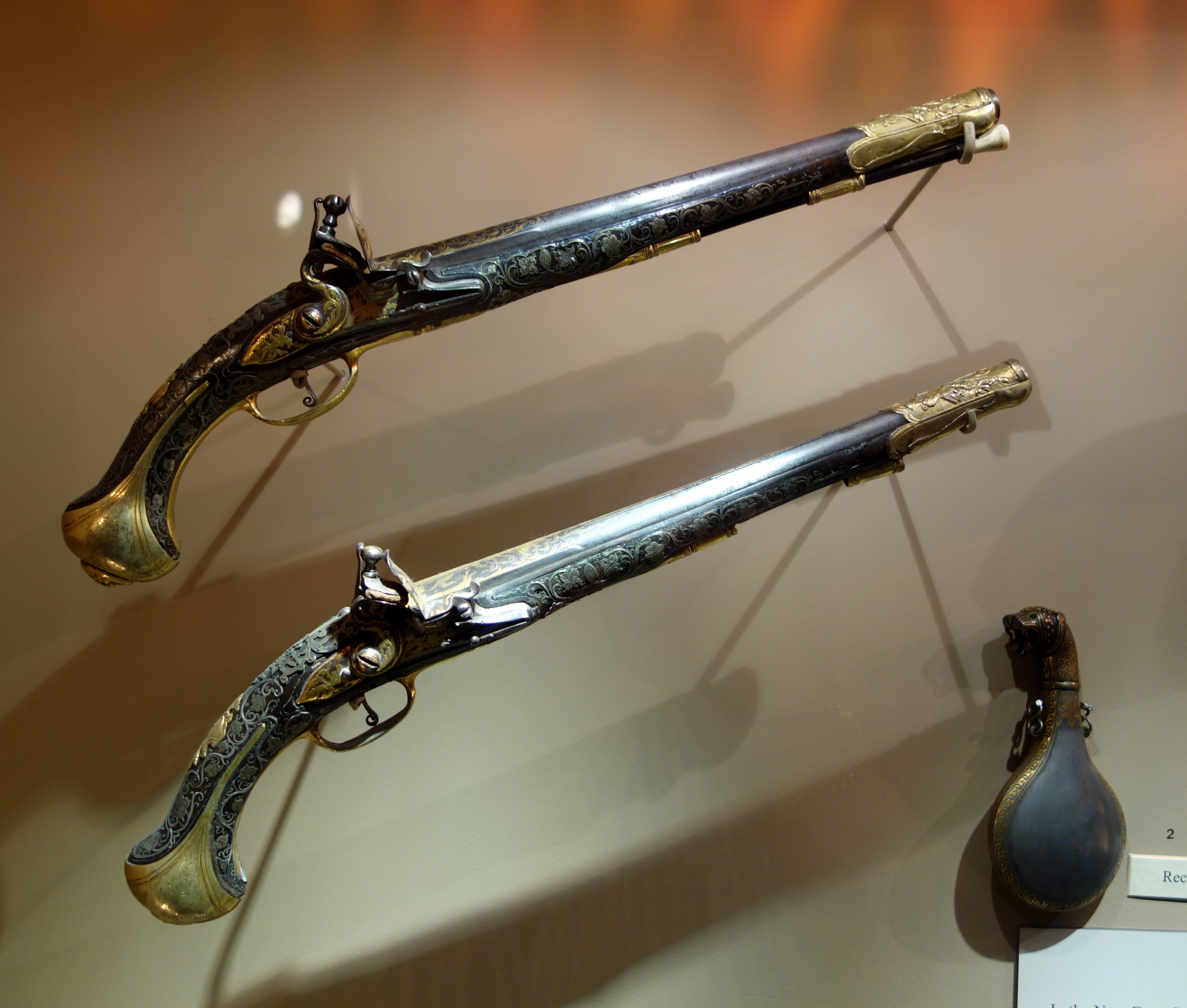
Flintlock Kubur Pistols

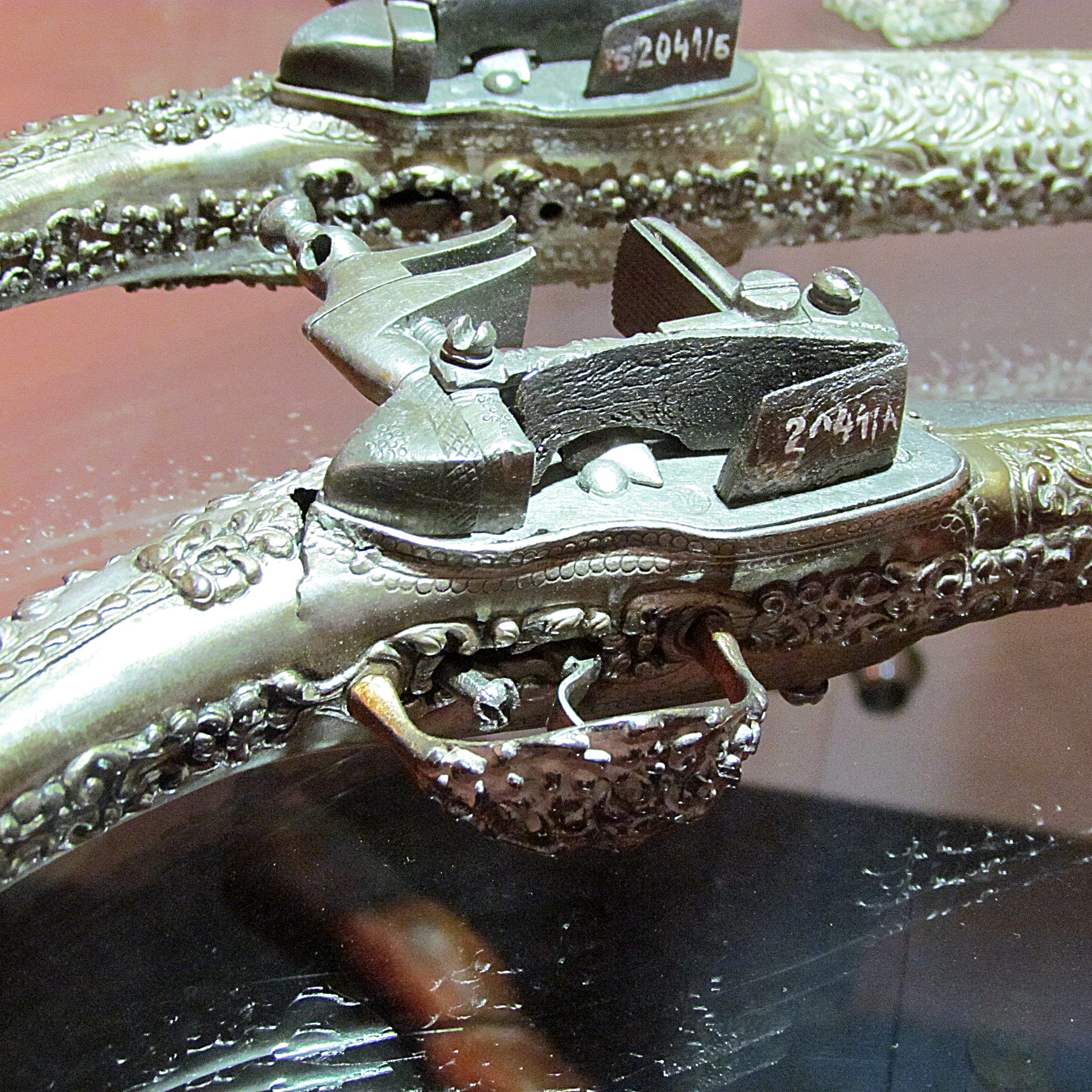
Cloesup of Lendenica Pistols

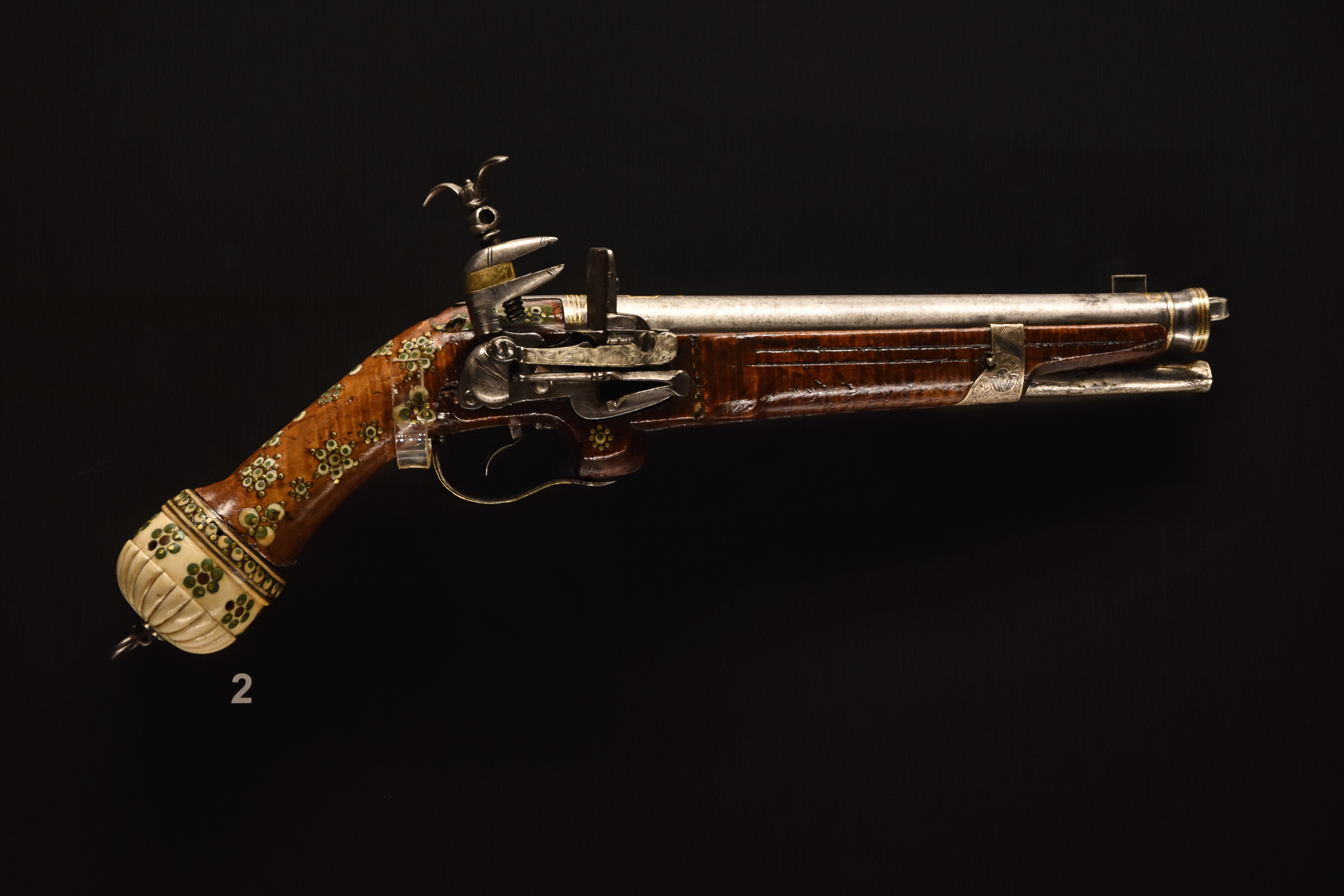
17th Century Kubur

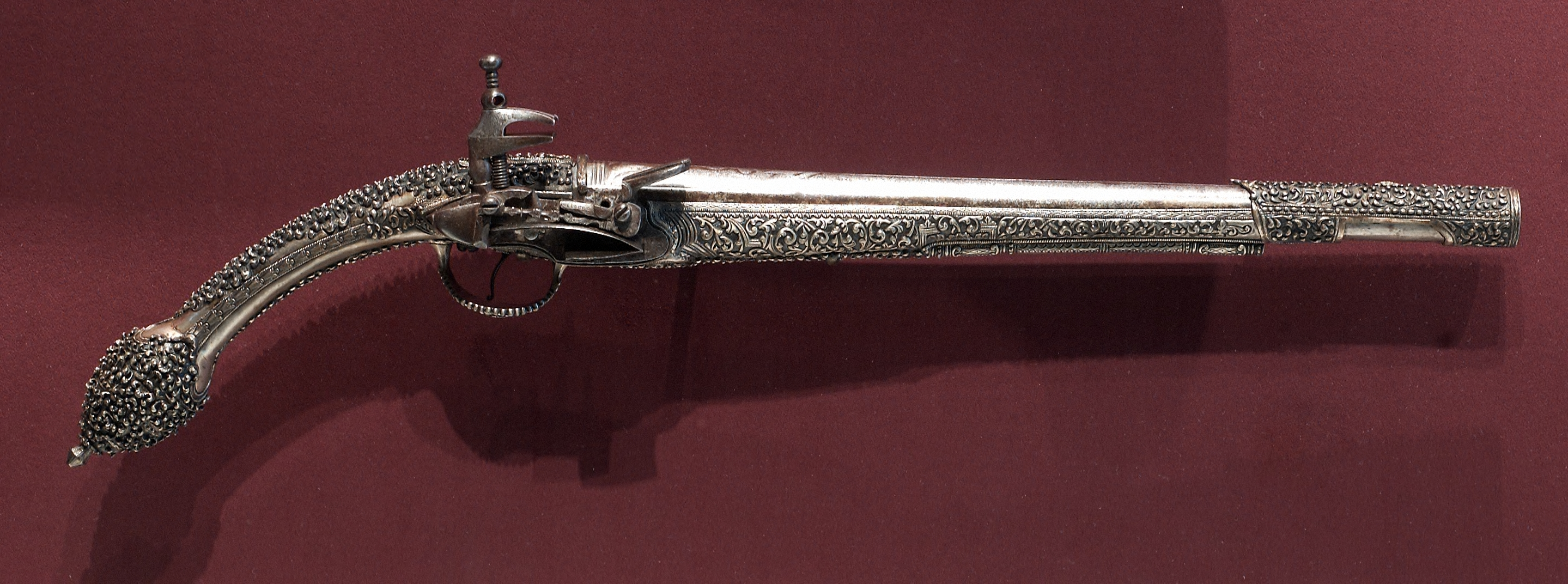
Ledenica

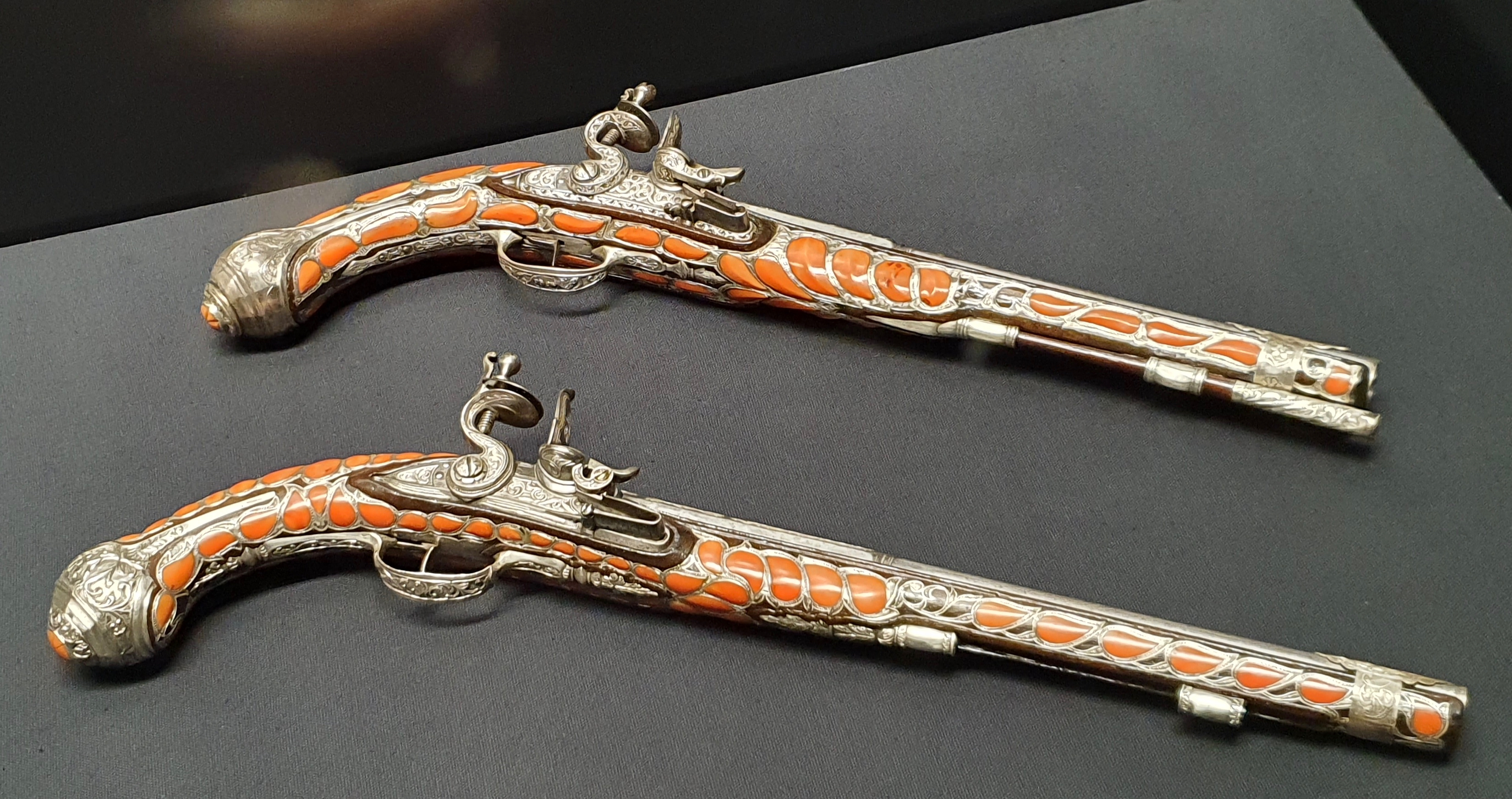
Pair of coral adorned Algerian Kubur Pistols

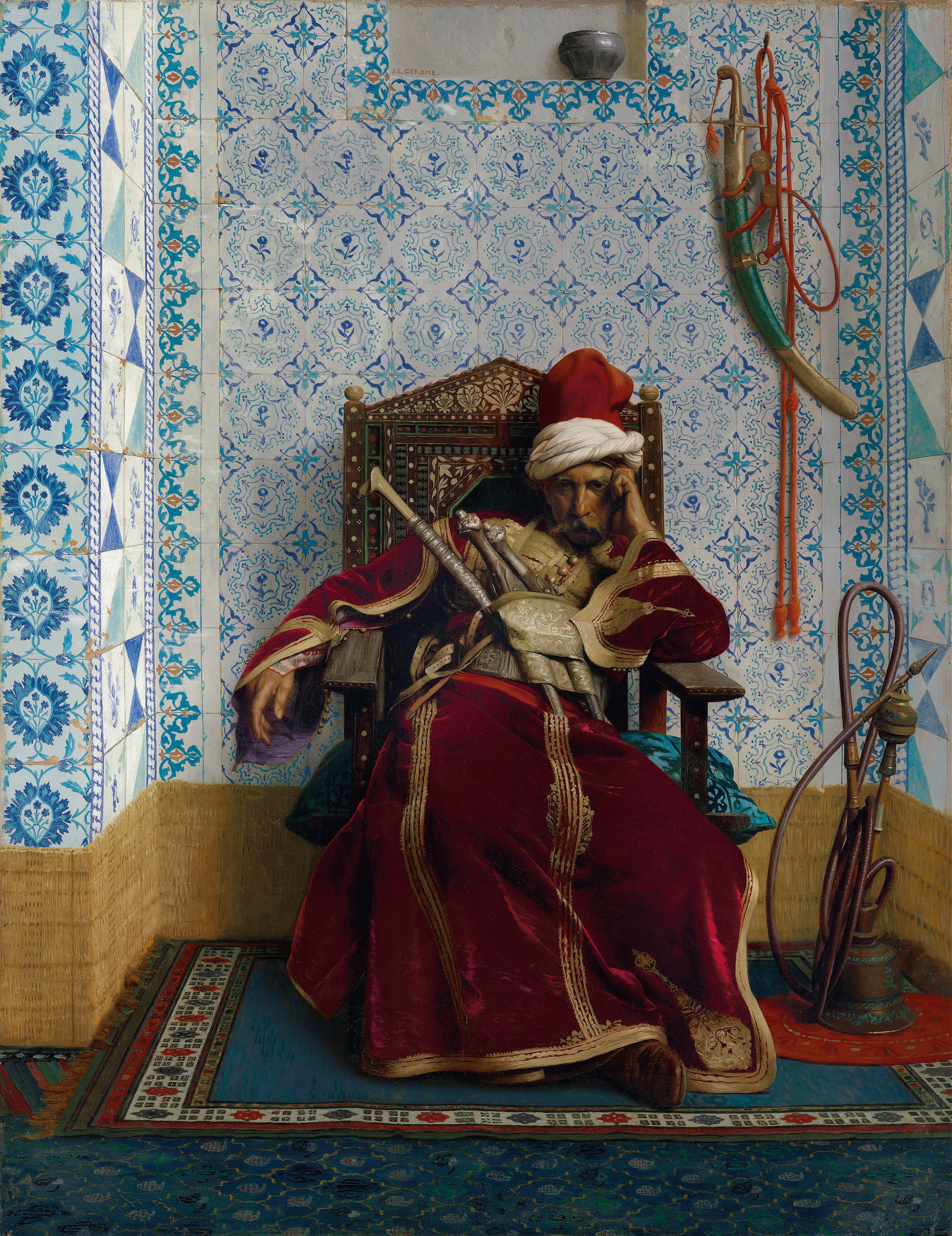

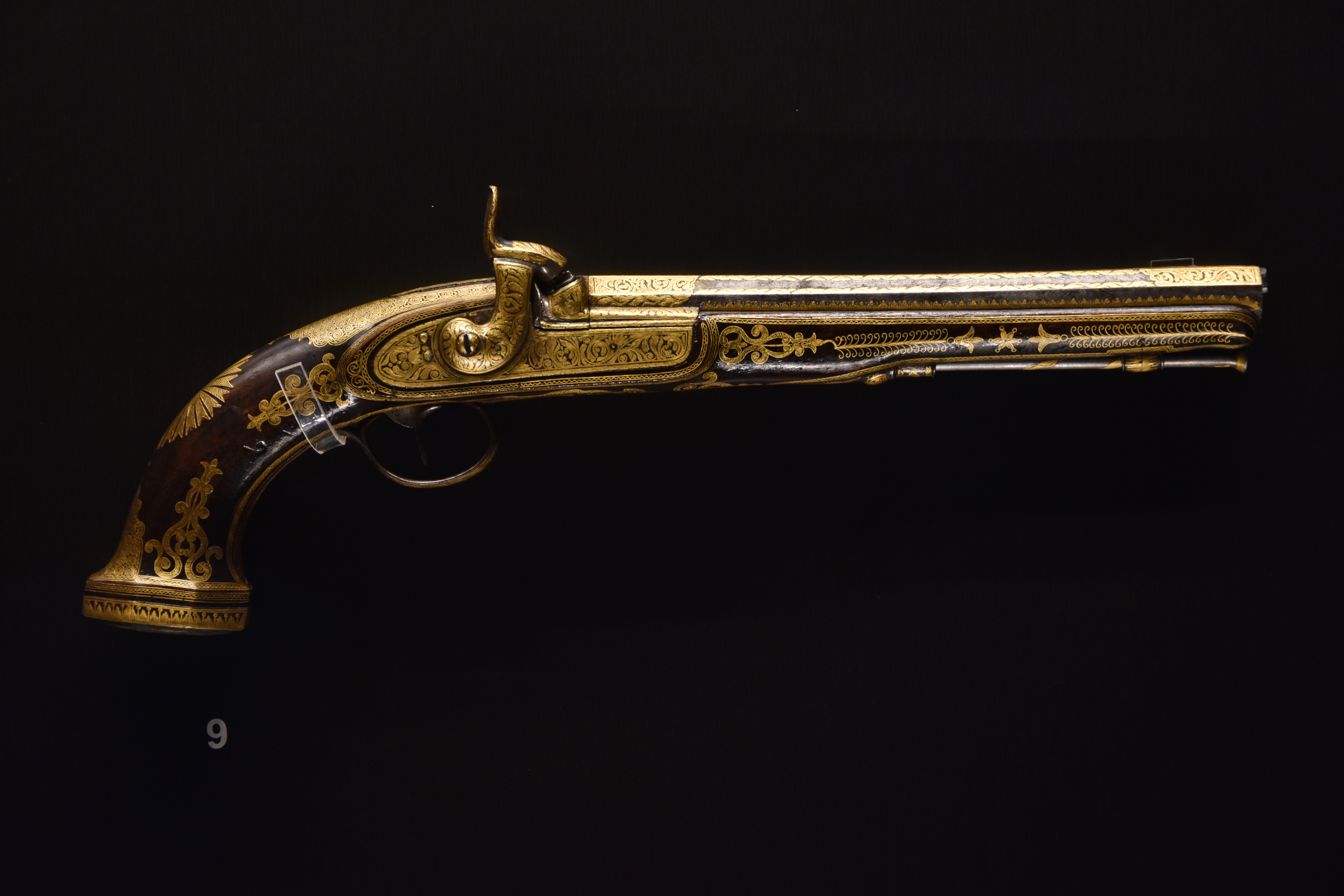
Percussion Lock Kubur

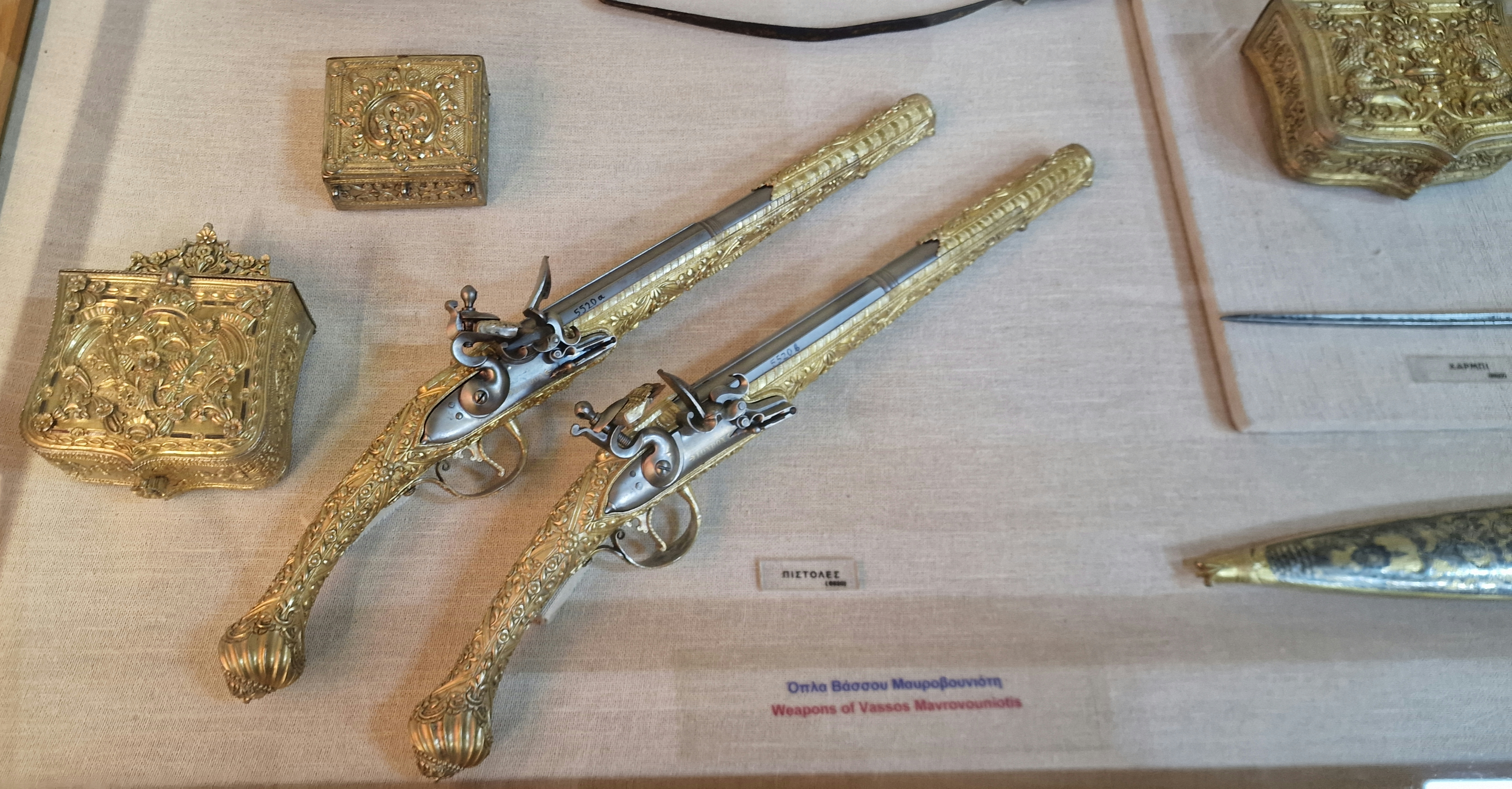
Pistols of Vasos Mavrovouniotis

Shishana, Kariophili, Kubur on a Silahlik, Tançica, & a Boyliya

== See also ==
- Shishane, another popular firearm used in the Ottoman Empire
- Džeferdar, ornate musket from Montenegro
- Tançica, a long barreled musket from Albania
- Kariofili, musket of the Greek revolution
- Boyliya, Bulgarian musket with unique lock
- Khirimi, similar long gun from the Caucasus
- Jezail, Afghan rifle popularized in media
- Moukahla, a North African snaphaunce musket
