= Khirimi =

Firearm of the Caucasus

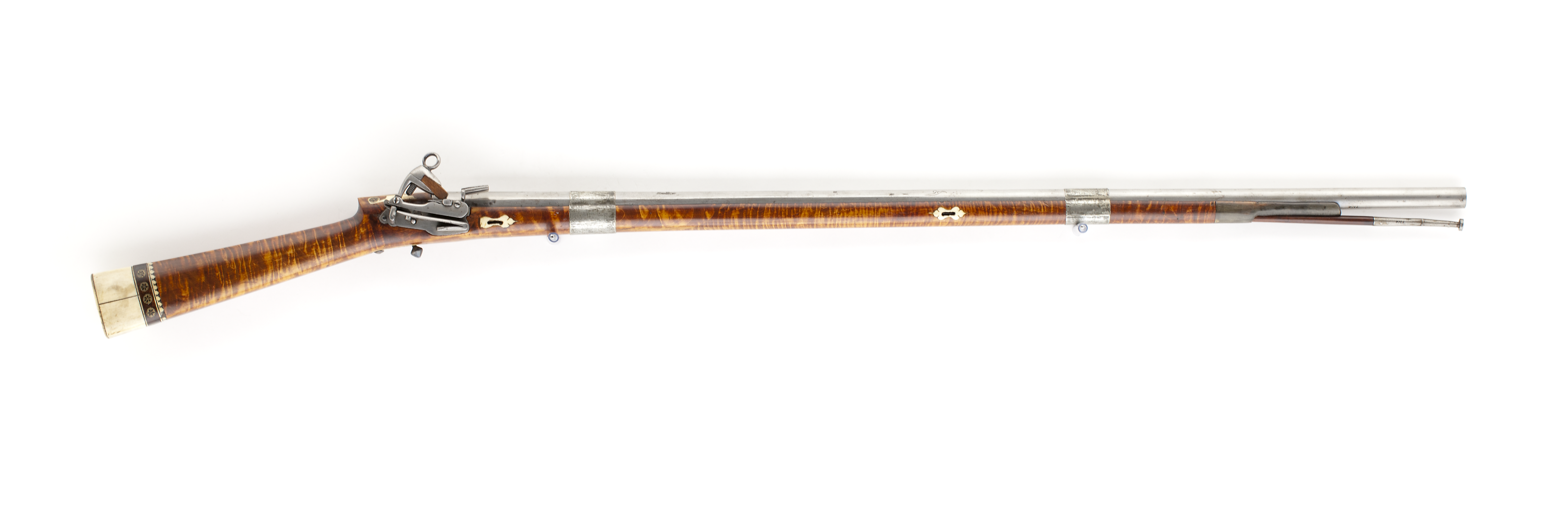
- Khirimi with ivory butt cap and silver barrel bands
- Type: Musket

Service history
- In service: 17th century to early 20th century
- Used by: Caucasian Territories

Production history
- Produced: 17th to mid 19th century

Specifications
- Barrel length: 37–47 in (95–119 cm)
- Caliber: 12–15 mm (0.47–0.59 in)
- Action: Miquelet Lock or Caplock (conversion)

The Khirimi was a distinctive type of musket produced and widely used throughout the Caucasus from the 17th to the early 20th centuries. Characterized by its long, slender barrel, miquelet lock, and ornate decoration, it was a prized weapon of both everyday life and warfare among various Caucasian peoples.

== Design and features ==
The Khirimi is easily identified by several key features:

Barrel: It featured an exceptionally long and slender barrel, which contributed to its accuracy. While most commonly encountered as a rifled weapon, smoothbore variants are also known to exist.

Action: It utilized a miquelet lock, a type of flintlock mechanism known for its reliability. Circassian versions are noted for their miquelet locks with particularly long and pronounced "lips" or jaws designed to hold the flint.

Stock: The stock was typically crafted from Circassian walnut (Juglans regia). A distinctive feature is a decorative section of walrus ivory on the butt. Some stocks were entirely covered in donkey leather for protection and grip.

Trigger: Similar to the Turkish Shishane, it had an exposed ball trigger with no trigger guard.

Sights: It was equipped with an advanced (for the period) barrel-mounted peep sight, similar to those found on the Turkish Shishane, which aided in accuracy.

Decoration: Metal components, such as the barrel bands and trigger, were often made of silver and decorated with intricate niello work, a black metallic alloy inlay. Kubachi was the most well known place for this.

== Production and use ==
The Khirimi was produced by gunsmith guilds and workshops across the North and South Caucasus, including in Dagestan (notably in Kharbuk and Kubachi, and Verkhneye), Chechnya (in Dargo, Miskir-Yurt, Vedeno and Starye Atagi) Ingushetia, Karabakh, Georgia, Kabardino-Balkaria, Armenia, and some parts of Iran.

It saw extensive use during the Caucasian War and the Russo-Circassian War. Photographic evidence confirms its use by irregular forces and militias during the Russo-Turkish War (1877–1878), even as more modern breech-loading rifles, such as the Berdan, Krnka, Carle, Snider, Martini, were becoming available.

Russia would go on to issue official military rifles to their Cossack division that were more in line with the form of the Khirimi than the standard infantry rifle.

== Origin of the name ==
The name "Khirimi" is derived from the word "Crimea" (Qırım). This is because the high-quality damascus steel barrels were primarily forged in the Crimea, notably in the city of Bakhchysarai, and then imported into the Caucasus region to be stocked, locked, and decorated by local gunsmiths. This practice of importing barrels from specialized centers was common throughout the Ottoman Empire and its periphery.

== Gallery ==
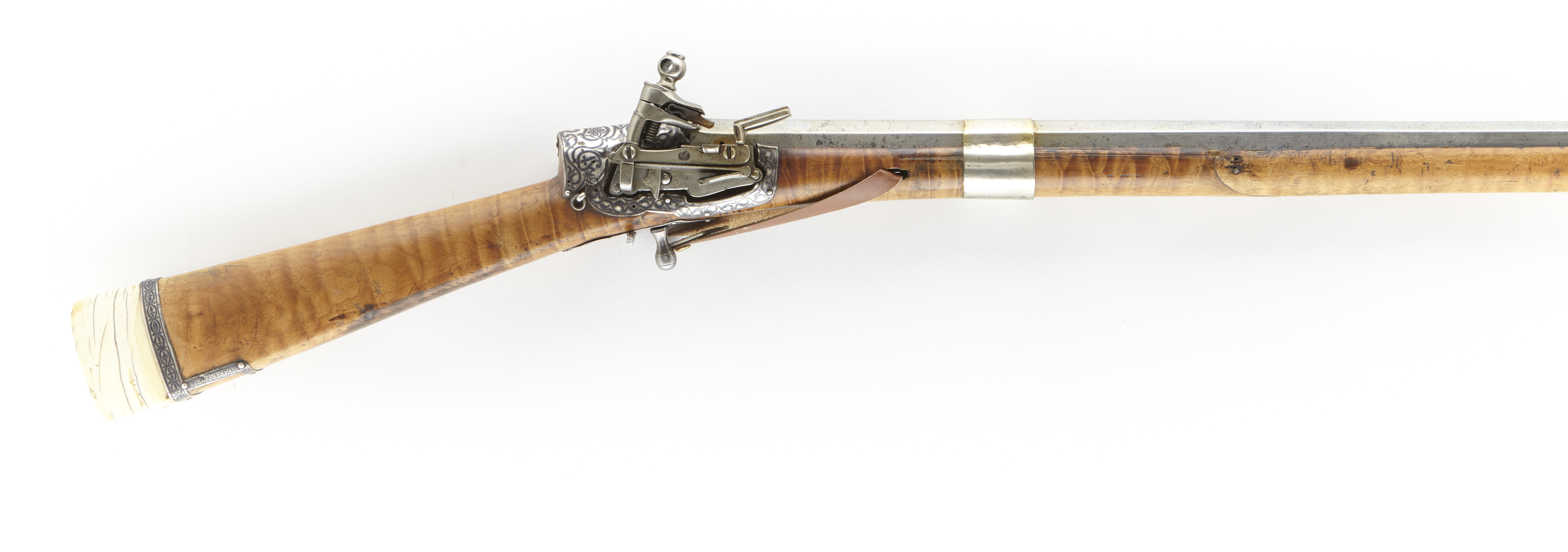

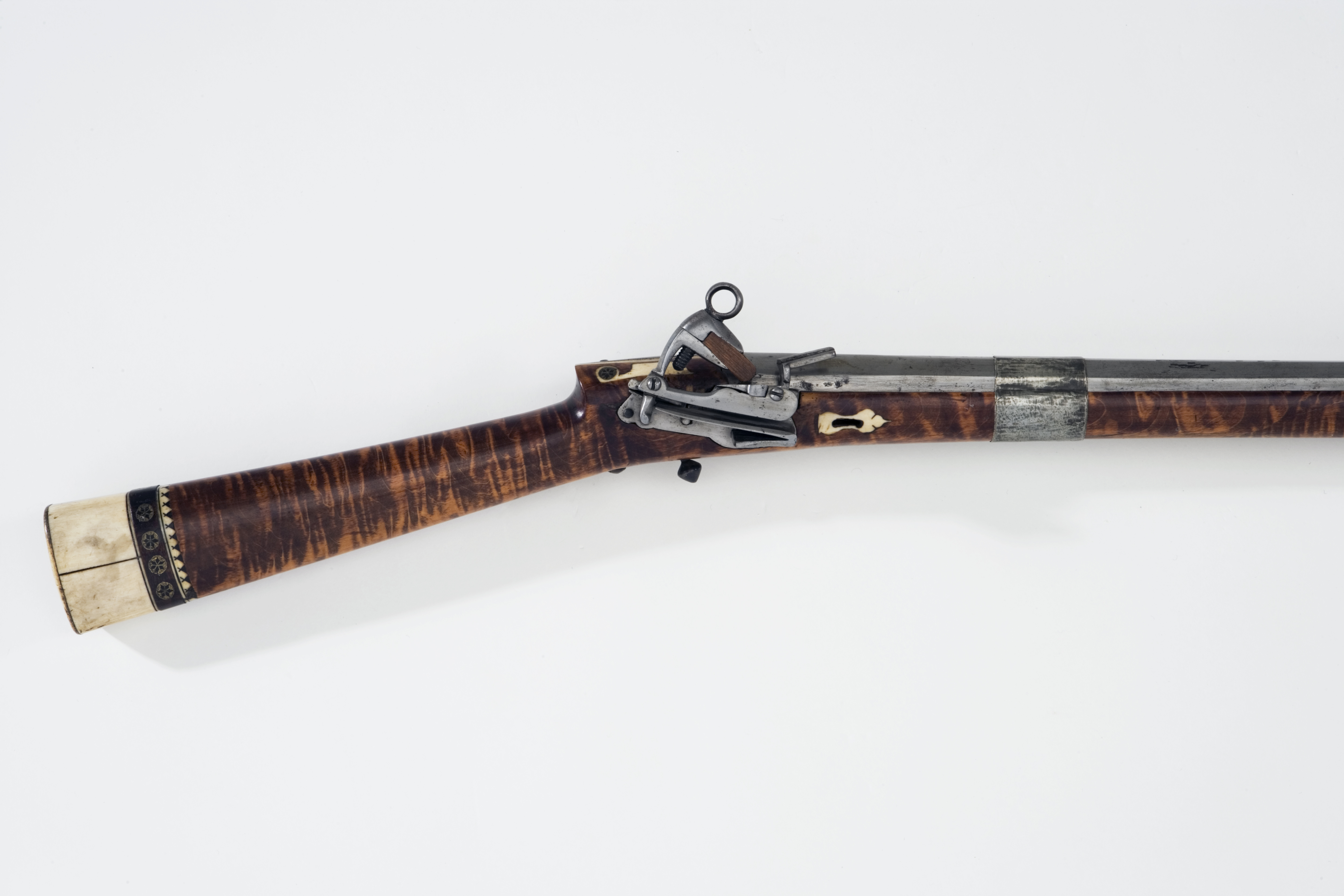

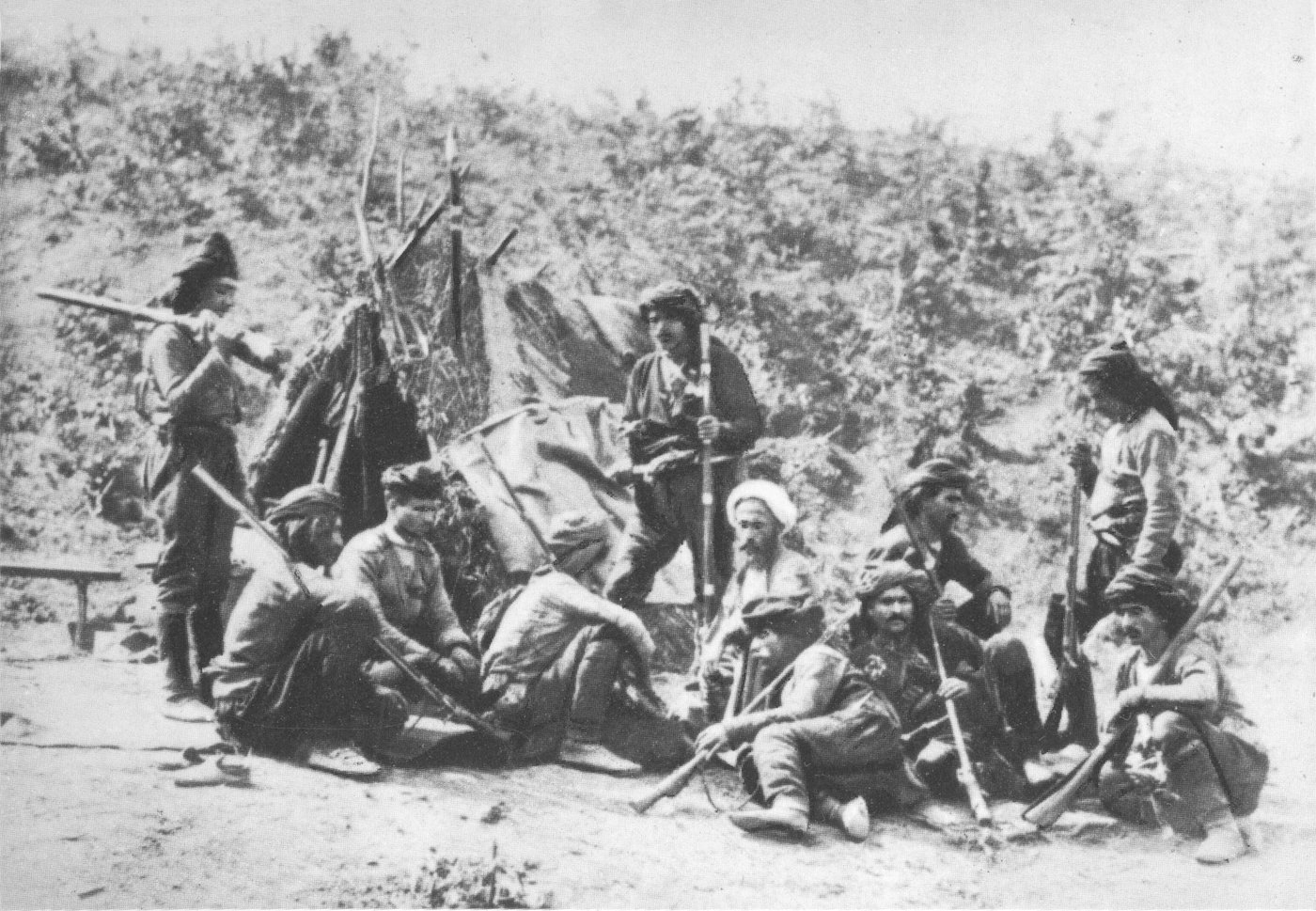

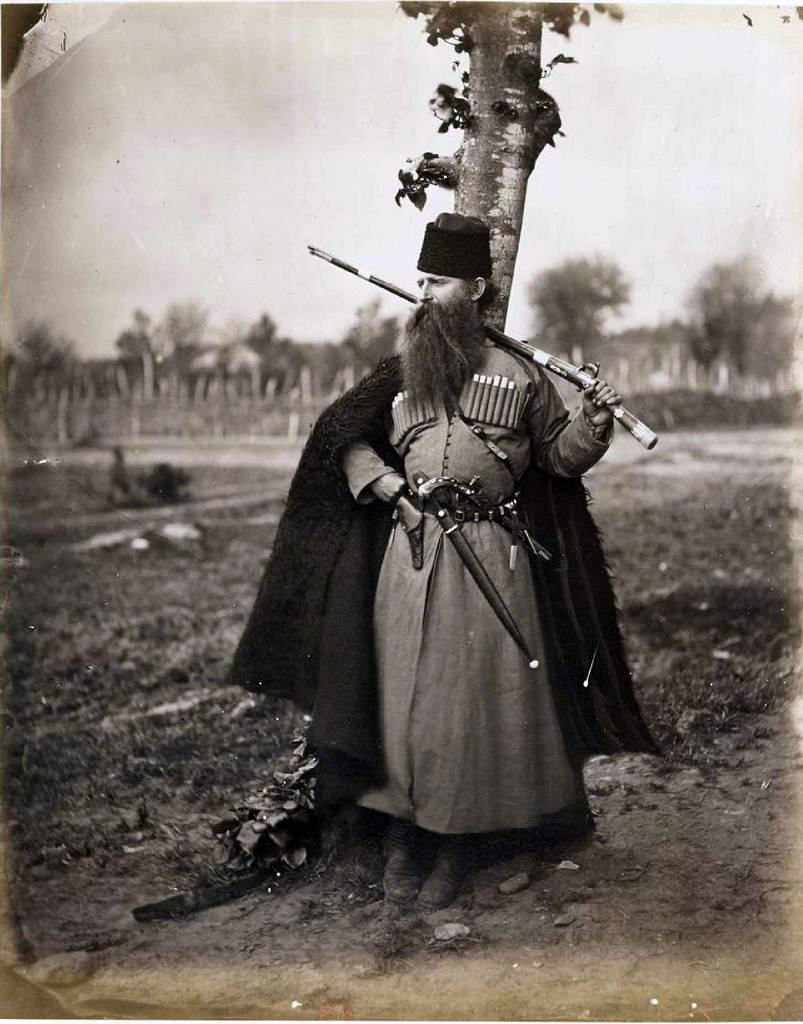

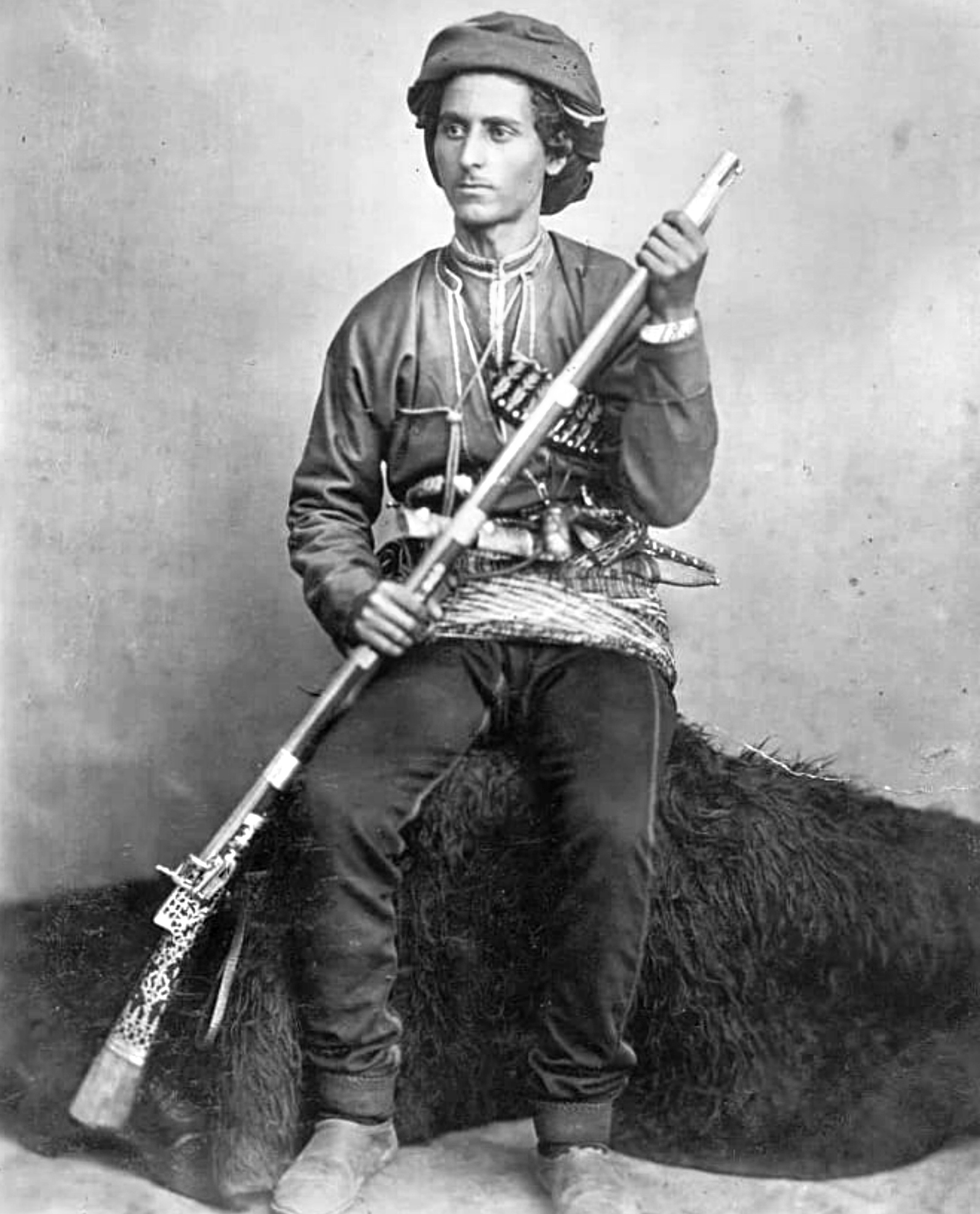

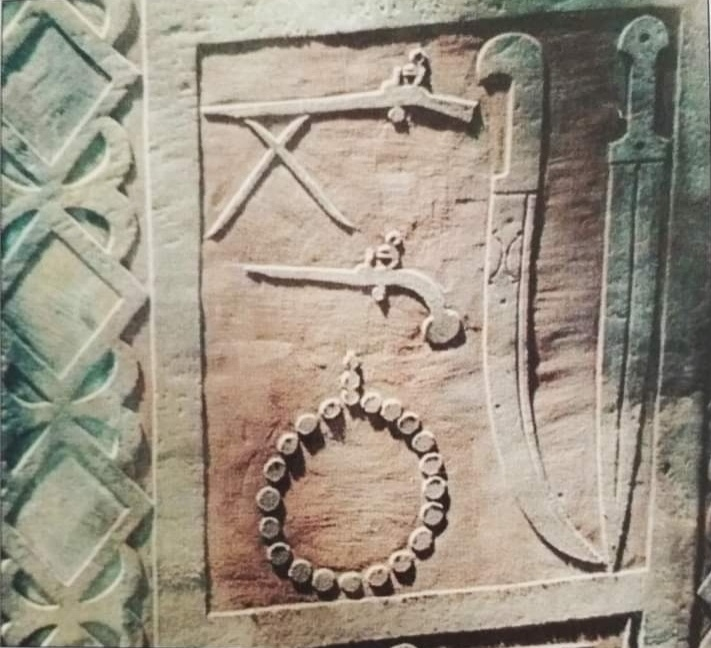
Chechen Warriror Tombstone showing Khirimi, Pistol, Shashka, Kindjal, & Bandolier

== See also ==
- Shishane, a popular musket used in the Ottoman Empire
- Tançica, Albanian musket used throughout the Balkans
- Kariofili, musket of the Greek revolution
- Džeferdar, ornate musket from Montenegro
- Boyliya, Bulgarian musket with unique lock
- Moukahla, a North African snaphaunce musket
- Jezail, Afghan rifle popularized in media
