= Tançica =

Firearm of the Ottoman Empire and Balkans

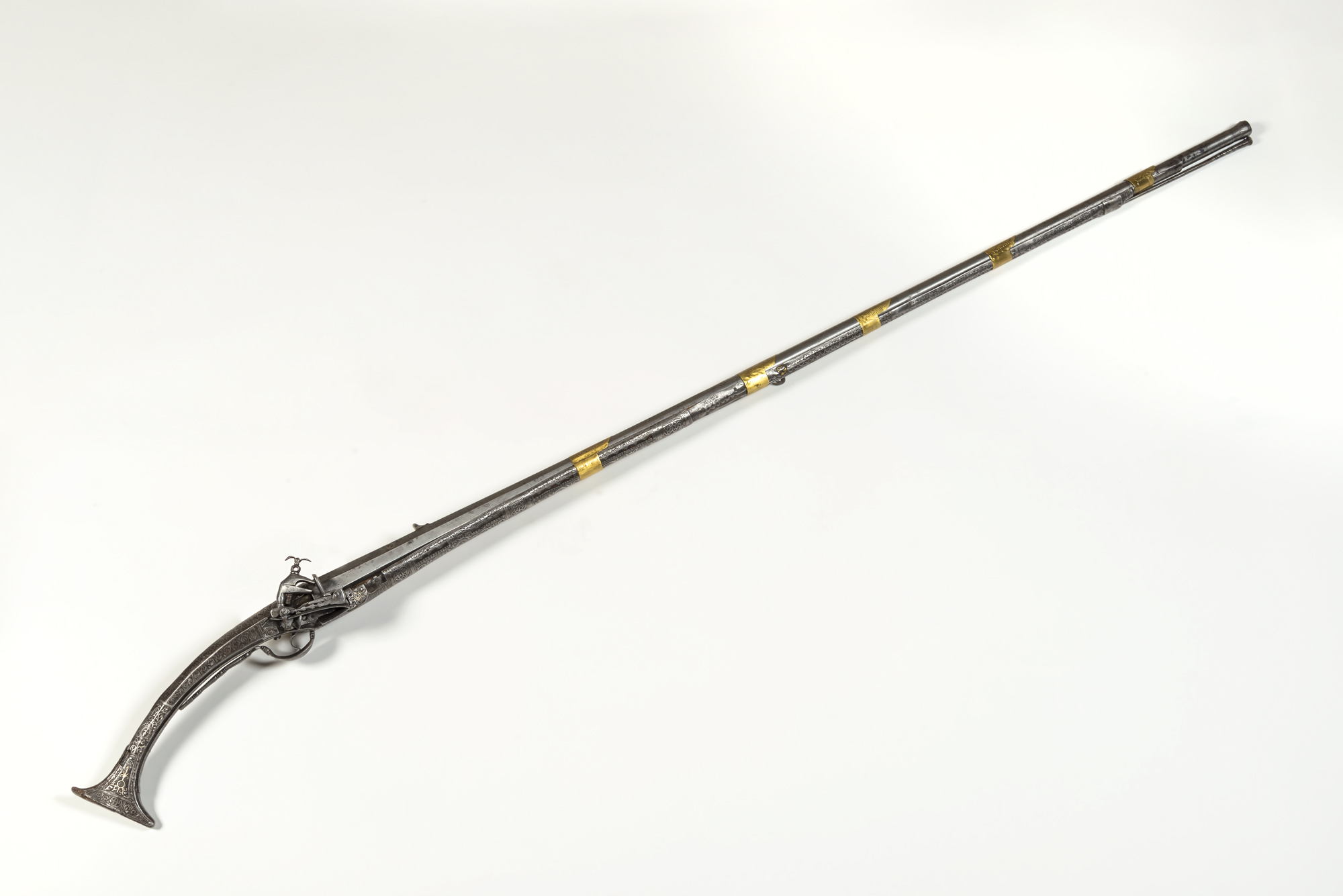
- Albanian Tançica
- Type: Musket

Service history
- In service: 18th century to early 20th century
- Used by: Ottoman Empire; Albania; Boka Navy; Egyptian Police

Production history
- Produced: 18th to mid 19th century

Specifications
- Barrel length: 120–140 cm (48–55 in)
- Caliber: .55–.80
- Action: Miquelet Lock or Caplock (conversion)

The Tançica IPA: [tantʃiˈtsa] also spelled Tančica (meaning "thin gun") or Arnautka (meaning "the Albanian") was a distinctive type of smoothbore musket utilizing a miquelet lock produced and widely used throughout the Balkans and the Ottoman Empire from the 18th to the early 20th centuries. It is primarily attributed to Italian gunsmithing traditions, imported through Albania but was manufactured across the region. The weapon is easily identified by its full metal covered stock and uniquely shaped butt.

== Design and features ==
The most defining characteristic of the Tançica is its stock, which was entirely sheathed in decorated sheet metal, typically iron, steel, brass, or silver. This provided robust protection for the wood underneath and allowed for extensive artistic embellishment, including engraving, filigree, and inlays with precious metals, coral, and niello.

Its other key feature is a curved, downward-pointing buttstock that terminates in a "T" or fishtail shape. They utilized long smoothbore barrels from Brescia often signed "Cominazzi", "Lazarino" or "Mutti"

== Origin and usage ==
While the design is of Albanian origin (hence its regional name Arnautka), the Tançica was produced by local gunsmith guilds and workshops across the Balkans, notably, Bosnia, Kosovo, Macedonia, Montenegro, Serbia & Greece.

Beyond the Balkans, it saw significant use in Egypt, following the rise of Muhammad Ali (an Albanian himself). Albanian troops formed a core part of his military & police force. Contemporary artwork by 19th-century Orientalist painters frequently depicts these soldiers and police officers armed with the distinctive Tançica musket.

Despite the arrival of more modern breech-loading rifles like the Martini, Mannlicher, and Mauser, the Tançica remained in popular use well into the early 20th century. This is evidenced by contemporary photographs, most famously those taken by the Albanian photographer Pietro Marubi, which show the weapon still in use as late as the 1920s.

== Gallery ==
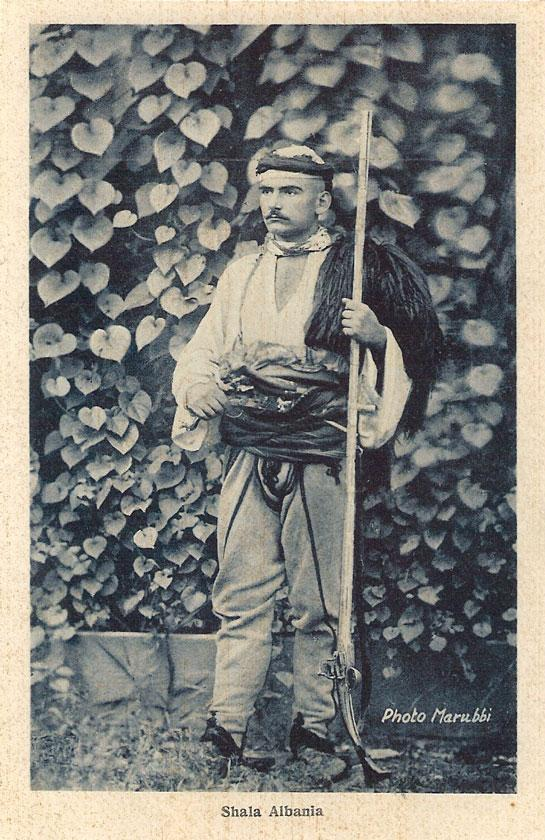
Shala Man

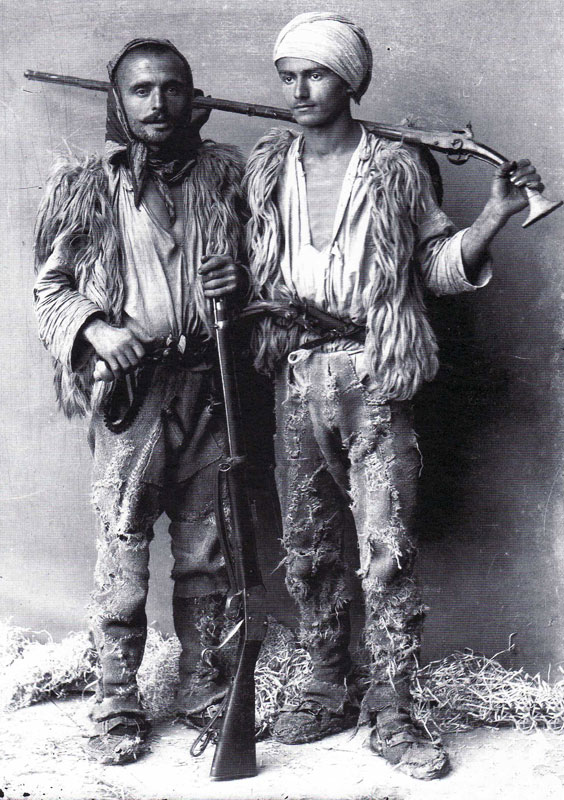
Albanian Men with Martini & Tançica

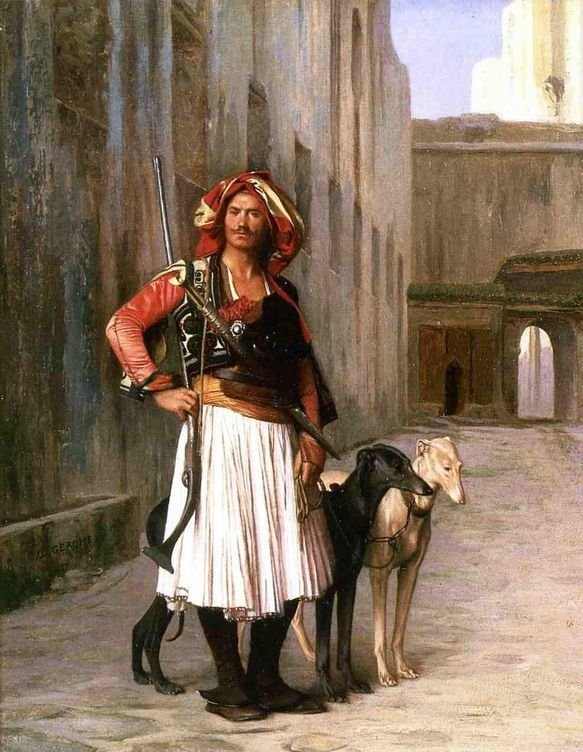
Albanian in Egypt

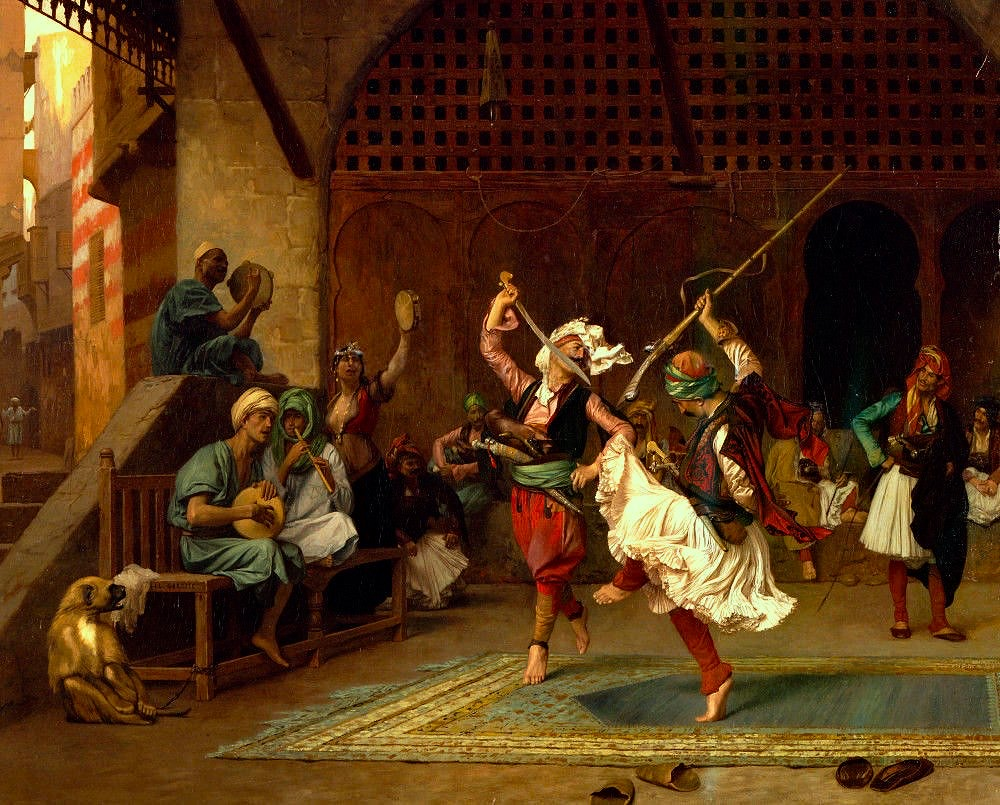
Albanians Dancing with Tançica & Yataghan

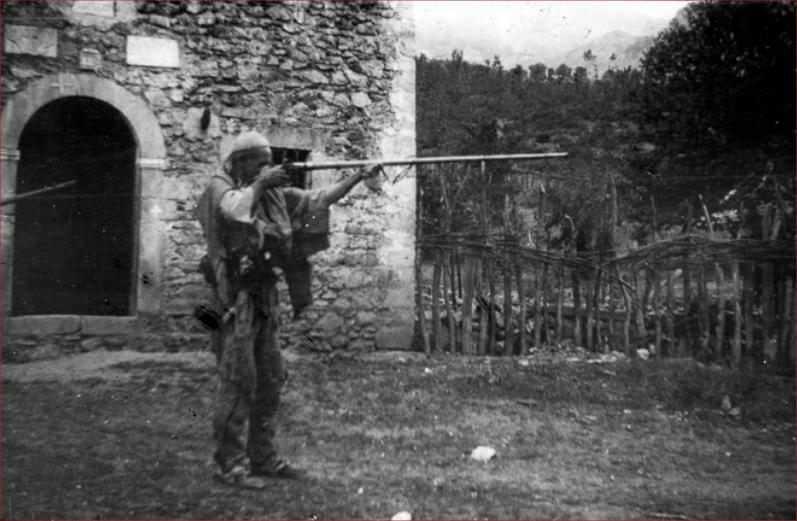
Albanian man shouldering his Tançica, 1908

Shishana, Kariophili, Kubur on a Silahlik, Tançica, & a Boyliya

== See also ==
- Shishane, another popular firearm used in the Ottoman Empire
- Kariofili, musket of the Greek revolution
- Džeferdar, ornate musket from Montenegro
- Boyliya, Bulgarian musket with unique lock
- Kubur, Ottoman handgun
- Khirimi, Caucasian miquelet musket
- Moukahla, a North African snaphaunce musket
- Jezail, Afghan rifle popularized in media
