= Kariofili =

Firearm of the Ottoman Empire and the Balkans

- Flintlock kariofili
- Type: Musket

Service history
- In service: 18th century to early 20th century
- Used by: Greece

Production history
- Produced: 18th to mid 19th century

Specifications
- Barrel length: 30–44 inches
- Caliber: .55–.80
- Action: Flintlock or Caplock (conversion)

The kariofili (Greek: καριοφίλι), also spelled kariophili, was a smoothbore musket produced and used throughout Greece and its neighbouring territories within the Ottoman Empire from the 18th to the early 20th centuries. A symbol of resistance and status, it was the characteristic arm of the klephts and armatoles, and played a significant role in the Greek War of Independence.

== Etymology ==
The origin of the name kariofili is uncertain. A common folk etymology suggests it is a Hellenized corruption of the Italian phrase "Carlo e Figli" (Carlo and Sons), implying the guns were based on those from a known Italian gunsmithing family. However, historical research has not identified any Italian gunmakers named "Carlo & Figli" operating in the relevant period, casting doubt on this theory. Alternative theories propose the name may derive from the Turkish word karanfil (meaning carnation, and later a term for a rifled gun), which also influenced the Slavic name Karanfilka.

== Design and features ==
The stock was typically covered in sheets of brass, silver, or iron, often covering the entire wrist and butt area. It curves upward sharply in a manner similar to the Afghan Jezail but ends in a distinctive, ornate fork or fishtail shape. Most used exported flintlocks from Italy, France, and Germany; many were later converted to percussion. Some examples have been found converted to the Berdan and Gras breechloading systems. Though predominantly made with Italian smoothbore barrels from Brescia, examples with Turkish rifled barrels are known. Many specimens are highly personalized, featuring engraved decorations, and often inscribed with the date, place of manufacture, or the owner's name on the left side of the stock.

=== Regional variations ===
Significant regional variations existed. In Macedonia, a distinct style known as the Makedonka (Μακεδόνκα) was produced, characterized by its butt inlaid with alternating layers of walrus ivory and wood. A variant utilizing a miquelet lock was produced in the Balkans and known by the name Rašak; these seldom have a trigger guard.

== Historical context and use ==
Its most famous period of use was during the Greek War of Independence (1821–1829), where it was wielded by revolutionary forces and became a symbol of identity for fighting against Ottoman rule. Its use continued in more remote areas of the Balkans well into the early 20th century before being finally supplanted by modern, breech-loading rifles, such as the Gras and Mannlicher.

== Gallery ==
Gilded stocked kariofili

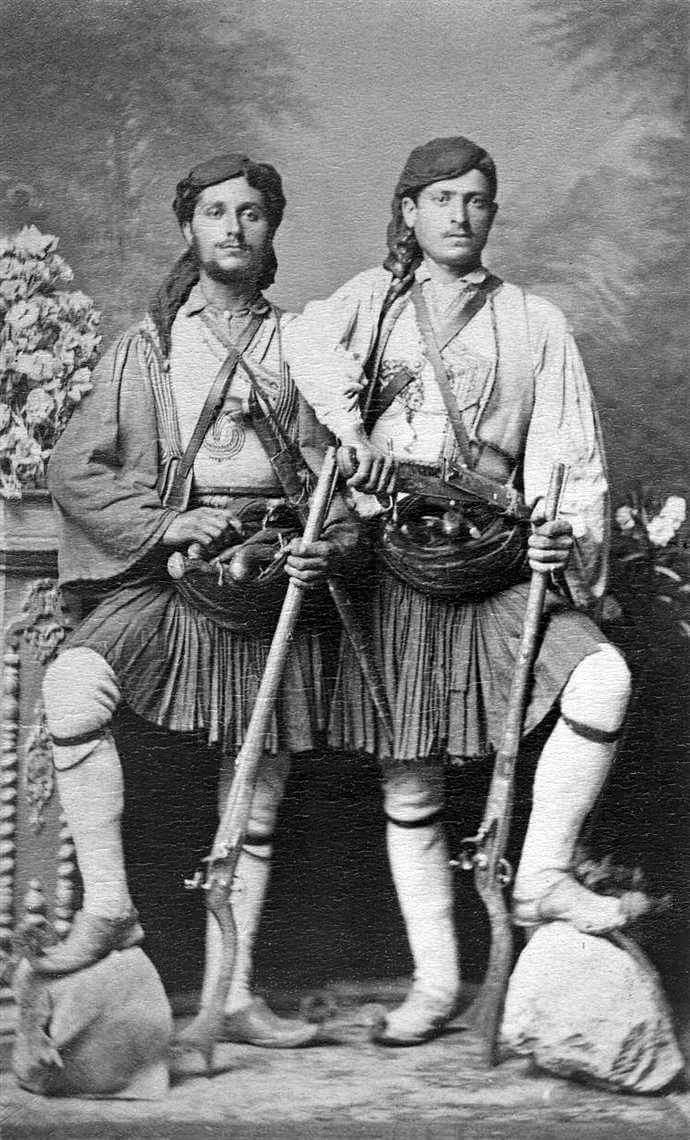
Greek armatoles

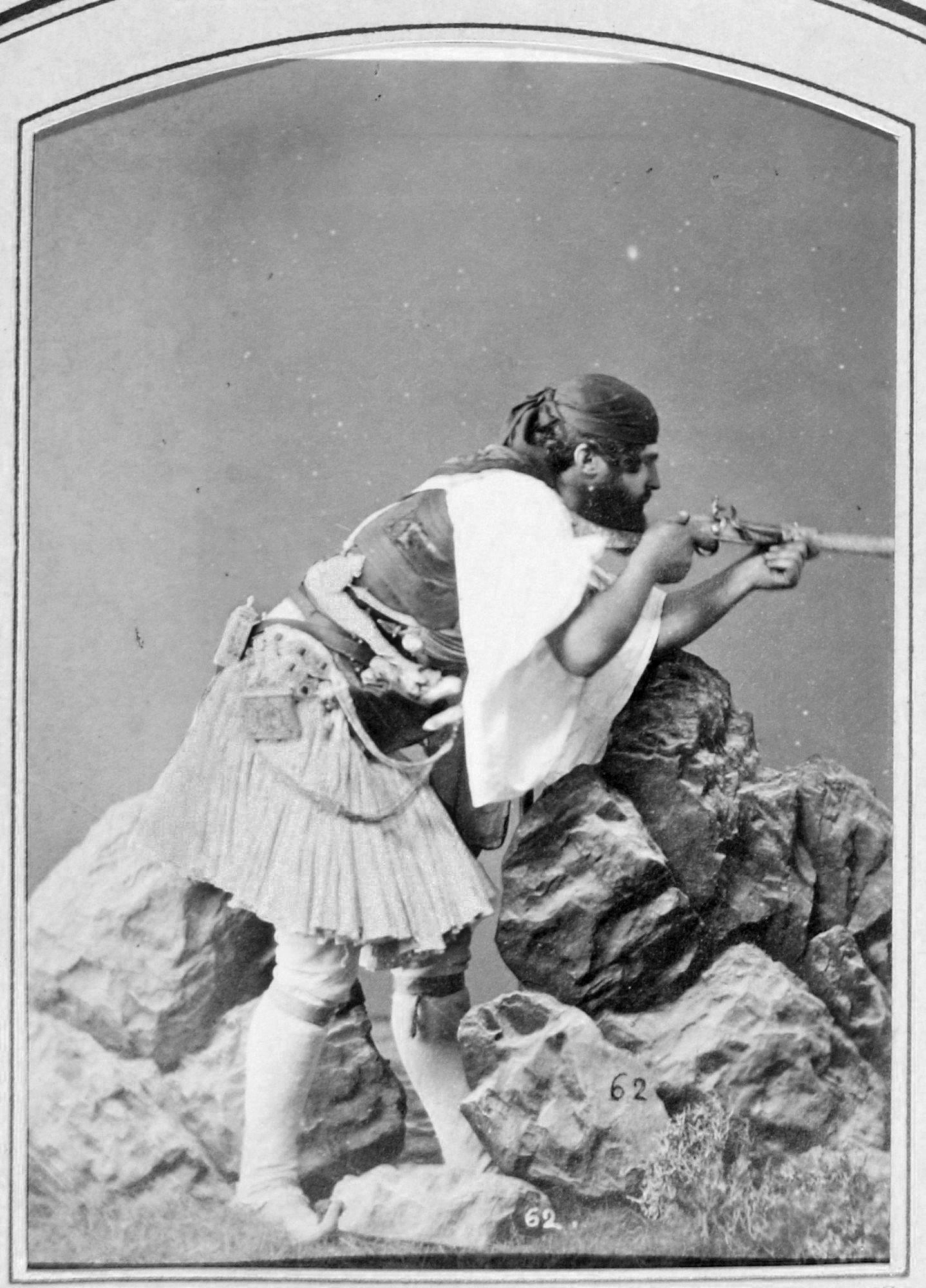
Shouldering and aiming a kariofili

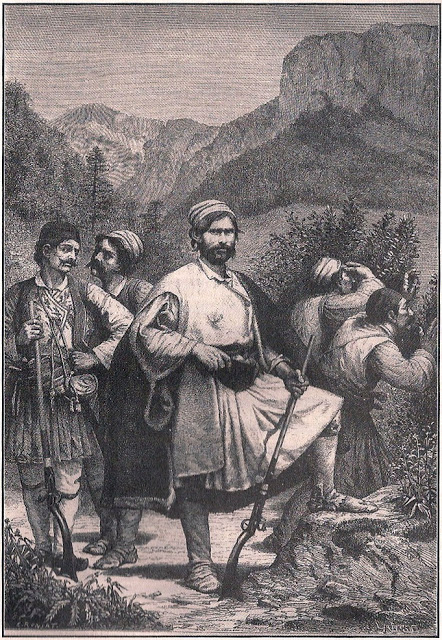
Illustration of klephts

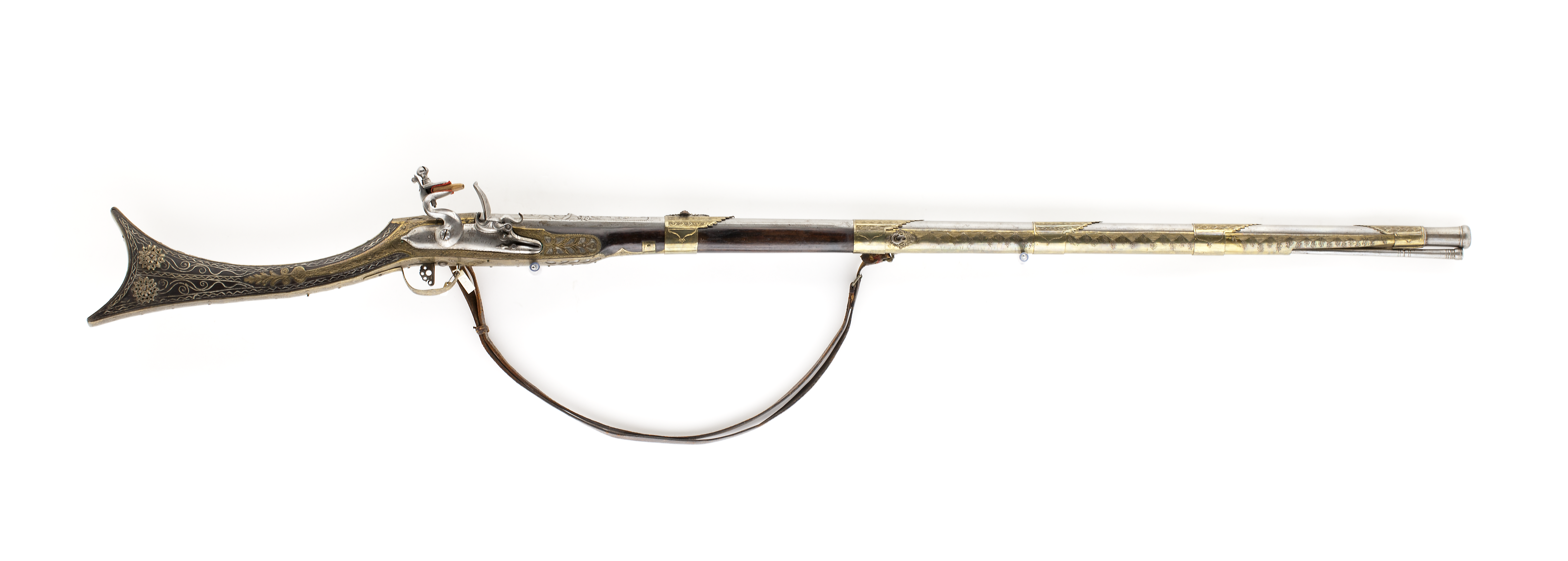
Flintlock kariofili with sling

A collection of different weapons: shishana, kariofili, kubur on top of a silahlik, tançica, and a boyliya

== See also ==
- Shishane, another popular firearm used in the Ottoman Empire
- Tançica, Albanian long barreled musket
- Džeferdar, ornate musket from Montenegro
- Boyliya, Bulgarian musket with unique lock
- Kubur, Ottoman handgun
- Khirimi, Caucasian miquelet musket
- Moukahla, a North African snaphaunce musket

== Sources ==
- Astvatsaturyan, E.G. Турецкое Оружие 2002
- Elgood, Robert. Firearms of the Islamic World in the Tareg Rajab Museum, Kuwait 1995
- Elgood, Robert. The Arms of Greece and her Balkan Neighbours in the Ottoman Period 2009
