= Boyliya =

Firearm of the Ottoman Empire and Balkans

- Type: Musket

Service history
- In service: 18th century to early 20th century
- Used by: Bulgaria

Production history
- Produced: 18th to mid 19th century

Specifications
- Barrel length: 30–44 in (76–112 cm)
- Caliber: .62–.80 in (16–20 mm)
- Action: Miquelet Lock or Percussion (conversion)

The Boyliya (Bulgarian: Бойлия) was a smoothbore musket produced in Bulgaria and used by its neighboring territories within the Ottoman Empire from the 18th to the early 20th centuries. A symbol of resistance and status, it was the characteristic arm of the Haiduti.

== Design and features ==
Stock: The stock is similar in form to the Turkish Shishane but features a much slimmer butt, more in line with contemporary Western European stock designs.

Bulgarian Miquelet Locks

Lock: The Boyliya's lock is its most standout feature. It is a unique and original Bulgarian pattern of the miquelet lock, not found on other regional firearms. The lockplate, cock, and bridge are almost always fully sheathed in brass or silver, a feature that may have served both decorative and practical purposes, such as protecting the mechanism from black powder fouling. A YouTube video depicts a Boyliya lock being operated

Barrel: Although the town of Sliven was well-regarded for producing high-quality barrels (both rifled and smoothbore), some examples of the Boyliya were constructed using imported barrels from Italy, England, and Germany.

Decoration: Most specimens are highly personalized, featuring engraved silver decorations, and often inscribed with the date and/or the owner's name on a piece of mother of pearl on the right side of the stock, behind the lock. Extensive use of Khatam style rosette inlays made from brass & horn. The butt is wrapped in a gold embroidered velvet fabric.

== Origin and use ==
The Boyliya draws its origins from the town of Sliven, which was a major center of weapons manufacturing in the Ottoman Empire.

Beyond its practical use, the Boyliya held significant cultural importance. As a powerful symbol of resistance, it was a point of patriotic pride during the Bulgarian struggle against Ottoman rule, to which folk songs were written about it. Today, the muskets remain highly prized and coveted by collectors in Bulgaria for their historical significance and artistry. Ali Pasha of Yanina owned gilded Boyliya made in 1804.

== Gallery ==
Shishana, Kariophili, Kubur on a Silahlik, Tançica, & a Boyliya

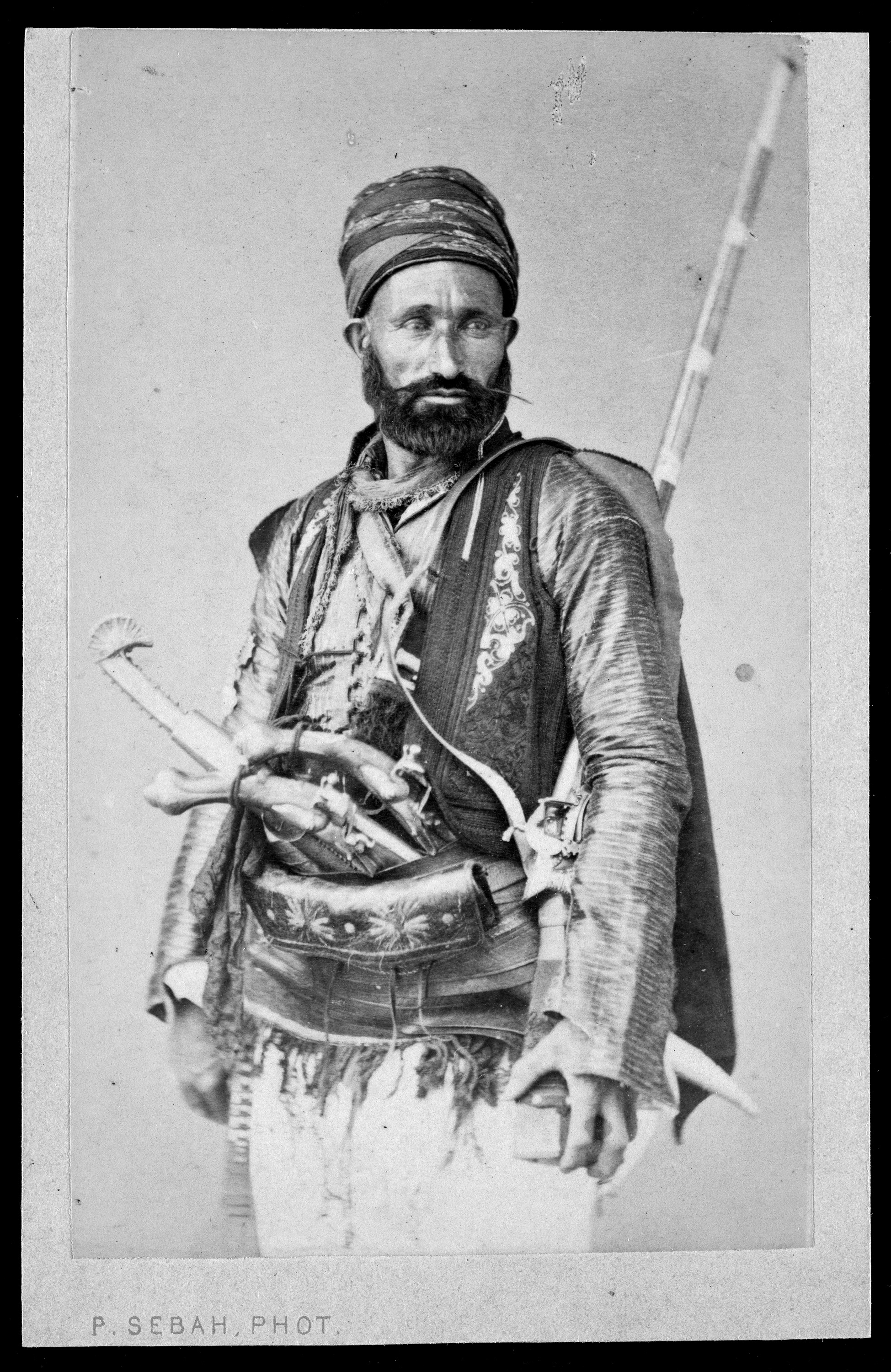
Bashi-bazouk armed with a Boyliya & with Kubur & Yataghan tucked into a Silahlik

== See also ==
- Shishane, another popular firearm used in the Ottoman Empire
- Kariofili, musket of the Greek Revolution
- Tançica, Albanian long barreled musket
- Džeferdar, ornate musket from Montenegro
- Khirimi, Caucasian miquelet musket
- Moukahla, a North African snaphaunce musket
- Jezail, Afghan rifle popularized in media
