= Džeferdar =

Firearm of the Ottoman Empire and Balkans

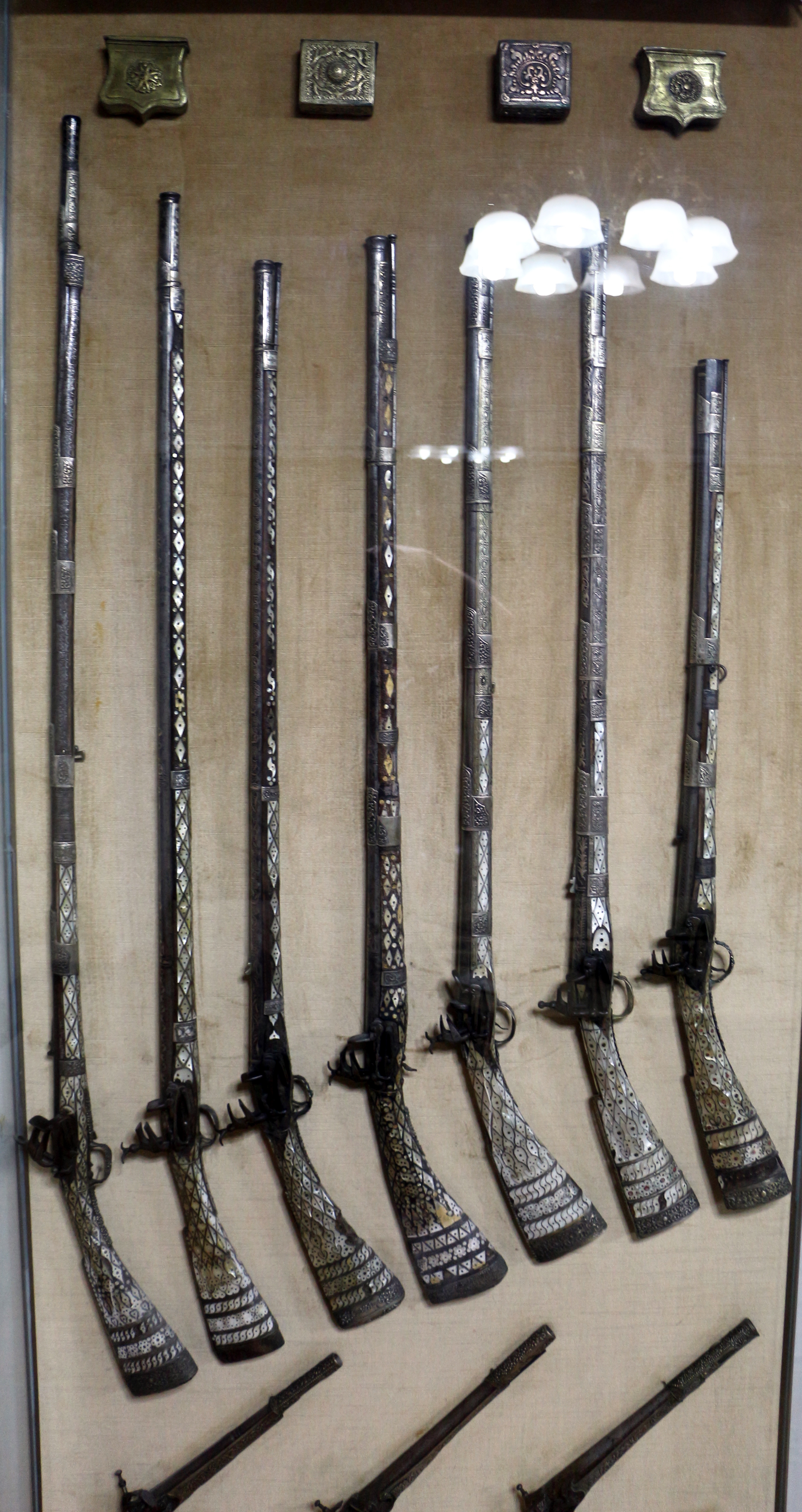
- Collection of Džeferdars with different barrel lengths
- Type: Musket

Service history
- In service: 18th century to early 20th century
- Used by: Ottoman Empire; Montenegro; Boka Navy

Production history
- Produced: 18th to mid 19th century

Specifications
- Barrel length: 81–119 cm (32–47 in)
- Caliber: .62–.71
- Action: Miquelet Lock or Caplock (conversion)

The Džeferdar IPA: [dʒefer̩dar] was an ornate, smoothbore musket that was popular in the Western Balkans during the Ottoman rule.

== Etymology ==
The name "Džeferdar" is thought to derive from the Arabic word "jawhara" (جوهرة), meaning "jewel," a direct reference to its lavish mother-of-pearl decoration.

== Design and features ==
The most defining characteristic of the Džeferdar is its stock, which was covered in mother of pearl inlay. It used the typical Balkan style Miquelet lock found on the Tançica & Rašak. The barrel is usually decorated with silver or coral.

== Origin and usage ==
The Džeferdar was primarily produced in the Boka Kotorska region of Montenegro. Herceg Novi, Kotor, and Risan being the major centers of manufacture. It was said that a Džeferdar cost 1000 Groschen, 30 Ducats, or 3,900 Akçe. The Džeferdar had many symbolic uses in weddings, folk songs, & blood feuds.

== Variants: The Čibuklija ==
An identical gun in form and lock mechanism, but lacking the signature mother of pearl inlay, was produced in Bosnian workshops, notably in Sarajevo and Fojnica. These weapons were known by the name Čibuklija. The stocks of the Čibuklija were sometimes covered in sheets of engraved brass or left as plain wood. The name "Cibuklija" is derived from its visual resemblance to the long stem of a Turkish tobacco pipe, known as a "çıbuk" or "çubuk".

== Gallery ==
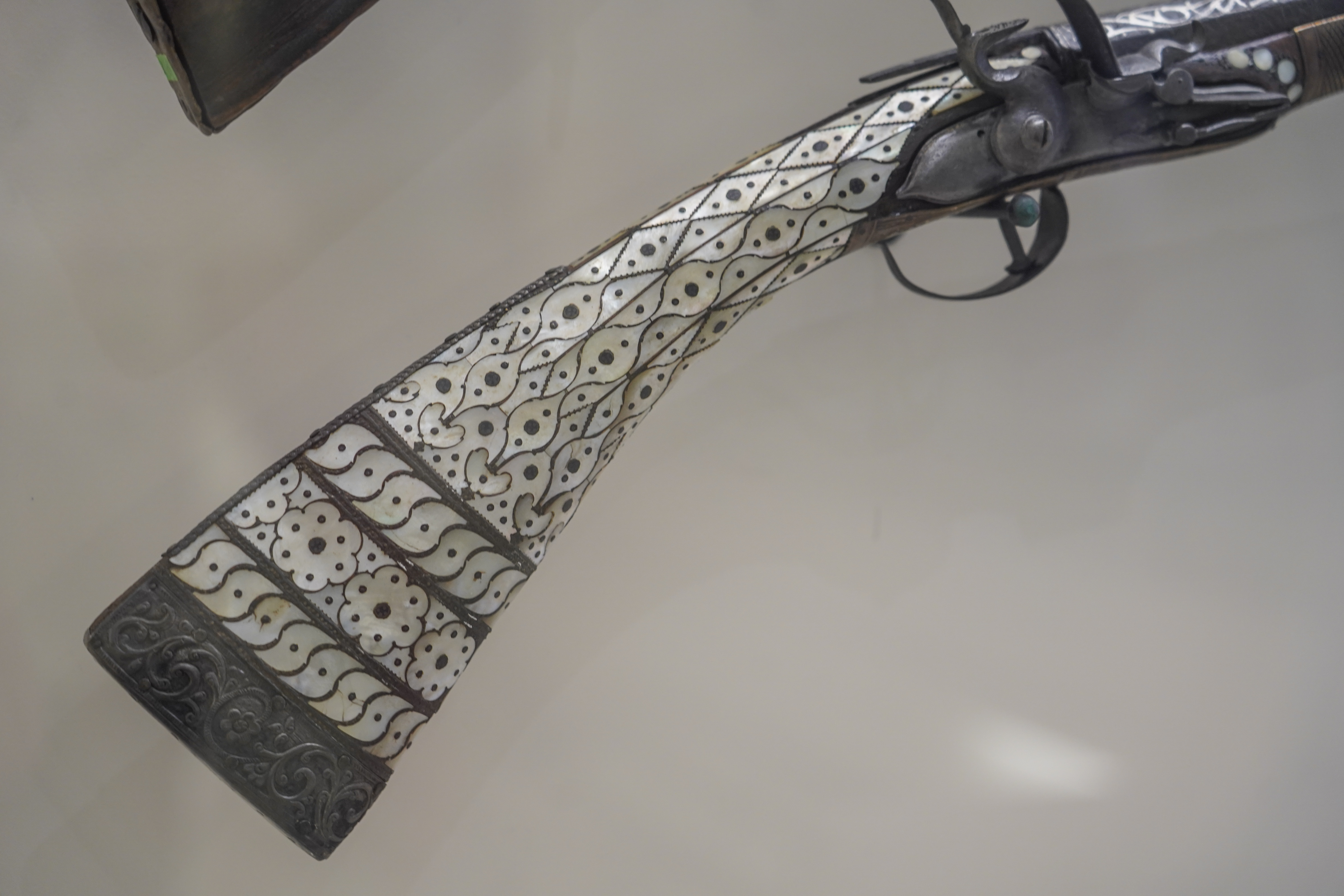

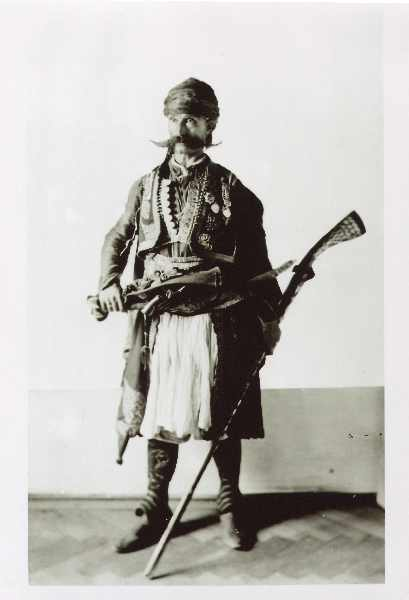

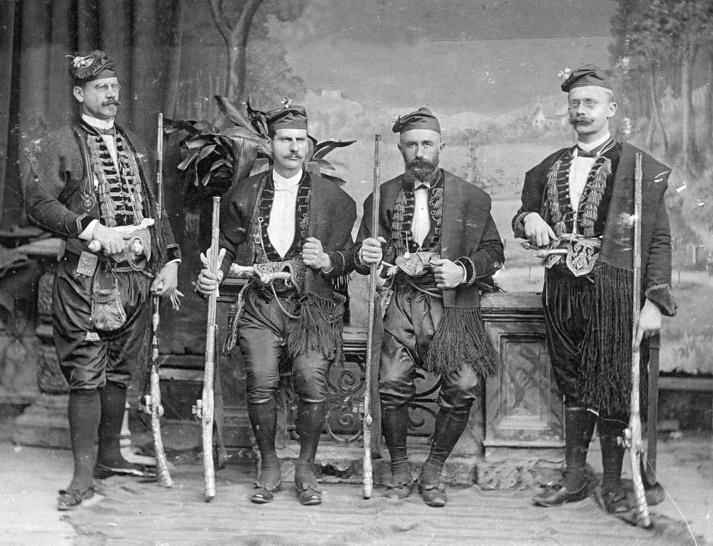

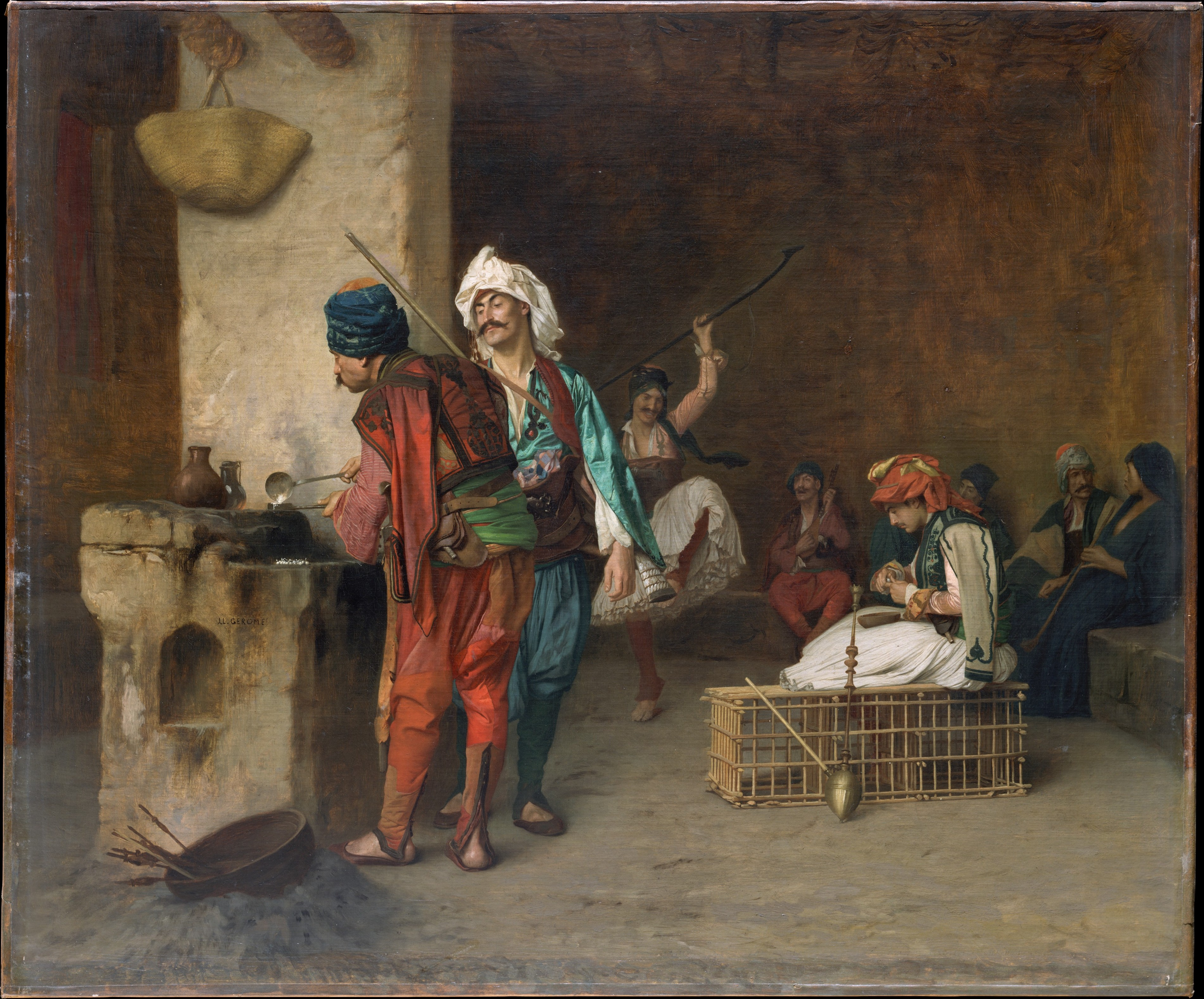

== See also ==
- Shishane, another popular firearm used in the Ottoman Empire
- Tançica, long barreled Albanian musket
- Kariofili, musket of the Greek revolution
- Boyliya, Bulgarian musket with unique lock
- Kubur, Ottoman handgun
- Khirimi, Caucasian miquelet musket
- Moukahla, a North African snaphaunce musket
- Jezail, Afghan rifle popularized in media
