= Verkhneye Kazanishche =

Verkhneye Kazanishche Верхнее Казанище
- Selo
- Location within Republic of Dagestan Location within Russia
- Coordinates: 42°44′N 47°08′E
- Country: Russia
- Region: Republic of Dagestan
- District: Buynaksky District
- Time zone: UTC+3:00

Verkhneye Kazanishche (Russian: Верхнее Казанище) is a rural locality (a selo) and the administrative centre of Verkhnekazanishchensky Selsoviet, Buynaksky District, Republic of Dagestan, Russia. The population was 6,573 as of 2010. There are 53 streets.

== Geography ==
Verkhneye Kazanishche is located 13 km south of Buynaksk (the district's administrative centre) by road. Nizhneye Kazanishche is the nearest rural locality.
