= Kharbuk =

Kharbuk Харбук Хъярбук
- Selo
- Location within Republic of Dagestan Location within Russia
- Coordinates: 42°09′N 47°31′E
- Country: Russia
- Region: Republic of Dagestan
- District: Dakhadayevsky District
- Time zone: UTC+3:00

Kharbuk (Russian: Харбук; Dargwa: Хъярбук) is a rural locality (a selo) in Dakhadayevsky District, Republic of Dagestan, Russia. The population was 1,528 as of 2010. There are 5 streets.

== Geography ==
Kharbuk is located 17 km west of Urkarakh (the district's administrative centre) by road. Kishcha and Khurshni are the nearest rural localities.
