= Anglo-Turkish War =

Anglo-Turkish War may refer to:

- Anglo-Turkish War (1807–1809), part of the Napoleonic Wars
- Middle Eastern theatre of World War I (1914–1918), where Britain and Turkey fought on several fronts
- Anglo-Turkish War (1918–1923), part of the Turkish War of Independence
  - Al-Jazeera front, part of the Anglo-Turkish War of 1918-1923.
