= Moukahla =

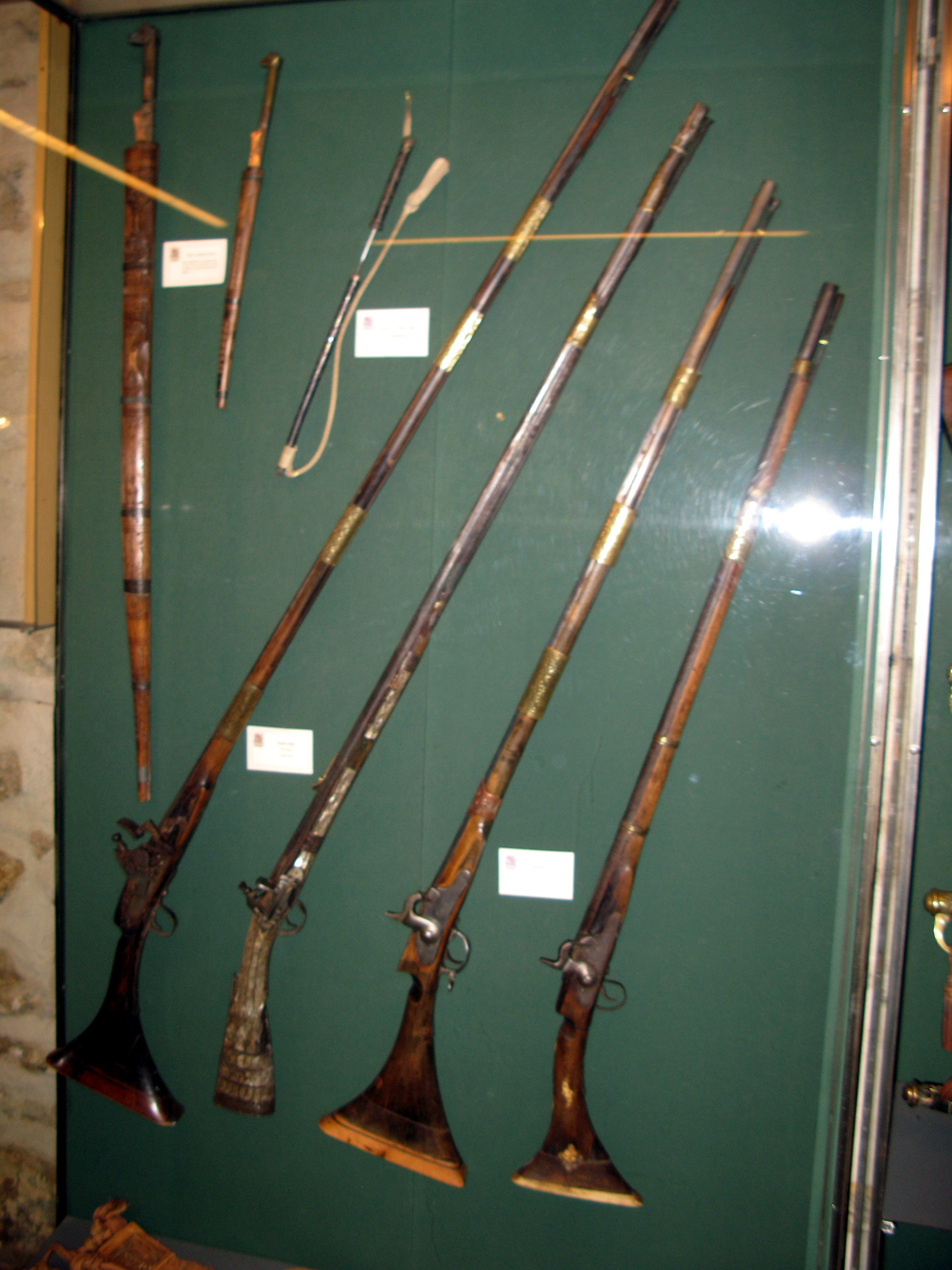
- (Left to right) Moukahla with snaphance lock, Džeferdar with miquelet lock, two moukhala converted to percussion lock.
- Type: Musket

Service history
- In service: 17th to late 19th century
- Used by: Kingdom of Morocco; Deylik of Algiers; Beylik of Tunis
- Wars: Nearly every war in the Maghreb from the 17th to 20th century

Production history
- Produced: 17th to early 20th century
- Variants: Kabyle Muskets, and other local variants

Specifications
- Length: Up to 180 cm (6 ft)
- Caliber: .40-.75
- Action: Flintlock/percussion lock (conversion)

The Moukahla (Arabic: مكحلة) or moukalla was a type of musket widely used in North Africa, produced by many tribes, clans and nations.

== Mechanism ==
=== Lock ===
Two systems of gunlock prevailed in the Moukahla. One, which derived from Dutch and English types of snaphance lock, was found usually with a thicker lockplate. Half cock was provided by a dog catch behind the cock, and at full cock, the sear passing through the lockplate engaged the heel of the cock. The other mechanism was the so-called Arab toe-lock, a form of miquelet lock, closely allied to the agujeta lock (which required a back or dog catch for half cock) and the Italian romanlock. The term miquelet is used today to describe a particular type of snaplock. The miquelet lock, in all varieties, was common for several centuries in the countries surrounding the Mediterranean, particularly in Spain, Italy, the Balkans, and Ottoman domains including the coastal states of North Africa. The type of musket would be described as a Kabyle snaphance or a Kabyle miquelet. Some muskets were converted to the percussion lock starting in the mid-19th century.

=== Other parts ===
The moukahla's caliber was usually .67, being very long. At around 6 feet, the plain barrel alone is 44 to 52 inches in length. The barrel was retained in the stock by about twelve iron, brass, or silver bands (capucines). When silver was used, it was often done in the niello form, and may have all metal work engraved and locks may be covered in sheets of silver. The stock and trumpet shaped butt is typically engraved with silver shapes inlaid with coral or ivory, with even the exposed parts of the wooden ramrod being encased with silver.

=== Issues ===
Issues in the weapon were noted. When it was first made, it had a comparatively long range due to its long barrel, but by the 19th century its range became average, and by the 20th century it was completely outdated and comparatively short-ranged, causing bursts of smoke when fired, clearing after a long time. Most moukahla lacked bayonets, but organized units such as the Odjak of Algiers, the Odjak of Tunis, and to a certain extent, the Black Guard of Morocco did have bayonets equipped.

== Origin and usage ==
Thomas Hees and his Nephews Jan and Andries Hees and a Servant by Michiel van Musscher (1687). The Dutch diplomat Thomas Hees, who served in Algiers, Tunis, and Tripoli, depicted with Kabyle guns on the back wall.

The Moukahla was locally produced across the Maghreb region, in Morocco, Algeria, and Tunisia. They were the most widespread type of guns, being so widespread that every musket was called a moukahla, and european handbooks translated the english word "gun" as moukahla.

== Significance ==
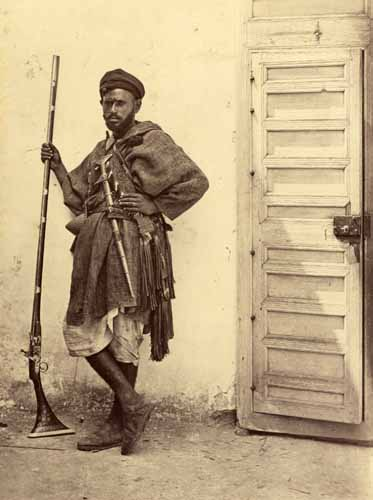
Rifian with Moukhala

The Moukahla played a major role in Maghrebi wars up until the early 20th century, being the most used and produced musket in the armies of the Kingdom of Morocco, the Deylik of Algiers and the Beylik of Tunis.

== See also ==
- The Jezail, a similar Afghan weapon
