= Swedish Land Pattern Musket =

Swedish musket

- Type: long gun
- Place of origin: Kingdom of Sweden

Service history
- In service: Royal Swedish Army (1550s—1860s)
- Used by: Swedish Empire (1550s—1721)
- Wars: Northern Seven Years' War; Russo-Swedish War 1590—95; War against Sigismund; Polish–Swedish War (1600—29); De la Gardie campaign Ingrian War; Kalmar War; Thirty Years' War; Torstenson War; First Bremian War; Little Northern War; Second Bremian War; Scanian War; War of the League of Augsburg; Great Northern War; The War of the Hats; Pomeranian War (part of the Seven Years' War theatre); Russo-Swedish War 1788—90; Theatre War; Barbary Coast War; Franco-Swedish War 1805—07; Finnish War; Dano-Swedish War of 1808—09; Anglo-Swedish War 1810—12; War of the Sixth Coalition; Campaign against Norway

Production history
- Manufacturer: Nerike Faktori; Jönköpings Gevärsfaktori; Söderhams Gevärsfaktori; Norrtelje Gevärsfaktori; Örebro Gevärsfaktori; Husqvarna Group; Carl Gustafs Stads Gevärsfaktori
- Produced: 1550s—1840s

Specifications
- Mass: 8,86–<10,97 lb
- Length: 57.63–~59.05 in
- Barrel length: 40.86–~43.50 in
- Cartridge: paper cartridge, buck and ball/solid shot (~.59–~.76), undersized to reduce the effects of powder fouling, cartridge weight: ~1.0864 oz
- Calibre: .63–~.81
- Barrels: 1 (smoothbore)
- Action: matchlock, snaphaunce lock, flintlock (doglock), percussion lock (doglock until Model 1840)
- Muzzle velocity: 984.252–1312.336 ft/s, max 1476.378–1640.420 ft/s
- Effective firing range: 100 yards (point target); 300 yards (area target)
- Maximum firing range: >500 yards
- Feed system: muzzle-loaded
- Sights: front sights open sights

The Swedish infantry musket, or the Swedish Land Pattern Musket, was a muzzle-loaded 0.63 (16.002 mm) to 0.81 (20.7mm)-inch calibre smoothbored long gun. These weapons were in service within the Royal Swedish Army from the mid-16th century until the mid-19th century.

== History ==
At the end of the 16th century, the Swedish military musket became a style-setter. Its style remained the same until about 1669 in most armies. In Sweden, its basic style lasted for many years—until the end of the 1680s. The matchlock was the dominant mechanism on the Swedish Army soldiers' muskets as well as among other European armed forces, and remained so until the latter half of the 1600s when the snaphaunce mechanism increasingly took over. But it was not until the flintlock mechanism as well as the bayonet had taken hold in earnest—around the turn of the 17th–18th centuries—that the matchlock became completely obsolete among the various squadrons within the Swedish Empire. However, some weapons equipped with wheellock mechanism were primarily reserved for the cavalry. The Swedish, purely warlike musket design remained in its basic form from Model 1696 until Model 1775. Before that, long guns – military as well as civilian – were produced in a variety of designs.

== Clear variants ==
=== Model 1680 ===
Matchlock Musket M1680

Swedish matchlock musket M1680, Swedish Army Museum in Stockholm.

=== Model 1688 ===
Snaphaunce Musket M1688

Swedish snapchaunce musket M1688, Swedish Army Museum in Stockholm.

=== Model 1696 ===
Swedish doglock musket M1696, Swedish Army Museum in Stockholm.

The flintlock carbine M1696 was the first bayonet-equipped.

=== Model 1762 ===
Krävan with the krävan-fitting was abandoned in favour of a third scouring stick-pipe, where a ramrod (now made of iron) instead rested and a fourth scouring stick-pipe (all now in brass) next to the chamber. And the stock was equipped with a nose cap, also in brass.

=== Model 1775 ===
With the manufacturing of the 1775 model, the pins holding the barrel in place were abandoned in favour of two scouring stick-pipe-bands with associated kräkor and a front barrel band nose cap with bow-shaped front sights in brass infused.

== See also ==
- List of wars involving Sweden
- Military history of Sweden
- Musket
