= Snaplock =

Type of firearm mechanism

A snaplock is a type of lock for firing a gun or is a gun fired by such a lock.

A snaplock ignites the (usually muzzle-loading) weapon's propellant by means of sparks produced when a spring-powered cock strikes a flint down on to a piece of hardened steel. The snaplock is therefore similar to the snaphance (sometimes classed as an advanced type of snaplock) and the later flintlock (see below).

In all snaplocks, the flint is held in a clamp at the end of a bent lever called the cock. When the gun is "cocked", the cock is held back, against the pressure of a spring, by a catch which is part of the trigger mechanism. When the trigger is pulled, the catch is released and the spring moves the cock rapidly forwards. The flint strikes a curved plate of hardened steel, eponymously called the "steel". The flint strikes from the steel a shower of white hot steel shavings (sparks) which fall towards the priming powder held in the flash pan. The flash from the pan's ignited primer travels (unless there is only a "flash in the pan") through the touch hole into the firing chamber at the rear of the barrel, and ignites the main charge of gunpowder.

Before the weapon is fired, the pan has a closed cover: the mechanism for opening this cover (i.e. manual or automatic) can affect whether the weapon is classed as a snaplock. In fact, the term snaplock may be used in three ways, as follows:

- The most general use of snaplock is for any lock which strikes flint against steel but which does not have the defining feature of a true flintlock. This is the frizzen, a single piece of metal which is a combined "steel" and self-opening pan cover.
- A more restrictive definition excludes the snaphaunce, more sophisticated weapons with a lateral sear and a pan cover, separate from the steel, that opens automatically.
- Sometimes the term is used only for specific Scandinavian, German, and Russian varieties of lock.

== Period of use ==
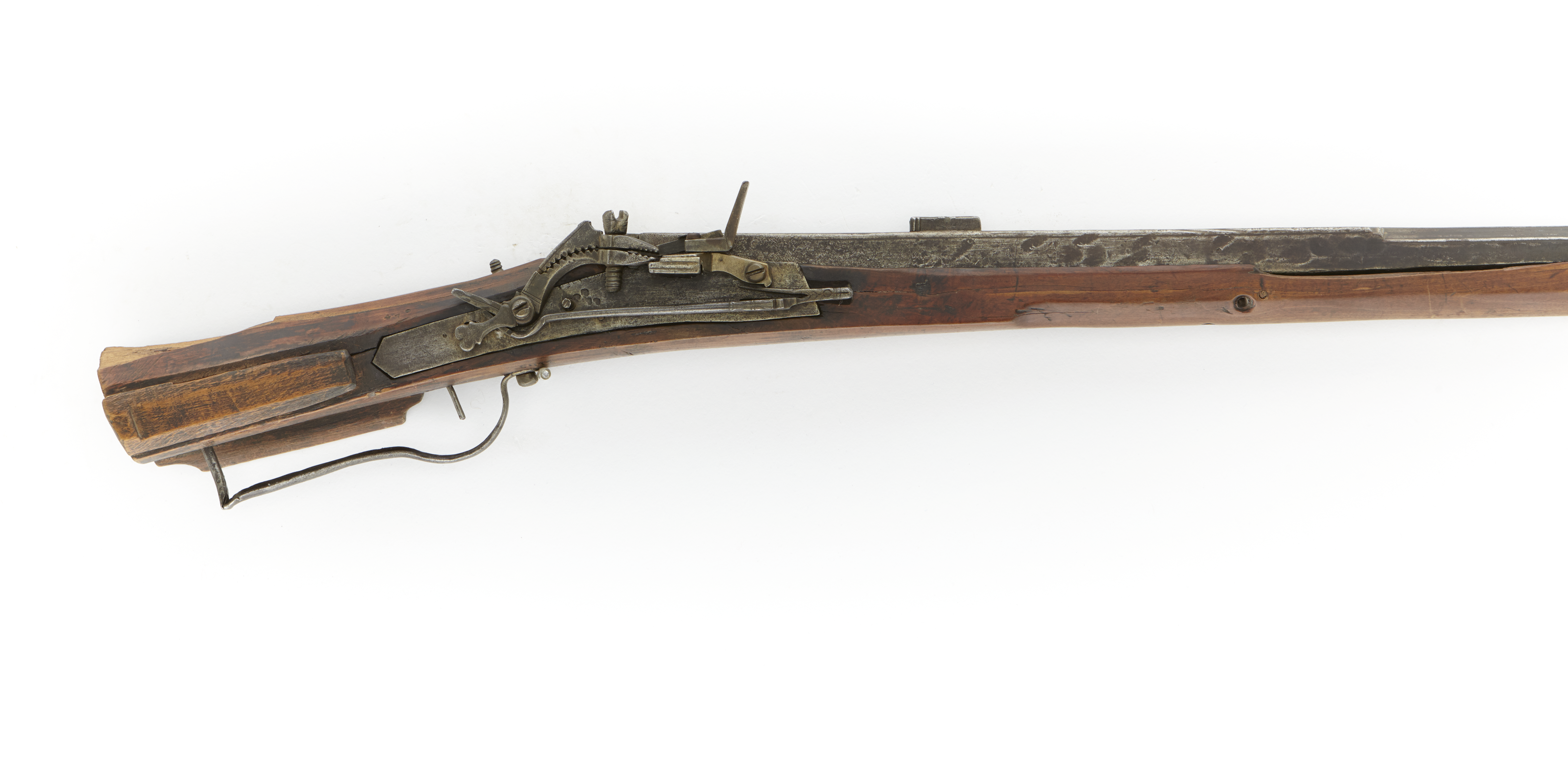
Swedish snaplock gun from the early 16th century

The origin of this proto-flintlock is unclear. The earliest source which could be speaking of a snaplock is an account from 1515 where a young man in Konstanz, Germany accidentally shot a girl with a pistol, thinking it could not go off due to the lack of a lit match. The pistol in question could be a snaplock but probably was a wheellock. Two years later is the letter-patent of the Emperor Maximilian I, banning the use of self-striking guns which ignite themselves. Dr. Arne Hoff argues that because "striking" is a very inaccurate description of what happens with a wheellock, it is probable that he was referring to a snaplock, thus making 1517 the likely first appearance of the weapon. City regulations from the Italian town of Ferrara from 1522 and 1634 forbid the carrying of certain firearms, probably snaplocks, and in 1547 a corresponding law in Florence describing the different locks speak of matchlock, wheellock, and a lock with stone and steel. In these cases it is more or less inarguable that the weapons in question are snaplocks. Arsenal accounts from 1547 in Sweden also explicitly mention snaplocks, and continued to do so in 1548 and beyond. The earliest surviving example of a Swedish snaplock is currently held in the Royal Armoury of Stockholm, probably one of a series of snaplock guns made in 1556 from German barrels and Swedish locks.

Compared to a matchlock, the snaplock could fire twice as many shots per minute due to requiring fewer steps to reload. Not requiring a match to be lit also made it easier to handle and more usable in a wider set of environments, such as in damp places.

It was cheap and easy to produce, and like all post-matchlock weapons, could be primed and loaded in advance and be fired at a moment's notice. It fell out of favor by about 1640, except in Sweden and Russia, where it lasted far longer.

== Safety ==
Snaplocks as a class did not have safety devices, but individual models could be prevented from inadvertent firing by different mechanisms:

- In the early models with a manual pan cover, the steel could be swung out of the path of the flint until just before firing; also, a closed pan cover would not allow the primer to ignite and could help keep the primer dry in misty conditions.
- On some models, an external hook attached to the lock plate could engage the tip of the "cocked" cock to prevent it from moving forwards.

Regional varieties include the Baltic Lock, the Russian Snaplock, and the Miquelet lock.

== See also ==
- Caplock mechanism
- Firearm
- Flintlock
- Hand cannon
- Matchlock
- Miquelet
- Percussion cap
- Snaphance
- Wheellock
- Doglock
