= Frizzen =

Piece of flintlock firearms

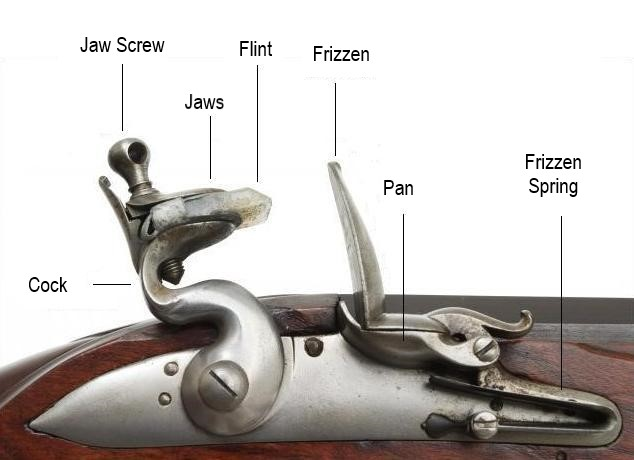
Flintlock mechanism

The frizzen, historically called the "hammer" or the steel, is an L-shaped piece of steel hinged at the front used in flintlock firearms. The frizzen is held in one of two positions, opened or closed, by a leaf spring. When closed, it is positioned over the flash pan so as to enclose a small priming charge of black powder next to the flash hole that is drilled through the barrel into which the main charge has been loaded. When the trigger is pulled, the cock, which holds a shaped piece of flint clamped in a set of jaws with a scrap of leather or thin piece of lead, snaps forward so the flint scrapes downward along the frizzen's face (historically called the 'battery'), throwing it forward into the open position and exposing the priming powder. The flint scraping along the steel causes a shower of sparks to be thrown into the pan, thereby igniting the priming powder therein and sending flames through the touch hole, which in turn ignites the main charge of black powder in the breech of the barrel, driving the projectile out of the muzzle.

The development of the frizzen which combines both the "battery" or striking surface and separate pan cover on the less advanced "snaphaunce" lock is often credited to French gun maker Marin le Bourgeoys around 1610. He may have been influenced by the Spanish "miquelet" lock that utilized a similarly shaped frizzen at least two decades earlier.

It is important that the metal of the frizzen be brought to a sufficiently high carbon content by the process of carburization, wherein carbonaceous materials such as horn, hooves, and leather scraps were wrapped around the frizzen in a clay or metallic crucible which was then placed into a forge or other furnace for several hours to raise the carbon content of the steel through the process of diffusion. This process increases the carbon content of the iron in a layer close to the surface of the frizzen so that it hardens the outside while the center remains relatively ductile so as to prevent through-cracking. Through the wear of continued use a frizzen will lose its ability to create enough sparks to reliably ignite the powder, thereby necessitating that it be re-hardened or replaced.

== See also ==
- Glossary of firearms terminology
- Case hardening
