= Flash pan =

Firearm component

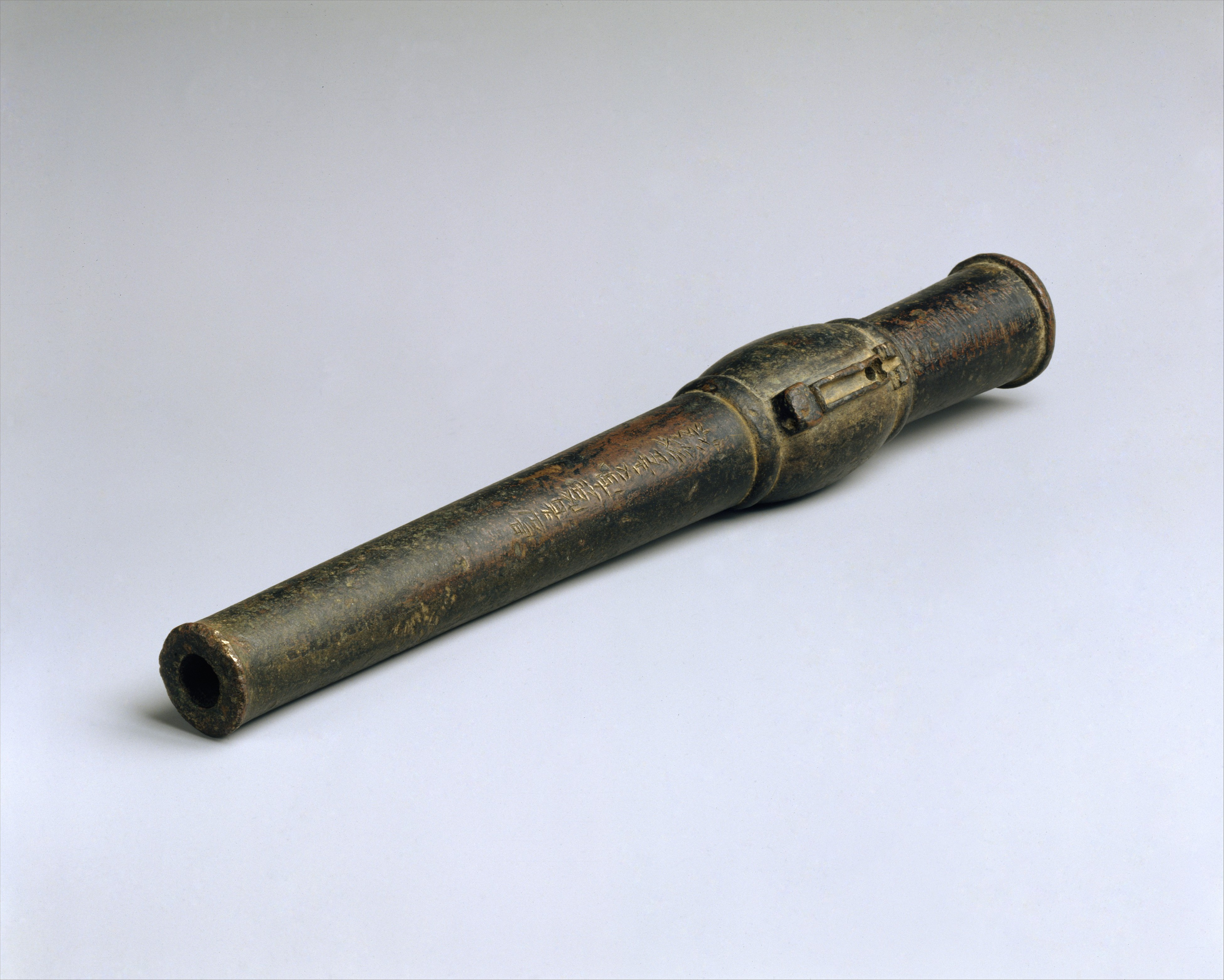
A Chinese handcannon dated to 1424 with the flash pan adopted from Vietnamese handcannons after the Ming invasion of Vietnam in 1407

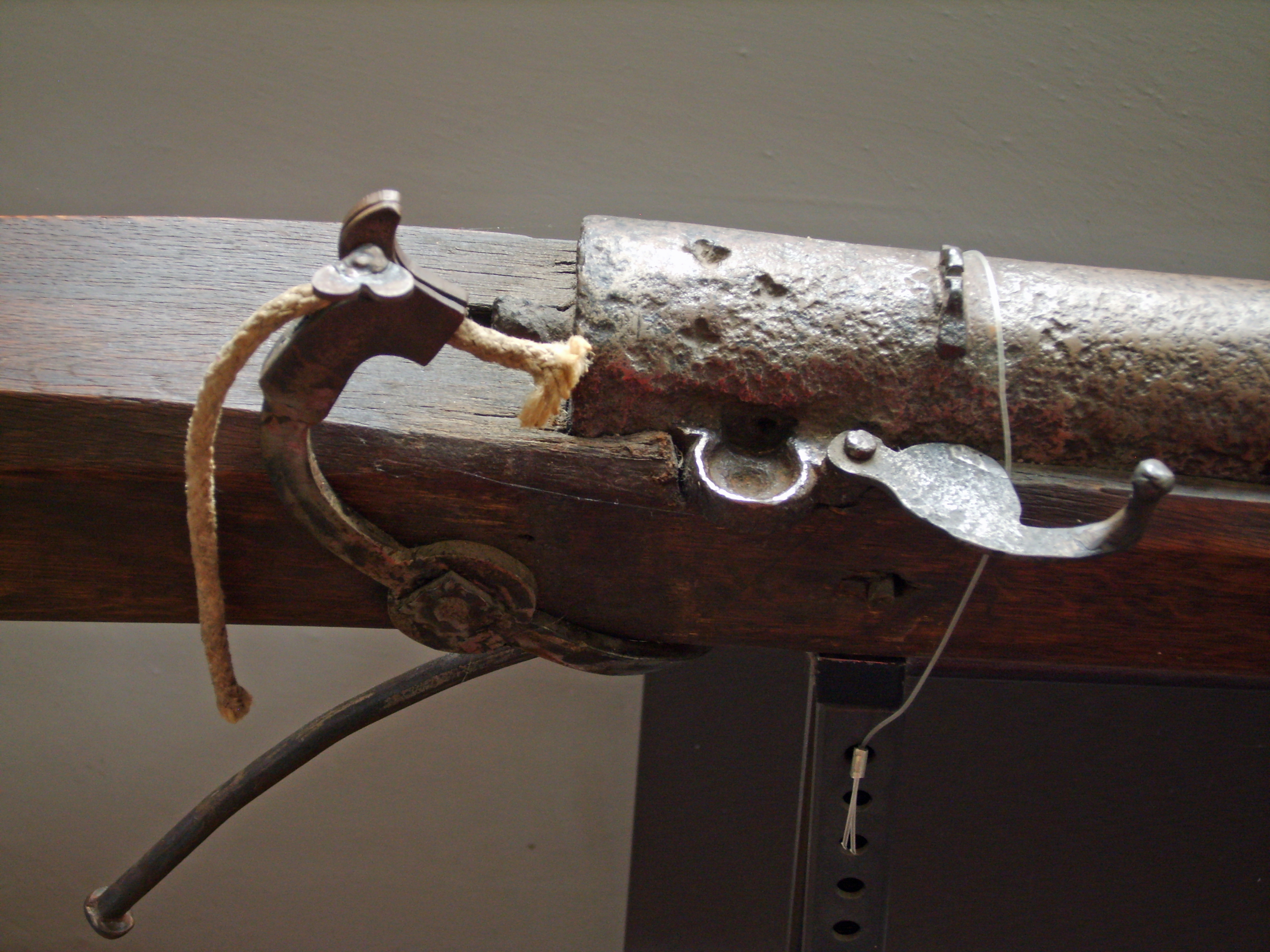
A matchlock firearm with its flash pan visible at center as a U-shaped depression

The flash pan or priming pan is a small receptacle for priming powder, found next to the touch hole on muzzle-loading guns. Flash pans are found on gonnes, matchlocks, wheellocks, snaplocks, snaphances, and flintlocks.

== Development ==
The flash pan probably first appeared on Vietnamese handcannons prior to 1407 to facilitate the ignition of the priming powder and keep it from getting wet in rainy weather. The flash pan was at first attached to the gun barrel, but was later moved to the lock plate of the gun. A small amount of finely ground gunpowder is placed in the flash pan and ignited. The flash of flame travels through the touch hole igniting the main charge of propellant inside the barrel. Unlike the cannon, it was not necessary (or desirable) to place priming in the touch hole itself. The flash alone, and not particles of burning powder, was enough to ignite the main charge.

== "Flash in the pan" ==
The ignition of the main charge from the flash pan was not a guaranteed operation, however, and sometimes it failed. In those cases the spark would flash in the pan, but the gun would fail to fire. This led by the end of the 17th century to the expression "flash in the pan" to mean a failure after a brief and showy start, or momentary sensation of no real importance.

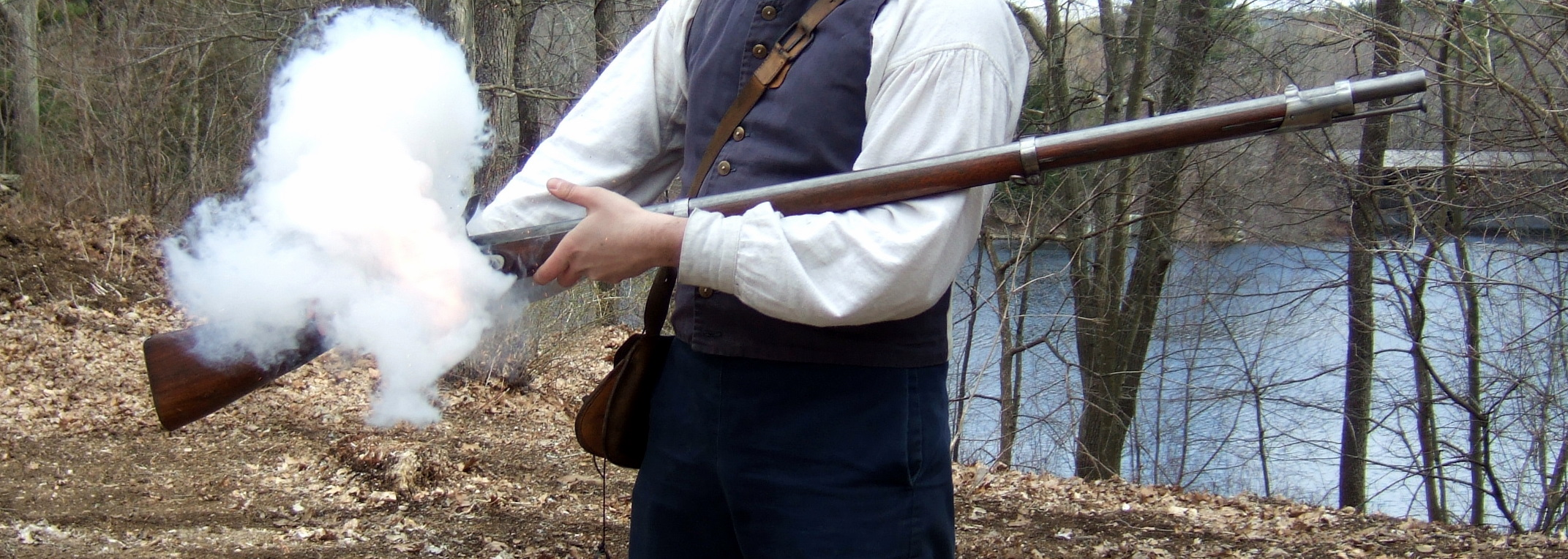
Flash in the pan

== See also ==
- Miquelet lock
- Glossary of firearms terminology
