= Flintlock =

Firearm with flint-striking ignition

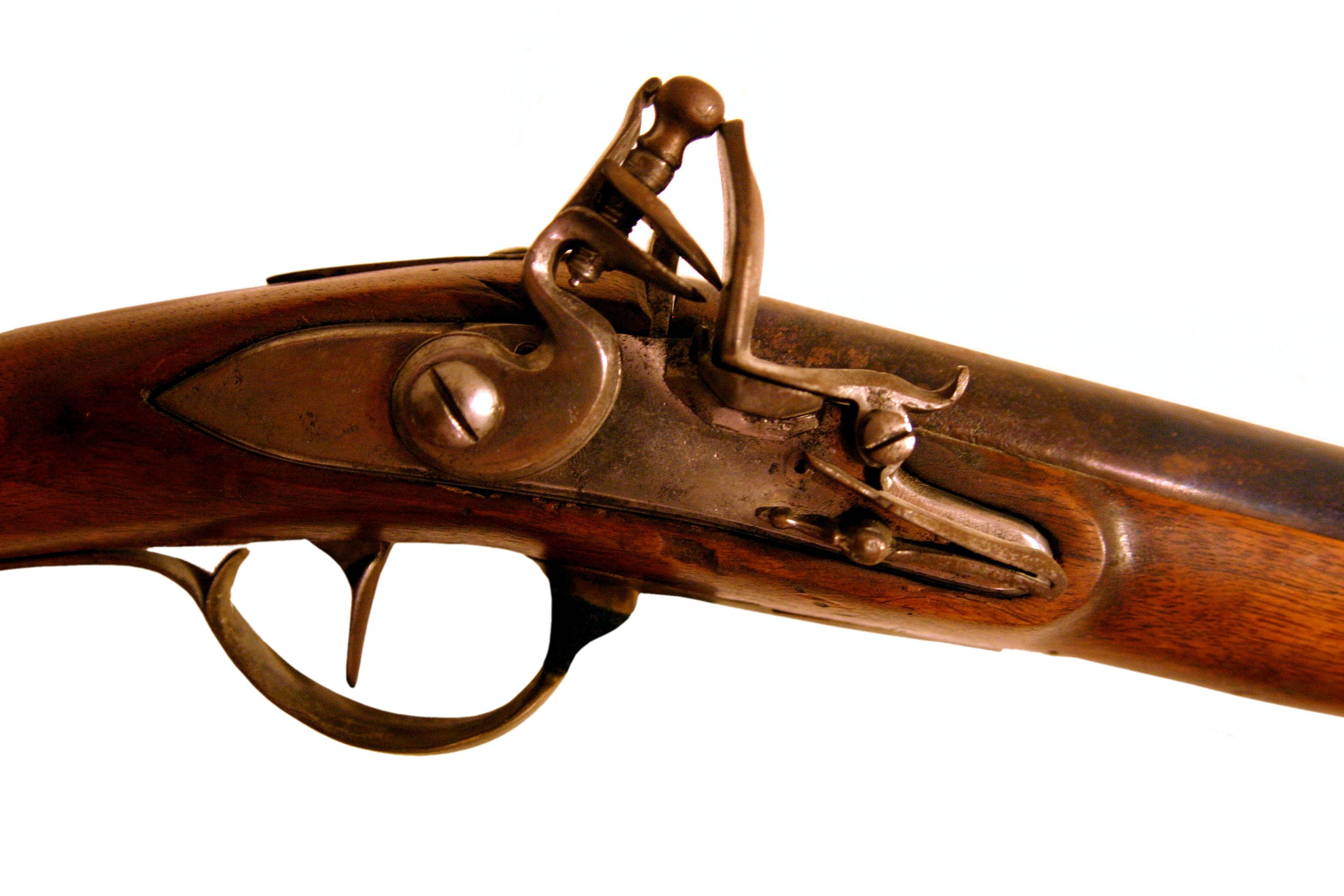
Flintlock of an 18th-century hunting rifle, with flint missing.

Flintlock is a general term for any firearm that uses a flint-striking ignition mechanism, the first of which appeared in France by Marin le Bourgeoys between 1610 and 1615. The term may also apply to a particular form of the mechanism itself, also known as the true flintlock, that was introduced in the early 17th century, and gradually replaced earlier firearm-ignition technologies, such as the matchlock, the wheellock, and the earlier flintlock mechanisms such as the snaplock and snaphaunce.

The true flintlock continued to be in common use for over two centuries, replaced by the percussion cap and, later, the cartridge-based systems in the early-to-mid 19th century. Although long superseded by modern firearms, flintlock weapons enjoy continuing popularity with black-powder shooting enthusiasts.

== History ==
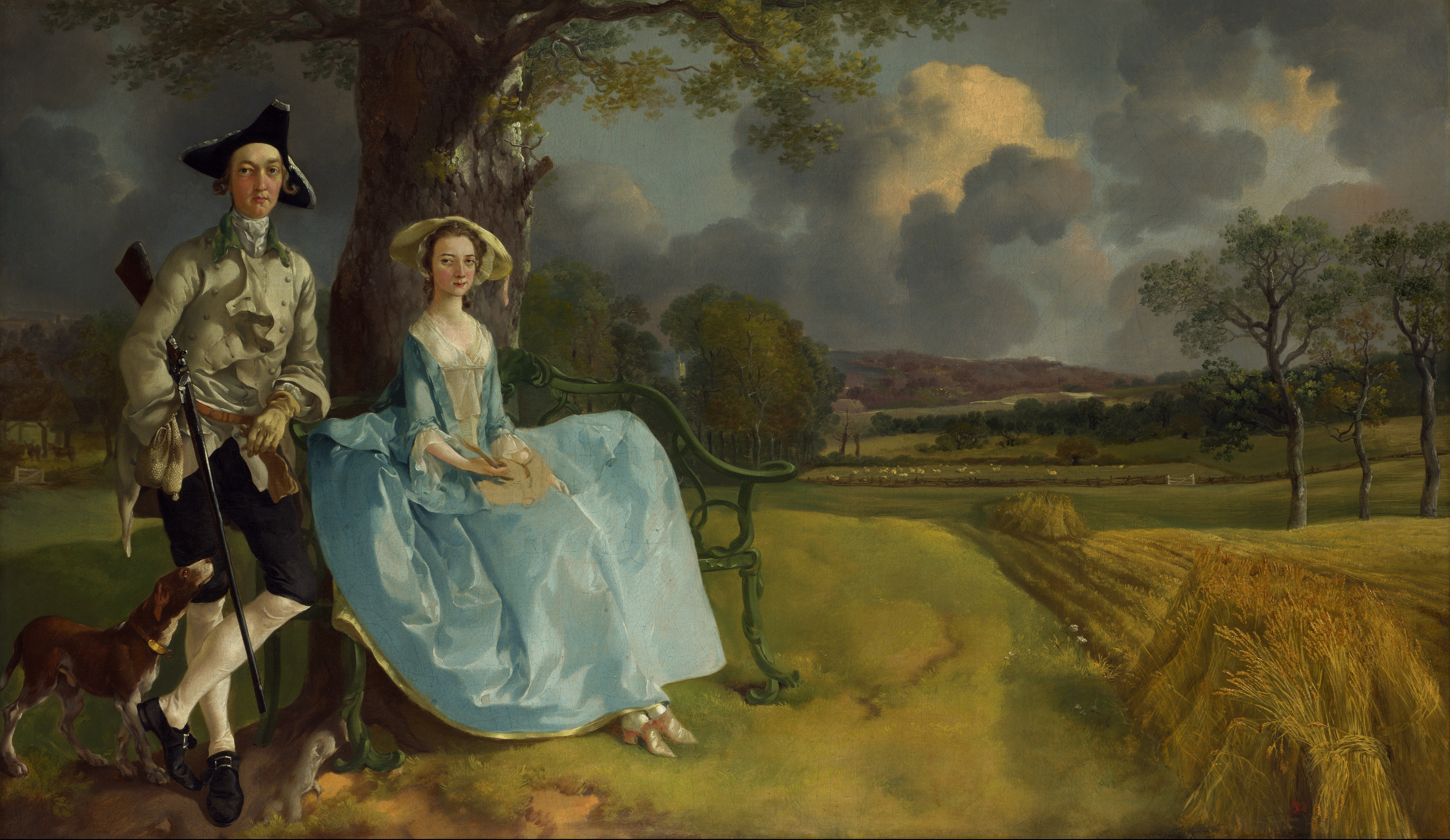
An English gentleman c. 1750 with his flintlock muzzle-loading sporting rifle, in a painting by Thomas Gainsborough.

French court gunsmith Marin le Bourgeoys made a firearm incorporating a flintlock mechanism for King Louis XIII shortly after his accession to the throne in 1610. However, firearms using some form of flint ignition mechanism had already been in use for over half a century. The first proto-flintlock was the snaplock, which was probably invented shortly before 1517 and was inarguably in use by 1547. Their cost and delicacy limited their use; for example around 1662, only one in six firearms used by the English Army was a snaphaunce, the rest being matchlocks. The development of firearm lock mechanisms had proceeded from the matchlock to wheellock to the earlier flintlocks (snaplock, snaphance, miquelet, and doglock) in the previous two centuries, and each type had been an improvement, contributing design features to later firearms which were useful. Le Bourgeoys fitted these various features together to create what became known as the flintlock or true flintlock.

Flintlock firearms differed from the then more common and cheaper to manufacture matchlock arms in that they were fired by the spark of the flint against the powder charge rather than by the direct application of a lighted length of cord or (as it was then called) "match". This was particularly important with men armed with muskets guarding artillery trains where a lighted cord ("match") would have been a dangerous fire hazard. Such men armed with these flintlocks were called "fusiliers" as flintlocks were then called "fusils" from the French word for such. Various types were in use by elite infantry, scouts, artillery guards (as noted), and private individuals in European armies throughout most of the 16th and 17th centuries, though matchlocks continued to overwhelmingly outnumber them. The early Dutch States Army used flintlocks on an unusually large scale, issuing snaphances to its infantry in the 1620s and true flintlocks by 1640. While it is known that the Dutch were the first power to adopt the flintlock as the standard infantry weapon, the exact chronology of the transition is uncertain.

The new flintlock system quickly became popular and was known and used in various forms throughout Europe by 1630, although older flintlock systems continued to be used for some time. Examples of early flintlock muskets can be seen in the painting "Marie de' Medici as Bellona" by Rubens (painted around 1622–1625). These flintlocks were in use alongside older firearms such as matchlocks, wheellocks, and miquelet locks for nearly a hundred years. The last major European power to standardize the flintlock was the Holy Roman Empire, when in 1702 the Emperor instituted a new regulation that all matchlocks were to be converted or scrapped. The "true" flintlock was less expensive to manufacture than earlier flintlocks, which along with general economic development allowed every European soldier to have one by the 18th century. Compared to the earlier matchlock, flintlocks could be reloaded roughly twice as fast, misfired far less often, and were easier to use in various environments due to the fact that they did not require a lit match. This instantly changed the calculus of infantry combat; by one calculation, a formation equipped entirely with flintlocks (with paper cartridges) could output ten times as many shots in an equivalent period of time as a typical early 17th-century pike and shot formation equipped with matchlocks (pike:shot ratio of 3:2).

Various breech-loading flintlocks were developed starting around 1650. The most popular action has a barrel that was unscrewed from the rest of the gun. This is more practical on pistols because of the shorter barrel length. This type is known as a Queen Anne pistol because it was during her reign that it became popular (although it was actually introduced in the reign of King William III). Another type has a removable screw plug set into the side or top or bottom of the barrel. A large number of sporting rifles were made with this system, as it allowed easier loading compared with muzzle loading with a tight-fitting bullet and patch.

One of the more successful variants was the system built by Isaac de la Chaumette starting in 1704. The barrel could be opened by three revolutions of the triggerguard, to which it was attached. The plug stayed attached to the barrel and the ball and powder were loaded from the top. This system was improved in the 1770s by Colonel Patrick Ferguson and 100 experimental rifles used in the American Revolutionary War. The only two flintlock breech loaders to be produced in quantity were the Hall and the Crespi. The first was invented by John Hall and patented c. 1817. It was issued to the U.S. Army as the Model 1819 Hall Breech Loading Rifle.

The Hall rifles and carbines were loaded using a combustible paper cartridge inserted into the upward tilting breechblock. Hall rifles leaked gas from the often poorly fitted action. The same problem affected the muskets produced by Giuseppe Crespi and adopted by the Austrian Army in 1771. Nonetheless, the Crespi System was experimented with by the British during the Napoleonic Wars, and percussion Halls guns saw service in the American Civil War.

Flintlock weapons were commonly used until the mid 19th century, when they were replaced by percussion lock systems. Even though they have long been considered obsolete, flintlock weapons continue to be produced today by manufacturers such as Pedersoli, Euroarms, and Armi Sport. Not only are these weapons used by modern re-enactors, but they are also used for hunting, as many U.S. states have dedicated hunting seasons for black-powder weapons, which includes both flintlock and percussion lock weapons.

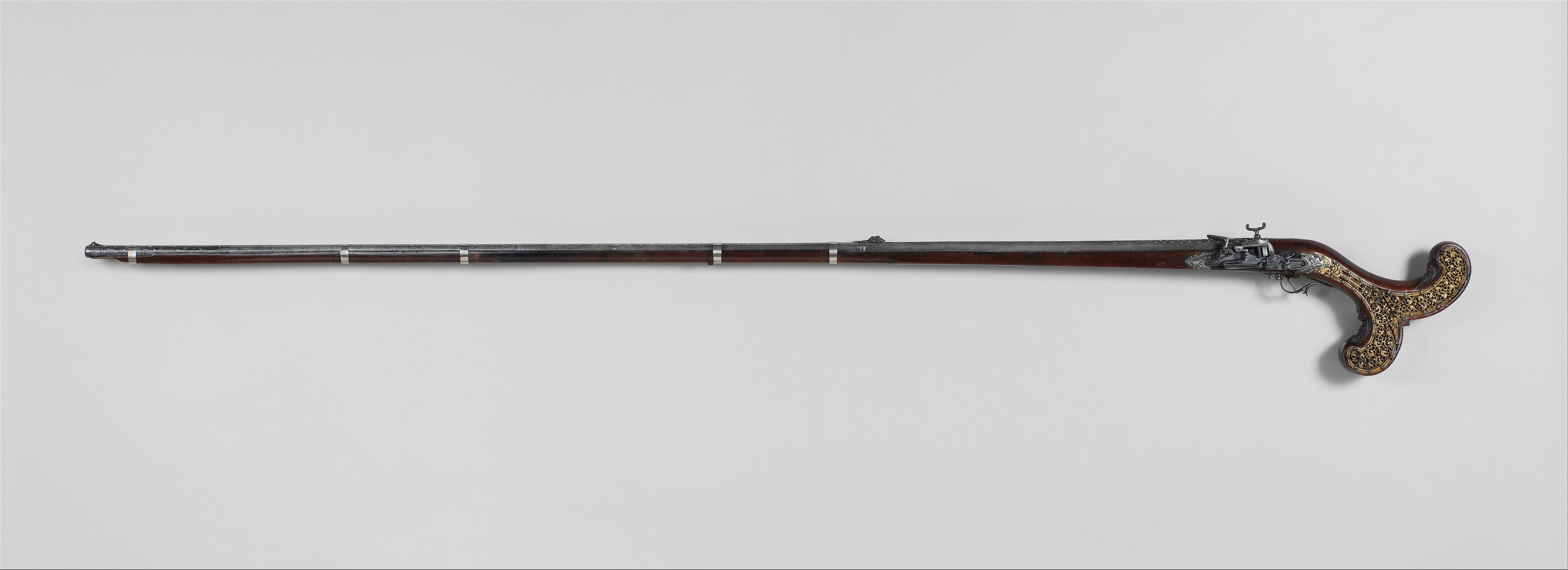
A heavily decorated 18th-century Bondikula flintlock musket from the Kingdom of Kandy is an example of flintlock usage in Asia

Even after it became dominant in Europe, the flintlock did not proliferate globally. Large Flint reserves are available only in Europe and North America. Flintlocks were far more complicated to manufacture than simple matchlocks, thus less-developed countries continued to use the latter into the mid 19th century, long after Europe had made the switch in the late 17th. In the Indian subcontinent, the natively-manufactured toradar matchlock was the most common firearm type until about 1830. The Sinhalese Kingdoms locally produced flintlock mechanisms for long-barreled muskets known as the Bondikula known for its unique bifurcated butt and heavy ornamentation. These were widely used during the 17th-18th centuries. In China, some flintlocks had been acquired and illustrated by 1635, but they were not adopted by the army. An 1836 British report about the Qing dynasty's military strength noted that all Chinese firearms were "ill-made" matchlocks, with no flintlocks or any of the other "tribes of firearm."

Southeast Asia was in a similar position to China and India. The Vietnamese were introduced to flintlocks by the Dutch in the 1680s, and bought some from European merchants. Flintlocks began to appear in Javanese arsenals in the first decade of the eighteenth century and the Dutch began to supply flintlocks to the rulers of Surabaya in the 1710s and 1720s. But matchlocks remained prominent until the mid-19th century, and the Southeast Asian states generally lacked the ability to natively produce the flintlock. The Jiaozhi arquebus was still the main firearm of Nguyễn dynasty musketeers at the end of the 18th century. The Burmese only obtained a majority of flintlocks in their armed forces by the 1860s (the Burmese kings demanded to be paid in surplus European muskets instead of currency), at which point the European powers had already moved on to percussion cap firearms.

== Subtypes ==
Flintlocks may be any type of small arm: long gun or pistol, smoothbore or rifle, muzzleloader or breechloader.

=== Pistols ===
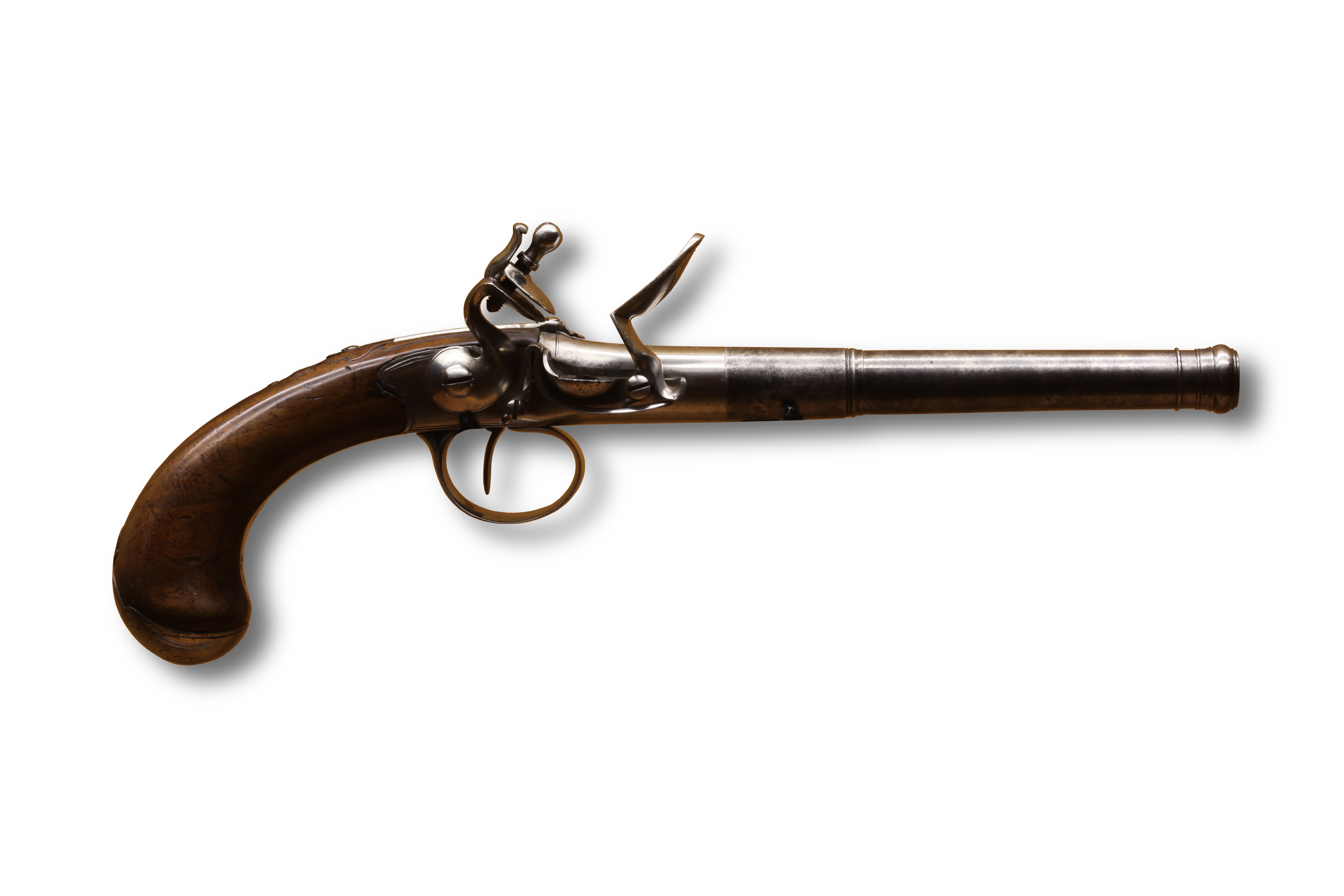
Flintlock pistol in "Queen Anne" layout, made in Lausanne by Galliard, c. 1760. On display at Morges military museum.

Flintlock pistols were used as self-defense weapons and as a military arm. Their effective range was short, and they were frequently used as an adjunct to a sword or cutlass. Pistols were usually smoothbore although some rifled pistols were produced.

Flintlock pistols came in a variety of sizes and styles which often overlap and are not well defined, many of the names we use having been applied by collectors and dealers long after the pistols were obsolete. The smallest were less than 6 inches (15 cm) long and the largest were over 20 inches (51 cm). From around the beginning of the 1700s the larger pistols got shorter, so that by the late 1700s the largest would be around 16 inches (41 cm) long. The smallest would fit into a typical pocket or a hand warming muff and could easily be carried.

The largest sizes would be carried in holsters across a horse's back just ahead of the saddle. In-between sizes included the coat pocket pistol, or coat pistol, which would fit into a large pocket, the coach pistol, meant to be carried on or under the seat of a coach in a bag or box, and belt pistols, sometimes equipped with a hook designed to slip over a belt or waistband. Larger pistols were called horse pistols. Arguably the most elegant of the pistol designs was the Queen Anne pistol, which was made in all sizes.

Arguably the high point of the mechanical development of the flintlock pistol was the British duelling pistol; it was highly reliable, water resistant and accurate. External decoration was minimal but craftsmanship was evident, and the internal works were often finished to a higher degree of craftsmanship than the exterior. Dueling pistols were the size of the horse pistols of the late 1700s, around 16 inches (41 cm) long and were usually sold in pairs along with accessories in a wooden case with compartments for each piece.

=== Muskets ===
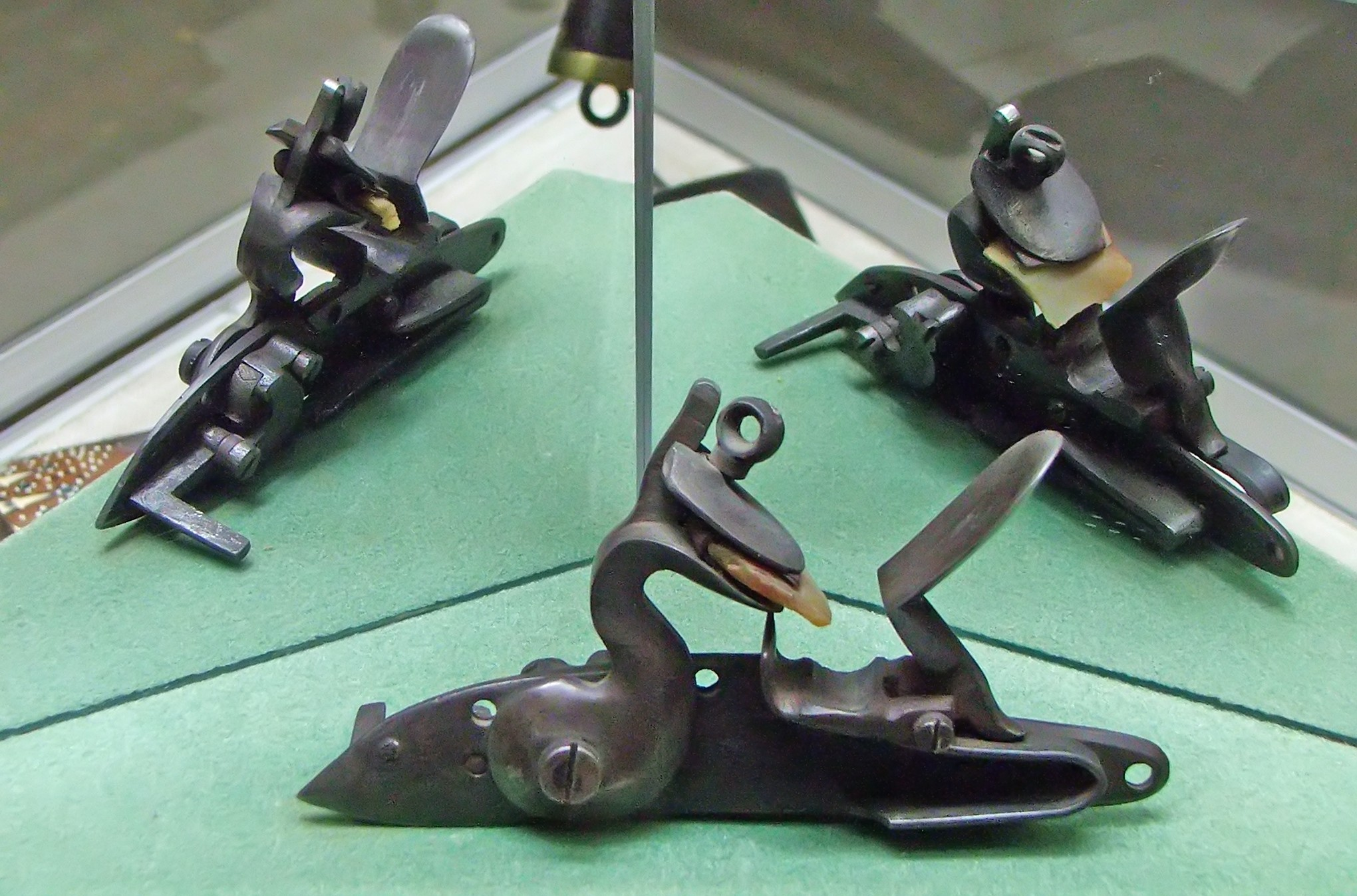
A flintlock mechanism, National Army Museum, New Zealand, 2008

Flintlock muskets were the mainstay of European armies between 1660 and 1840. A musket was a muzzle-loading smoothbore long gun that was loaded with a round lead ball, but it could also be loaded with shot for hunting. For military purposes, the weapon was loaded with ball, or a mixture of ball with several large shot (called buck and ball), and had an effective range of about 75–100 m (246–328 ft). Smoothbore weapons that were designed for hunting birds were called "fowlers." Flintlock muskets tended to be of large caliber and usually had no choke, allowing them to fire full-caliber balls.

Military flintlock muskets tended to weigh approximately 10 pounds (4.53 kg), as heavier weapons were found to be too cumbersome, and lighter weapons were not rugged or heavy enough to be used in hand-to-hand combat. They were usually designed to be fitted with a bayonet. On flintlocks, the bayonet played primarily a deterrence role - casualty lists from several battles in the 18th century showed that fewer than 2% of wounds were caused by bayonets.

Antoine-Henri Jomini, a celebrated military author of the Napoleonic period who served in numerous armies during that period, stated that the majority of bayonet charges in the open resulted with one side fleeing before any contacts were made. Flintlock weapons were not used like modern rifles. They tended to be fired in mass volleys, followed by bayonet charges in which the weapons were used much like the pikes that they replaced. Because they were also used as pikes, military flintlocks tended to be approximately 5–6 feet (150–180 cm) in length (without the bayonet attached), and used bayonets that were approximately 18–22 inches (46–56 cm) in length.

=== Rifles ===
In Germany, the Jäger rifle was developed by the late 18th century. It was used for hunting, and in a military context, skirmishing and by specialist marksmen.

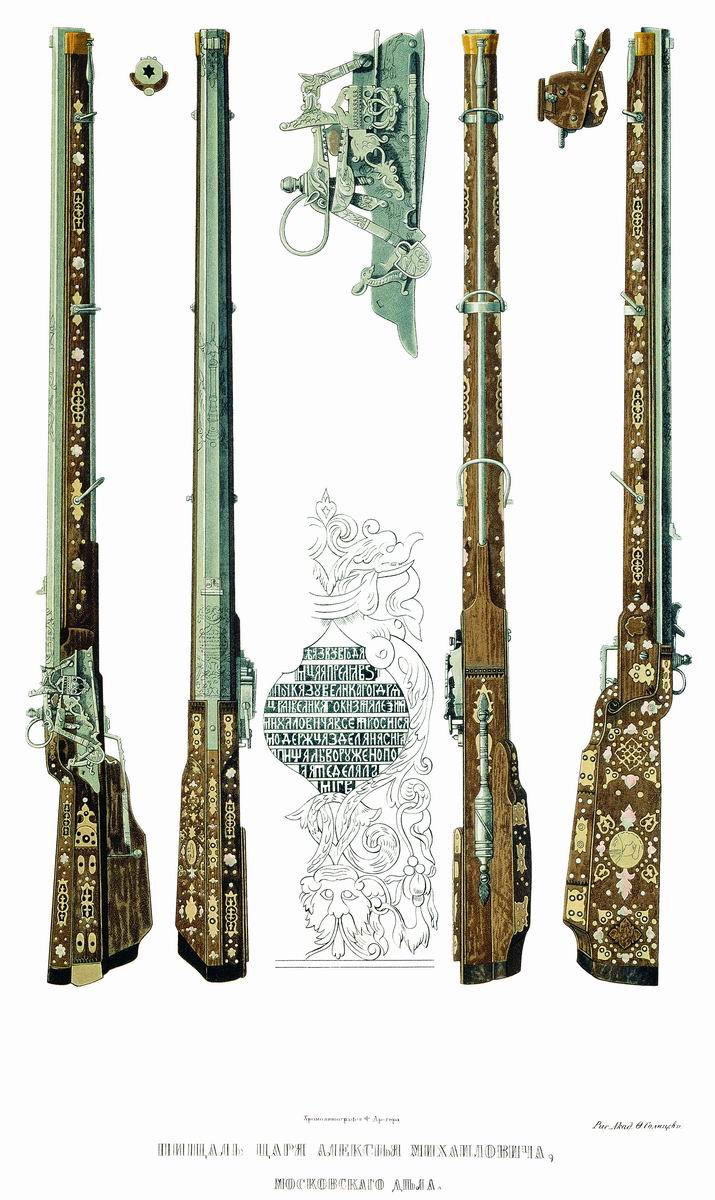
Russian flintlock rifle made in 1654 by master Grigory Viatkin.

In the United States, the small game hunting long rifle ("Pennsylvania rifle" or "Kentucky rifle") was developed in southeastern Pennsylvania in the early 1700s. Based on the Jäger rifle, but with a much longer barrel, these were exceptionally accurate for their time, and had an effective range of approximately 250 m (820 ft). They tended to fire smaller caliber rounds, with calibers in the range of .32–.45 in (8.1–11.4 mm) being the most common - hence being sometimes referred to as a "pea rifle."

The Jezail was a military long flintlock rifle, developed near and popular throughout Afghanistan, India, Central Asia and parts of the Middle East.

However, while European military tactics remained based on loosely-aimed mass volleys, most of their flintlocks were still smoothbore - as the spiral grooves of rifling made rifles take more time to load, and after repeated shots black powder tended to foul the barrels.

Rifled flintlocks saw most military use by sharpshooters, skirmishers, and other support units. While by the late 18th century there were increasing efforts to take advantage of the rifle for military purposes, with specialist rifle units such as the King's Royal Rifle Corps of 1756 and Rifle Brigade (Prince Consort's Own), smoothbores predominated until the advent of the Minié ball – by which time the percussion cap had made the flintlock obsolete.

=== Multishot flintlock weapons ===
==== Multiple barrels ====
Because of the time needed to reload (even experts needed 15 seconds to reload a smooth-bore, muzzle-loading musket), flintlocks were sometimes produced with two, three, four or more barrels for multiple shots. These designs tended to be costly to make and were often unreliable and dangerous. While weapons like double barreled shotguns were reasonably safe, weapons like the pepperbox revolver would sometimes fire all barrels simultaneously, or would sometimes just explode in the user's hand. It was often cheaper, safer, and more reliable to carry several single-shot weapons instead.

==== Single barrel ====
Some repeater rifles, multishot single barrel pistols, and multishot single barrel revolvers were also made. Notable are the Puckle gun, Mortimer, Kalthoff, Michele Lorenzoni, Abraham Hill, Cookson pistols, the Jennings repeater and the Elisha Collier revolver.

== Drawbacks ==
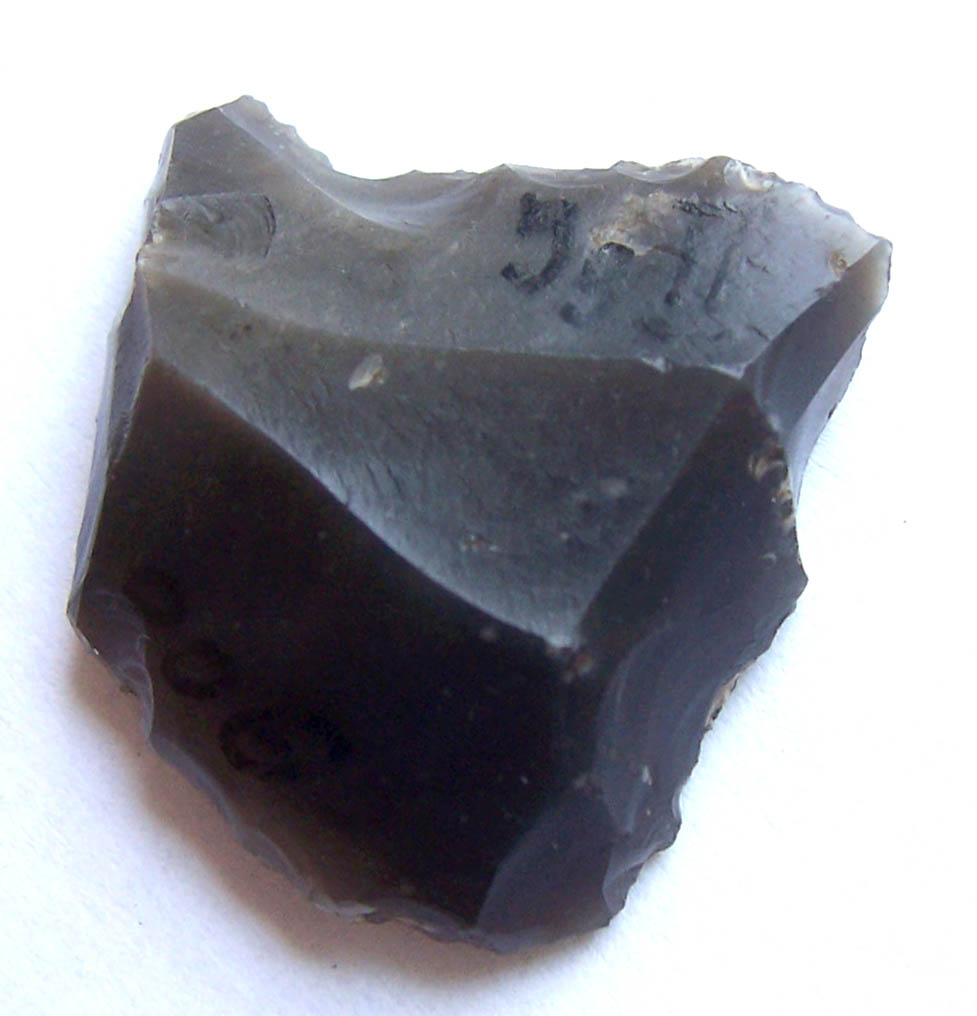
The flint for flintlock – 17th century

Flintlocks were prone to many problems compared to modern weapons. Misfires were common. The flint had to be properly maintained, as a dull or poorly knapped piece of flint would not make as much of a spark and would increase the misfire rate dramatically. Moisture was a problem, since moisture on the frizzen or damp powder would prevent the weapon from firing. This rendered flintlock weapons unusable in rainy or damp weather. Some armies attempted to remedy this by using a leather cover over the lock mechanism, but this proved to have only limited success.

Accidental firing was also a problem for flintlocks. A burning ember left in the barrel could ignite the next powder charge as it was loaded. This could be avoided by waiting between shots for any leftover residue to completely burn. Running a lubricated cleaning patch down the barrel with the ramrod would also extinguish any embers, and would clean out some of the barrel fouling as well. Soldiers on the battlefield could not take these precautions. They had to fire as quickly as possible, often firing three to four rounds per minute. Loading and firing at such a pace dramatically increased the risk of an accidental discharge.

When a flintlock was fired it sprayed a shower of sparks forwards from the muzzle and another sideways out of the flash-hole. One reason for firing in volleys was to ensure that one man's sparks did not ignite the next man's powder as he was in the act of loading.

An accidental frizzen strike could also ignite the main powder charge, even if the pan had not yet been primed. Some modern flintlock users will still place a leather cover over the frizzen while loading as a safety measure to prevent this from happening. However, this does slow down the loading time, which prevented safety practices such as this from being used on the battlefields of the past.

The black powder used in flintlocks would quickly foul the barrel, which was a problem for rifles and for smooth bore weapons that fired a tighter fitting round for greater accuracy. Each shot would add more fouling to the barrel, making the weapon more and more difficult to load. Even if the barrel was badly fouled, the flintlock user still had to properly seat the round all the way to the breech of the barrel. Leaving an air gap in between the powder and the round (known as "short starting") was very dangerous, and could cause the barrel to explode.

Handling loose black powder was also dangerous, for obvious reasons. Powder measures, funnels, and other pieces of equipment were usually made out of brass to reduce the risk of creating a spark, which could ignite the powder. Soldiers often used pre-made paper cartridges, which unlike modern cartridges were not inserted whole into the weapon. Instead, they were tubes of paper that contained a pre-measured amount of powder and a lead ball. Although paper cartridges were safer to handle than loose powder, their primary purpose was not safety related at all. Instead, paper cartridges were used mainly because they sped up the loading process. A soldier did not have to take the time to measure out powder when using a paper cartridge. He simply tore open the cartridge, used a small amount of powder to prime the pan, then dumped the remaining powder from the cartridge into the barrel.

The black powder used in flintlocks contained sulfur. If the weapon was not cleaned after use, sulfur dioxide in the powder residue would absorb moisture, producing sulfuric and sulfonic acids which would erode the inside of the gun barrel and the lock mechanism. Flintlock weapons that were not properly cleaned and maintained would corrode to the point of being destroyed.

Most flintlocks were produced at a time before modern manufacturing processes became common. Even in mass-produced weapons, parts were often handmade. If a flintlock became damaged, or parts wore out due to age, the damaged parts were not easily replaced. Parts would often have to be filed down, hammered into shape, or otherwise modified so that they would fit, making repairs much more difficult. Machine-made, interchangeable parts began to be used only shortly before flintlocks were replaced by caplocks.

== Method of operation ==
Flintlock firing

Sparks generated by a flintlock mechanism

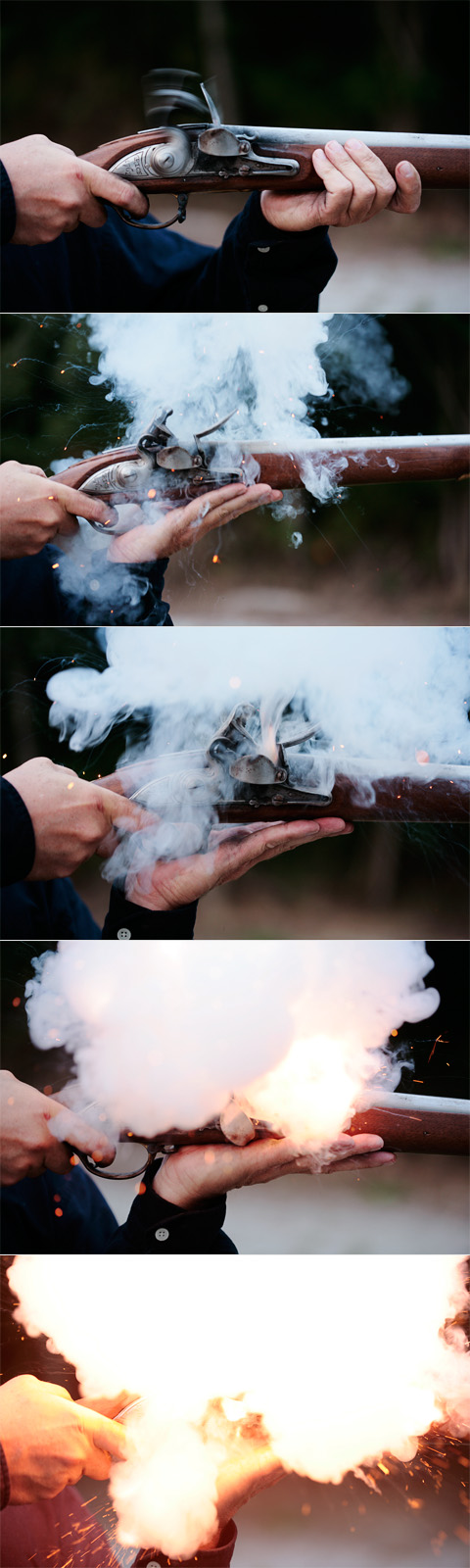
Flintlock firearm ignition sequence

- A cock tightly holding a sharp piece of flint is rotated to half-cock, where the sear falls into a safety notch on the tumbler, preventing an accidental discharge.
- The operator loads the gun, usually from the muzzle end, with black powder from a powder flask, followed by lead shot, a round lead ball, usually wrapped in a piece of paper or a cloth patch, all rammed down with a ramrod that is usually stored on the underside of the barrel. Wadding between the charge and the ball was often used in earlier guns.
- The flash pan is primed with a small amount of very finely ground gunpowder, and the flashpan lid or frizzen is closed.

The gun is now in a "primed and loaded" state, and this is how it would typically be carried while hunting or if going into battle.

To fire:

- The cock is further rotated from half-cock to full-cock, releasing the safety lock on the cock.
- The gun is leveled and the trigger is pulled, releasing the cock holding the flint.
- The flint strikes the frizzen, a piece of steel on the priming pan lid, opening it and exposing the priming powder.
- The contact between flint and frizzen produces a shower of sparks (burning pieces of the metal) that is directed into the gunpowder in the flashpan.
- The powder ignites, and the flash passes through a small hole in the barrel (called a vent or touchhole) that leads to the combustion chamber where it ignites the main powder charge, and the gun discharges.

The British Army and the Continental Army both used paper cartridges to load their weapons. The powder charge and ball were instantly available to the soldier inside this small paper envelope. To load a flintlock weapon using a paper cartridge, a soldier would

- move the cock to the half-cock position;
- tear the cartridge open with his teeth;
- fill the flashpan half-full with powder, directing it toward the vent;
- close the frizzen to keep the priming charge in the pan;
- pour the rest of the powder down the muzzle and stuff the cartridge in after it;
- take out the ramrod and ram the ball and cartridge all the way to the breech;
- replace the ramrod;
- shoulder the weapon.

The weapon can then be fully cocked and fired.

== Cultural impact ==
Firearms using some form of flintlock mechanism were the main form of firearm for over 200 years. It was not until Reverend Alexander John Forsyth invented a rudimentary percussion cap system in 1807 that the flintlock system began to decline in popularity. The percussion ignition system was more weatherproof and reliable than the flintlock, but the transition from flintlock to percussion cap was a slow one, and the percussion system was not widely used until around 1830. The Model 1840 U.S. musket was the last flintlock firearm produced for the U.S. military. However, obsolete flintlocks saw action in the earliest days of the American Civil War. For example, in 1861, the Army of Tennessee had over 2,000 flintlock muskets in service.

As a result of the flintlock's long active life, it left lasting marks on the language and on drill and parade. Terms such as: "lock, stock and barrel", "going off half-cocked" and "flash in the pan" remain current in English. In addition, the weapon positions and drill commands that were originally devised to standardize carrying, loading and firing a flintlock weapon remain the standard for drill and display (see manual of arms).

== Gallery ==
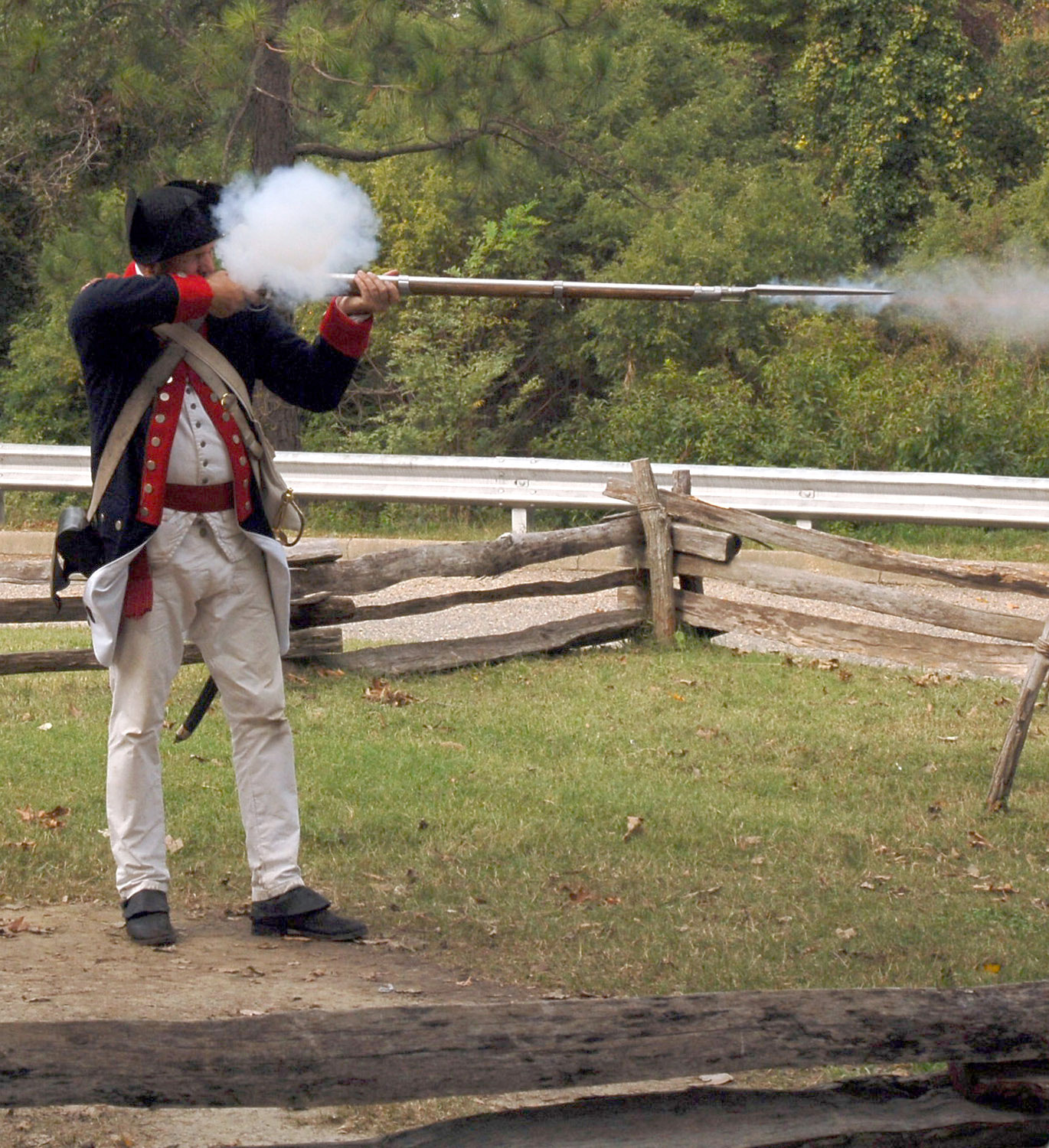
A flintlock musket being fired

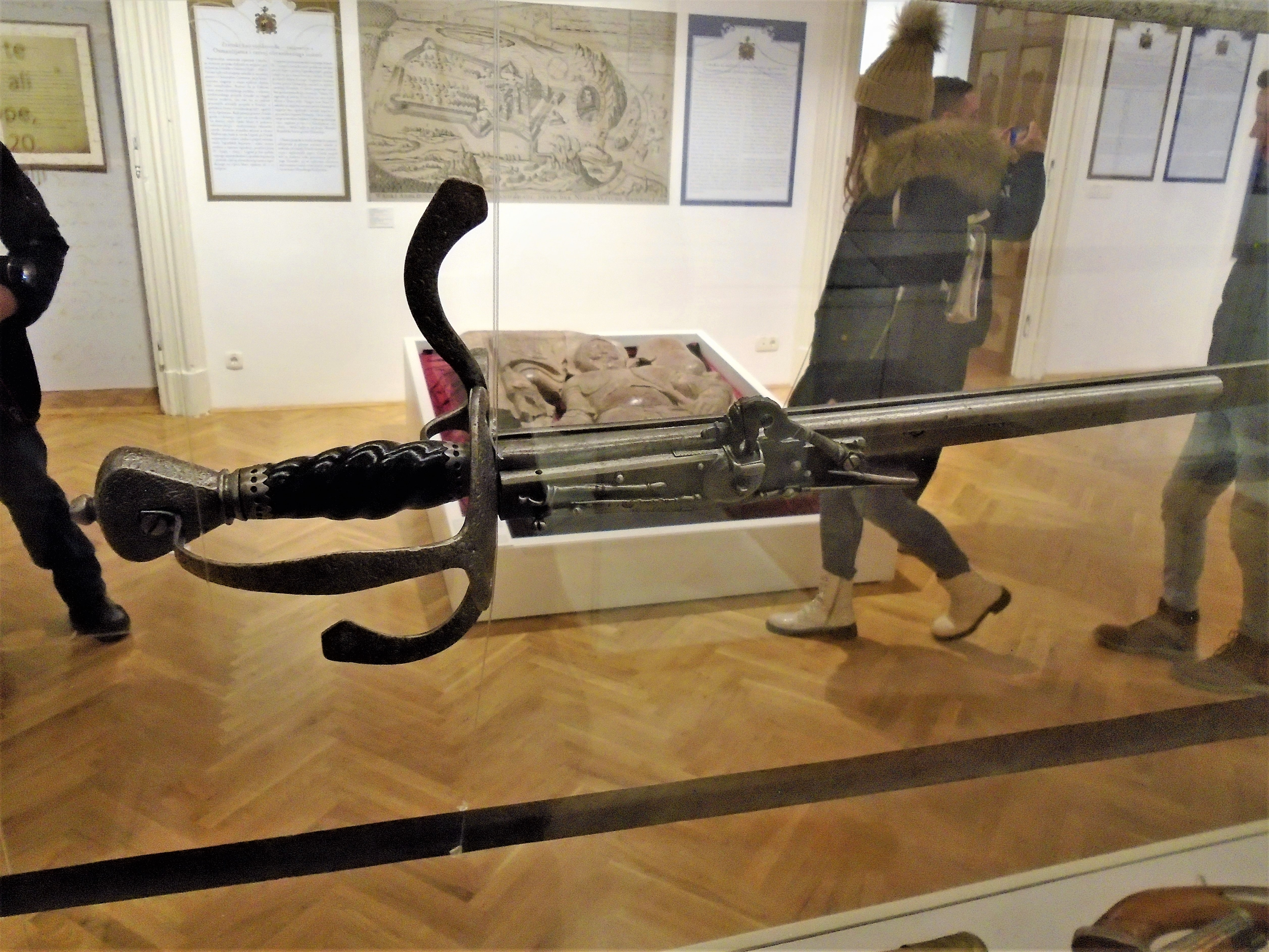
A sword with built-in flint wheellock pistol made in Solingen in 1575

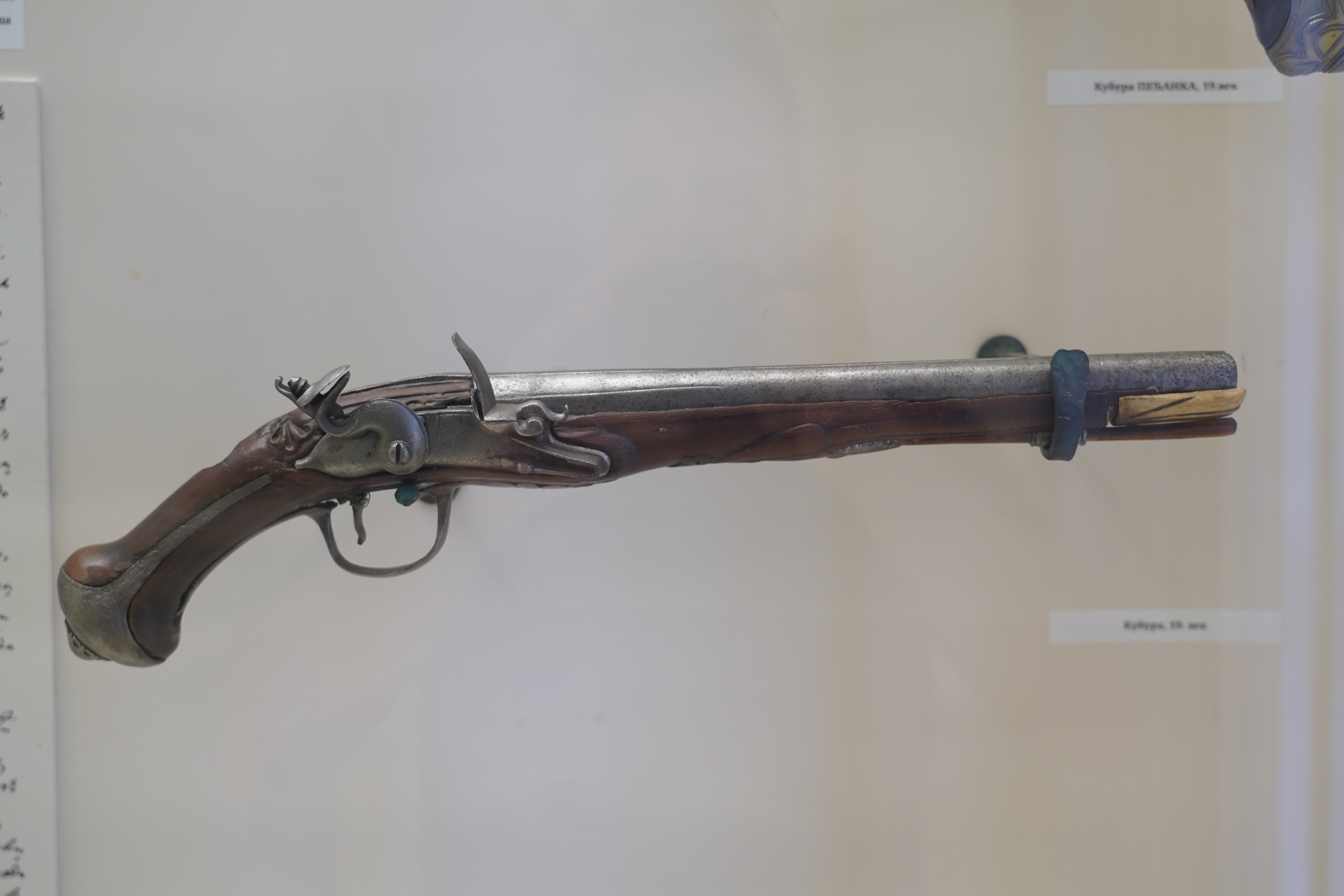

== See also ==
- Blunderbuss
- Boyer rifle
- Caplock
- Dane gun
- Doglock
- Hand cannon
- Matchlock
- Miquelet
- Queen Anne pistol
- Snaphance
- Snaplock
- Wheellock

== General and cited references ==
- Blackmore, Howard L. (1965). Guns and Rifles of the World. New York: Viking Press. OCLC 854692.
- Blair, Claude (1968). Pistols of the World. New York: Viking Press. OCLC 440919.
- Flayderman, Norm (1998). Flayderman's Guide to Antique Firearms and Their Values (7th ed.). Iola, WI: Krause Publications. ISBN 9780873491983. OCLC 39151598.
- Lenk, Torsten (1965). Hayward, J.F. (ed.). The Flintlock: Its Origin and Development. Translated by Urquhart, G. A. New York: Bramwell House. OCLC 1343199.
