= Marin le Bourgeoys =

French artist and inventor

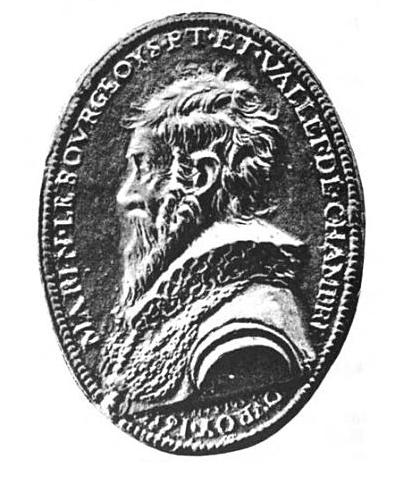
- Portrait-Medal of Marin le Bourgeoys, 1633
- Born: Marin le Bourgeoys; 1550; Lisieux, France
- Died: 1634 (aged 83–84)
- Occupation: inventor/artist
- Known for: inventing the flintlock mechanism

Marin le Bourgeoys (c. 1550–1634) was a French artist and inventor, known for inventing a flintlock mechanism that was used in firearms for over two centuries.

== Life ==
Marin le Bourgeoys was born into a noted artisan family in Lisieux, in Normandy, France. He was probably initially trained as a painter. He later attained fame not only as an artist, but as a gunsmith, inventor, and luthier. In 1598, his talents attracted King Henry IV, and he was appointed Valet de Chambre in the Royal Court. In 1608, he was granted rooms in the Grand Gallery of the Louvre. He produced artwork, firearms, air guns, crossbows, and movable globes. He continued in royal service under the reign of King Louis XIII.

Sometime between 1610 and 1615 it is believed that he created the first "true" flintlock ignited firearm, which was an improvement on earlier flintlock systems. One feature of Marin le Bourgeoys' lock was that it had a half cocked position, from which the weapon could be loaded but would not fire. This feature proved to be much safer than earlier designs, and was widely implemented as other gunsmiths copied the flintlock musket. His basic design was copied and soon spread over all of Europe and was standard in firearm use until the 1840s, when it was finally replaced by percussion lock systems.

His weapons were considered works of art, and Louis XIII kept many of them in a private collection. The King also gave them to favored courtiers and highly esteemed visitors.

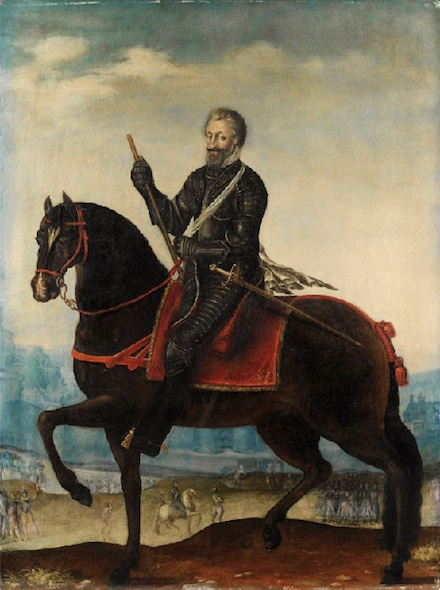
"Equestrian Portrait of Henri IV in armor in Front of a City" by Marin Le Bourgeoys. Musée de l'armée
