= Miquelet lock =

Type of firearm mechanism

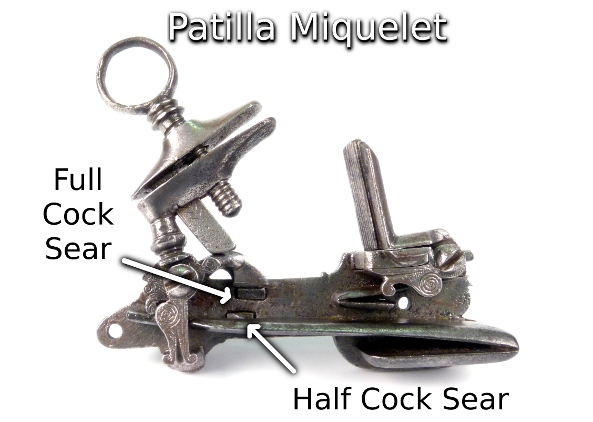
With the classic Spanish patilla style miquelet lock, the mainspring pushes up on the heel of the hammer and both sears engaged the toe of the foot.

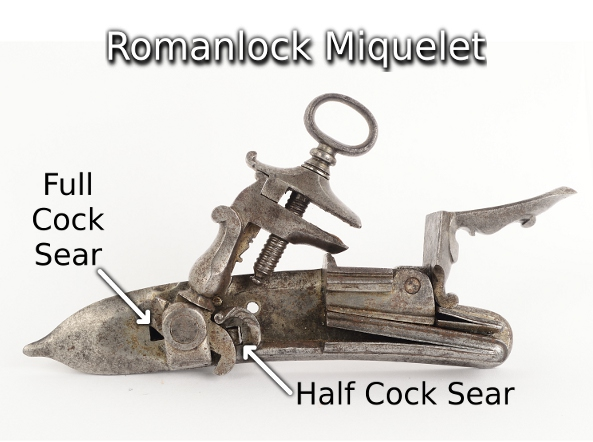
With the Italian or Roman style miquelet lock, the mainspring pushes down on the toe of the hammer and the sears engaged the hammer on both the toe and heel.

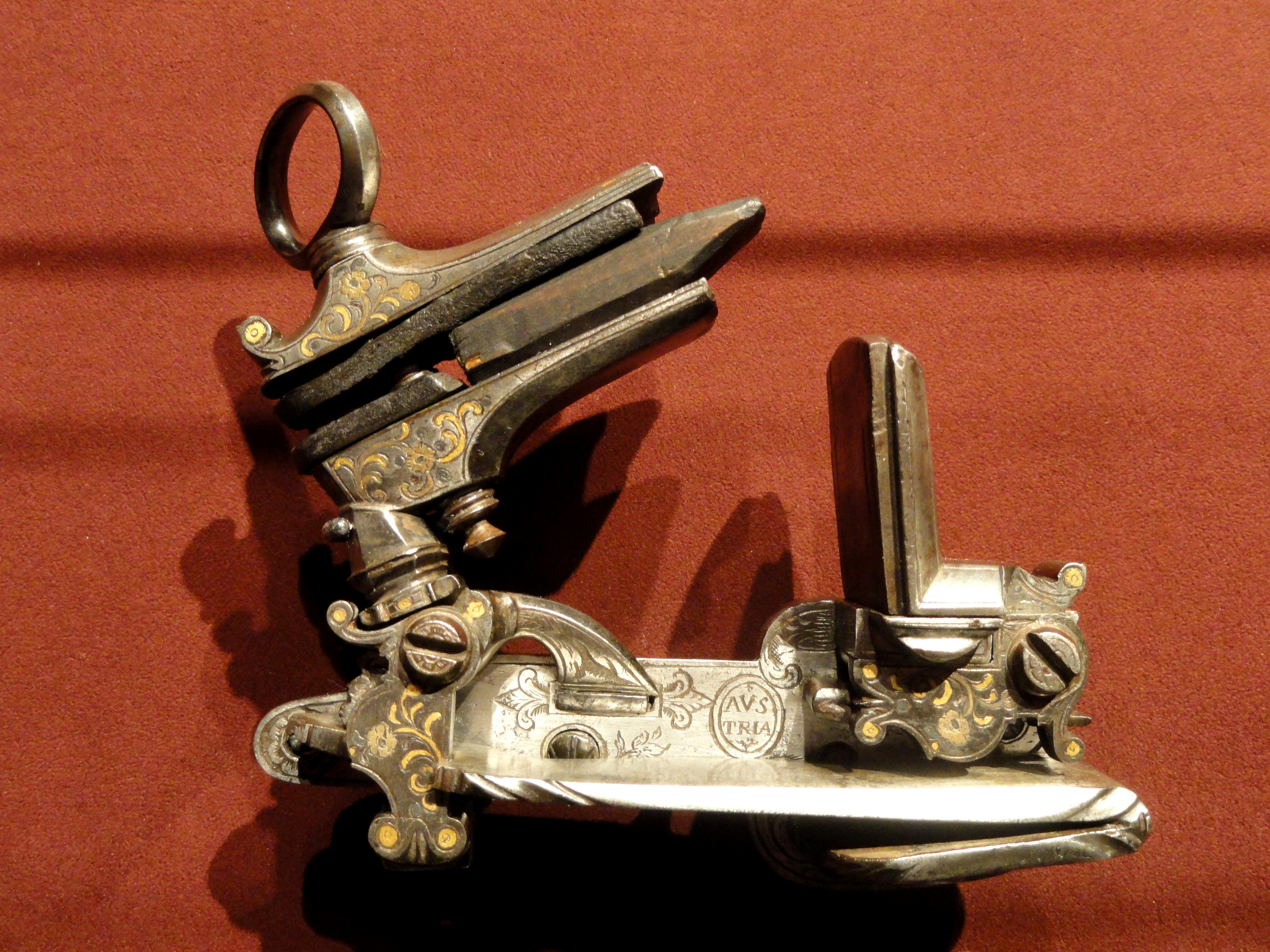
Patilla style miquelet lock inlaid with gold and silver, late 1600s

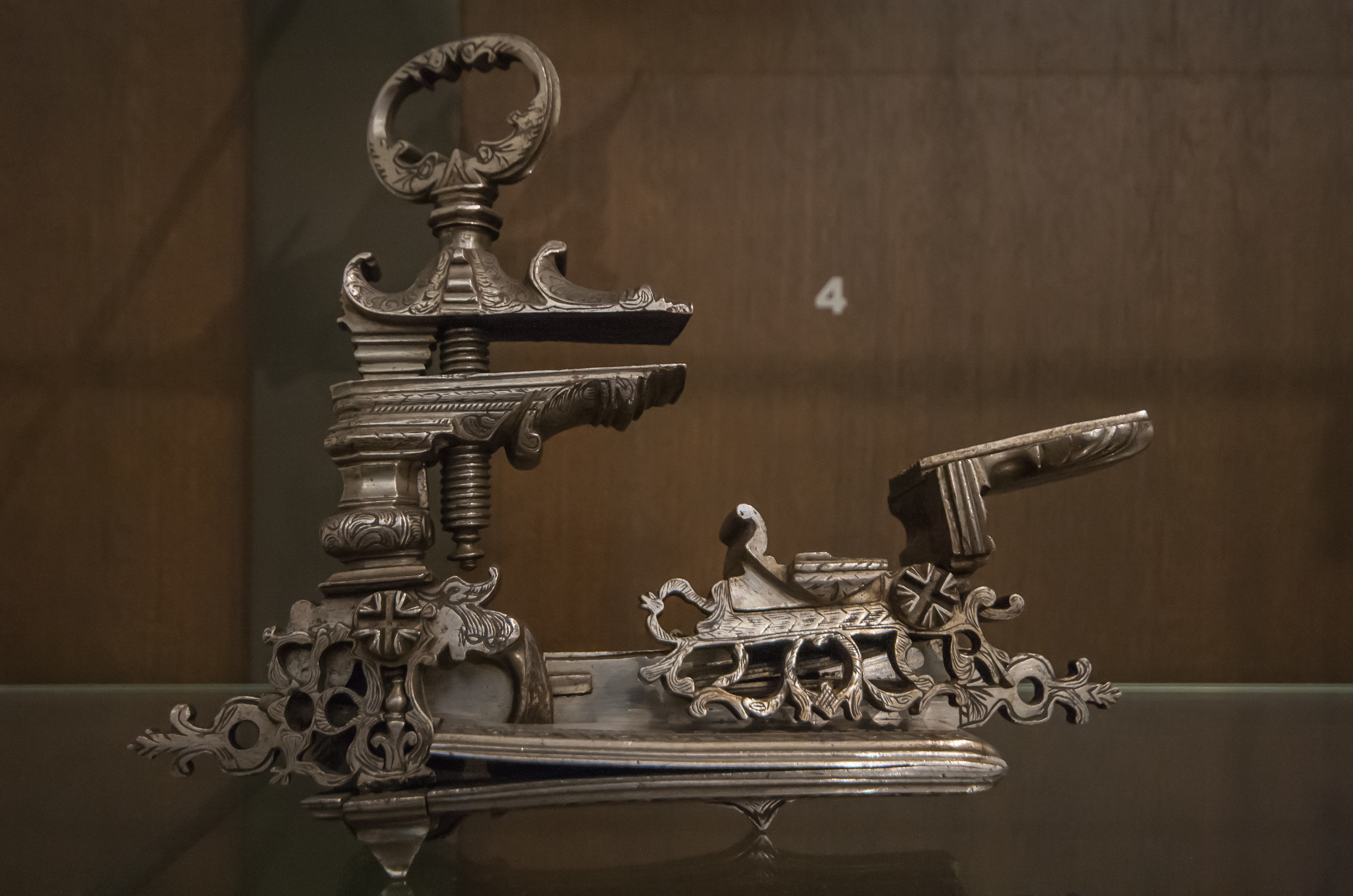
Chiselled and pierced patilla style miquelet lock

Miquelet lock is a modern term used by collectors and curators for a type of firing mechanism used in muskets and pistols. It is a distinctive form of snaplock, originally as a flint-against-steel ignition form, once prevalent in the Spanish, Portuguese, and Ottoman empires, Italy, Greece, Russia, Ukraine, North Africa, and the Balkans from the late 16th to the mid-19th century.

The term miquelet lock was not recorded until the 19th century, long after the appearance of the mechanism in the 16th century, and is of uncertain origin. One commonly held view is that it was coined by British troops in the Peninsular War to describe the style of musket used by the Miquelet militia that had been assigned to the Peninsular Army of the Duke of Wellington. In most of Spain, it was traditionally called the llave de rastrillo ("rake lock"), and in Catalonia and Valencia it was called the pany de pedrenyal ("flint-lock") or simply pedrenyal ("flint").

There is often confusion, or at least a difference of opinion, as to what constitutes a snaplock, snaphaunce, miquelet and a flintlock. The term flintlock was, and still is, often applied to any form of friction (flint) lock other than the wheellock with the various forms sub-categorized as snaphaunce, miquelet, English doglock, Baltic lock, and French or "true" flintlock ("true" being the final, widely used form). Strictly speaking, all are flintlocks. However, current usage demands the separation of all other forms of flintlock from the so-called "true flintlock".

== History ==
In the disastrous Charles V's 1541 campaign of Algiers, weather conditions prevented the firing of arquebuses. Problems were caused on both wheellocks and matchlocks, firstly by wind blowing away the gunpowder when the pan cover was opened during priming, and secondly, by rain wetting matches and gunpowder. The earliest known appearance of the miquelet lock was in Spain within three decades of the Algiers military disaster.

The poet/novelist Ginés Pérez de Hita, in his historical novel Civil Wars of Granada, alludes to his "escopeta de rastrillo" being in common use in Xàtiva and Valencia prior to and during the Alpujarras Rebellion (1567–1571).

In his 1605 work Don Quixote, Miguel de Cervantes says that in Catalonia their name was pedrenyal, to the extent that pedrenyal lock means miquelet lock, the long-barreled wheel lock pistols were not called pedrenyals.

As both de Hita and Cervantes allude to pistols, pedrenales, and escopetas being in use that were not wheellocks, it is reasonable to suggest some form of flint-against-steel gunlock was in use by the late 16th century. Indeed, from about 1580 on, the listings in estate auctions increasingly referred to "arcabuces de rastrillo" and "escopeta de rastrillo". "Rastrillar", to comb or rake, perfectly describes the action of a flint down a battery (frizzen) face. Some listings used the term "llaves de chispa" (meaning spark locks, applied to all manner of flintlocks, miquelets included). Contemporaries did not use the term "miquelet" to describe any type of lock or firearm.

Probably the oldest surviving example of what certainly qualifies as a patilla miquelet lock is item No.I.20 in the Real Armería, Madrid. That unique item is a combination lance and double-barreled gun; its origin unknown, dated almost certainly before 1600.

The archaic form of Spanish lock was further developed by Madrid and provincial gunmakers, almost certainly including the Marquart family of Royal gunmakers, into the Spanish patilla style now most associated with the miquelet.

== Main characteristics ==
The miquelet lock, with its combined battery and pan cover was the final innovative link that made the "true" flintlock mechanism possible. It proved to be both the precursor and companion to the "true" flintlock.

Two main forms of the miquelet were produced: The Spanish lock, where the mainspring pushed up on the heel of the cock foot and the two sears engaged the toe of the cock foot, and the Italian or Roman lock, where the mainspring pushed down on the toe of the cock foot and the sears engaged the cock on the heel of the foot. Neither form was confined exclusively to either country, that is, both Roman locks of Spanish manufacture and Spanish locks of Italian manufacture are not uncommon.

The features most associated with the miquelet are the horizontal sears, acting through the lockplate, coupled with the external mainspring and the top jaw screw ring. Experts agree that the use of horizontally acting sears is the true defining feature because some variations of the miquelet do not have the external mainspring and/or the large top jaw screw ring.

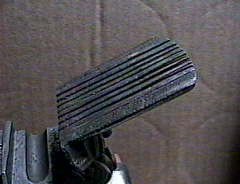
Spanish miquelet grooved battery face

Another seemingly ubiquitous feature of the Spanish miquelets was the striated battery face, or put another way, vertically grooved frizzen. Initially, the striated face was a detachable plate dovetailed and often screwed to the battery. This allowed for the replacement of worn faces without having to rework or replace the complete battery. The detachable grooved face went out of fashion around 1660-1675, replaced by grooving made directly into the battery face, almost certainly due to improved heat treatment and tempering of the battery. The grooving was to a great extent eliminated by French-influenced Madrid gunsmiths around 1700. However, the practice of using both the detachable and integral grooved face was continued by many Spanish provincial gunsmiths as well as by North African and Ottoman lockmakers.

The fully developed lock was known by various names, depending on region or variation of design. In Spain, it was known as the "llave española"; or simply the "patilla". The patilla is the classic Spanish miquelet and the designation of patilla is often used nowadays in lieu of miquelet. The term patilla derives from the fact that the front foot of the cock resembled a rooster foot. In Catalonia, it was "clau de miquelet." In Portugal, it was known as the "fecho de patilha de invenção."

Indigenous variations of the patilla had names such as the "a la de invenciõn", later known as the "alla romana" or "romanlock" or simply, the "Italian." The Spanish miquelet is termed "alla micheletta" by Italian auctioneers. Serious writers and collectors in Europe eschew this term and use more precise, chronologically and geographically pertinent terminology, such as "alla borbona" for the Neapolitan (Naples) variety of external-mainspring lock due to its association with the Bourbons and the Kingdom of the Two Sicilies.

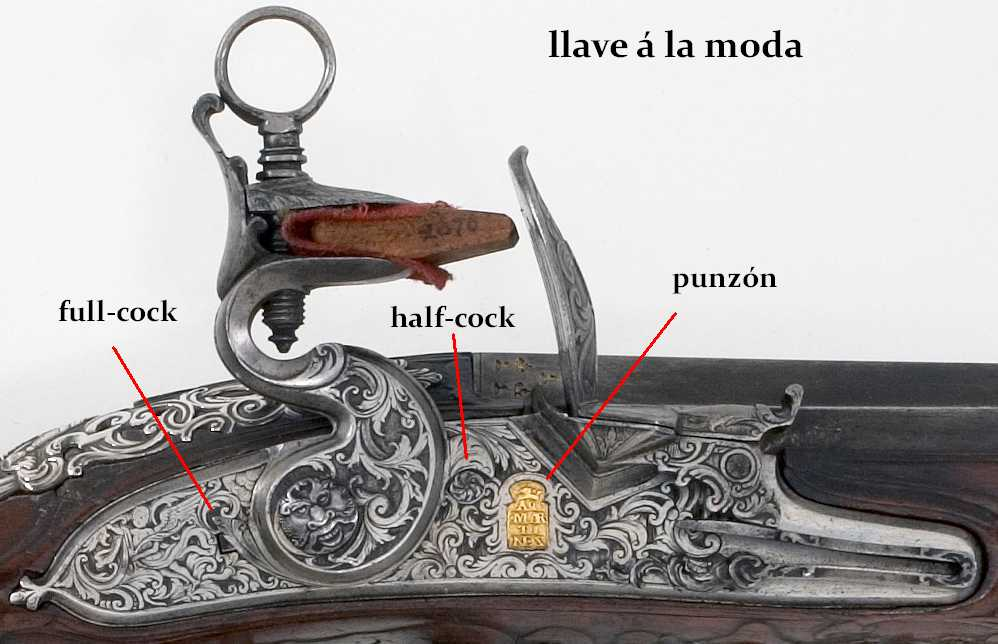
Llave a la moda style miquelet lock by Alonzo Martinez, circa 1730, showing location of the sears and punzón

The French influence on the Spanish lock coincided with the accession of the Bourbon Felipe V in 1701 as king of Spain. This influence produced a type of lock known as the "llave a la moda" or more commonly as the "Madrid" lock as it was produced almost exclusively in and for that city. The Madrid lock is almost indistinguishable from the ordinary French flintlock, with the laterally-operating sears being the only Spanish connection to the classic patilla lock. The half-cock sear (usually round) engaged the top of a small projection often disguised as a rococo embellishment on the breast of the cock. A similar projection on the opposite side of the cock engaged the underside of the full-cock sear, which could be round, flat, or square.

The French flintlock without any miquelet features was termed "llave a la francesa." It was used very little on weapons for private use, but was adopted under Carlos IV for use on military arms such as the Spanish Model 1752/1757 musket, although the French lock was later superseded by a miquelet patilla lock on the Model 1752/91 as the French style lock was deemed too fragile, a frequent complaint from colonial authorities.

Locks using features from Spain, France and Italy, which retained the patilla external mainspring and lateral sear setup, came to be labeled "a las tres modas" (lock of three fashions). Without a doubt, this lock is the final development of the miquelet flintlock before the percussion era. It was produced in Spain and Italy.

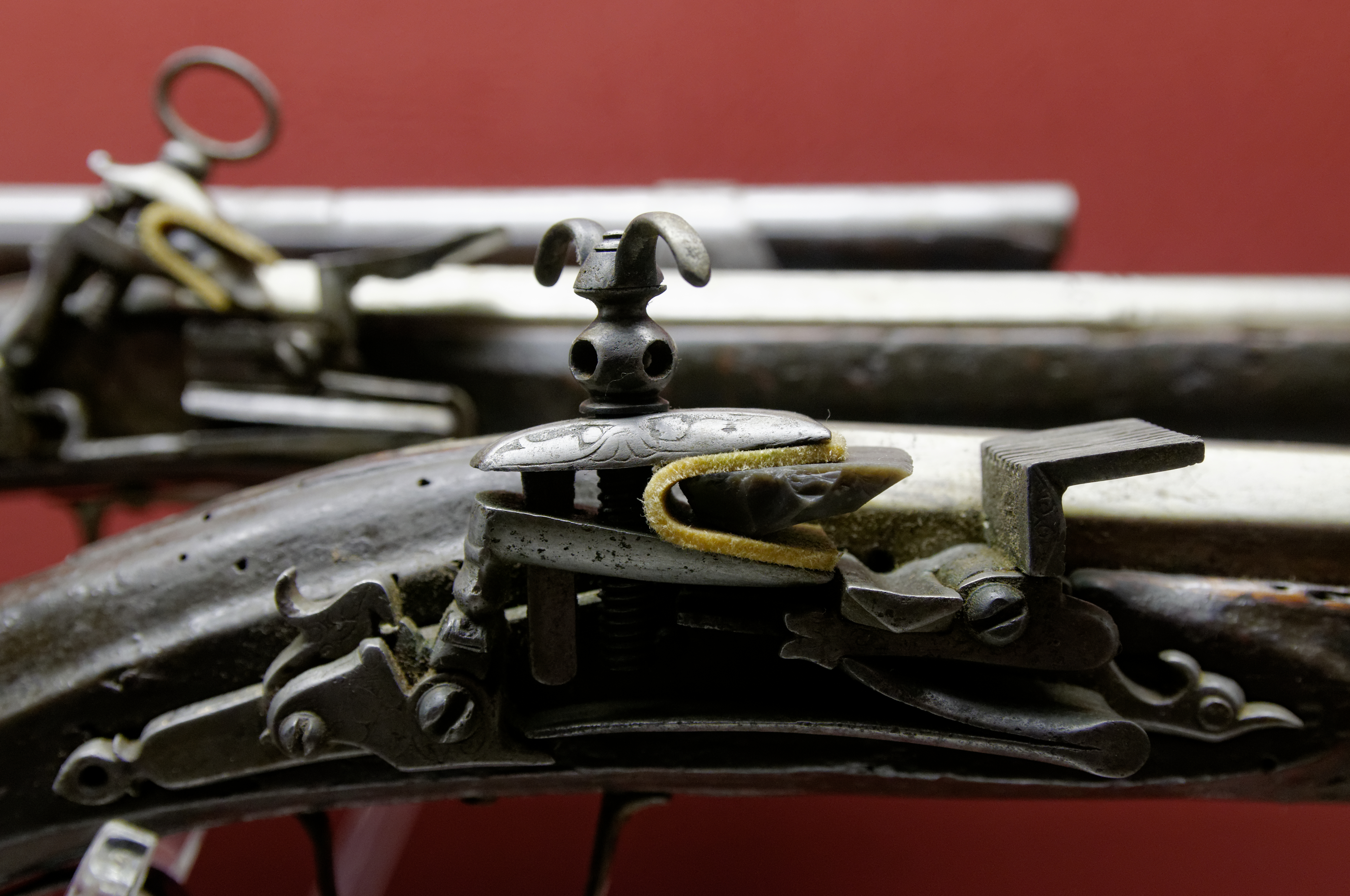
North African moukhala musket showing agujeta lock characteristics

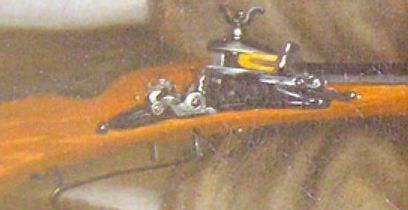
Castilian agujeta on a long gun depicted in a Puga painting circa 1636

The "agujeta" lock or "clau de transició", a contemporary of the patilla, was produced in Ripoll, a gun-making center in Catalonia. The lock was primarily fitted to a long-barreled pistol called a "pedrenyal" and also on long guns for a short period until the patilla became the predominant lock of manufacture in Spain. In Italy, the romanlock seems to have been the mechanical counterpart, and possibly the predecessor of the agujeta. The agujeta used a back catch on the cock in lieu of a half cock sear and the mainspring bore down on the toe of the cock as with the romanlock. A detached combination lock, wheellock and what is certainly an agujeta/romanlock form lock, in the Royal Artillery Museum, Turin, strongly suggests the agujeta/romanlock came to Spain from Italy, probably during a period of Spanish involvement there.

The agujeta lock became firmly established early on in North Africa, most likely being crafted in imitation of Spanish imports. One example would be the Kabyle Musket (moukhala or moukalla), sometimes referred to as the Arab toe-lock.

The miquelet is often termed the "Mediterranean" lock due to its widespread use in areas surrounding the Mediterranean, particularly in the Ottoman sphere of influence. As one author comments: "It was to Arabia and Tartary and from there to Russia that the new Spanish lock found its way."

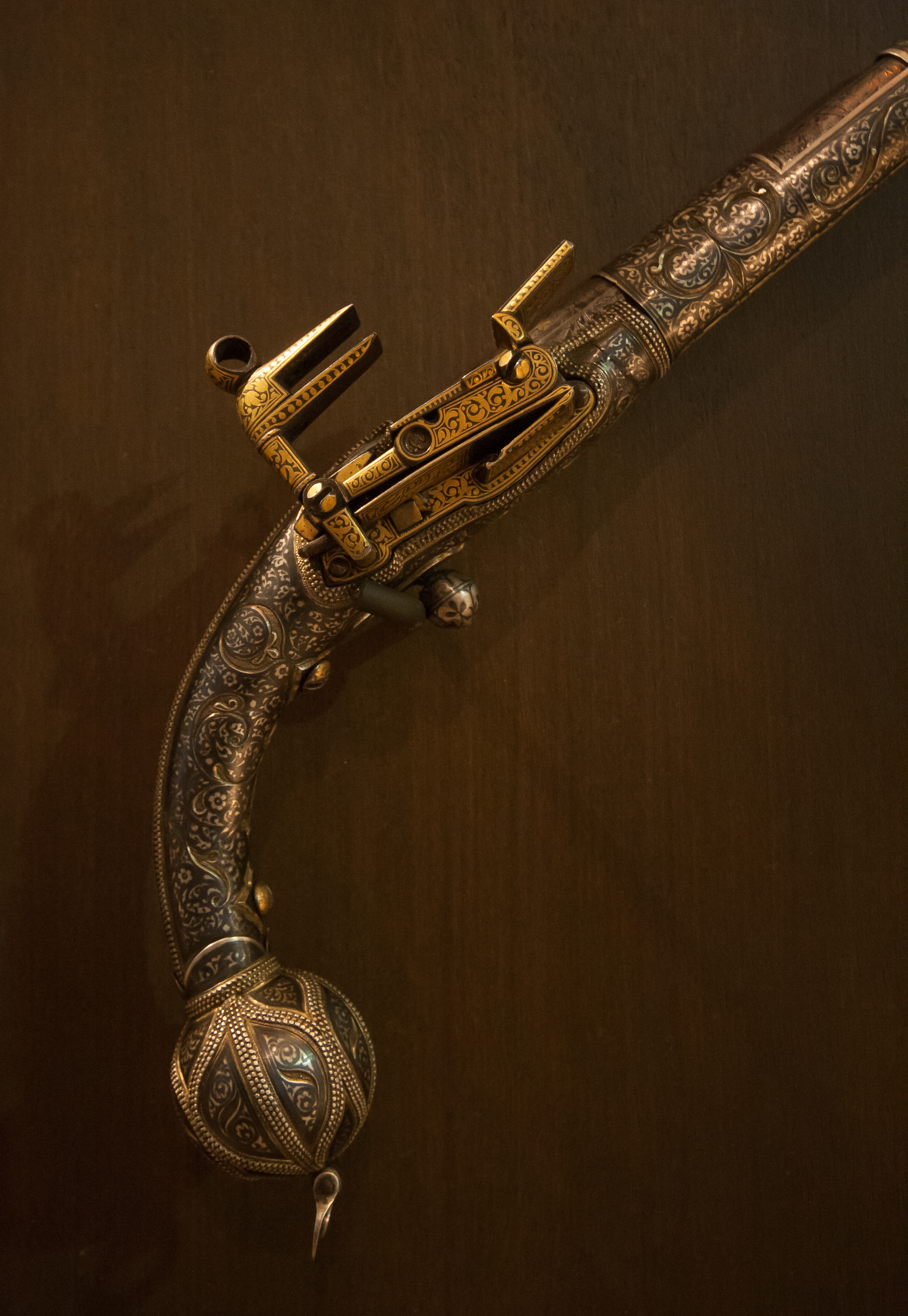
An exquisite Caucasia pistol clearly showing the fastening bridge of the miquelet lock circa 1800

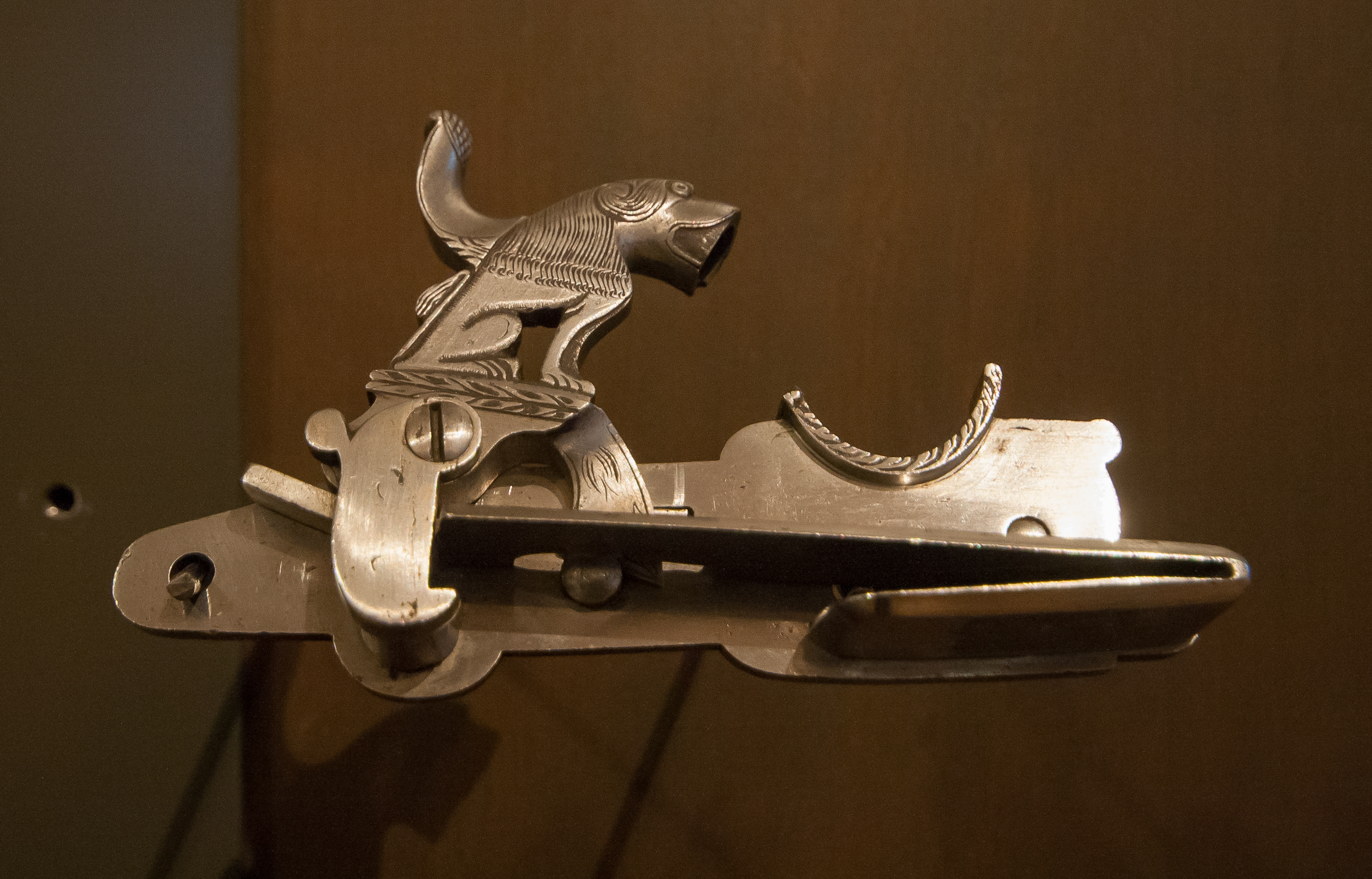
Spanish percussion miquelet lock

The miquelet may have come to the attention of arms makers in Istanbul via long-established trade routes from Italian city-states through the port of Ragusa (Dubrovnik) to provinces on the Balkan Peninsula. Other avenues were probably provided by booty from corsair raids and/or from the many Ottoman-Euro conflicts of the period.

The gunmakers of the Ottoman Empire adopted the conventional Spanish patilla in its basic form, albeit with an additional feature in the form of a fastening bridge between the cock screw and the frizzen screw. This bridge or long bridle had the effect of decreasing torsion on the cock axis. It also provided ample space for decoration to suit local traditions.

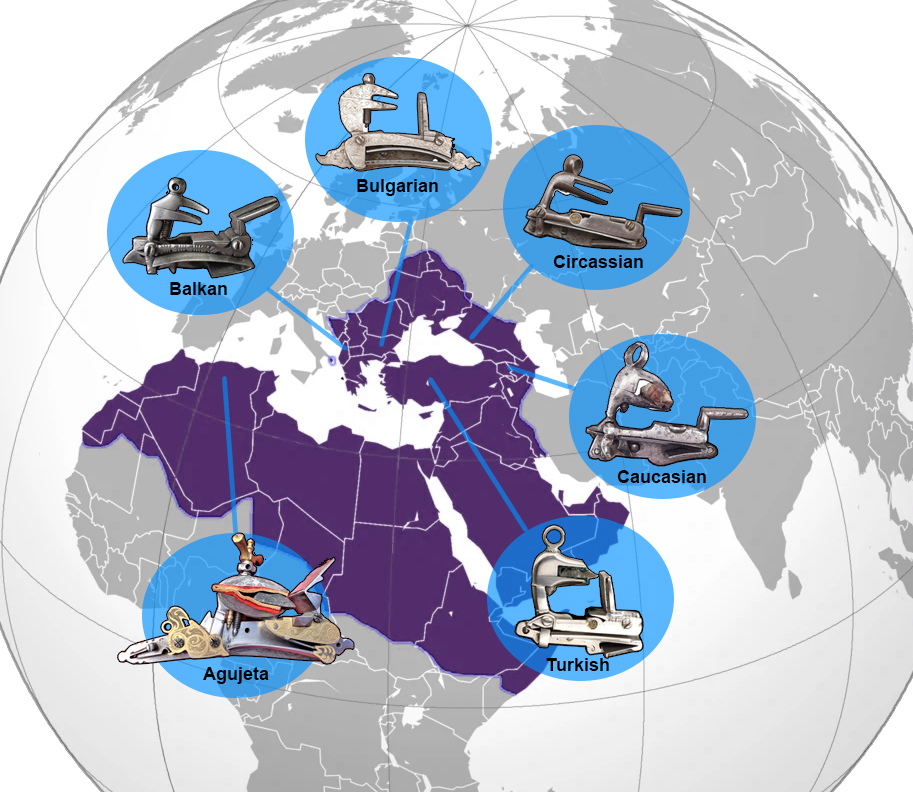
Map of the Ottoman Empire showing the different styled Miquelet locks produced and used in each region

The following video depicts an Ottoman lock being operated

A percussion cap lock mechanism styled on the patilla and romanlock pattern miquelets was used on pistols and sporting guns right up to the advent of the cartridge firearm. Sculpturing of the hammer in the form of wildlife (lions, dogs, mythical beasts, or fish) was a common practice on these percussion miquelet locks. Miquelets fashioned in this way were particularly well represented by the gunmakers of Eibar.

== See also ==
- Caplock mechanism
- Firearm
- Flintlock
- Hand cannon
- Matchlock
- Percussion cap
- Snaphance
- Snaplock
- Wheellock

== General and cited references ==
- Ágoston, Gábor. Guns for the Sultan: Military Power and the Weapons Industry in the Ottoman Empire. UK: Cambridge University Press, 2005
- Blackmore, Howard L. Guns and Rifles of the World. London: Viking Press, 1965
- Blair, Claude, ed. Pollard's History of Firearms. New York: Macmillan, 1983,ISBN 0-600-33154-7
- Brinckerhoff, Sidney B. and Pierce A. Chamberlain. Spanish Military Weapons in Colonial America, 1700-1821. Harrisburg, Pennsylvania: Stockpole Books, 1972
- Chapin, Howard M. and Charles D. Cook. Colonial Firearms Part I in Guns & Other Arms. William Guthman, Editor. New York: 1979.
- Corry, Noel, Major. "The Miquelet Lock" The Gun Digest, 39th Edition. Northfield, Illinois: DBI Books, 1985
- Daskalov, Nikola, and Vyara Kovacheva. Weaponry of the Past. Sofia: Sofia Press, 1989
- Elgood, Robert. Firearms of the Islamic World in the Tareq Rajab Museum, Kuwait. London: I B Tauris, 1995
- Elgood, Robert. The Arms of Greece and Her Balkan Neighbors in the Ottoman Period New York: Thames & Hudson, 2009
- Graells, Eudaldo. "A Primer of Ripoll Gunlocks" in Arms and Armor Annual, Vol. I R. Held, Editor. Northfield, Illinois: DBI Books, 1973
- Held, Robert. The Age of Firearms. Second Revised Edition. Northfield, IL: DBI Books, 1970
- Held, Robert, Editor. Arms and Armor Annual, Vol. I Northfield, Illinois: DBI Books, 1973
- Lavin, James D. A History of Spanish Firearms. London: Herbert Jenkins, 1965
- Lavin, James D. "Spanish Agujeta-Lock Firearms" in Art, Arms, and Armour: An International Anthology, Vol.I: 1979-80. R. Held, ed. Switzerland: Acquafresca Editrice, 1979
- Neal, W. Keith. Spanish Guns and Pistols. London: Bell, 1955
- Spencer, Michael. Early Firearms 1300-1800. Oxford: Shire Publications, 2008
- Winant, Lewis. "Getting the Gunpowder Going-Development of Ignition in Gunlocks" in Guns & Other Arms. William Guthman, ed. New York City: 1979
