= Snaphance =

Type of firearm mechanism

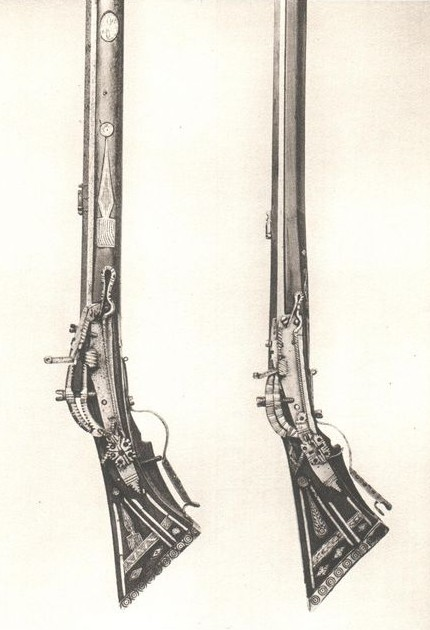
Swedish snaphance guns from the mid 17th century

A snaphance or snaphaunce is a type of firearm lock in which a flint struck against a striker plate above a steel pan ignites the priming powder which fires the gun. It is the mechanical progression of the wheellock firing mechanism, and along with the miquelet lock and doglock are predecessors of the flintlock mechanism.

The name is Dutch in origin but the mechanism cannot be attributed to the Netherlands with certainty.

Examples of this firearm can be found in Europe, North Africa, and the Middle East.

== Design ==
A snaphance lock cocked and ready to fire

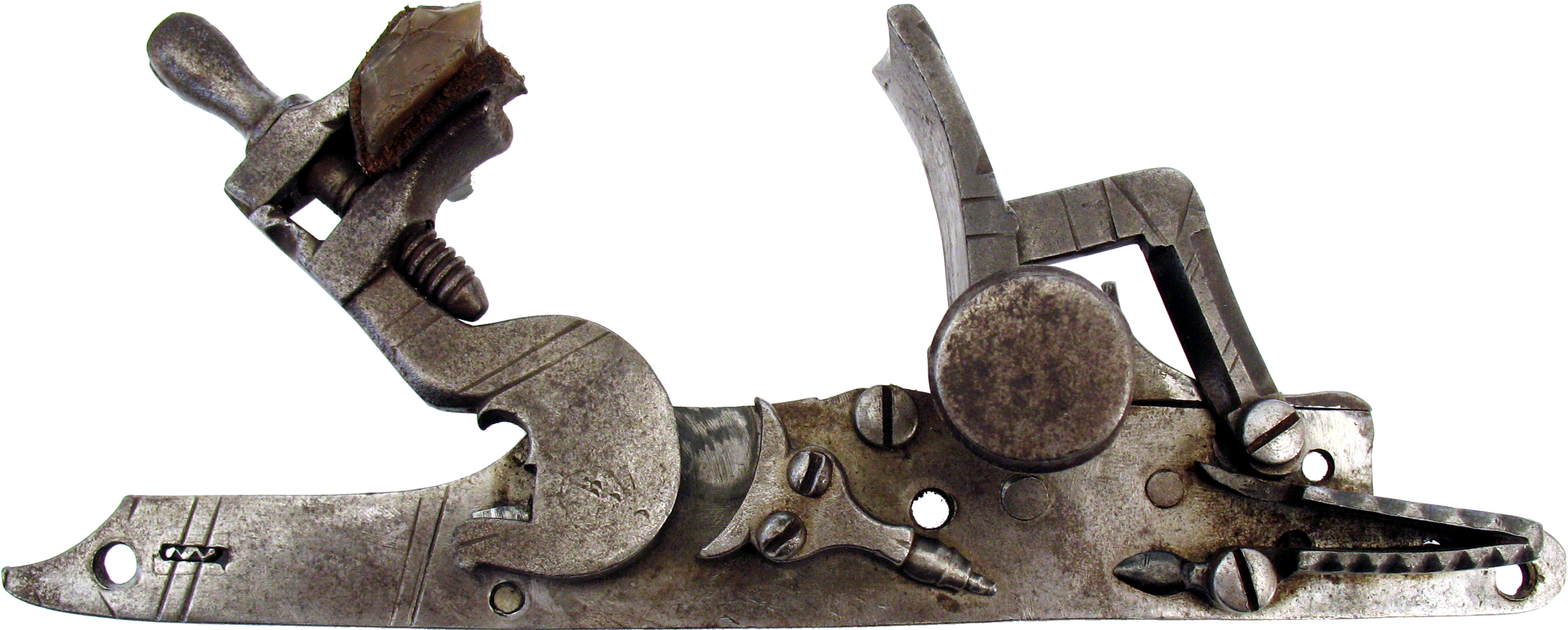
External view, showing the cock and frizzen rotated back

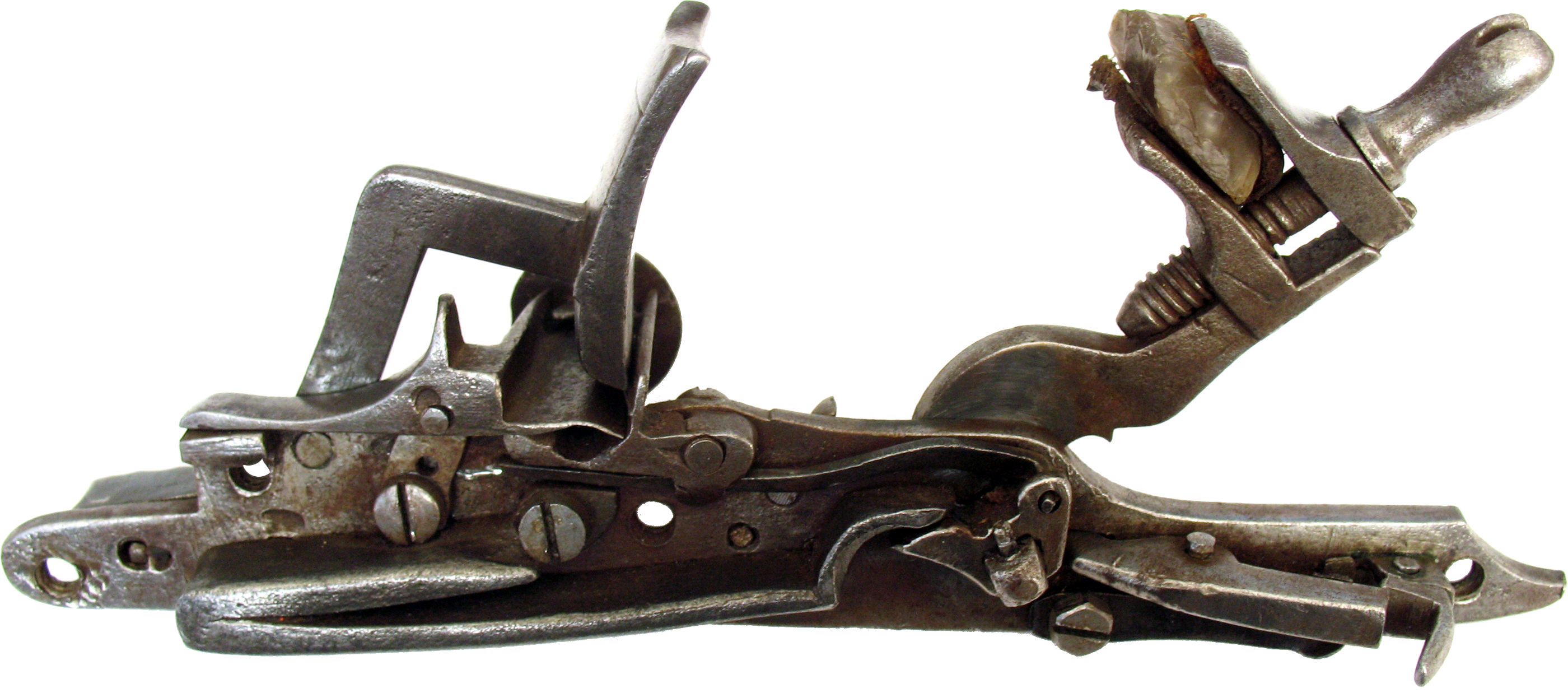
Internal view, showing the flash pan cover closed and the lateral sear engaged

The same lock, fired

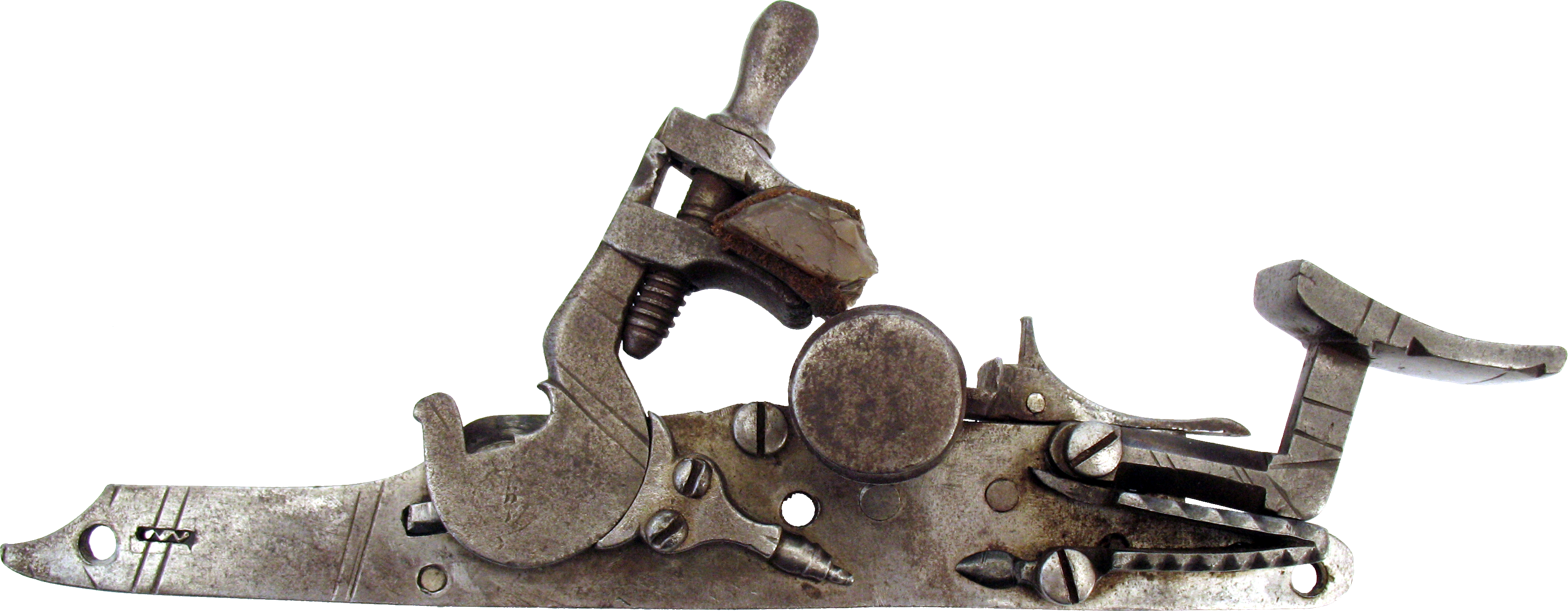
External view, showing the cock and frizzen rotated forward

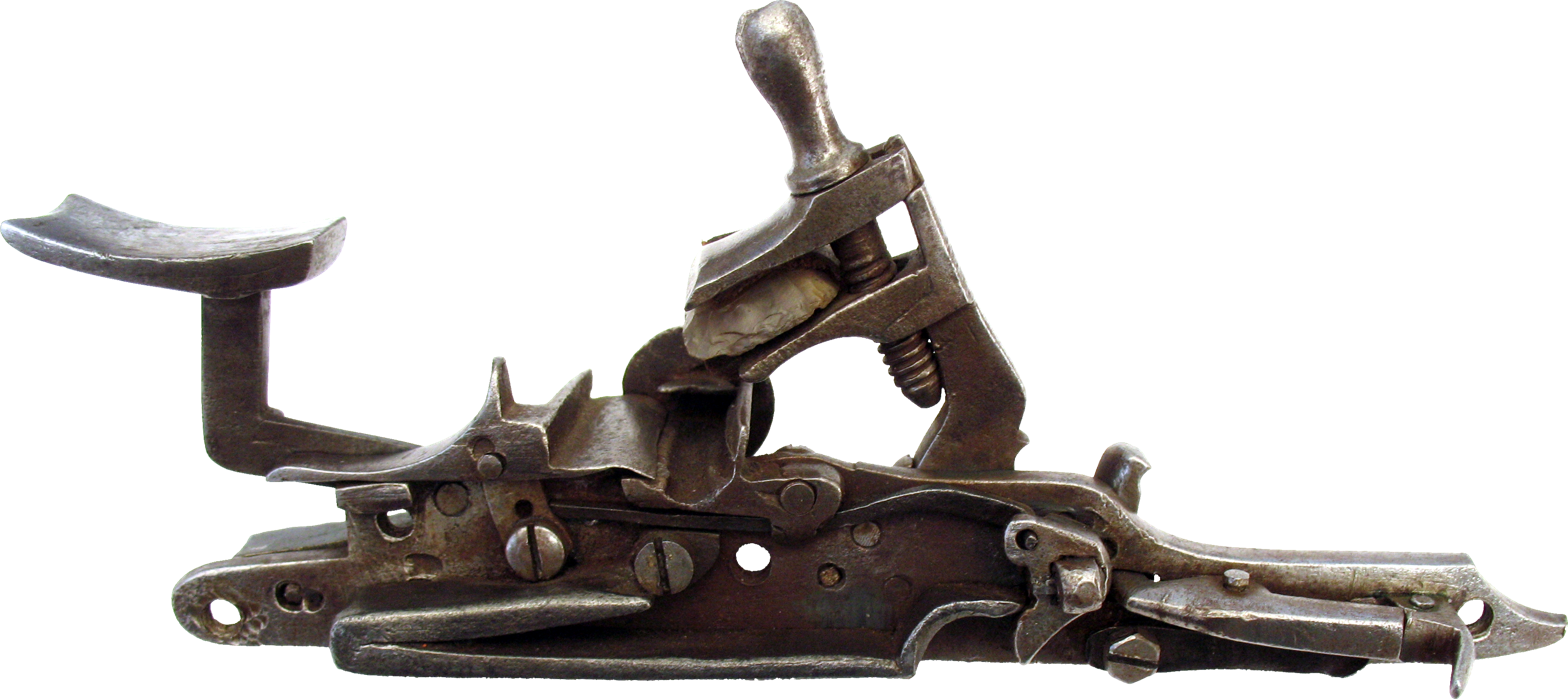
Internal view, showing the flash pan cover pushed forward to open the pan and the lateral sear disengaged

Like the earlier snaplock and later flintlock, the snaphance drives flint onto steel to create a shower of sparks to ignite the priming powder in the pan, the flash partly passing through the touch hole into the barrel where it ignites the main charge (propellant).

The flint is held in a clamp at the end of a bent lever called the cock. Upon pulling the trigger, this moves forward under the pressure of a strong spring and strikes a curved plate of hardened steel (called simply the steel, or in 17th century English dialect the frizzen) to produce a shower of sparks (actually white-hot steel shavings). These fall into a flash pan holding priming powder. The flash from the pan travels through the touch hole to cause the main charge of gunpowder to explode. The steel is at the end of an arm that can be moved independently of the pan cover.

The snaphance first appeared in the late 1550s as an improvement of the earlier snaplock in one or more of the following countries: Spain, Holland, Germany, Scotland, or Sweden. The main improvement was that the pan-cover opened automatically (to keep the priming dry until the exact moment of firing), as in the wheel-lock. (The snaplock had a manually operated pan cover similar to that of the matchlock. Some definitions class the snaphance as a sub-type of snaplock.) Also like the wheel-lock, the snaphance used a lateral sear mechanism to connect the trigger to cock. Later models had a variety of safety mechanisms to prevent accidental discharge of the gun. Without these the weapons, like any firearm, could be highly dangerous: Hakluyt's Voyages records the death of one of the men on Cavendish's circumnavigation in the 1580s due to an accidental discharge during a hurried re-embarkation on the coast of Ecuador, specifically mentioning the weapon was a snaphance. The snaphance has a form of safety built into its design, since the steel (frizzen) could be manually moved forward so that if the cock should be released accidentally it would not strike sparks. This led to an inherent disadvantage: in the flintlock when at half-cock and the frizzen is closed, the flint is in close proximity to the steel and can easily be adjusted to strike square to and in the center of the steel; in the snaphance the cock can only be at full-cock or down, where it prevents the steel from being brought back to the firing position, so the flint is more difficult to align. The development of the snaphance occurred separately but at the same time as the creation of the miquelet.

== Use ==
The snaphance was used from the mid-16th century, most commonly in pistol form as a weapon for officers and cavalry. It was used alongside the inferior wheellock in the 16th and 17th centuries, with different countries favoring different mechanisms. James Turners' Pallas Armata, written in the 1630s, noted that the snaphance (and other flintlocks) reigned supreme among cavalry in France, Britain, and the Dutch Republic, while the wheellock was still more common in the German lands: "The French use locks with half bends (snaphaunces), and so do for the most part the English and Scots; the Germans rore or wheel-locks; the Hollanders make use of both."

Fragility, complexity, and cost kept it from replacing the matchlock in the hands of infantry, though the latter issue became less prominent as technology improved. By 1645 a matchlock musket cost 10 shillings in Britain compared to 15 shillings for a flintlock musket. However, flintlocks were still much cheaper than wheellocks; in 1631 the Royal Armoury's purchase records show the going rate as 3 pounds (60 shillings) for a pair of wheellock pistols versus 2 pounds (40 shillings) for a pair of flintlock pistols.

The Dutch snaphance originated in the Netherlands in 1650. It exemplified early flintlock pistols in that it was clumsy and inelegant and also difficult to carry about the user's person. These weapons were useful for cavalrymen, however, who might carry two, four or even more loaded pistols into action.

By about 1680, it was gradually superseded and was still occasionally issued to reinforcements for Portugal for the British Army in the War of the Spanish Succession of 1703 and in Northern Italy where it was still in use until the 1750s. In Europe, and especially France, the snaphance was replaced by the flintlock with its combined steel/pan cover starting from about 1620. In England, a hybrid mechanism called the English lock replaced the snaphance from the same date. Both the flintlock and the English lock were cheaper and less complex than the snaphance.

The snaphance dominated the New England gun market until it fell out of favor in the middle of the 17th century. Virginia, Massachusetts, and Connecticut outlawed the outdated mechanism by the late 17th century.

== Name ==
The origin of the name snaphance is thought to come from the Dutch Snaphaan, which roughly means "pecking rooster" and relates to the shape of the mechanism and its downward-darting action (and would also explain the name "cock" for the beak-shaped mechanism which holds the flint). In German, the calque Schnapphahn moved away from the earlier definitions and has traditionally referred to a mounted highwayman, who would have been likely to use a firearm of that nature. The French chenapan also changed its meaning in the seventeenth century to define a rogue or scoundrel. During the Second Northern and Scanian Wars, a "Snapphane" was a pro-Danish Guerilla-man in Scania, which had just been annexed by Sweden, as they wanted to belong to Denmark instead.

In Swedish the word Snapphane is first recorded 1558 in a letter from King Gustav I to his son Duke John of Finland "reffvelske snaphaner" (Snapphanar from Tallinn-Reval), earlier correspondence were discussing Estonian privateers and problems created by them in Russian commerce. In the inventories of the Royal Armoury in Stockholm the term snapphanelås (snaphance lock) appears first in 1730, after the conquest of the former Danish provinces of Skåne, Halland and Blekinge in the 1670s. The local peasant warriors were then called snapphanar and their typical smallbore rifles (see picture) were described as having snapphanelås: locks or rifles used by the Snapphanar. In the earlier inventories the term used is always snapplås (snaplock).

== See also ==
- Caplock mechanism
- Flintlock
- Hand cannon
- Matchlock
- Miquelet
- Percussion cap
- Snaplock
- Wheellock
- Doglock
