= Buck and ball =

Ammunition for a muzzle-loading musket

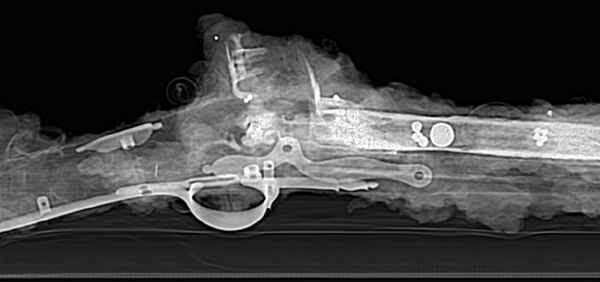
X-ray of a Brown Bess musket recovered by LAMP archaeologists from an American Revolutionary War era shipwreck lost in December 1782. It is believed to be a 1769 Short Land Pattern, and is loaded with buck and ball.

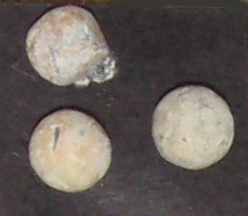
Buckshot pellets from the American Civil War

Buck and ball was a common load for muzzle-loading muskets, and was frequently used in the American Revolutionary War and into the early days of the American Civil War. The load usually consisted of a .50 to .75 caliber spherical lead musket ball that was combined with three to six buckshot pellets.

== Construction ==
By the 1840s, buck and ball was issued in prepared paper cartridges that combined the projectiles with the black powder propellant charge to facilitate rapid loading of the weapon. Like any other paper cartridge, the rear of the cartridge would be torn open to expose the powder, which would be loaded, and the remaining paper, ball, and buckshot would be rammed down on top.

== Purpose ==
The intent of the buck and ball load was to combine the devastating impact of a .50 to .75 caliber ball with the spreading pattern of a shotgun. The combination served to greatly improve the hit probability of the smoothbore musket. In combat, especially at closer ranges, the buckshot would retain significant energy. When used against closely packed troops, the spread of the buckshot would be advantageous.

Claud E. Fuller, in his book The Rifled Musket, shows tests of a rifled musket firing Minié ball, and a smoothbore musket firing round ball and buck rounds at various ranges against a 10 by 10 inches (25 cm × 25 cm) target. The firers consisted of several men in line shooting in volley. At ranges of 200 yards (180 m) and under, the buck and ball from the smoothbore musket, while less accurate than the rifled musket, produces a greater number of hits due to the greater number of projectiles. At 100 yards (91 m), 50 shots by smoothbore buck and ball against the 10 by 10 inches (25 cm × 25 cm) target result in 79 buckshot hits and 37 ball strikes, as opposed to 48 Minié ball hits in 50 shots. At 200 yards (180 m), 37 of 50 Minié bullets struck the target, vs. 18 of 50 smoothbore balls and 31 of 50 buckshot, for a total of 49 hits in 50 shots.

Beyond this range, the buckshot will have lost too much energy to be effective due to its lower ballistic coefficient.

== Use ==
During the American Revolution, a standardized procedure was used for the assembly of buck and ball ammunition for British and French service cartridges. George Washington encouraged his troops to load their muskets with buck and ball loads.

Other European musket like Swedes model, Prussian model, and other are equipped with buckshot or buck n' ball cartridges during Napoleonic War. Buck and ball was common in British service during the Seven Years' War and on the colonial American frontier.

The buck and ball load was standard issue throughout the War of 1812, Seminole Wars of 1815–45, and Mexican-American War of 1846-1848. Examine and showcase the damage from buckshot rounds. An estimated 2,061,446 buck and ball .22 cartridges were produced for the war.

Roughly 1,000 War of 1812 veterans came to eastern Texas, and many of these men, carrying trade muskets and flintlock Charlevilles dating back to the former French colonial period in Louisiana and even Texas, would have been trained in their use and instinctively reached for them in close combat. During the civil war between Federalists and Centralists, both sides used buck and ball, as seen with Mexican forces possibly at the Alamo and Breece's Greys issuing U.S. M1795 or M1812 pattern muskets. Buckshot recovered from the San Jacinto battlefield is linked to the cavalry skirmish on April 20, 1836, which preceded the primary Texian engagement on April 21. Buck n' ball cartridge can retrofitted in .69 caliber Tryon musket, which was utilized by the Republic of Texas.

Richmond Arsenal produce ammo domestically. The Confederacy relied heavily on smoothbore muskets, such as the Springfield Model 1795/1842, during the early years because they lacked enough modern Minié-type rifles and had to issue the older weapons and buckshot stockpile already in Southern arsenals. The state-operated Columbus Arsenal made 594,000 buck n' ball cartridge for the Springfield model and 663,000 cartridge for over 160,000 Model 1809 Potzdam to equip the rapidly growing Union regiments, more than half of which were these converted muskets and a shipment of approximately 52,000 Model 1809 muskets, delivered by the Liège-based arms dealer Lemaire, reached the Confederacy, imported from Prussia within the German Confederation. With the advent of general issue rifled muskets in the American Civil War, and longer engagement ranges during the later stages of the war, the buck and ball loading began to fade from use. Buck and ball did see action in the remaining inventory of smoothbore muskets at Gettysburg and later actions. Confederate cavalry and infantry frequently employed shotguns in engagement. The Union Irish Brigade retained their smoothbore muskets until late so they could fire buck and ball during the relatively close range battles. The 12th New Jersey Infantry Regiment also preferred to use buck and ball, which they did to deadly effect at Gettysburg, and so continued carrying smoothbore muskets. Another used by the Pennsylvanian Infantry Regiment, 90th Volunteer Infantry, near Oak Ridge. The Confederate regiment continue using ammo for the .69 smoothbore model in Knoxville campaign. According to Colonel Gorgas, Chief of Ordnance, Augusta Arsenal made over 4,580,000 buck n' ball cartridge during the mid-to-late stages of the war.

For the modern combat shotgun the buck and ball load has been replaced in current military inventories by standard buckshot loadings.

== Modern resurgence ==
Modern ammunition manufacturers have recently re-introduced Buck and Ball type shotgun loads, and have been manufacturing defensive shotgun ammunition which largely duplicates the properties of the historical loads. As an example Winchester's PDX1 12 gauge load features three 00-buck copper plated pellets over a one-ounce slug. Similar ammunition is produced by Centurion, called "Multi Defense Buckshot."

== See also ==
- Nessler ball
- Muzzleloader
- Grapeshot
