= Doglock =

Type of firearm mechanism

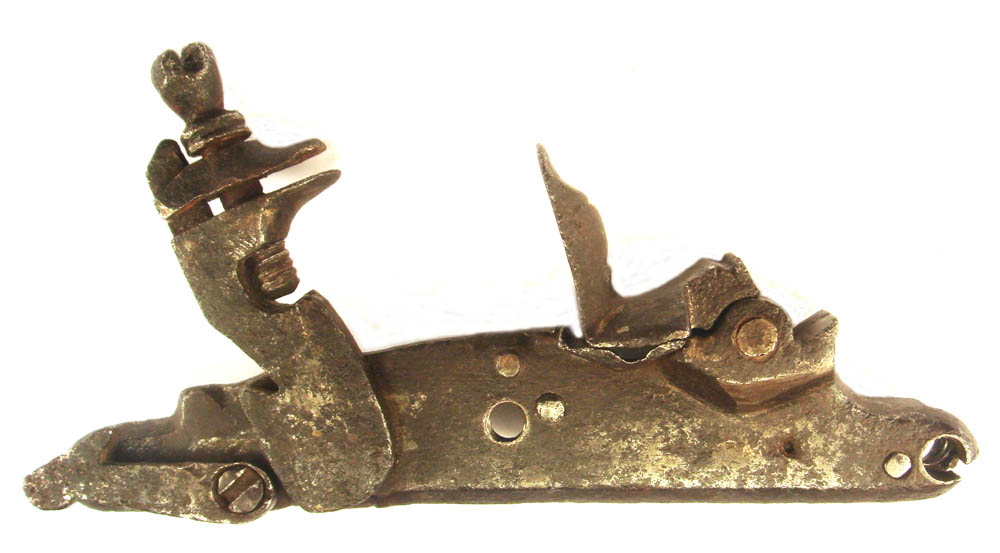
Shown is a small Type 2 English lock of the English Civil War era. The lock is in the full-cock position. The dog has been automatically pushed out of the notch in the back of the cock and is lying back horizontally.

A doglock is a type of lock for firearms that preceded the 'true' flintlock in rifles, muskets, and pistols in the 17th century. Commonly used throughout Europe in the late seventeenth century, it gained popular favor in the British and Dutch military. A doglock carbine was the principal weapon of the harquebusier, the most numerous type of cavalry in the armies of the Thirty Years' War and English Civil War era. Like the snaphance, it was largely supplanted by the flintlock.

Much like the later flintlock devices, it contained the flint, frizzen, and pan, yet had an external catch as a half-cock safety, known as the "dog". This type of lock had no internal, half-cock loading position as the later flintlock mechanism contained. To load a firearm with a dog lock, the cock was secured with the external dog, preventing it from moving forward to strike the frizzen and begin the firing sequence. The user could then safely load the musket or pistol. To fire, the cock was moved to the full-cock position, which caused the dog to fall backward and no longer prevent the lock from firing. A pull of the trigger would then fire the piece. This fell out of favor with the British before 1720. Later flintlocks would contain no such catch, as the half-cock position had been created with the internal parts of the lock.
