= Thomas Alexander Souter =

British army officer (1796–1848)

Thomas Souter
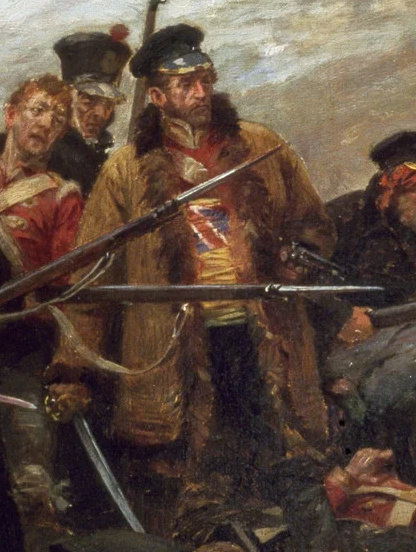
- Souter wearing the colours of the 44th Foot at the Battle of Gandamak
- Born: 11 December 1796
- Died: 10 June 1848 (aged 51)
- Military career
- Allegiance: United Kingdom
- Branch: British Army
- Service years: 1824–1848
- Rank: Captain
- Unit: 44th Regiment of Foot
- Conflicts: First Anglo-Afghan War; 1842 retreat from Kabul; Battle of Gandamak (WIA) (POW)

Captain Thomas Alexander Souter (11 December 1796 – 10 June 1848) was the sole surviving officer of the last stand of the British Army, composed mostly of men from the 44th (East Essex) Regiment of Foot, near Gandamak, Afghanistan, at the close of the first Anglo-Afghan War in 1842. Camp Souter, a former major military base near Kabul, was named after him.

== Life ==
Souter was born in Guildford, Surrey, to a career army officer father, Major Thomas Souter of Derbyshire. The younger Souter was promoted to the 44th Foot Regiment as a lieutenant in 1835 after serving in the 57th Foot. During the 1842 retreat from Kabul, Souter lost two horses and sustained a serious shoulder wound. He and a sergeant had donned the somewhat bedraggled colours of the 44th under their coats to protect them from further deterioration; the sergeant was killed before the remnants of the British army, a force of only 65-80 officers and men with 20 muskets between them, arrived near Gandamak on the morning of 13 January. According to Souter's account in a five-page letter to his wife written in captivity, only he, a mess sergeant, and seven men were spared while the rest were slaughtered after a day's fighting: "In the conflict my posteen flew open and exposed the colour: thinking I was some great man from looking so flash, I was seized by two fellows who. . .took my clothes from me, except my trousers and cap, led me to a village, . . .and I was made over to the head man". After a month, Souter was handed over to Akbar Khan, a son of Dost Mohammad Khan, whom the British had deposed in 1839 but who was later restored to power.

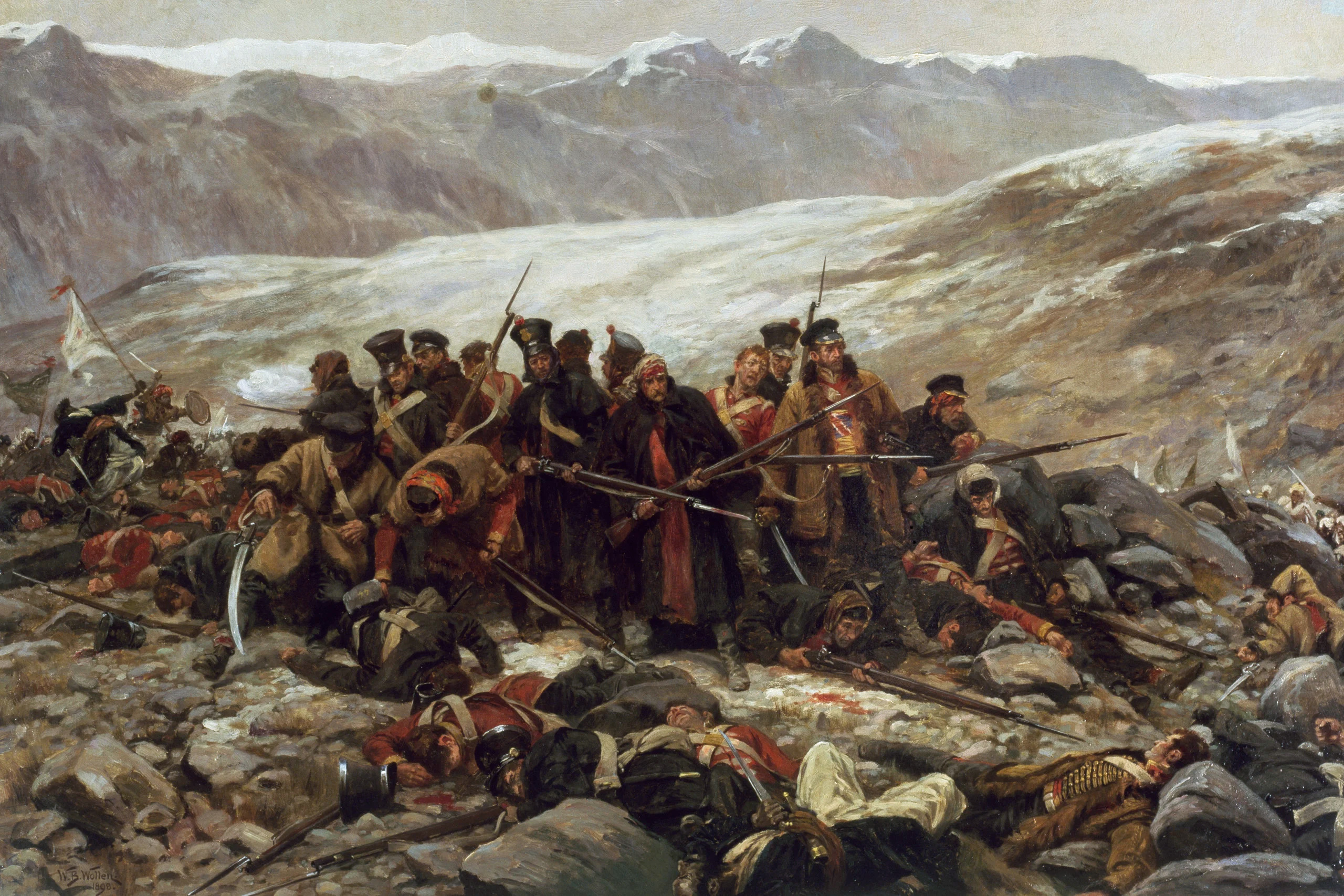
The Last Stand of the 44th Regiment at Gundamuck by William Barnes Wollen, 1898

Souter and the other prisoners were finally released in September 1842. Back in England, Souter served as a captain in the 22nd Regiment. He resigned on 26 May 1848 and died two weeks later. The regiment's colour endured a complicated fate: It was returned to Souter by one of his original captors, though stripped of its tinsel and tassels, then was in the individual possession of various men and officers of the 44th. In recent times, it has been displayed at the National Army Museum, London, England, along with a life-sized mannequin of Souter and the painting depicting the last stand at Gandamak, by William Barnes Wollen (1898), in which Souter is prominently positioned wearing the colour.

== Descendants ==
Thomas and his wife Hannah (née Harpur) had eight children who survived to adulthood. One son, Frank Souter, was the first police commissioner of Bombay. Their daughter Emma married Colonel Edward Penfold Arthur, the son of Sir George Arthur, 1st Baronet, and had a daughter, Isabella Fanny, who married William James Wemyss Muir, the oldest son of Sir William Muir and Elizabeth Huntly Wemyss.
