= Battle of Gandamak =

1842 battle of the First Anglo-Afghan War

- Part of the First Anglo-Afghan War, 1839–1842
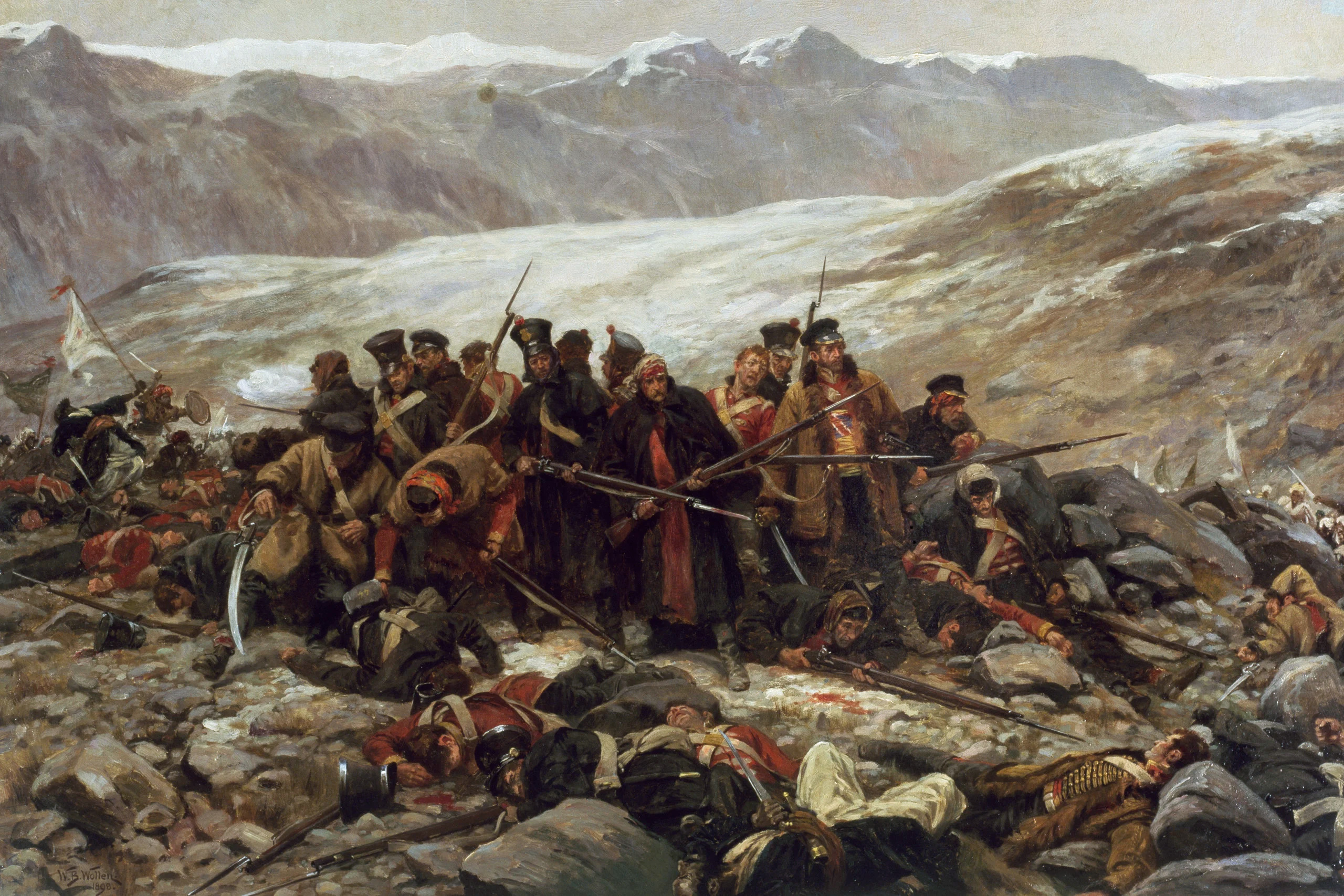
- The Last Stand of the 44th Regiment at Gundamuck by William Barnes Wollen, 1898
Date	13 January 1842
Location	Kabul–Jalalabad Road, near Gandamak, Afghanistan
Result	Afghan victory

Belligerents
Emirate of Kabul	United Kingdom British Empire: British East India Company

Commanders and leaders
Mohammad Akbar Khan	Charles Griffiths (POW)

Strength
Unknown	65 regular troops (20 officers and 45 European soldiers)

Casualties and losses
Light	Entire army

The Battle of Gandamak was the defeat of the last remnant of a British-Indian force in the 1842 retreat from Kabul during the First Anglo-Afghan War. On 13 January 1842, the few remaining survivors of General William George Keith Elphinstone's 4500 soldiers who had begun the retreat were overwhelmed by a horde of Afghan tribesmen. Nearly all were killed, but a few soldiers and accompanying women and children were taken prisoner.

== Background ==
As part of the "Great Game"—the rivalry in the region between Russia and Britain—the British invaded Afghanistan to place former king Shuja Shah Durrani on the Afghan throne, capturing Kabul in August 1839. However, an uprising in Kabul forced General Elphinstone into attempting to retreat with his 4500 soldiers and camp followers to the British garrison at Jalalabad, around 90 miles (140 km) away, beginning on 6 January 1842.

Elphinstone commanded a column consisting of the 1st Battalion of the 44th (East Essex) Regiment of Foot, the 5th, 37th and 54th Regiments of Bengal Native Infantry, one regiment of Shah Shuja's Levy, Anderson's Irregular Horse, the 5th Bengal Light Cavalry and a detachment of the Bengal Horse Artillery with six guns and attached sappers. In total, there were 700 British and 3,800 Indian troops. The camp followers, Indian and British families, their servants and civilian workers, numbered approximately 14,000.

== Battle ==
Constant sniping and attacks had reduced the force to 20 officers and 45 British soldiers of the 44th East Essex Regiment by the time of the battle. Lady Florentia Sale, who was there, kept a journal, recording that there were 20 officers, led by a Major Griffiths, "fifty men of the 44th, six of the horse artillery and four or five Sipahees," armed with only 20 muskets and accompanied by 300 camp followers. (A few others had become separated from the column prior to the last stand and managed to reach safety, among them assistant surgeon William Brydon, who is sometimes described inaccurately as the sole survivor.)

The group was eventually surrounded on a snowy hillock near the village of Gandamak. Despite having only 20 working muskets and two shots per weapon, the troops refused to surrender. A British sergeant is said to have cried "Not bloody likely!" when the Afghans tried to persuade the soldiers they would spare their lives.

Sniping then began, followed by a series of rushes; soon the hillock was overrun by tribesmen. Captain Thomas Alexander Souter was mistaken by the Afghans for a high-ranking officer because they thought he was wearing a general's yellow waistcoat. In fact, Souter had wrapped the regimental colours of the 44th Foot around his body. He was dragged into captivity along with a sergeant named Fair and seven privates. The remaining troops were killed. Traces of weapons and equipment from the battle could be seen in the 1970s and as late as 2010, the bones of the dead still covered the hillside.

In all, throughout the retreat, about 115 British officers, soldiers, wives and children were captured or taken as hostages. The hostages imprisoned in Kabul were rescued by forces led by General Sir George Pollock on 15 September 1842.
