= Graveyard of empires =

Sobriquet often associated with Afghanistan

The graveyard of empires is a sobriquet often associated with Afghanistan. It originates from several historical examples of foreign powers who were unable to achieve military victory in Afghanistan in the modern period, including the British Empire, the Soviet Union, and the United States.

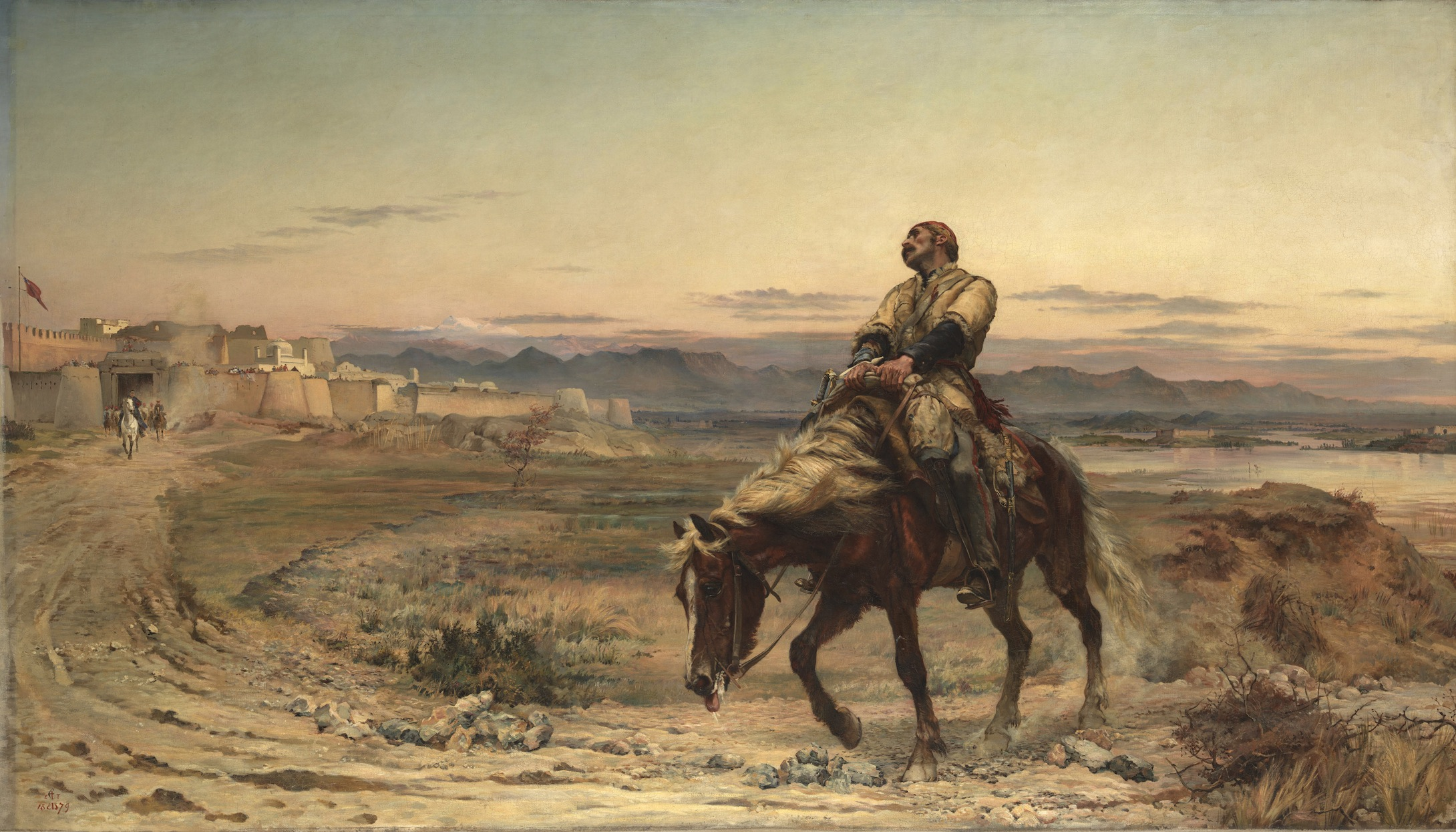
Remnants of an Army, depicting the British retreat from Kabul, presents imagery commonly associated with the sobriquet.

== Historical background ==
Historically, great powers have invaded Afghanistan without having been able to maintain stable long-term rule. Modern examples include the British Empire during the First, Second, and Third Anglo-Afghan wars (1839–1842, 1878–1880, 1919); the Soviet Union in the Soviet–Afghan War (1979–1989); and the United States in the War in Afghanistan (2001–2021). The difficulty of conquering Afghanistan has been attributed to the problems that invaders face when confronting its hazardous mountainous terrain, desert conditions, severe winters, guerilla warfare, qalats (fortresses), enduring clan loyalties, empires often being in conflict with each other while simultaneously attempting to subdue Afghanistan, and complications caused by interactions with Afghanistan's neighboring countries—such as coordinating relations with Pakistan, where fighters in Afghanistan have sometimes located their sanctuaries.

== Usage ==
The phrase, in reference to Afghanistan, does not seem to predate a 2001 article by Milton Bearden in the magazine Foreign Affairs. Alternatively, the term has been applied to Mesopotamia. Elsewhere, a very similar phrase, "the graveyard of nations and empires", has been used in a figurative sense to describe the Old Testament's Book of Isaiah.

The anthropologist Thomas Barfield has noted that the narrative of Afghanistan as an unconquerable nation has been used by Afghanistan itself to deter invaders. In October 2001, during the United States invasion of Afghanistan, the Taliban founder and leader Mohammed Omar Mujahid threatened the United States with the same fate as the British Empire and the Soviet Union.

U.S. president Joe Biden referred to the sobriquet while he delivered a public statement after the 2021 fall of Kabul as evidence that no further commitment of American military presence would consolidate the Islamic Republic of Afghanistan against the Taliban.

== Criticism ==
The New York Times foreign correspondent Rod Nordland has stated that "in truth, no great empires perished solely because of Afghanistan." Joint Services Command and Staff College lecturer Patrick Porter called the attribution "a false extrapolation from something that is true—that there is tactical and strategic difficulty."

The British Empire was not destroyed after the Third Anglo-Afghan War, and the collapse of the British Empire is more commonly attributed to World War II.

While the Soviet–Afghan War was a major factor in the dissolution of the Soviet Union, the opposition in Afghanistan was assisted with foreign aid, primarily from the United States. Furthermore, there is reason to believe that the Soviet Union would have collapsed regardless of the campaign. Nonetheless, the narrative allowed for argument from analogy and the thesis of "history repeating itself", which proved accepted amongst historians, authors and political experts.

== See also ==
- Russian winter

== Bibliography ==
- Barfield, Thomas (2012). Afghanistan: A Cultural and Political History. Princeton University Press. ISBN 978-0-691-15441-1.
- Kühn, Florian P. (2016). "Afghanistan and the 'Graveyard of Empires': Blumenberg, Under-complex Analogy and Basic Myths in International Politics". Myth and Narrative in International Politics. London: Palgrave Macmillan UK. pp. 147–172. doi:10.1057/978-1-137-53752-2_8. ISBN 978-1-137-53751-5.
