= Sir George Pollock, 1st Baronet =

British Indian Army officer (1786–1872)

Field Marshal Sir George Pollock Bt GCB GCSI
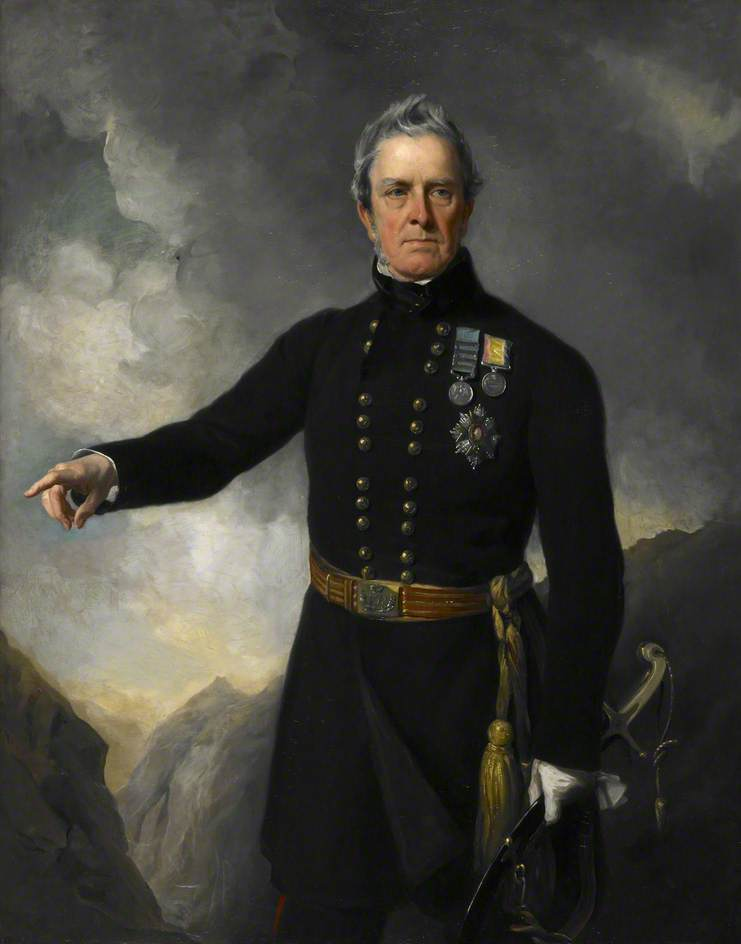
- Portrait by Francis Grant, 1856
- Born: 4 June 1786; Piccadilly, London, England
- Died: 6 October 1872 (aged 86); Walmer, Kent, England
- Relatives: Sir Frederick Pollock, 1st Baronet (brother)
- Military career
- Allegiance: United Kingdom
- Branch: British Indian Army
- Service years: 1801–1846
- Rank: Field Marshal
- Conflicts: Second Anglo-Maratha War; Anglo-Nepalese War; First Anglo-Burmese War; First Anglo-Afghan War
- Awards: Knight Grand Cross of the Order of the Bath; Knight Grand Commander of the Order of the Star of India
- Other work: Constable of the Tower

Field Marshal Sir George Pollock, 1st Baronet, GCB, GCSI (4 June 1786 – 6 October 1872) was a British Indian Army officer. He first saw action at the Battle of Deeg and at the Siege of Bhurtpore during the Second Anglo-Maratha War before taking part in the Anglo-Nepalese War. He also commanded the British artillery at the Battle of Prome and at Bagan during the First Anglo-Burmese War. Following a disastrous retreat from Kabul in January 1842 during the First Anglo-Afghan War, the retreating forces became stranded at the small British garrison at Jalalabad and Pollock was appointed Commander of the Force sent to relieve the garrison: he advanced through the Khyber Pass and relieved the garrison in April 1842. He then set about an unauthorised but ultimately successful mission to rescue the British hostages who had been left behind in Kabul prior to the retreat. In 1844 the Pollock Medal was created to commemorate Pollock's achievements: this medal was to be awarded to the "best cadet of the season" at the Addiscombe Military Seminary.

== Life ==
=== Early life and education ===
Pollock was son of David Pollock, of Charing Cross, saddler to King George III, and Sarah Pollock (née Parsons); his elder brother was the lawyer and politician Sir Frederick Pollock, 1st Baronet. The Pollock family were a branch of that family of Balgray, Dumfriesshire; David Pollock's father was a burgess of Berwick-upon-Tweed, and his grandfather a yeoman of Durham. His business as a saddler was given the official custom of the royal family. Sir John Pollock, 4th Baronet, great-great-grandson of David Pollock, stated in Time's Chariot (1950) that David was, 'perhaps without knowing it', Pollock of Balgray, the senior line of the family (Pollock of Pollock or Pollock of that ilk) having died out.

=== Military career ===
==== Nepal and India ====
Educated at the Royal Military Academy, Woolwich, Pollock was commissioned as a lieutenant-fireworker in the Bengal Artillery on 14 December 1803. Promoted to lieutenant on 19 April 1804, he saw action at the Battle of Deeg in November 1804 and at the Siege of Bhurtpore in Spring 1805 during the Second Anglo-Maratha War. Promoted to captain lieutenant on 17 September 1805 and to captain on 12 March 1812, he served in the Anglo-Nepalese War before being promoted to major on 12 August 1819. He became assistant adjutant-general of artillery in 1820 and being promoted to lieutenant colonel on 1 May 1824.

After taking sick-leave in England, Pollock commanded the British artillery at the Battle of Prome in November 1824 and at Bagan in February 1826 during the First Anglo-Burmese War. He was appointed a Companion of the Order of the Bath on 2 January 1827. He was promoted further to brevet colonel on 1 December 1829 and then posted to Cawnpor to command an artillery battalion in 1830. He became colonel-commandant, Bengal artillery on 3 March 1835 and briefly held a divisional command at Danapur with the rank of brigadier-general before transferring to the more senior command at the Agra district with the rank of major-general on 28 June 1838.

==== Afghanistan ====
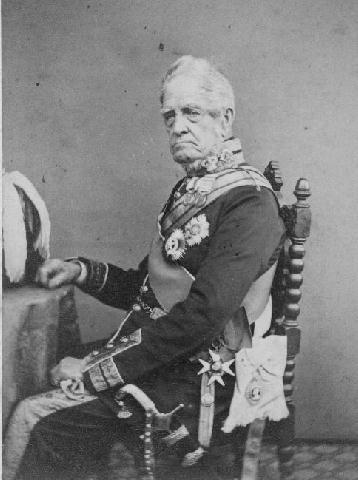
Sir George Pollock in his Field Marshal's uniform

In 1838, Lord Auckland, the Governor-General of India decided to invade Afghanistan to proclaim a pro-British former ruler as king of Afghanistan so instigating the First Anglo-Afghan War. The initial campaign was a success but at the end of 1841, faced with ever-increasing hostility from the Afghans, the military and political leaders decided to withdraw the 5,000 British and Indian troops and 12,000 camp followers, wives and children from Kabul and to return to India. The retreat, which took place in January 1842, was a disaster and eventually led to a massacre because of inefficient leadership, the cold and the ferocious tribes. There was now almost nothing between the retreating forces and India except for the small British garrison at Jalalabad. Legend has it that only one (Dr. Brydon) survived; In fact, he was not the only European to survive the retreat; about 115 British officers, soldiers, wives and children were captured or taken as hostages and survived to be subsequently released. Against this background Pollock was appointed Commander of the Force sent to relieve Jalalabad: he advanced through the Khyber Pass and relieved the garrison at Jalalabad in April 1842.

Pollock then set about an unauthorised mission to rescue the British hostages who had been left behind in Kabul prior to the retreat. He linked up with a British force commanded by General William Nott who was advancing on Kabul from Kandahar. After fighting battles at Gandamak, Jagdalak Pass and Tezeen, Pollock secured Kabul in September 1842. He destroyed the Great Bazaar in Kabul before withdrawing to India in October 1842. Advanced to Knight Grand Cross of the Order of the Bath on 2 December 1842, he became British Resident at Lucknow in December 1843 and military member of the Council of India in September 1844.

In 1844 the British residents in Calcutta created the Pollock Medal to commemorate Pollock's achievements. This medal was to be awarded to the "best cadet of the season" at the Addiscombe Military Seminary.

=== Later life ===
==== Death ====
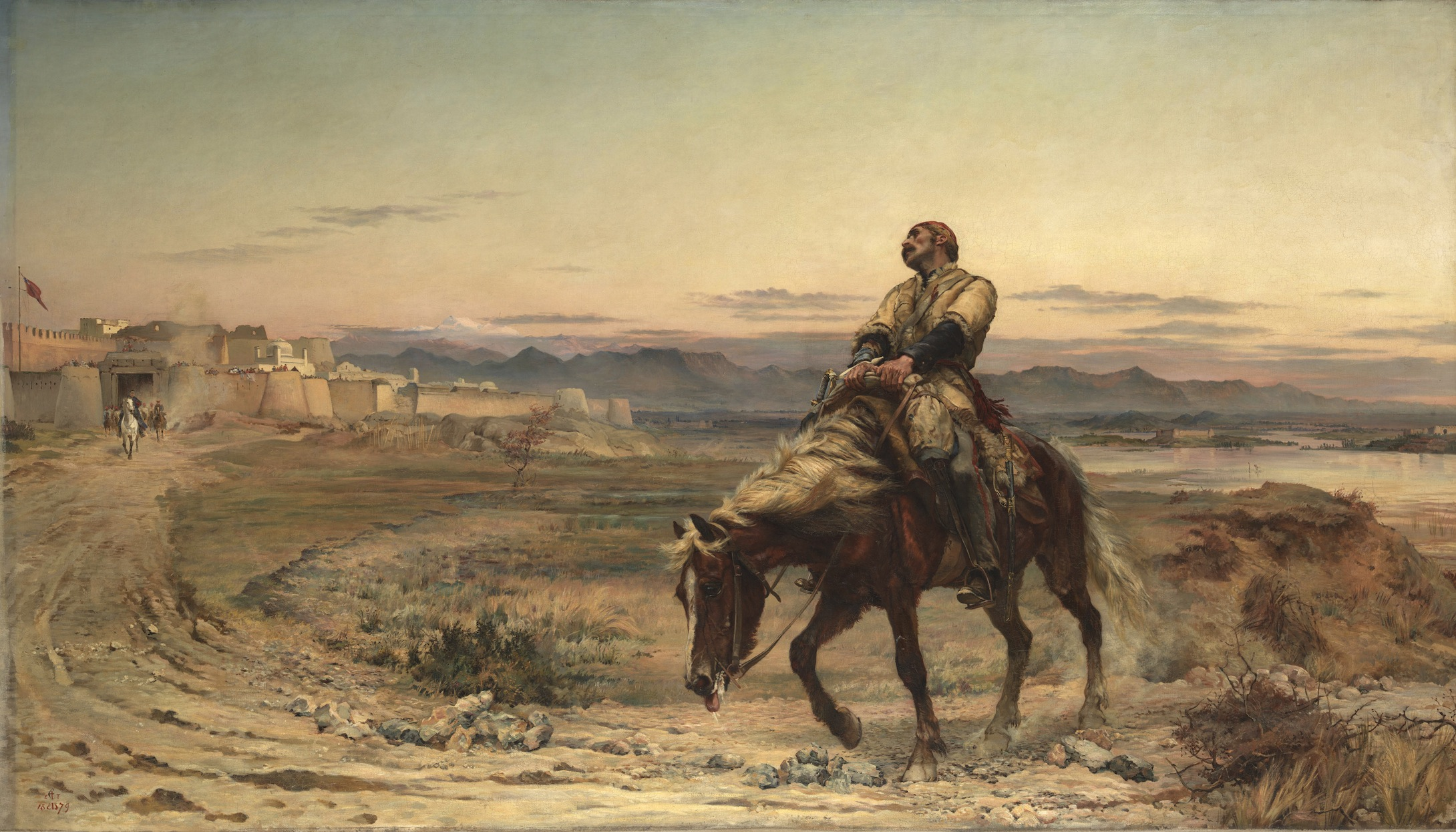
Remnants of an Army by Elizabeth Butler depicts Dr. Brydon arriving at Jalalabad

After returning to England in 1846, Pollock benefited from an annuity of £1,000 per annum from the East India Company and lived at Clapham Common. He was promoted to lieutenant general on 11 November 1851 and became a member of the Court of Directors of the East India Company in 1854. Promoted to full general on 17 May 1859, he was appointed Knight Commander of the Order of the Star of India on 19 August 1861 and advanced to Knight Grand Commander of the Order of the Star of India on 24 May 1866. Promoted to field marshal on 24 May 1870, he became Constable of the Tower in November 1871, before being made a baronet on 20 March 1872. In retirement he also served as honorary colonel of the 1st Surrey (or South London) Rifle Volunteer Battalion. He died at Walmer in Kent on 6 October 1872 and was buried in the north aisle at Westminster Abbey.

== Family ==
In 1810 Pollock married Frances Webbe Barclay; they had four sons and one daughter. His eldest son Frederick succeeded him as 2nd Baronet Pollock of the Khyber Pass, his second son George David Pollock became a celebrated surgeon and pioneered the use of skin grafts, whilst his third son Robert was killed at the Battle of Mudki in 1845. After his first wife's death, he married Henrietta Wollaston in 1852.

== Sources ==
- Colley, Linda (2003). Captives - Britain, Empire and the World 1600-1850. Pimlico. ISBN 0-7126-6528-5.
- Heathcote, Tony (1999). The British Field Marshals, 1736–1997: A Biographical Dictionary. Barnsley: Leo Cooper. ISBN 0-85052-696-5.
- Greenwood, Joseph (1844). Narrative of the Late Victorious Campaign in Afghanistan under General Pollock. London.
- Low, Charles (1873). Life and Correspondence of Sir George Pollock. London.

Honorary titles
Preceded by Sir John Fox Burgoyne, Bt	Constable of the Tower; Lord Lieutenant of the Tower Hamlets; 1871–1872	Succeeded by Sir William Maynard Gomm
Baronetage of the United Kingdom
New creation	Baronet (of The Khyber Pass); 1872	Succeeded by Frederick Montagu-Pollock
