= William Brydon =

British soldier (1811–1873)

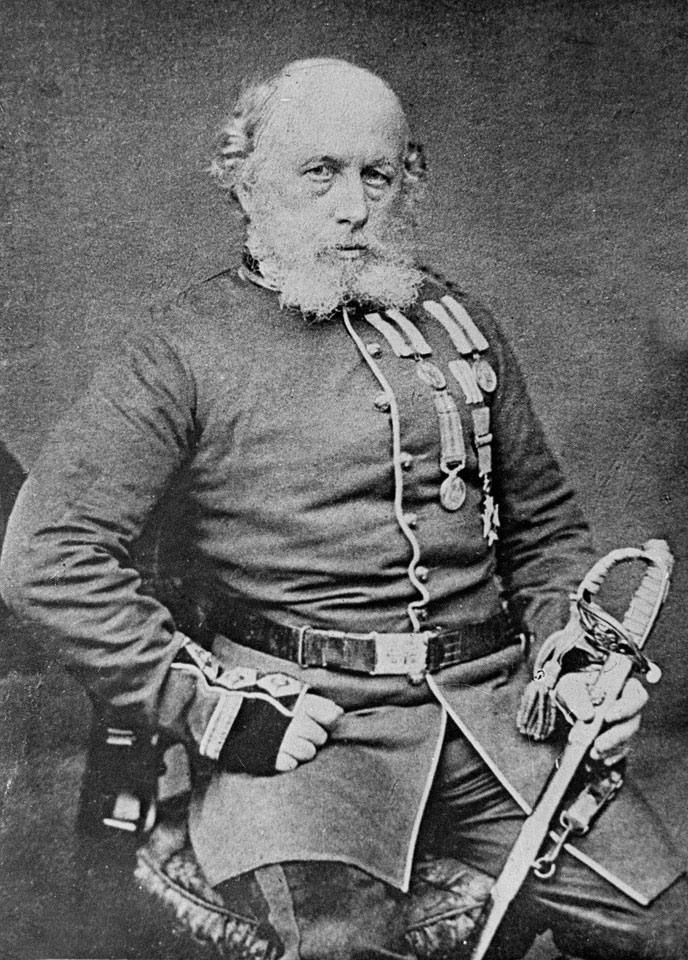
- Brydon, c. 1864
- Born: 10 October 1811; London, England
- Died: 20 March 1873 (aged 61); Nigg, Highland, Scotland
- Burial place: Rosemarkie churchyard
- Education: University College London; University of Edinburgh
- Relatives: Major General Donald Macintyre (brother-in-law)
- Military career
- Allegiance: United Kingdom
- Rank: Surgeon
- Unit: Bengal Army
- Conflicts: First Anglo-Afghan War; Second Anglo-Burmese War; Indian mutiny
- Awards: Companion of the Order of the Bath

William Brydon CB (10 October 1811 – 20 March 1873) was a British medical doctor who was assistant surgeon in the Bengal Army during the First Anglo-Afghan War, famous for reportedly being the only member of an army of 4,500 men, plus 12,000 accompanying civilians, to reach safety in Jalalabad at the end of the 1842 retreat from Kabul. He also saw action during the Siege of Lucknow when he was holed up alongside Henry Lawrence.

== Early life ==
Brydon was born in London, second son and second of eight children of merchant William Brydon (1761-1843) and Mary Ann (1783-1841), née Comberbach. He studied medicine at University College London and at the University of Edinburgh. In 1835, he subsequently was appointed as an assistant surgeon in the Bengal Army of the British East India Company.

== Retreat from Kabul ==
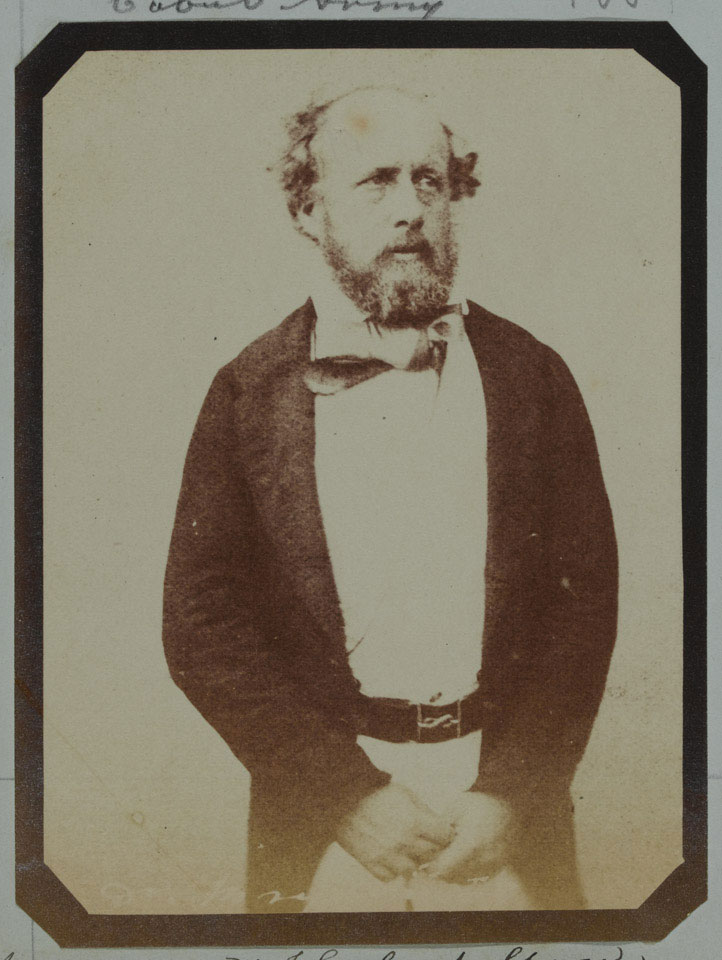
'Dr Brydon only survivor of Cabul Army', photograph by John McCosh, 1850

In 1841 William Brydon was posted to Afghanistan as the assistant surgeon of Shah Shuja's Contingent—a British officered infantry force recruited in India to provide protection for the British-backed ruler in Kabul. This mercenary unit formed part of a combined British and Indian army which occupied the city in August 1839.

In January 1842, following the killing of the two British representatives there, it was decided to withdraw the British force in Kabul. The nearest British garrison was in Jalalabad, 90 miles (140 km) away, and the army would need to go through mountain passes with the January snow hindering them.

Under the command of Major-General William George Keith Elphinstone, 4,500 British and Indian soldiers plus 12,000 civilian camp followers, including wives and children, set out for Jalalabad on 6 January 1842, on the understanding that they had been offered safe passage. Afghan tribesmen intercepted them and proceeded to attack them during the next seven days. Brydon recorded in his diary that as early as the first night of the retreat many of his sepoys were crippled by frostbite and had to be abandoned in the snow.

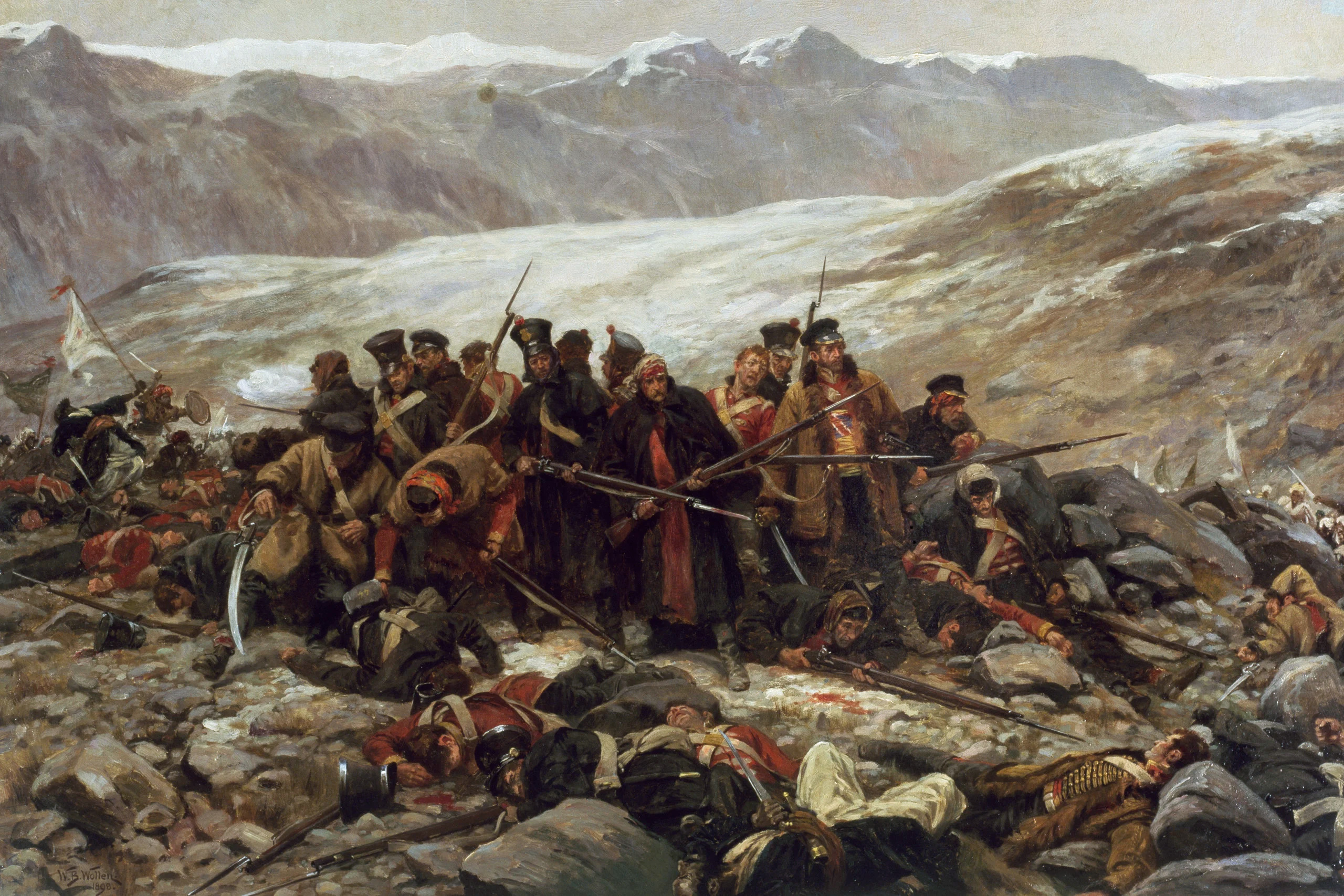
The Last Stand of the 44th Regiment at Gundamuck by William Barnes Wollen

By the fourth day of the retreat Brydon's regiment had virtually ceased to exist though he himself was fortunate enough to have found some food abandoned by Lady Macnaghten—the wife of the British envoy murdered in Kabul. The final stand took place at Gandamak on the morning of 13 January 1842, in the snow. Twenty officers and forty-five British soldiers, mostly of the 44th Foot, found themselves surrounded on a hillock. The Afghans attempted to persuade the soldiers that they intended them no harm. Then the sniping began, followed by a series of rushes. Captain Souter wrapped the regimental colours around his body and was dragged into captivity with a sergeant named Fair and seven privates. The remainder were shot or cut down.

Surgeon Brydon was one of twelve mounted officers who had become separated from the remnants of the main column before the final stand at Gandamak. This small group had ridden to Futtehabad, but half had been killed there while six escaped. All but Brydon were killed, one by one, further along the road as their horses became exhausted. Both Brydon and his pony were wounded in the course of encounters with small Afghan parties. On the afternoon of 13 January 1842, the British troops in Jalalabad, watching for their comrades of the Kabul garrison, saw a single figure ride up to the town walls. It was Brydon. Part of his skull had been sheared off by an Afghan sword, and he survived the blow because he had stuffed a copy of Blackwood's Magazine into his hat to fight the intense cold weather. The magazine took most of the blow, saving the doctor's life.

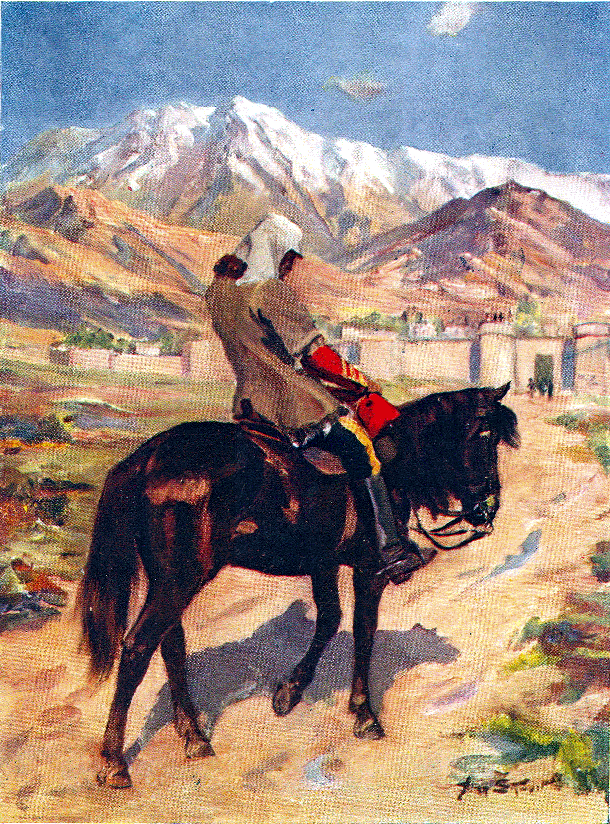
Brydon reaches Jellalabad alone

Brydon became widely, if inaccurately, known as being the only survivor of the entire army. In fact, he was not the only European to survive the retreat; about 115 British officers, soldiers, wives and children were captured or taken as hostages and survived to be subsequently released. Included, was the wife of Sir Robert Sale, Lady Sale, though not Elphinstone, who died in captivity. Nor was Brydon the only European to survive the trek from Kabul to Jalalabad without spending time in captivity; by Brydon's own account, and that of others, a "Greek merchant", a Mr Baness, also made it to Jalalabad, arriving two days after Brydon but surviving for only one day. In addition a small number of Indian sepoys reached Jalalabad on foot over the subsequent weeks. One sepoy, havildar Sita Ram, escaped from Afghanistan after 21 months of slavery and rejoined his former regiment at Delhi. About 2,000 sepoys and an unrecorded number of camp followers were eventually found in Kabul and brought back to India by Pollock's "Army of Retribution" following their occupation of the city.

The episode was made the subject of a famous painting, "Remnants of an Army", by the Victorian artist Lady Butler, who portrayed Brydon approaching the gates of the Jalalabad fort perched on his exhausted horse which, according to Brydon, collapsed and died when put in a stable after arrival in the city.

== Subsequent career and death ==
Upon recovering from his wound Brydon resumed his duties as a regimental surgeon with the "Army of Retribution" under General Pollock, which briefly reoccupied Kabul in September 1842. He narrowly escaped death from an enemy shell during this campaign. In 1849, he was promoted to the rank of surgeon.

Brydon fought in the Second Anglo-Burmese War of 1852, when Rangoon was taken.

At the time of the Sepoy Rebellion of 1857, Brydon was still serving as a surgeon of the Bengal Army. Stationed in Lucknow along with his wife and children, Brydon survived his second siege; that of the Lucknow residency (June – November 1857), in which he was badly wounded in the thigh. He was appointed a Companion of the Order of the Bath (CB) in November 1858. His wife, Colina Maxwell Brydon, published a memoir of the siege.

Brydon died at his home Westfield near Nigg in Ross-shire on 20 March 1873, and is buried in Rosemarkie churchyard alongside his brother-in-law Donald MacIntyre VC.
