= Frank Souter =

British colonial policeman (1831–1888

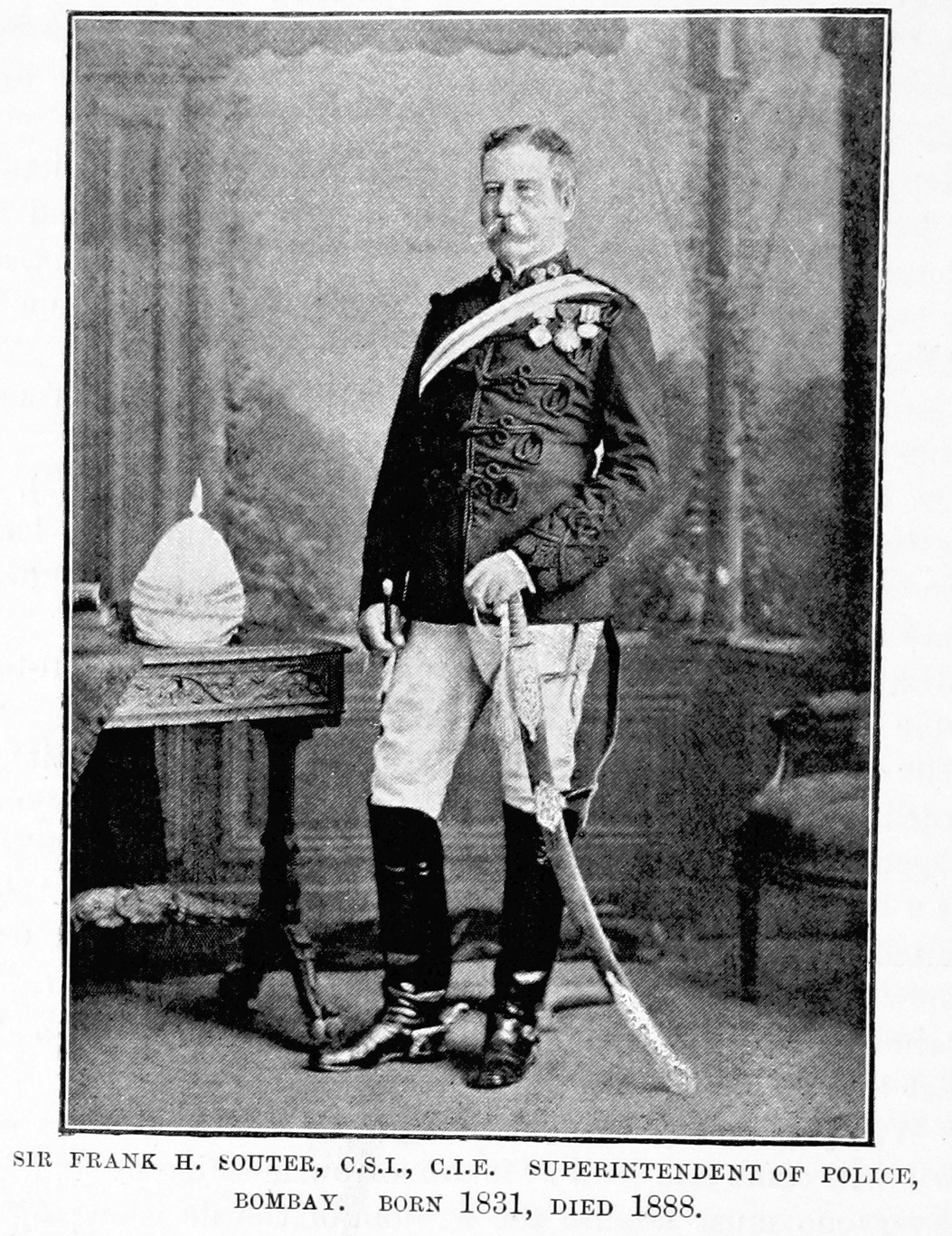
Frank Henry Andrew Souter Bombay Police Commissioner 1864-1888

Sir Frank Henry Andrew Souter CSI CIE (30 June 1831 – 5 June 1888) was a British policeman who was the first Police Commissioner of Bombay, serving from 1864 to 1888.

== Parentage ==
His father was Captain Thomas Alexander Souter, an officer in the 44th Regiment of Foot who became a prisoner in Afghanistan during the 1842 retreat from Kabul.

== Rise to prominence ==
Souter served as a volunteer fighter in 1850 against the rebels in the Nizam's dominions. In 1854, he was appointed Superintendent of Police in Dharwar. Subsequently, he was credited and awarded a sword of honour for the capture of the Nargund rebel chief during the Mutiny of 1857. In 1859 he put to death a notorious outlaw named Bhagoji Naik and captured the latter's followers, thus ending the activities of the Bhil brigands in northern Deccan; this and other acts of courage earned Souter a recommendation for the Victoria Cross. Though this never materialised, in 1868 he was made Companion to the Order of the Star of India (CSI), and in 1875 was knighted by the Prince of Wales.

== Incumbency as Police Commissioner ==
The office of the Commissioner of Police came into being after a Colonel Bruce, Inspector-General of Police with the Government of India, was sent to Bombay in 1864 to investigate local conditions and to make recommendations regarding the local police force. Souter served thereas from 1864 to 1888. Among Souter's responsibilities were the routine policing of crime, including the capture of three Europeans and an Austrian who murdered four Marwardis in 1866, and the supervision of some 8,000 Muslim pilgrims transiting through Bombay for the Hajj.

The traditional systems of Magistrates of Police and the Court of Petty Sessions were fully in force during the first thirteen years of Souter's term of office; however, these were later replaced by the Presidency Magistrates. In the beginning, annual reports on police matters were prepared by the Senior Magistrate, and later by the Chief Presidency Magistrate. However, the Bombay Government abolished these magisterial reports in 1883 because they contained mainly sad statistics, and replaced them with administrative reports prepared by Souter.

During the latter years of his incumbency, Souter found his police force seriously understaffed and underpaid. At one point, he decried the police-to-population ratio of 1 to 506 as well as the meager pay of Rs 10 per month received by the lowest-ranked constable. He also expressed disapproval of the inability of most of his men to read and write. Although the Bombay Government was sympathetic to Souter's concerns, all it could do was to increase the size of the police force by about 100 men, which was still seriously inadequate.

== Retirement and death ==
On 30 April 1888, Sir Frank Souter resigned his position as Police Commissioner. On 5 June, he died in his place of retirement, the Nilgiris in the Madras Presidency.
