= First Anglo-Afghan War =

1838–1842 British-Afghan war

- Part of the Great Game
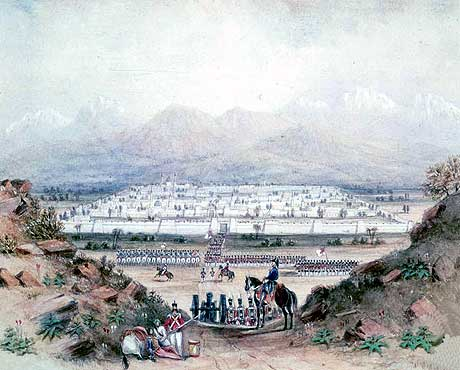
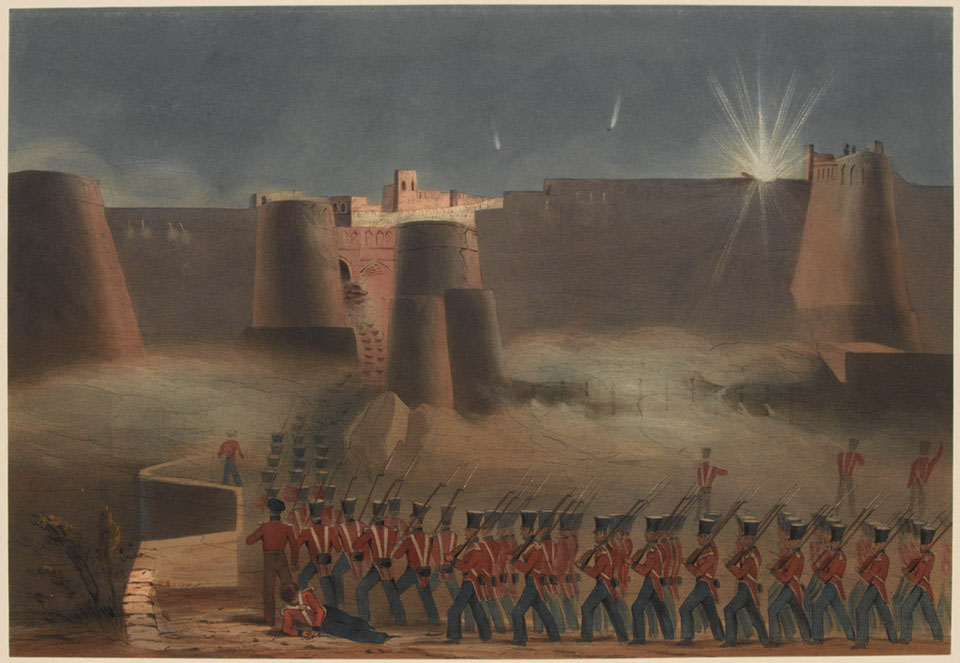
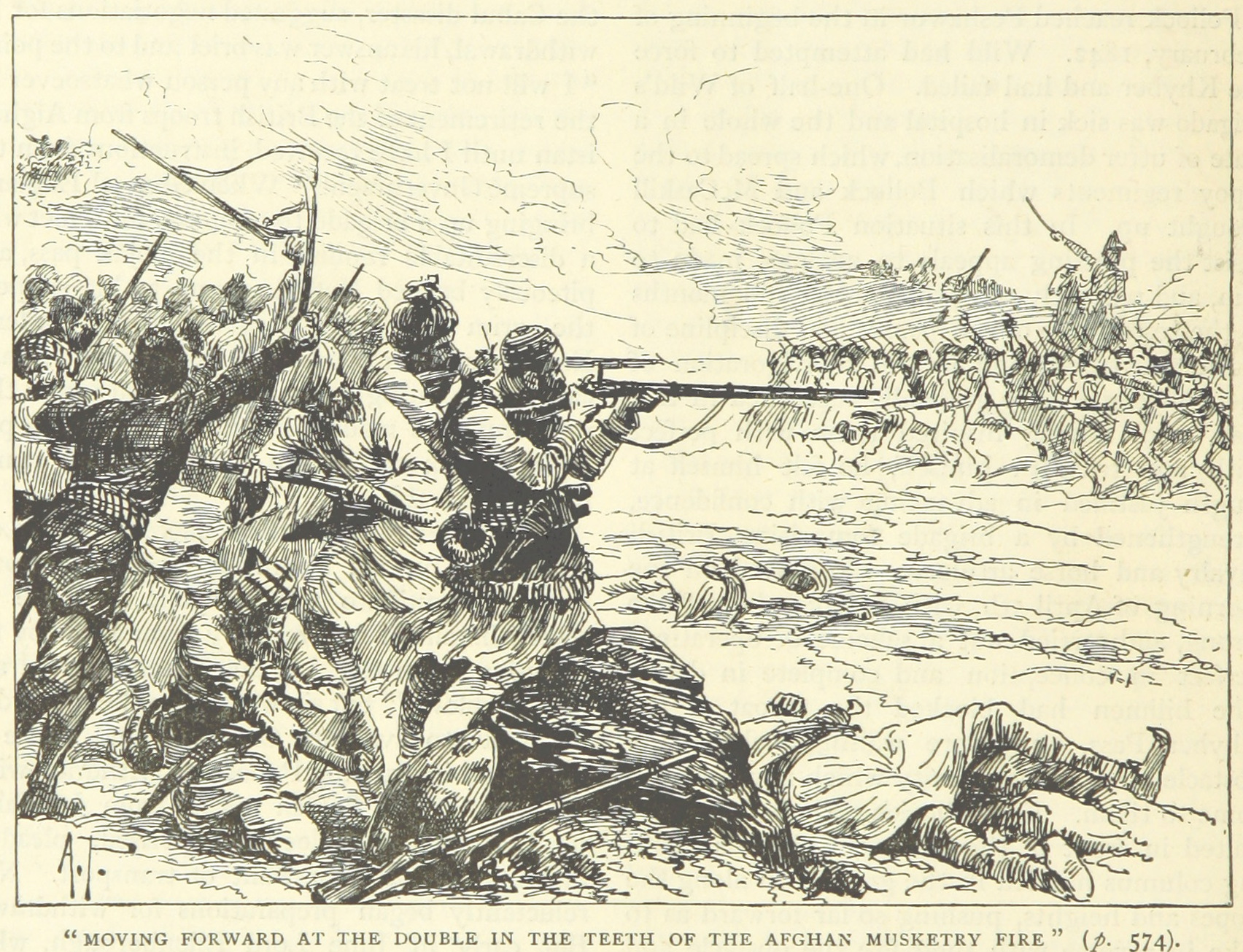
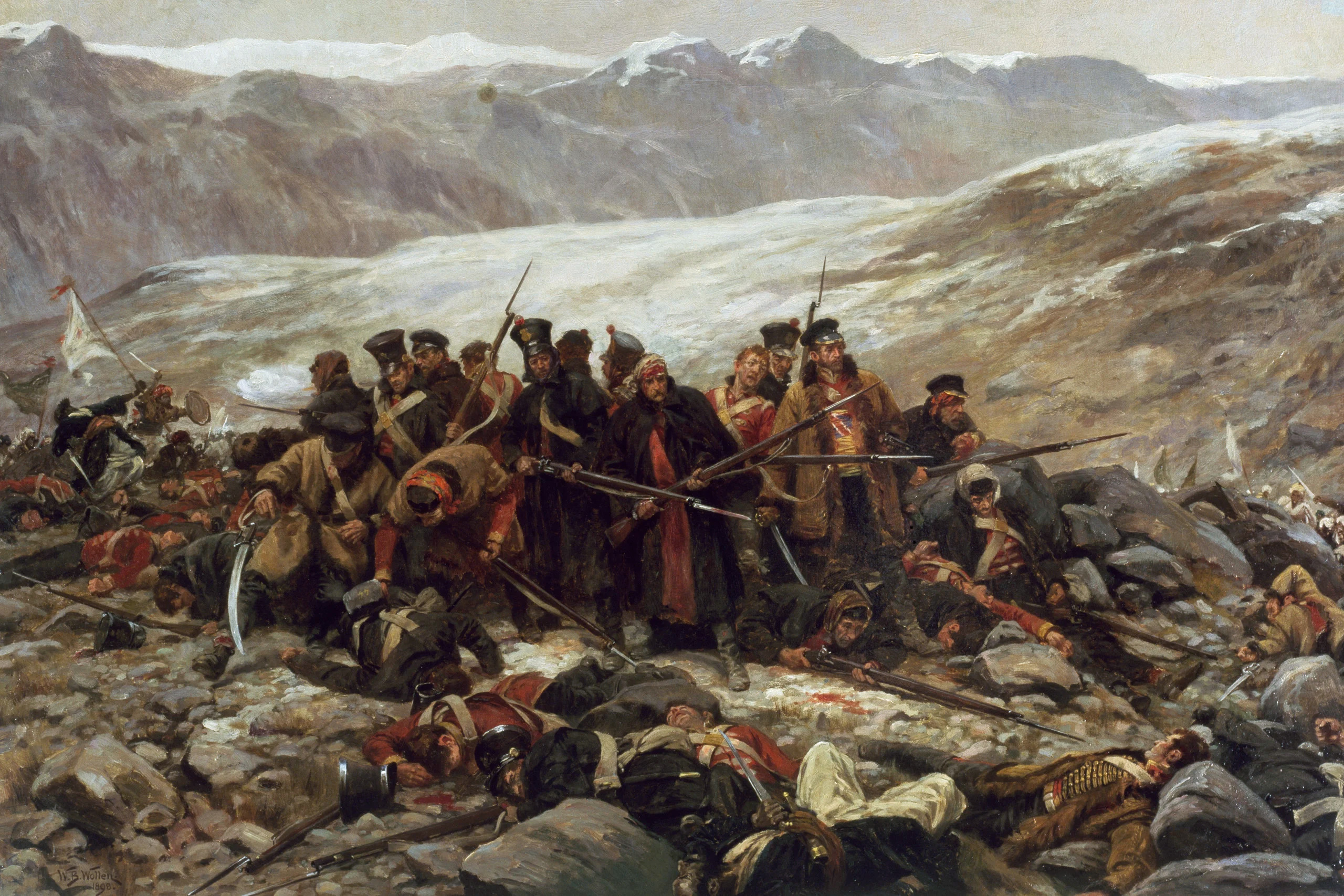
- Clockwise from top left: Army of the Indus passing through the Bolan Pass; Entry to Kandahar; Siege of Khelat; Massacre of Elphinstone's Army; Battle of Jalalabad; Battle of Ghazni
Date	1 October 1838 – 12 October 1842 (4 years, 1 week and 4 days)
Location	Afghanistan
Result	Barakzai Afghan victory

Belligerents
Durranis; Durrani Empire: British Empire; East India Company; Sikh Empire; Sindh Kingdom; Maimana Khanate; Tashqurghan (Khulm) (Note: August 1840; September 1840 – November 1841); Durrani loyalists	Barakzais; Emirate of Kabul; Principality of Kandahar; Hotak–Tokhi Ghiljis; Khanate of Kalat; Marri-Bugti Country; Tashqurghan (Khulm) (Note: May–August 1840; September 1840; from November 1841); Afghan rebels

Commanders and leaders
Shuja Shah Durrani X Fateh Jang Durrani (surrendered) Durranis: Timur Mirza Durrani; Shahpur Mirza Durrani; Safdar Jang Durrani (AWOL); Zaman Shah Durrani; Mullah Shakar; Mohammad Osman Khan (surrendered); Ghulam Khan Popalzai (surrendered); Nawab Zaman Khan (surrendered); Sayyid Mohammad Khan (surrendered); (British Empire) Robert Peel (British Empire) William Lamb (British Empire) William Elphinstone † British: (East India Company) Lord Auckland; (East India Company) Sir Henry William Barnard; (East India Company) John Keane; (East India Company) Sir Willoughby Cotton; (East India Company) George Pollock; (East India Company) Henry Marion Durand; (East India Company) Robert Sale; (East India Company) Thomas Willshire; (East India Company) James Outram; (East India Company) Lewis Brown; (East India Company) John Shelton (POW); (East India Company) John Connolly †; (East India Company) William Hay Macnaghten †; (East India Company) Robert Salusbury Trevor †; (East India Company) Edward Connolly †; (East India Company) Alexander Burnes †; (East India Company) Percival Lord †; Ranjit Singh # Durrani loyalists: Mizrab Khan; Mohammad Amin Beg (AWOL); Hajji Khan Kakar (AWOL)	Dost Mohammad Khan (surrendered); Mohammad Akbar Khan (WIA) Kabul: Mohammad Afzal Khan (WIA); Ghulam Haidar Khan (surrendered); Nawab Jabbar Khan (surrendered); Mohammad Akram Khan; Mohammad Zaman Khan; Kohan Dil Khan Kandahar: Rahim Dil Khan; Mehr Dil Khan; Mehrab Khan II Ahmadzai † Afghan rebels: Mir Masjidi Khan X; Akhtar Khan (executed); Abdullah Khan Achakzai; Aminullah Khan Logari; Mohammad Shah Khan Sulaimankhail

Casualties and losses
15,000–40,000 British, Sepoys, and camp followers dead	Unknown

The First Anglo-Afghan War (Note: Pashto: د افغان او انگرېز لومړۍ جگړه, romanized: Də Afğān au Angrez lumṛəi jagṛa [d̪ə ʔäʊ.ɣɑn/ʔäp.ɣɑn ʔäʊ ʔäŋg.ɾez lum.ɽəɪ d͡ʒäg.ɽä]; Persian: جنگ اول انگلیس و افغان, romanized: Jang-i awwal-i Afğān wa Inglīs [d͡ʒäŋg‿ɪ ʔäw.wál‿ɪ ʔäv.ɣɑ́ːn/ʔäf.ɣɑ́ːn ʔʊ ʔɪŋɡ.liːs]) was fought between the Durranis backed by the British Empire and the Sikh Empire, and the Barakzais of Kabul and Kandahar, alongside their regional allies, from 1838 to 1842. The British intervened in a succession dispute stemming from the Durrani succession struggle and backed former king Shuja Shah Durrani, whom they restored to the throne after occupying Kabul in August 1839. It was one of the first major conflicts during the Great Game, the 19th century competition for power and influence in Central Asia between Britain and Russia.

The British-led force and its camp followers were later almost completely destroyed during the 1842 retreat from Kabul, which was later avenged by a widely termed "Army of Retribution." The British forces left Afghanistan after recovering prisoners. Shuja Shah Durrani was succeeded by his son Fateh Jang Durrani following his assassination. Fateh Jang later abdicated and passed the throne to his younger brother Shahpur Mirza Durrani, whose brief reign supervised by Mohammad Akbar Khan, ended with the return of Dost Mohammad Khan from exile in India.

== Background ==
=== Causes ===
The 19th century was a period of diplomatic competition between the British and Russian empires for spheres of influence in South Asia known as the "Great Game" to the British and the "Tournament of Shadows" to the Russians. With the exception of Emperor Paul (whose 1800 order to invade India was cancelled after his assassination in 1801), no Russian tsar ever seriously considered invading India. However, for most of the 19th century, Russia was viewed as "the enemy" in Britain; any Russian advance into Central Asia, into what is now Kazakhstan, Turkmenistan, Kyrgyzstan, Uzbekistan and Tajikistan, was always assumed (in London) to be directed towards the conquest of India, as the American historian David Fromkin observed, "no matter how far-fetched" such an interpretation might be. In 1832, the First Reform Bill lowering the franchise requirements to vote and hold office in the United Kingdom was passed, which the ultra-conservative Emperor Nicholas I of Russia openly disapproved of, setting the stage for an Anglo-Russian "cold war", with many believing that Russian autocracy and British democracy were bound to clash. In 1837, Lord Palmerston and John Hobhouse, fearing the instability of Afghanistan, the Sindh, and the increasing power of the Sikh kingdom to the northwest, raised the spectre of a possible Russian invasion of British India through Afghanistan. The British tended to misunderstand the foreign policy of the Emperor Nicholas I as anti-British and intent upon an expansionary policy in Asia; whereas in fact though Nicholas disliked Britain as a liberal democratic state that he considered to be rather "strange", he always believed it was possible to reach an understanding with Britain on spheres of influence in Asia, believing that the essentially conservative nature of British society would retard the advent of liberalism. The main goal of Nicholas's foreign policy was not the conquest of Asia, but rather upholding the status quo in Europe, especially by co-operating with Prussia and Austria, and in isolating France, as Louis Philippe I, the King of the French was a man whom Nicholas hated as an "usurper". The duc d'Orleans had once been Nicholas's friend, but when he assumed the throne of France after the revolution of 1830, Nicholas was consumed with hatred for his former friend who, as he saw it, had gone over to what he perceived as the dark side of liberalism. The idea that Russia was a threat to the East India Company is one version of events. Scholars now favour a different interpretation that the fear of the East India Company was in fact the decision of Dost Mohammed Khan and the Qajar Ruler of Iran to form an alliance and extinguish Sikh rule in Punjab. The British feared that an invading Islamic army would lead to an uprising in India by the people and princely states therefore it was decided to replace Dost Mohammed Khan with a more pliant ruler. "Rumours could cost lives and Empire itself. Therefore instead of fixating on the oriental other, the East India Company played up the threat of the Russian bear".

In 1834, Shah Shuja Durrani invaded Kandahar with the aid of the British, but was defeated.

The Company sent an envoy to Kabul to form an alliance with Afghanistan's Amir, Dost Mohammad Khan against Russia. Amidst the Afghan civil war, the Sikhs seized Peshawar from the Peshawar sardars and subjugated them. The British feared the Dal Khalsa, and they considered the Sikh army to be a far more formidable threat than the Afghans who did not have a well-disciplined army, instead of having only a tribal levy where under the banner of jihad tribesmen would come out to fight for the Emir. For this reason, Lord Auckland preferred an alliance with the Punjab over an alliance with Afghanistan. The British could have had an alliance with the Punjab or Afghanistan, but not both at the same time.

When Governor-General of India Lord Auckland heard about the arrival of Russian envoy Count Jan Prosper Witkiewicz (better known by the Russian version of his name as Yan Vitkevich) in Kabul and the possibility that Dost Mohammad might turn to Russia for support, his political advisers exaggerated the threat. Alexander Burnes, the Scotsman who served as the East India Company's chief political officer in Afghanistan, described Witkiewicz: "He was a gentlemanly and agreeable man, of about thirty years of age, spoke French, Turkish and Persian fluently, and wore the uniform of an officer of the Cossacks". The presence of Witkiewicz had thrown Burnes into a state of despair, leading one contemporary to note that he "abandoned himself to despair, bound his head with wet towels and handkerchiefs and took to the smelling bottle". Dost Mohammad had in fact invited Count Witkiewicz to Kabul as a way to frighten the British into making an alliance with him against his archenemy Ranjit Singh, the Maharaja of the Punjab, not because he really wanted an alliance with Russia. The British had the power to compel Singh to return the former Afghan territories he had conquered whereas the Russians did not, which explains why Dost Mohammad Khan wanted an alliance with the British. Burnes wrote home after having dinner with Count Witkiewicz and Dost Mohammad in late December 1837: "We are in a mess home. The emperor of Russia has sent an envoy to Kabul to offer...money [to the Afghans] to fight Rajeet Singh!!! I could not believe my own eyes or ears." On 20 January 1838, Lord Auckland sent an ultimatum to Dost Mohammad telling him: "You must desist from all correspondence with Russia. You must never receive agents from them, or have aught to do with them without our sanction; you must dismiss Captain Viktevitch [Witkiewicz] with courtesy; you must surrender all claims to Peshawar". Burnes himself had complained that Lord Auckland's letter was "so dictatorial and supercilious as to indicate the writer's intention that it should give offense", and tried to avoid delivering it for long as possible. Dost Mohammad was indeed offended by the letter, but in order to avoid a war, he had his special military advisor, the American adventurer Josiah Harlan, engage in talks with Burnes to see if some compromise could be arranged. Burnes in fact had no power to negotiate anything, and Harlan complained that Burnes was just stalling, which led to Dost Mohammad expelling the British diplomatic mission on 26 April 1838.

British fears of a Persian and Afghan invasion of India took one step closer to becoming a reality when negotiations between the Afghans and Russians broke down in 1838. The Qajar dynasty of Persia, with Russian support, attempted the Siege of Herat. Herat, in Afghanistan, is a city that had historically belonged to Persia; the Qajar shahs had long desired to take it back. It is located in a plain so fertile that is known as the "Granary of Central Asia"; whoever controls Herat and the surrounding countryside also controls the largest source of grain in all of Central Asia. Russia, wanting to increase its presence in Central Asia, had formed an alliance with Qajar Persia, which had territorial disputes with Afghanistan as Herat had been part of the Safavid Persia before 1709. Lord Auckland's plan was to drive away the besiegers and replace Dost Mohammad with Shuja Shah Durrani, who had once ruled Afghanistan and who was willing to ally himself with anyone who might restore him to the Afghan throne. At one point, Shuja had hired an American adventurer - Josiah Harlan - to overthrow Dost Mohammad Khan, despite the fact Harlan's military experience comprised only working as a surgeon with the East India Company's troops in the First Burma War. Shuja Shah had been deposed in 1809 and had been living in exile in British India since 1818, collecting a pension from the East India Company, which believed that he might be useful one day. The British denied that they were invading Afghanistan, claiming they were merely supporting its "legitimate" Shuja government "against foreign interference and factious opposition." Shuja Shah by 1838 was barely remembered by most of his former subjects and those that did viewed him as a cruel, tyrannical ruler who, as the British were soon to learn, had almost no popular support in Afghanistan.

On 1 October 1838, Lord Auckland issued the Simla Declaration attacking Dost Mohammed Khan for making "an unprovoked attack" on the empire of "our ancient ally, Maharaja Ranjeet Singh", going on to declare that Shuja Shah was "popular throughout Afghanistan" and would enter his former realm "surrounded by his own troops and be supported against foreign interference and factious opposition by the British Army". As the Persians had broken off the siege of Herat and the Emperor Nicholas I of Russia had ordered Count Vitkevich home (he was to commit suicide upon reaching St. Petersburg), the reasons for attempting to put Shuja Shah back on the Afghan throne had vanished. The British historian Sir John William Kaye wrote that the failure of the Persians to take Herat "cut from under the feet of Lord Auckland all ground of justification and rendered the expedition across the Indus at once a folly and a crime". But at this point, Auckland was committed to putting Afghanistan into the British sphere of influence and nothing would stop him from going ahead with the invasion. On 25 November 1838, the two most powerful armies on the Indian subcontinent assembled in a grand review at Ferozepore as Ranjit Singh, the Maharajah of the Punjab brought out the Dal Khalsa to march alongside the sepoy troops of the East India Company and the British troops in India with Lord Auckland himself present amid much colorful pageantry and music as men dressed in brightly colored uniforms together with horses and elephants marched in an impressive demonstration of military might. Lord Auckland declared that the "Grand Army of the Indus" would now start the march on Kabul to depose Dost Mohammed and put Shuja Shah back on the Afghan throne, ostensibly because the latter was the rightful Emir, but in reality to place Afghanistan into the British sphere of influence. Speaking in the House of Lords, the Duke of Wellington condemned the invasion, saying that the real difficulties would only begin after the invasion's success, predicting that the Anglo-Indian forces would rout the Afghan tribal levy, only to find themselves struggling to hold on, as the Hindu Kush mountains and Afghanistan had no modern roads, and calling the entire operation "stupid" since Afghanistan was a land of "rocks, sands, deserts, ice and snow".

=== Forces ===
British India at this time was a proprietary colony run by the East India Company, which had been granted the right to rule India by the British Crown. India was only one of several proprietary colonies in the British Empire around the world, where various corporations or individuals had been granted the right to rule by the Crown, with for instance Rupert's Land, which was a vast tract covering most of what is now Canada being ruled by the Hudson's Bay Company, but India was easily the most wealthy and profitable of all the proprietary colonies. By the 19th century, the East India Company ruled 90 million Indians and controlled 70 million acres (243,000 square kilometres) of land under its own flag while issuing its own currency, making it into the most powerful corporation in the world. The East India Company had been granted monopolies on trade by the Crown, but it was not owned by the Crown, though the shares in the East India Company were owned by numerous MPs and aristocrats, creating a powerful Company lobby in Parliament while the Company regularly gave "gifts" to influential people in Britain. The East India Company was sufficiently wealthy to maintain the three Presidency armies, known after their presidencies as the Bengal Army, the Bombay Army and the Madras Army, with the supreme field headquarters for commanding these armies being at Simla. The East India Company's army totaled 200,000 men, making it one of the largest armies in the entire world, and was an army larger than those maintained by most European states. The majority of the men serving in the presidency armies were Indian, but the officers were all British, trained at the East India Company's own officer school at the Addiscombe estate outside of London. Furthermore, the politically powerful East India Company had regiments from the British Army sent to India to serve alongside the East India Company's army. Officers from the British Army serving in India tended to look down on officers serving in the company's army, and relations between the two armies were cool at best.

The regiments chosen for the invasion of Afghanistan came from the Bengal and Bombay armies. The commander in India, Sir Henry Fane, chose the regiments by drawing lots. The units from the Bengal Army going into Afghanistan were Skinner's Horse, the 43rd Native Infantry and the 2nd Light Cavalry, which were all Company regiments while the 16th Lancers and the 13th Somersetshire Light Infantry came from the British Army in India. The units from the Bombay Army chosen for the Grand Army of the Indus were the 19th Native Infantry and the Poona Local Horse, which were Company regiments, and the 2nd Queen's Regiment, the 17th Lincolnshire Regiment, and the 4th Dragoons, which were all British Army regiments. Of the two divisions of the Grand Army of the Indus, the Bombay division numbered fifty-six hundred men and the Bengal division numbered ninety-five hundred men. Shuja recruited 6,000 Indian mercenaries ("Shah Shujah's Levy") out of his pocket for the invasion. Ranjit Singh, the elderly and ailing Maharaja of the Punjab and the British assembled in a grand review at Ferozepore as Ranjit Singh, the Maharajah of the Punjab brought out the Dal Khalsa to march alongside the sepoy troops of the East India Company and the British troops in India. Ranjit Singh agreed to a treaty with the British viceroy Lord Auckland to restore Shah Shoja to the Afghan throne in Kabul. In pursuance of this agreement, the British army of the Indus entered Afghanistan from the south, while Ranjit Singh's troops went through the Khyber Pass and took part in the victory parade in Kabul. Accompanying the invasion force were 38,000 Indian camp followers and 30,000 camels to carry supplies.

The Emirate of Afghanistan had no army, and instead under the Afghan feudal system, the tribal chiefs contributed fighting men when the Emir called upon their services. The Afghans were divided into numerous ethnic groups, of which the largest were the Pashtuns, the Tajiks, the Uzbeks, and the Hazaras, who were all in their turn divided into numerous tribes and clans. Islam was the sole unifying factor binding these groups together, though the Hazaras were Shia Muslims while the rest were Sunni Muslims. The Pashtuns were the dominant ethnic group, and it was with the Pashtun tribes that the British interacted the most. The Pashtun tribesmen had no military training, but the ferociously warlike Pashtuns were forever fighting each other, when not being called up for service for the tribal levy by the Emir, meaning most Pashtun men had at least some experience of warfare. The Pashtun tribes lived by their strict moral code of Pashtunwali ("the way of the Pashtuns") stating various rules for a Pashtun man to live by, one of which was that a man had to avenge any insult, real or imagined, with violence, in order to be considered a man. The standard Afghan weapon was a matchlock rifle known as the jezail, the range and accuracy of which, combined with the sniping tactics of the Afghans, made it superior to the British Brown Bess smoothbore muskets.

== War ==
=== British invasion of Afghanistan ===
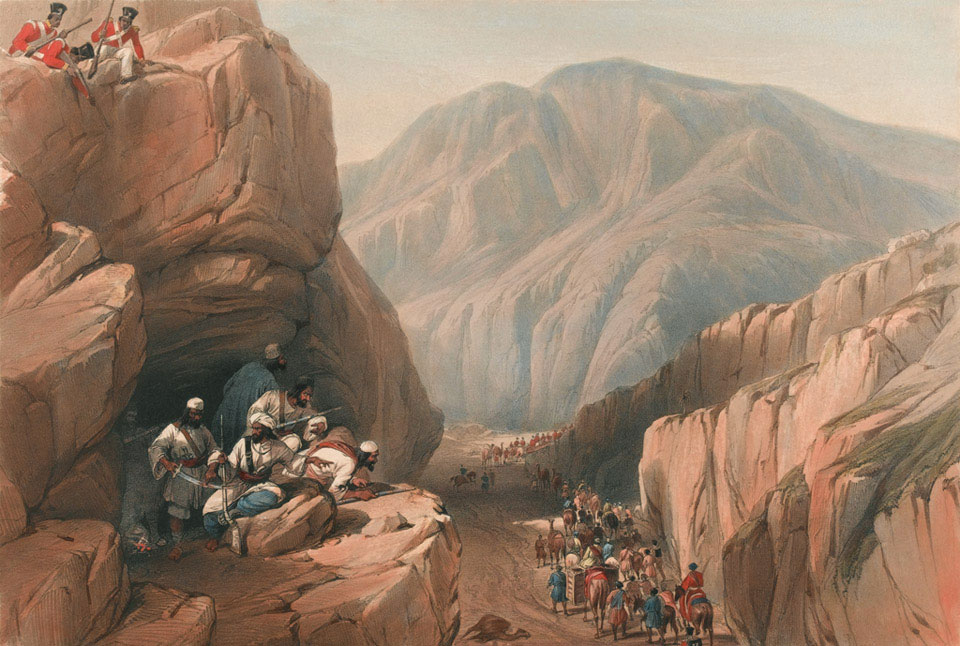
Sir-I-Khajur in the Bolan Pass, 1839

The "Army of the Indus" which included 21,000 British and Indian troops under the command of John Keane, 1st Baron Keane (subsequently replaced by Sir Willoughby Cotton and then by William Elphinstone) set out from Punjab in December 1838. With them was William Hay Macnaghten, the former chief secretary of the Calcutta government, who had been selected as Britain's chief representative to Kabul. It included an immense train of 38,000 camp followers and 30,000 camels, plus a large herd of cattle. The British intended to be comfortable – one regiment took its pack of foxhounds, another took two camels to carry its cigarettes, junior officers were accompanied by up to 40 servants, and one senior officer required 60 camels to carry his personal effects.

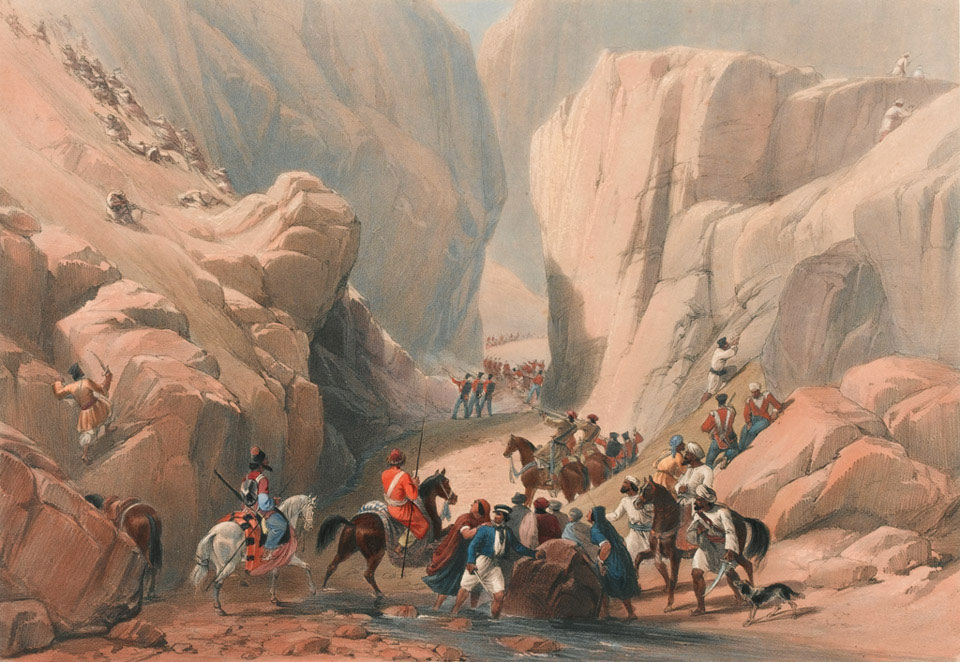
The Opening in to the Narrow Path above the Siri Bolan from James Atkinson's Sketches in Afghaunistan

By late March 1839 the British forces had crossed the Bolan Pass, reached the southern Afghan city of Quetta, and begun their march to Kabul. They advanced through rough terrain, across deserts and 4,000-metre-high mountain passes, but made good progress and finally set up camps at Kandahar on 25 April 1839. After reaching Kandahar, Keane decided to wait for the crops to ripen before resuming his march, so it was not until 27 June that the Grand Army of the Indus marched again. Keane left behind his siege engines in Kandahar, which turned out to be a mistake as he discovered that the walls of the Ghazni fortress were far stronger than he expected. A deserter, Abdul Rashed Khan, a nephew of Dost Mohammad Khan, informed the British that one of the gates of the fortress was in bad state of repair and might be blasted open with a gunpowder charge. Before the fortress, the British were attacked by a force of the Ghilji tribesmen fighting under the banner of jihad who were desperate to kill farangis, a pejorative Pashtun term for the British, and were beaten off. The British took fifty prisoners who were brought before Shuja, where one of them stabbed a minister to death with a hidden knife. Shuja had them all beheaded, which led Sir John Kaye, in his official history of the war, to write this act of "wanton barbarity", the "shrill cry" of the Ghazis, would be remembered as the "funeral wail" of the government's "unholy policy".

On 23 July 1839, in a surprise attack, the British-led forces captured the fortress of Ghazni, which overlooks a plain leading eastward into the Khyber Pakhtunkhwa. The British troops blew up one city gate and marched into the city in a euphoric mood. During the battle, the British suffered 200 killed and wounded, while the Afghans suffered 500 killed and 1,500 captured. Ghazni was well-supplied, which eased the further advance considerably.

Following this and an uprising of Tajiks in Istalif, the British marched to Kabul with no resistance from Dost Mohammad's troops. With his situation rapidly deteriorating, Dost Mohammed offered to accept Shuja as his overlord in exchange for becoming his wazir (a common practice in Pashtunwali), which was promptly turned down. In August 1839, after thirty years, Shuja was again enthroned in Kabul. Shuja promptly confirmed his reputation for cruelty by seeking to wreak vengeance on all who had crossed him as he considered his own people to be "dogs" who needed to be taught to obey their master.

In the absence of the traditional winter capital of Peshawar, on November 2 Shuja left the Bala Hissar to seek refuge from the cold in Jalalabad.

=== Qalat/Kalat ===
On 13 November 1839, while en route to India, the Bombay column of the British Indian Army attacked, as a form of reprisal, the Baloch tribal fortress of Kalat, from where Baloch tribes had harassed and attacked British convoys during the move towards the Bolan Pass.

=== Battle of Parwan Darra and the “Surrender” of Dost Mohammad Khan (2 November 1840) ===
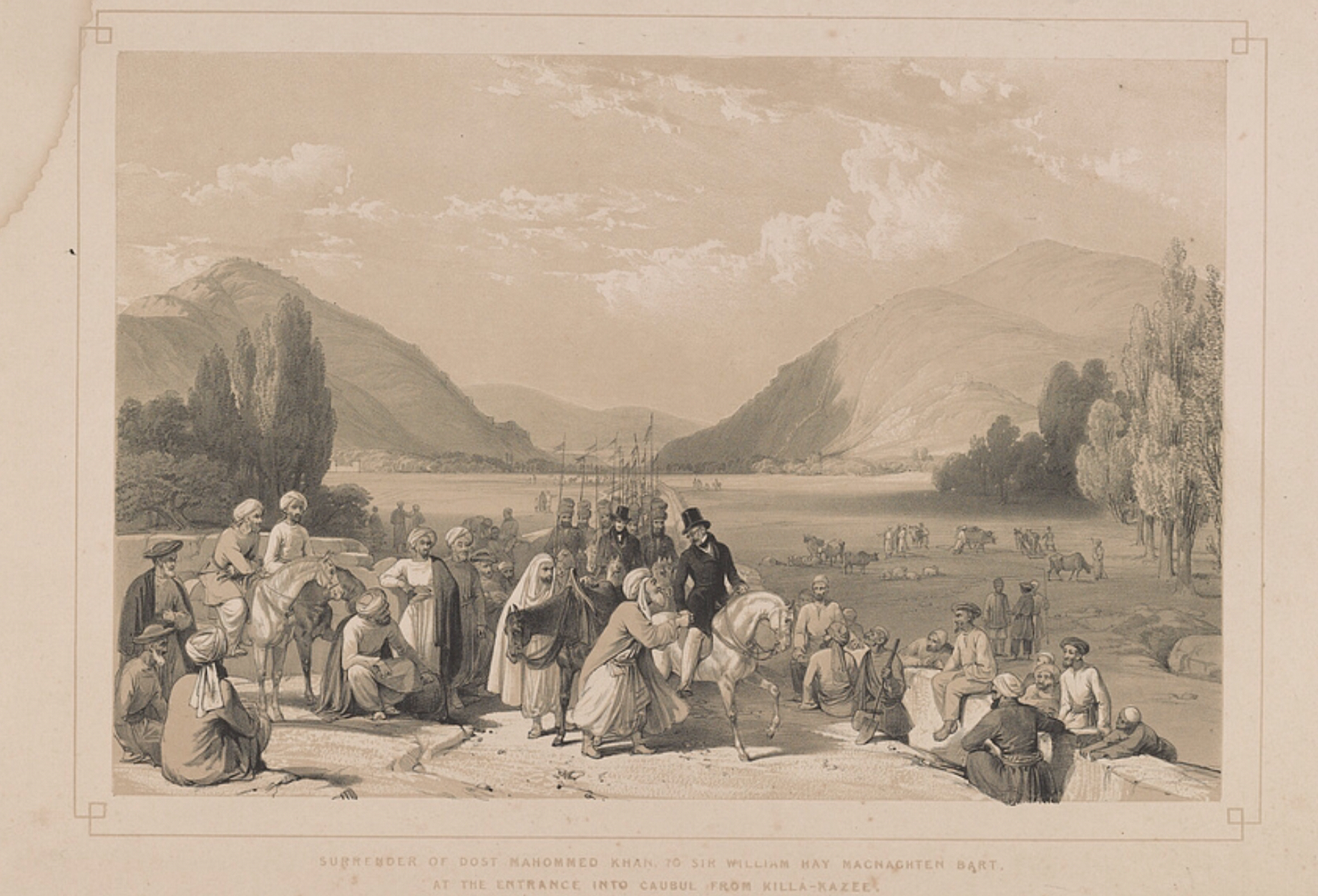
Dost Mohammad Khan's surrender in 1840 following his victory at Parwan Darra.

=== Occupation and rising of the Afghans ===
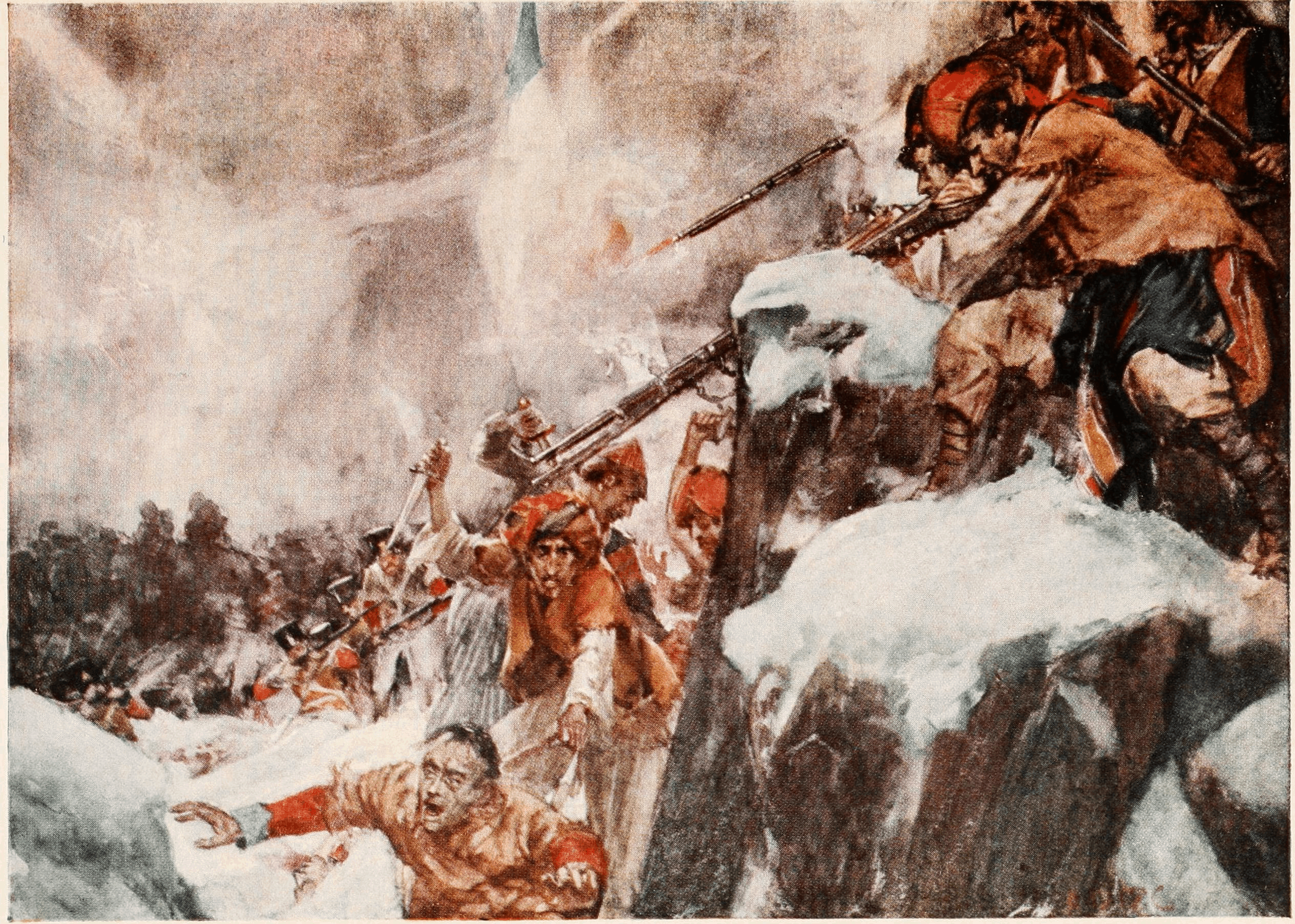
Afghan forces attacking retreating British-Indian troops

The majority of the British troops returned to India, leaving 8,000 in Afghanistan, but it soon became clear that Shuja's rule could only be maintained with the presence of a stronger British force. The Afghans resented the British presence and the rule of Shah Shuja. As the occupation dragged on, the East India Company's first political officer William Hay Macnaghten allowed his soldiers to bring their families to Afghanistan to improve morale; this further infuriated the Afghans, as it appeared the British were setting up a permanent occupation. Macnaghten purchased a mansion in Kabul, where he installed his wife, crystal chandelier, a fine selection of French wines, and hundreds of servants from India, making himself completely at home. Macnaghten, who had once been a judge in a small town in Ulster before deciding he wanted to be much more than a small town judge in Ireland, was known for his arrogant, imperious manner, and was simply called "the Envoy" by both the Afghans and the British. The wife of one British officer, Lady Florentia Sale created an English style garden at her house in Kabul, which was much admired and in August 1841 her daughter Alexadrina was married at her Kabul home to Lieutenant John Sturt of the Royal Engineers. The British officers staged horse races, played cricket and in winter ice skating over the frozen local ponds, which astonished the Afghans who had never seen this before.

Afghanistan had no army, and instead had a feudal system under which the chiefs would maintain a certain number of armed retainers, principally cavalry together with a number of tribesmen who could be called upon to fight in a time of war; when the Emir went to war, he would call upon his chiefs to bring out their men to fight for him. In 1840, the British strongly pressured Shuja to replace the feudal system with a standing army, which threatened to do away with the power of the chiefs, and which the Emir rejected under the grounds that Afghanistan lacked the financial ability to fund a standing army.

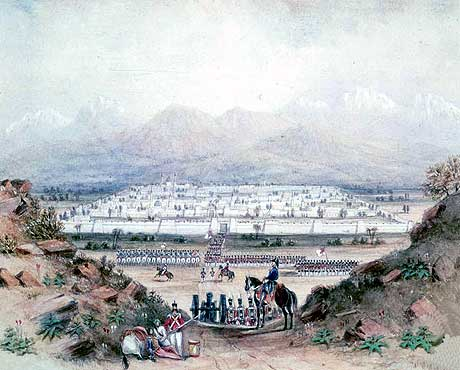
British army entering Kandahar

Dost Mohammad successfully defeated the British at the battle of Parwan Darra on 2 November 1840. However, following his victory, he surrendered and was sent to India in exile after hearing rumours of assassination plots against him.

In 1839–40, the entire rationale for the occupation of Afghanistan was changed by the Oriental Crisis when Mohammad Ali the Great, the vali (governor) of Egypt who was a close French ally, rebelled against the Sublime Porte; during the subsequent crisis, Russia and Britain co-operated against France, and with the improvement in Anglo-Russian relations, the need for a buffer state in Central Asia decreased. The Oriental Crisis of 1840 almost caused an Anglo-French war, which given the long-standing Franco-Russian rivalry caused by Nicholas's detestation of Louis-Philippe as a traitor to the conservative cause, inevitably improved relations between London and St. Petersburg, which ultimately led to the Emperor Nicholas making an imperial visit to London in 1844 to meet Queen Victoria and the Prime Minister Lord Peel. As early as 1838, Count Karl Nesselrode, the Russian Foreign Minister, had suggested to the British Ambassador in St. Petersburg, Lord Clanricarde, that Britain and Russia sign a treaty delimiting spheres of influence in Asia to end the "Great Game" once and for all. By 1840 Clanricarde was reporting to London that he was quite certain a mutually satisfactory agreement could be negotiated, and all he needed was the necessary permission from the Foreign Office to begin talks. From Calcutta, Lord Auckland pressed for acceptance of the Russian offer, writing "I would look forward to a tripartite Treaty of the West under which a limit shall be placed to the advance of England, Russia and Persia and under which all shall continue to repress slave dealing and plunder". Though Britain rejected the Russian offer, after 1840 there was a marked decline in Anglo-Russian rivalry and a "fair working relationship in Asia" had developed. The British Foreign Secretary Lord Palmerston rejected the Russian offer to end the "Great Game" as he believed that as long as the "Great Game" continued, Britain could inconvenience Russia in Asia to better achieve her foreign policy goals in Europe much more than Russia could inconvenience Britain in Asia to achieve her foreign policy goals in Europe. Palmerston noted that because the British had more money to bribe local rulers in Central Asia, this gave them the advantage in this "game", and it was thus better to keep the "Great Game" going. Palmerston believed it was Britain that held the advantage in the "Great Game", that the Russian offer to definitely mark out spheres of influence in Asia was a sign of weakness and he preferred no such treaty be signed. From Palmerston's viewpoint accepting the Russian offer would be unwelcome as the end of the "Great Game" in Asia would mean the redeployment of Russian power to Europe, the place that really counted for him, and it was better to keep the "Great Game" going, albeit at a reduced rate given the tensions with France. At the same time, the lowering of Anglo-Russian tension in the 1840s made holding Afghanistan more of an expensive luxury from the British viewpoint as it no longer seemed quite as essential to have a friendly government in Kabul anymore.

By this time, the British had vacated the fortress of Bala Hissar and relocated to a cantonment built to the northeast of Kabul. The chosen location was indefensible, being low and swampy with hills on every side. To make matters worse, the cantonment was too large for the number of troops camped in it and had a defensive perimeter almost two miles long. In addition, the stores and supplies were in a separate fort, 300 yards from the main cantonment. The British commander, Major-General George Keith Ephinstone who arrived in April 1841 was bed-ridden most of the time with gout and rheumatism.

Between April and October 1841, disaffected Afghan tribes were flocking to support resistance against the British in Bamiyan and other areas north of the Hindu Kush mountains. They were organised into an effective resistance by chiefs such as Mir Masjidi Khan and others. In September 1841, Macnaghten reduced the subsidies paid out to Ghilzai tribal chiefs in exchange for accepting Shuja as Emir and to keep the passes open, which immediately led to the Ghazis rebelling and a jihad being proclaimed. The monthly subsidies, which were effectively bribes for the Ghazi chiefs to stay loyal, was reduced from 80,000 to 40,000 rupees at a time of rampant inflation, and as the chiefs' loyalty had been entirely financial, the call of jihad proved stronger. Macnaghten did not take the threat seriously at first, writing to Henry Rawlinson in Kandahar on 7 October 1841: "The Eastern Ghilzyes are kicking up a row about some deductions which have been made from their pay. The rascals have completely succeeded in cutting communications for the time being, which is very provoking to me at this time; but they will be well trounced for their pains. One down, t'other come on, is the principle of these vagabonds".

Macnaghten ordered an expedition. On 10 October 1841, the Ghazis in a night raid defeated the Thirty-fifth Native Infantry, but were defeated the next day by the Thirteenth Light Infantry. After their defeat, which led to the rebels fleeing to the mountains, Macnaghten overplayed his hand by demanding that the chiefs who rebelled now send their children to Shuja's court as hostages to prevent another rebellion. As Shuja had a habit of mutilating people who displeased him in the slightest, Macnaghten's demand that the children of the chiefs go to the Emir's court was received with horror, which led the Ghazi chiefs to vow to fight on. Macnaghten, who had just been appointed as the governor of Bombay was torn between a desire to leave Afghanistan on a high note with the country settled and peaceful versus a desire to crush the Ghazis, which led him to temporize, at one moment threatening the harshest reprisals and the next moment, compromising by abandoning his demand for hostages. Macnaghten's alternating policy of confrontation and compromise was perceived as weakness, which encouraged the chiefs around Kabul to start rebelling. Shuja was so unpopular that many of his ministers and the Durrani clan joined the rebellion.

On the night of 1 November 1841, a group of Afghan chiefs met at the Kabul house of one of their number to plan the uprising, which began in the morning of the next day. In a flammable situation, the spark was provided unintentionally by the East India Company's second political officer, Sir Alexander 'Sekundar' Burnes. A Kashmiri slave girl who belonged to a Pashtun chief Abdullah Khan Achakzai living in Kabul ran away to Burne's house. When Ackakzai sent his retainers to retrieve her, it was discovered that Burnes had taken the slave girl to his bed, and he had one of Azkakzai's men beaten. A secret jirga (council) of Pashtun chiefs was held to discuss this violation of pashtunwali, where Ackakzai holding a Koran in one hand stated: "Now we are justified in throwing this English yoke; they stretch the hand of tyranny to dishonor private citizens great and small: fucking a slave girl isn't worth the ritual bath that follows it: but we have to put a stop right here and now, otherwise these English will ride the donkey of their desires into the field of stupidity, to the point of having all of us arrested and deported to a foreign field". At the end of his speech, all of the chiefs shouted "Jihad". November 2, 1841 actually fell on 17 Ramadan which was the anniversary date for the battle of Badr. The Afghans decided to strike on this date for reasons of the blessings associated with this auspicious date of 17 Ramadan. The call to jihad was given on the morning of 2 November from the Pul-i-khisti mosque in Kabul

Lady Sale wrote in her diary on 2 November 1841: "This morning early, all was in commotion in Kabul. The shops were plundered and the people all fighting." That same day, a mob "thirsting for blood" appeared outside of the house of the East India Company's second political officer, Sir Alexander 'Sekundar' Burnes, where Burnes ordered his sepoy guards not to fire while he stood outside haranguing the mob in Pashto, attempting unconvincingly to persuade the assembled men that he did not bed their daughters and sisters. Captain William Broadfoot who was with Burnes saw the mob march forward, leading him to open fire with another officer writing in his diary that he "killed five or six men with his own hand before he was shot down". The mob smashed in to Burnes's house, where he, his brother Charles, their wives and children, several aides and the sepoys were all torn to pieces. The mob then attacked the home of the paymaster Johnston who was not present, leading to later write when he surveyed the remains of his house that they "gained possession of my treasury by undermining the wall...They murdered the whole of the guard (one officer and 28 sepoys), all my servants (male, female, and children), plundered the treasury...burnt all my office records...and possessed themselves of all my private property". The British forces took no action in response despite being only five minutes away, which encouraged further revolt. The only person who took action that day was Shuja who ordered out one of his regiments from the Bala Hissar commanded by a Scots mercenary named Campbell to crush the riot, but the old city of Kabul with its narrow, twisting streets favored the defenders, with Campbell's men coming under fire from rebels in the houses above. After losing about 200 men killed, Campbell retreated back to the Bala Hissar. After hearing of the defeat of his regiment, Shuja descended into what Kaye called "a pitiable state of dejection and alarm", sinking into a deep state of depression as it finally dawned on him that his people hated him and wanted to see him dead. Captain Sturt was sent to the Bala Hissar by Elphinstone to see if it were possible to recover control of the city later that afternoon, where his mother-in-law Lady Sale noted in her diary: "Just as he entered the precincts of the palace, he was stabbed in three places by a young man well dressed, who escaped into a building close-by, where he was protected by the gates being shut." Sturt was sent home to be cared for by Lady Sale and his wife with the former noting: "He was covered with blood issuing from his mouth and was unable to articulate. He could not lie down, from the blood choking him", only being capable hours later to utter one word: "bet-ter". Lady Sale was highly critical of Elphinstone's leadership, writing: "General Elphinstone vacillates on every point. His own judgement appears to be good, but he is swayed by the last speaker", criticising him for "...a very strange circumstance that troops were not immediately sent into the city to quell the affair in the commencement, but we seem to sit quietly with our hands folded, and look on".." Despite both being in the cantonment, Elphinstone preferred to write letters to Macnaghten, with one letter on 2 November saying "I have been considering what can done tomorrow" (he decided to do nothing that day), stating "our dilemma is a difficult one", and finally concluding "We must see what the morning brings". The British situation soon deteriorated when Afghans stormed the poorly defended supply fort inside Kabul on 9 November.

In the following weeks, the British commanders tried to negotiate with Akbar Khan. Macnaghten secretly offered to make Akbar Afghanistan's vizier in exchange for allowing the British to stay, while simultaneously disbursing large sums of money to have him assassinated, which was reported to Akbar Khan. A meeting for direct negotiations between Macnaghten and Akbar was held near the cantonment on 23 December, but Macnaghten and the three officers accompanying him were seized and slain by Akbar Khan. Macnaghten's body was dragged through the streets of Kabul and displayed in the bazaar. Elphinstone had partly lost command of his troops already and his authority was badly damaged.

=== Destruction of Elphinstone's army ===
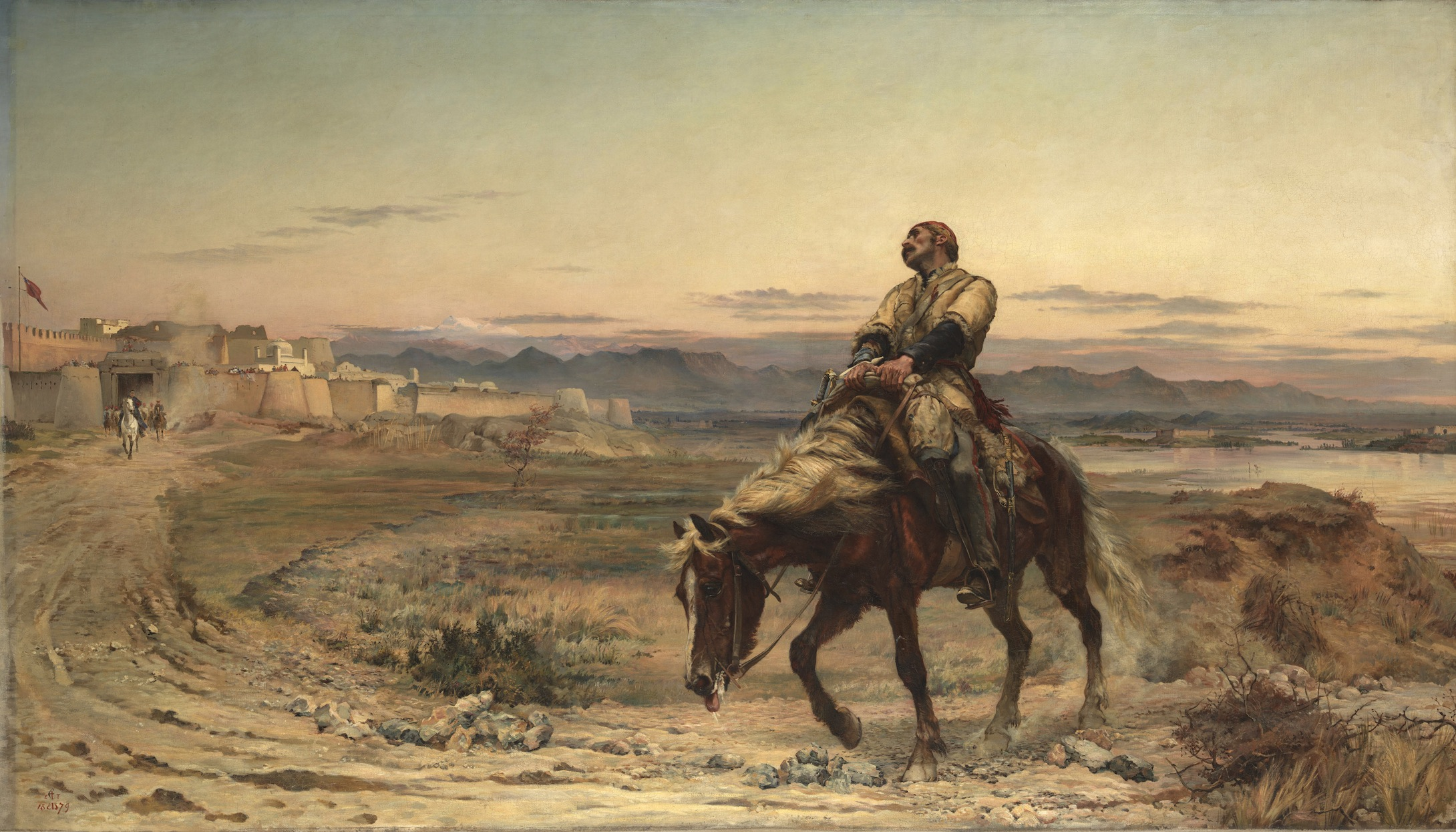
Remnants of an Army by Elizabeth Butler depicting the arrival of assistant surgeon, William Brydon, at Jalalabad on 13 January 1842

On 1 January 1842, following some unusual thinking by Major-General William George Keith Elphinstone, which may have had something to do with the poor defensibility of the cantonment, an agreement was reached that provided for the safe exodus of the British garrison and its dependents from Afghanistan. Five days later, the withdrawal began. The departing British contingent numbered around 16,500, of which about 4,500 were military personnel, and over 12,000 were camp followers. Lieutenant Vincent Eyre commented about the camp followers that "These proved from the very first mile a serious clog on our movements". Lady Sale brought with her 40 servants, none of whom she named in her diary while Eyre's son was saved by a female Afghan servant, who rode through an ambush with the boy on her back, but he never gave her name. The American author James M. Perry noted: "Reading the old diaries and journals, it is almost as if these twelve thousand native servants and sepoy wives and children didn't exist individually. In a way, they really didn't. They would die, all of them - shot, stabbed, frozen to death - in these mountain passes, and no one bothered to write down the name of even one of them". The military force consisted mostly of Indian units and one British battalion, 44th Regiment of Foot.

They were attacked by Ghilzai warriors as they struggled through the snowbound passes. On the first day, the retreating force made only five miles and as Lady Sale wrote about their arrival at a village of Begramee: "There were no tents, save two or three small palls that arrived. Everyone scraped away the snow as best they might, to make a place to lie down. The evening and night were intensely cold; no food for man or beast procurable, except a few handfuls of bhoosay [chopped stew], for which we had to pay five to ten rupees". As the night fell and with it, the temperature, dropped well below freezing. The retreating force then learned that they lost all of their supplies of food and their baggage. On the second day all of the men of the Royal Afghan Army's 6th regiment deserted, heading back to Kabul, marking the end of the first attempt to give Afghanistan a national army. For several months afterwards, what had once been Shuja's army was reduced to begging on the streets of Kabul as Akbar had of all of Shuja's mercenaries mutilated before throwing them on the streets to beg. Despite Akbar Khan's promise of safe conduct, the Anglo-Indian force was repeatedly attacked by the Ghilzais, with one especially fierce Afghan attack being beaten off with a spirited bayonet charge by the 44th Foot.

While trying to cross the Koord-Kabual pass in the Hindu Kush that was described as five miles long and "so narrow and so shut in on either side that the wintry sun rarely penetrates its gloomy recesses", the Anglo-Indian force was ambushed by the Ghilzai tribesmen. Johnson described "murderous fire" that forced the British to abandon all baggage while camp followers regardless of sex and age were cut down with swords. Lady Sale wrote: "Bullets kept whizzing by us" while some of the artillerymen smashed open the regimental store of brandy to get drunk amid the Afghan attacks. Lady Sale wrote she drank a tumbler of sherry "which at any other time would have made me very unlady-like, but now merely warmed me." Lady Sale took a bullet in her wrist while she had to watch as her son-in-law Sturt had "...his horse was shot out from him and before he could rise from the ground he received a severe wound in the abdomen". With his wife and mother-in-law by his side in the snow, Sturt bled to death over the course of the night. The incompetent, naive and gullible Elphinstone continued to believe that Akbar Khan was his "ally", and believed his promise that he would send out the captured supplies if he stopped the retreat on 8 January. Adding to the misery of the British, that night a ferocious blizzard blew in, causing hundreds to freeze to death.

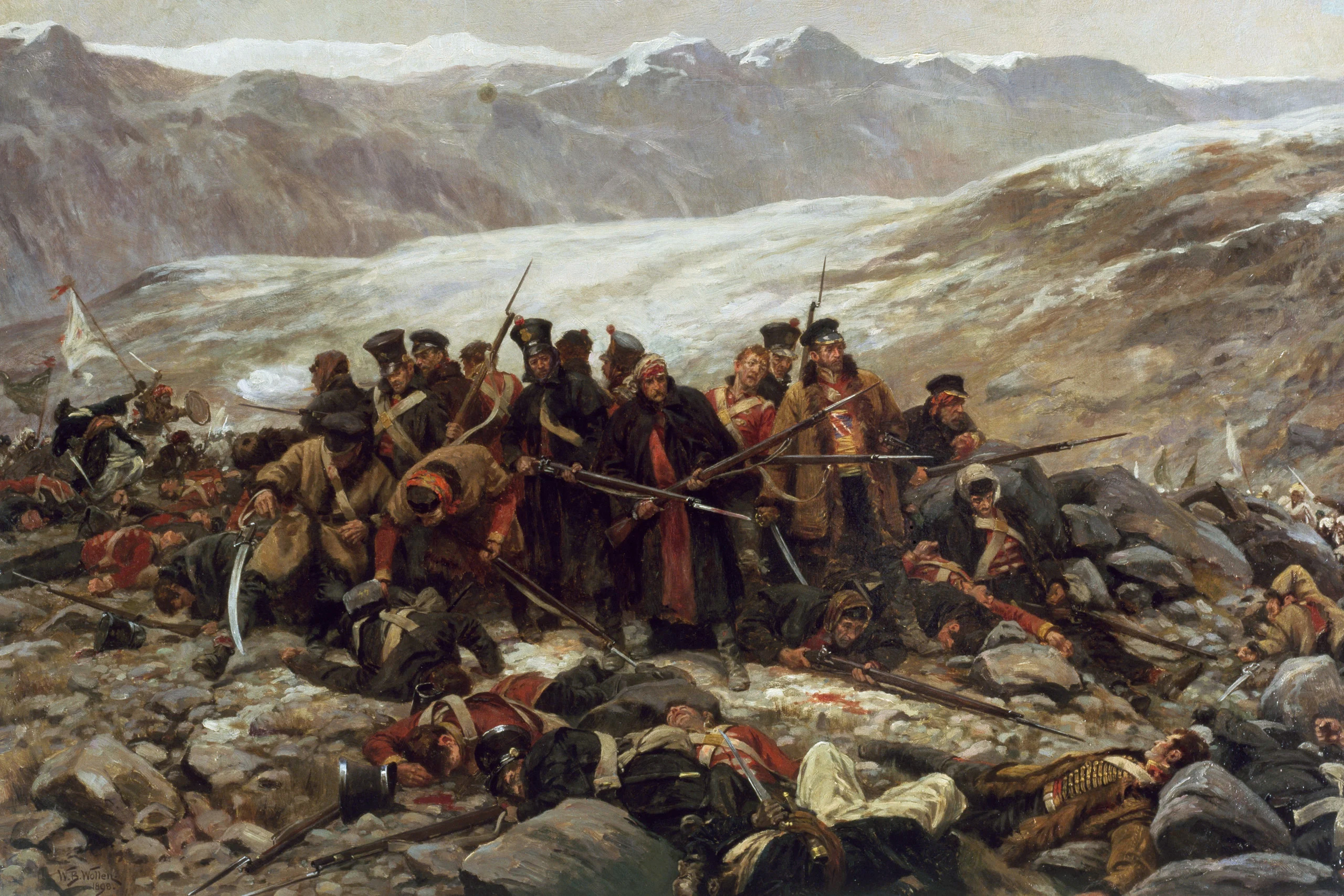
The Last Stand of the 44th Regiment at Gundamuck by William Barnes Wollen, 1898

On 9 January 1842, Akbar sent out a messenger saying he was willing to take all of the British women as hostages, giving his word that they would not be harmed, and said that otherwise his tribesmen would show no mercy and kill all the women and children. One of the British officers sent to negotiate with Akbar heard him say to his tribesmen in Dari (Afghan Farsi) – a language spoken by many British officers – to "spare" the British while saying in Pashto, which most British officers did not speak, to "slay them all". Lady Sale, her pregnant daughter Alexandria and the rest of British women and children accepted Akbar's offer of safe conduct back to Kabul. As the East India Company would not pay a ransom for Indian women and children, Akbar refused to accept them, and so the Indian women and children died with the rest of the force in the Hindu Kush. The camp followers captured by the Afghans were stripped of all their clothing and left to freeze to death in the snow. Lady Sale wrote that as she was taken back to Kabul she noticed: "The road was covered with awful mangled bodies, all naked".

In the early morning of 10 January, the column resumed its march, with everyone tired, hungry, and cold. Most of the sepoys by this time had lost a finger or two to frostbite, and could not fire their guns. At the narrow pass of Tunghee Tareekee, which was 50 yards long, and only 4 yards wide, the Ghizye tribesmen ambushed the column, killing without mercy all of the camp followers. The Anglo-Indian soldiers fought their way over the corpses of the camp followers with heavy losses to themselves. From a hill, Akbar Khan and his chiefs watched the slaughter while sitting on their horses, being apparently very much amused by the carnage. Captain Shelton and a few soldiers from the 44th regiment held the rear of the column and fought off successive Afghan attacks, despite being outnumbered. Johnson described Shelton as fighting like a "bulldog" with his sword, cutting down any Afghan who tried to take him on so efficiently that by the end of the day no Afghan would challenge him. On the evening of 11 January 1842, General Elphinstone, Captain Shelton, the paymaster Johnston, and Captain Skinner met with Akbar Khan to ask him to stop his attacks on the column. Akbar Khan provided them with warm tea and a fine meal before telling them that they were all now his hostages as he reckoned the East India Company would pay good ransoms for their freedom, and when Captain Skinner tried to resist, he was shot in the face. Command now fell to Brigadier Thomas Anquetil.

The evacuees were killed in huge numbers as they made their way down the 30 miles (48 km) of treacherous gorges and passes lying along the Kabul River between Kabul and Gandamak, and were massacred at the Gandamak pass before a survivor reached the besieged garrison at Jalalabad. At Gandamak, some 20 officers and 45 other ranks of the 44th Foot regiment, together with some artillerymen and sepoys, armed with some 20 muskets and two rounds of ammunition to every man, found themselves at dawn surrounded by Afghan tribesmen. The force had been reduced to fewer than forty men by a withdrawal from Kabul that had become, towards the end, a running battle through two feet of snow. The ground was frozen, the men had no shelter and had little food for weeks. Of the weapons remaining to the survivors at Gandamak, there were approximately a dozen working muskets, the officers' pistols, and a few swords. The British formed a square and defeated the first couple of the Afghan attacks, "driving the Afghans several times down the hill" before running out of ammunition. They then fought on with their bayonets and swords before being overwhelmed. The Afghans took only 9 prisoners and killed the rest. The remnants of the 44th were all killed except Captain James Souter, Sergeant Fair, and seven soldiers who were taken prisoner. The only soldier to reach Jalalabad was Dr. William Brydon and several sepoys over the following nights. Another source states that over one hundred British were taken prisoner. One British NCO fled from Gandamak to Gujrat India on foot according to a source cited from The Times of 2 March 1843 by Farrukh Husain who writes: "The oddest account of escape from Gundamuck concerns that of a dark-skinned faqir who appeared in India in rags but was in fact a Scottish non commissioned officer who fled all the way to a British army Camp Deesa in Gujrat India, "This morning a strange man came into camp, covered with hair, and almost naked his face burnt very much; he turned out to be Lance-Sergeant Philip Edwards of the Queen's 44th Regiment who escaped the general slaughter at Gundamuch, Afghanistan, and after travelling 15 months in a southerly direction by the sun, he found his way into camp here, not knowing where he was.""

Many of the women and children were taken captive by the Afghan warring tribes; some of these women married their captors, mostly Afghan and Indian camp followers who were wives of British officers. Children taken from the battlefield at the time who were later identified in the early part of the 20th century to be those of the fallen soldiers were brought up by Afghan families as their own children.

=== Second British expedition ===
At the same time as the attacks on the garrison at Kabul, Afghan forces beleaguered the other British contingents in Afghanistan. These were at Kandahar (where the largest British force in the country had been stationed), Jalalabad (held by a force which had been sent from Kabul in October 1841 as the first stage of a planned withdrawal) and Ghazni. Ghazni was stormed, but the other garrisons held out until relief forces arrived from India, in spring 1842. Akbar Khan was defeated near Jalalabad and plans were laid for the recapture of Kabul and the restoration of British control.

However, Lord Auckland had suffered a stroke and had been replaced as governor-general by Lord Ellenborough, who was under instructions to bring the war to an end following a change of government in Britain. Ellenborough ordered the forces at Kandahar and Jalalabad to leave Afghanistan after inflicting reprisals and securing the release of prisoners taken during the retreat from Kabul.

In August 1842 General William Nott advanced from Kandahar, capturing Ghazni and partially demolishing the city's fortifications. Meanwhile, General George Pollock, who had taken command of a demoralized force in Peshawar used it to clear the Khyber Pass to arrive at Jalalabad, where General Sale had already lifted the siege. From Jalalabad, General Pollock inflicted a further crushing defeat on Akbar Khan. As the expedition advanced through Afghanistan, they bore witness to the countless dead comrades who perished following the retreat from Kabul. This enraged the British who took revenge on Afghan civilians by razing villages, murdering men and raping women. Neville Bowles Chamberlain described the killings as "truly wicked." The combined British forces defeated all opposition before taking Kabul in September. A month later, having rescued the prisoners and demolished the city's main bazaar as an act of revenge for the destruction of Elphinstone's column, they withdrew from Afghanistan through the Khyber Pass. Dost Muhammad was released and re-established his authority in Kabul. He died on 9 June 1863. During his lifetime no Russian mission was established in Afghanistan. Dost Mohammad is reported to have said:

I have been struck by the magnitude of your resources, your ships, your arsenals, but what I cannot understand is why the rulers of so vast and flourishing an empire should have gone across the Indus to deprive me of my poor and barren country.

== Aftermath ==
Many voices in Britain, from Lord Aberdeen to Benjamin Disraeli, had criticized the war as rash and insensate. The perceived threat from Russia was vastly exaggerated, given the distances, the almost impassable mountain barriers, and logistical problems that an invasion would have to solve. In the three decades after the First Anglo-Afghan War, the Russians did advance steadily southward towards Afghanistan. In 1842, the Russian border was on the other side of the Aral Sea from Afghanistan. By 1865 Tashkent had been formally annexed, as was Samarkand three years later. A peace treaty in 1873 with Amir Alim Khan of the Manghit Dynasty, the ruler of Bukhara, virtually stripped him of his independence. Russian control then extended as far as the northern bank of the Amu Darya. The war would also be renowned as the "greatest military humiliation of the nineteenth century" for the British.

In 1878, the British invaded again, beginning the Second Anglo-Afghan War.

Lady Butler's famous painting of Dr. William Brydon, initially thought to be the sole survivor, gasping his way to the British outpost in Jalalabad, helped make Afghanistan's reputation as a graveyard for foreign armies and became one of the great epics of empire.

In 1843, the British army chaplain, G.R. Gleig, wrote a memoir of the disastrous First Anglo-Afghan War, describing it as:

a war begun for no wise purpose, carried on with a strange mixture of rashness and timidity, brought to a close after suffering and disaster, without much glory attached either to the government which directed, or the great body of troops which waged it. Not one benefit, political or military, was acquired with this war. Our eventual evacuation of the country resembled the retreat of an army defeated.

The Church of St. John the Evangelist located in Navy Nagar, Mumbai, India, more commonly known as the Afghan Church, was dedicated in 1852 as a memorial to the dead of the conflict.

== Financial cost of the war ==
During the fiscal year of 1840—1841, the campaign in Afghanistan had cost over 1 million British pounds. Furthermore, half a million pounds were used towards the upkeep of garrisons in Sindh. The upkeep cost the Indian government heavily, drawing them into a deficit of over a million pounds, to which the government was borrowing loans heavily. This became increasingly unsustainable, and as a result, British forces in Afghanistan were ordered to be reduced to all but two regiments, with one being in stationed Kabul, and the other in Kandahar. Auckland intended to withdraw most troops by the next year, also informing Macnaghten that by 1842, spending had to be cut from 1 million pounds, to just 30,000.

== Battle honour ==
The battle honour of 'Afghanistan 1839' was awarded to all units of the presidency armies of the East India Company that had proceeded beyond the Bolan Pass, by gazette of the governor-general, dated 19 November 1839, the spelling changed from 'Afghanistan' to 'Affghanistan' by Gazette of India No. 1079 of 1916, and the date added in 1914. All the honours awarded for this war are considered to be non-repugnant. The units awarded this battle honour were:

- 4th Bengal Irregular Cavalry – 1st Horse
- 5th Madras Infantry
- Poona Auxiliary Horse – Poona Horse
- Bombay Sappers & Miners – Bombay Engineer Group
- 31st Bengal Infantry
- 43rd Bengal Infantry
- 19th Bombay Infantry
- 1st Bombay Cavalry – 13th Lancers
- 2nd, 3rd Bengal Light Cavalry – mutinied in 1857
- 2nd, 3rd Companies of Bengal Sappers and Miners – mutinied in 1857
- 16th, 35th, 37th, 48th Bengal Infantry – mutinied in 1857
- 42nd Bengal Infantry (5th LI) – disbanded 1922

== Fictional depictions ==
- It was depicted in an 1842 panorama in London. The exhibition was advertised as: "a comprehensive and interesting VIEW OF CABUL, including every object of interest in the city, the Bala Hissar, the river Cabul, with a distant view of the Himalaya Mountains and the Pass of Khurd Cabul, where the British army were so treacherously destroyed. The whole illustrated by numerous groups of figures descriptive of the manngers of the Afghanese."
- The First Anglo-Afghan war is depicted in a work of historical fiction, Flashman by George MacDonald Fraser. (This is Fraser's first Flashman novel.)
- The ordeal of Dr. Brydon may have inspired the story of Dr. John Watson in Conan Doyle's first Sherlock Holmes novel A Study in Scarlet, although his wound was suffered in the second war.
- Emma Drummond's novel Beyond all Frontiers (1983) is based on these events, as are Philip Hensher's Mulberry Empire (2002) and Fanfare (1993), by Andrew MacAllan, a distant relation of Dr William Brydon.
- G.A. Henty's children's novel To Herat and Kabul focuses on the Anglo-Afghan War through the perspective of a Scottish expatriate teenager named Angus. Theodor Fontane's poem, Das Trauerspiel von Afghanistan (The Tragedy of Afghanistan) also refers to the massacre of Elphinstone's army.
- Victoria (2017) episode "A Soldier's Daughter" dramatizes Brydon's survival in the retreat. In the show, Queen Victoria responds to the loss of life in the retreat with a speech at the launch of HMS Trafalgar, and by privately meeting and honouring Brydon.

== See also ==
- Second Anglo-Afghan War
- Third Anglo-Afghan War
- Invasions of Afghanistan
- Waziristan campaign (1919–1920)
- Waziristan campaign (1921–1924)
- Waziristan campaign (1936–1939)
- Pink's War
- Waziristan rebellion (1948-1954)
- Military history of Afghanistan
- Chapslee Estate
- European influence in Afghanistan
- Military history of Britain
- War artist James Rattray
