= Remnants of an Army =

1879 painting by Elizabeth Thompson

The remnants of an Army, Jellalabad, January 13, 1842
- Remnants of an Army
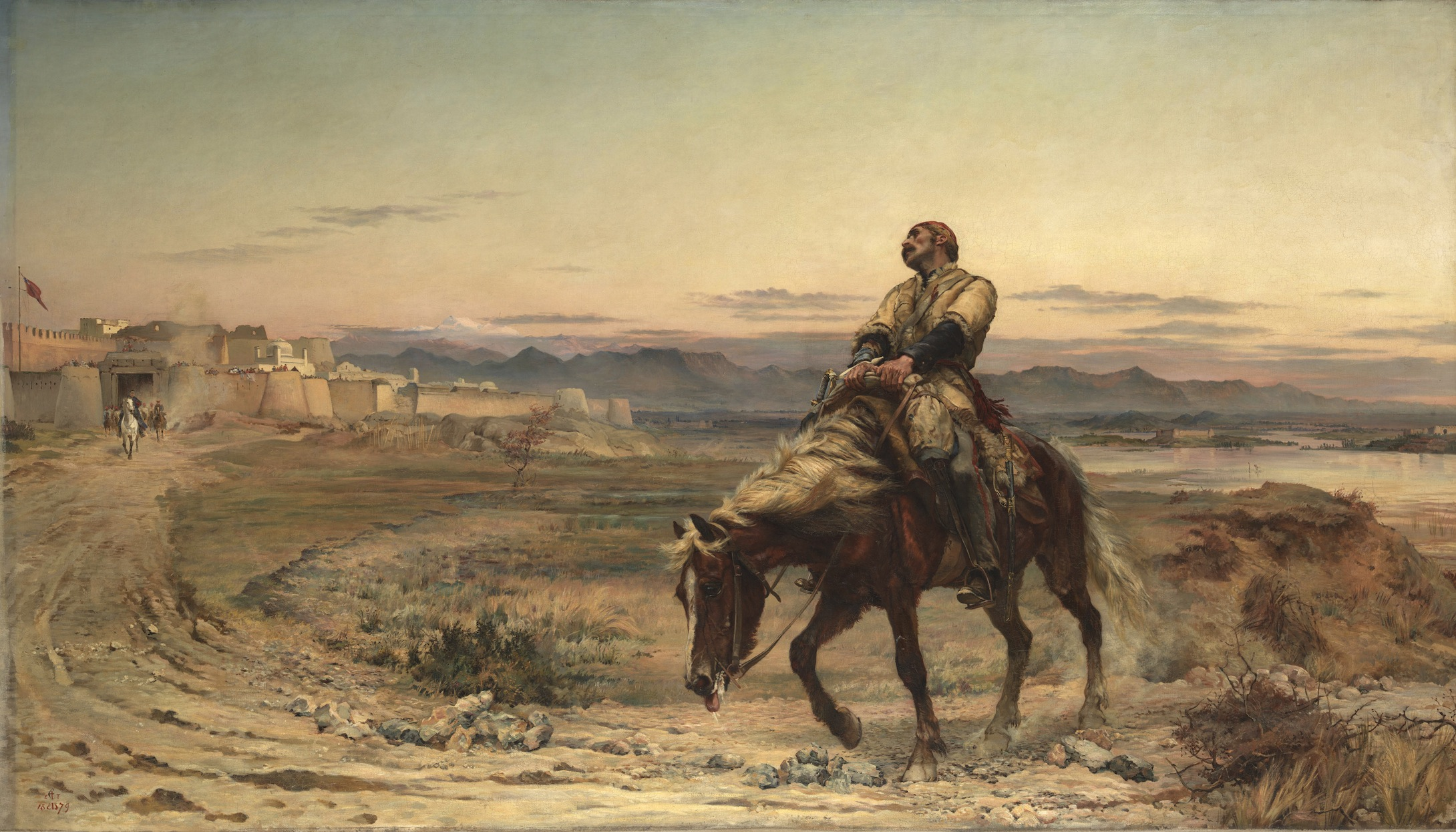
- Remnants of an Army.
- Artist: Elizabeth Thompson
- Year: 1879
- Medium: Oil on canvas
- Movement: Military art
- Subject: William Brydon
- Dimensions: 132.1 cm × 233.7 cm (52.0 in × 92.0 in)
- Location: Tate Britain, London

The Remnants of an Army, Jellalabad, January 13, 1842, better known as Remnants of an Army, is an oil-on-canvas painting by Elizabeth Thompson, Lady Butler, from 1879. It depicts William Brydon, assistant surgeon in the Bengal Army, arriving at the gates of Jalalabad in January 1842. The walls of Jalalabad loom over a desolate plain and riders from the garrison gallop from the gate to reach the solitary figure bringing the first word of the fate of the "Army of Afghanistan".

Supposedly Brydon was initially thought to be the only survivor of the approximately 16,000 soldiers and camp followers from the 1842 retreat from Kabul in the First Anglo-Afghan War, and is shown toiling the last few miles to safety on an exhausted and dying horse. A few other stragglers from the army arrived later, and larger numbers were eventually released or rescued after spending time as captives of Afghan forces.

The painting was made during the Second Anglo-Afghan War. Lady Butler was developing a reputation for her military pictures after the favourable reception of her earlier painting The Roll Call of 1874, on a subject from the Crimean War. It measures 132.1 centimetres (52.0 in) by 233.7 centimetres (92.0 in)

Remnants of an Army was exhibited at the Royal Academy summer exhibition in 1879, and acquired by Sir Henry Tate, who presented it to the Tate Gallery in 1897. Still owned by the Tate Gallery, it was on long-term loan as part of a permanent exhibition at the Somerset Military Museum: the 13th (1st Somersetshire) Regiment (Light Infantry) was involved in the First Anglo-Afghan War, and moved to Jalalabad in late 1841. In 2023 it was rehung at Tate Britain.

== See also ==
- The Last Stand of the 44th Regiment at Gundamuck, an 1898 painting by William Barnes Wollen
