= Gandamak =

Village in Nangarhar Province, Afghanistan

Coordinates: 34.2892°N 70.0383°E

Gandamak (Pashto: ګندمک) is a village of Afghanistan located between Kabul and Jalalabad, 35 miles (56 km) from Jalalabad on the old road to Kabul.

== History ==
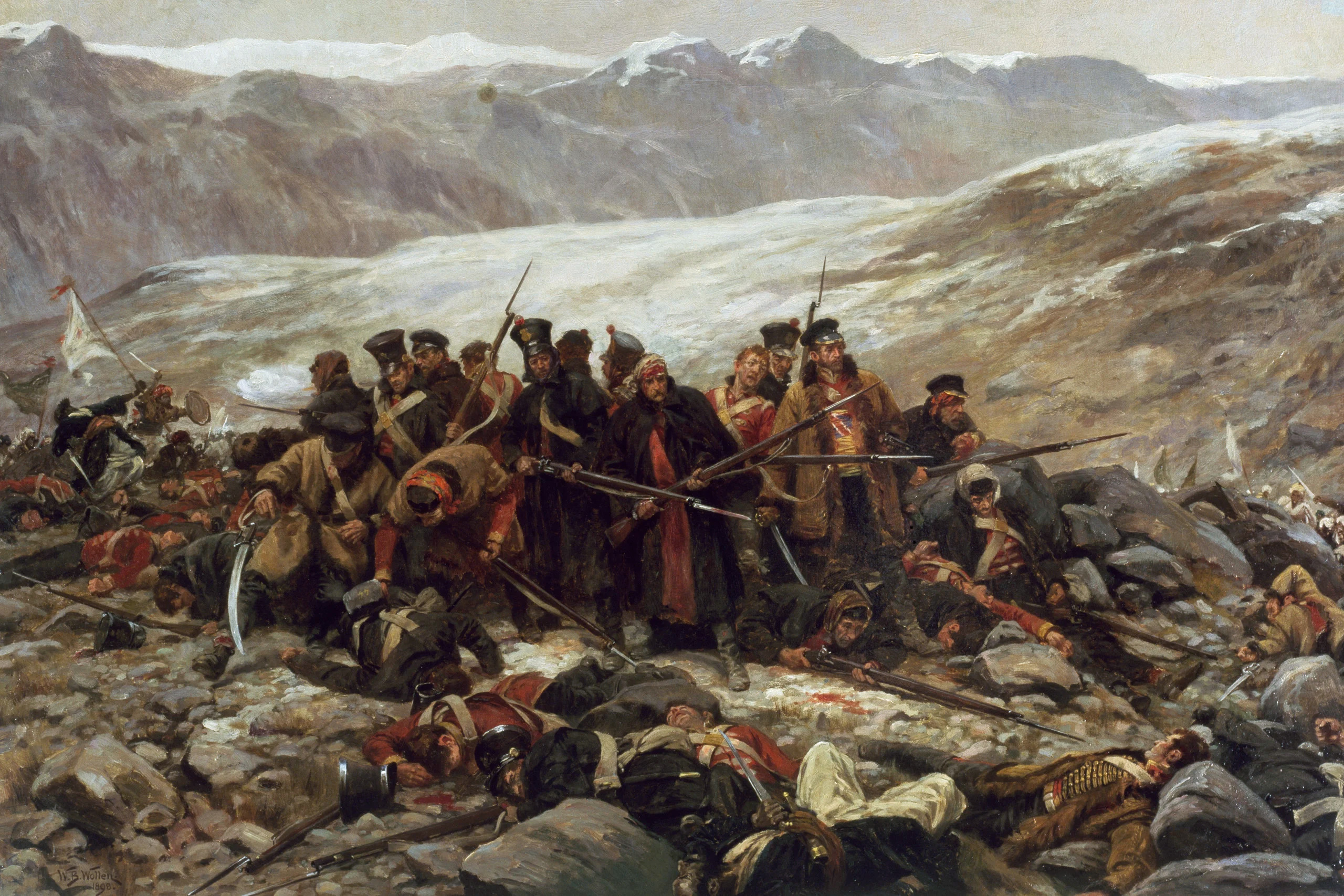
The Last Stand of the 44th Regiment at Gundamuck, by William Barnes Wollen (1898)

During the retreat from Kabul of General Elphinstone's army in 1842, a hill near Gandamak was the scene of the Battle of Gandamak, during which the last survivors of the force—twenty officers and forty-five British soldiers of the 44th East Essex Regiment—were killed, leaving only one survivor, an assistant surgeon named William Brydon.

Gandamak is also known for the Treaty of Gandamak, which was signed here on 26 May 1879, between His Highness Muhammad Yakub Khan, Amir of Afghanistan and its dependencies and Sir Louis Cavagnari of the British government's India Office, which marked the end of the first portion of the Second Anglo-Afghan War.

== See also ==
- Nangarhar Province
