= The Last Stand of the 44th Regiment at Gundamuck =

Painting by William Barnes Wollen

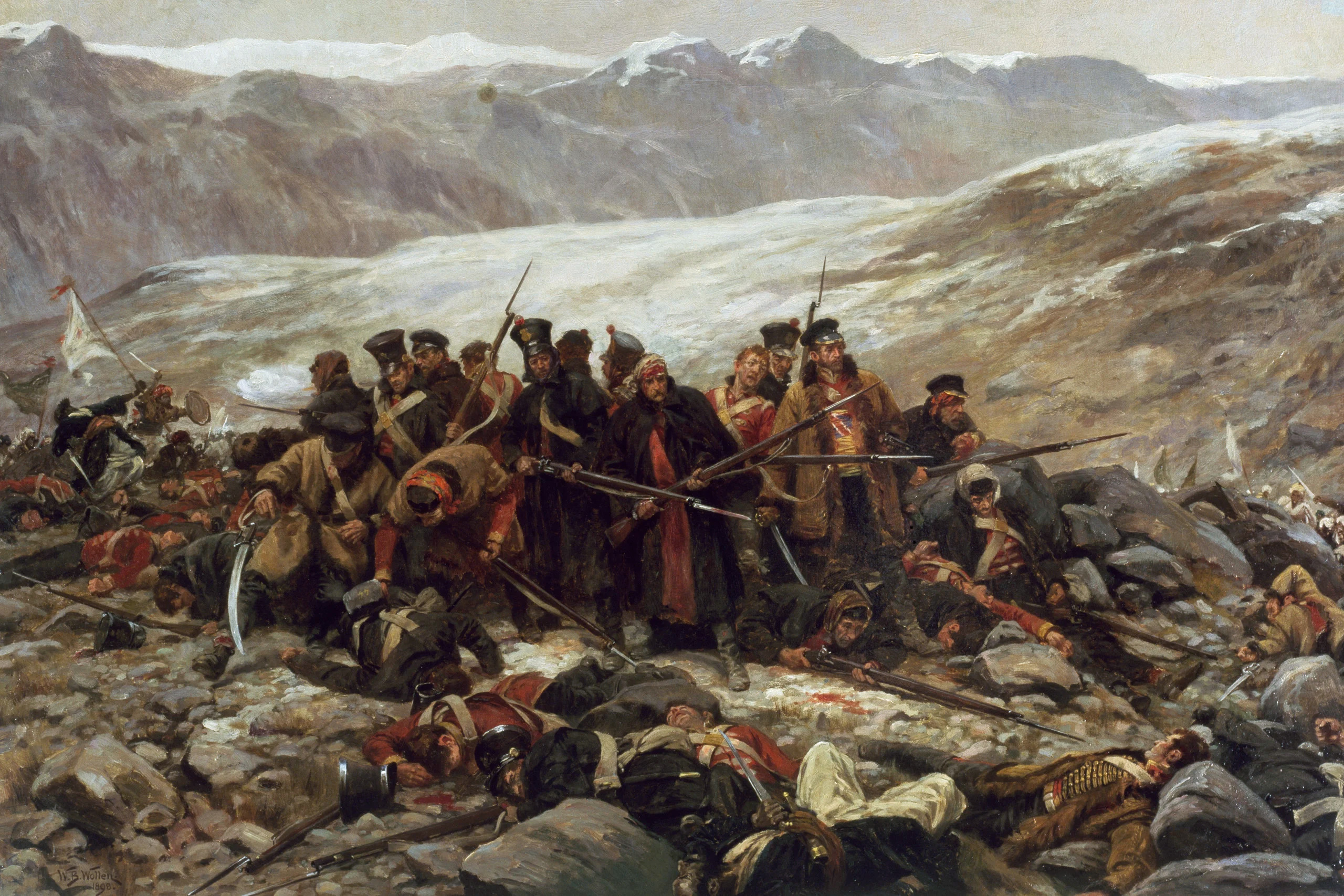
- Artist: William Barnes Wollen
- Year: 1898
- Type: Oil on canvas, history painting
- Dimensions: 75.9 cm × 122 cm (29.9 in × 48 in)
- Location: Museum of Chelmsford; Essex

The Last Stand of the 44th Regiment at Gundamuck is an 1898 history painting by the British artist William Barnes Wollen. It depicts the dramatic last stand of British troops at the Battle of Gandamak during the Retreat from Kabul during the First Anglo-Afghan War. Fought on 13 January 1842 the vastly outnumbered detachment of the 44th Foot (East Essex Regiment) made a desperate, failed attempt to hold off the enemy as Afghan forces closed in. One of the officers, Thomas Alexander Souter, has wrapped the regimental colours around his chest.

Wollen was known for his scenes of British military history. It was part of a trend to portray the disastrous campaign into a display of British heroism. The painting was subsequently purchased by the officers of the Essex Regiment, the successor unit. It was later transferred to the Museum of Chelmsford.

== See also ==
- Remnants of an Army, an 1879 painting by Elizabeth Thompson, Lady Butler featuring the same campaign

== Bibliography ==
- Kestner, Joseph A. Masculinities in Victorian Painting. Scolar Press, 1985.
- Lee, Jonathan L. Afghanistan: A History from 1260 to the Present. Reaktion Books, 2022.
- Royle, Trevor. Britain's Lost Regiments. Aurum, 2014.
- Usherwood, Paul & Spencer-Smith, Jenny. Lady Butler, Battle Artist, 1846-1933. Sutton, 1987.
