= Action at Hykulzye =

Military engagement between Afghans and the British

- Part of the First Anglo-Afghan War, 1839–1842
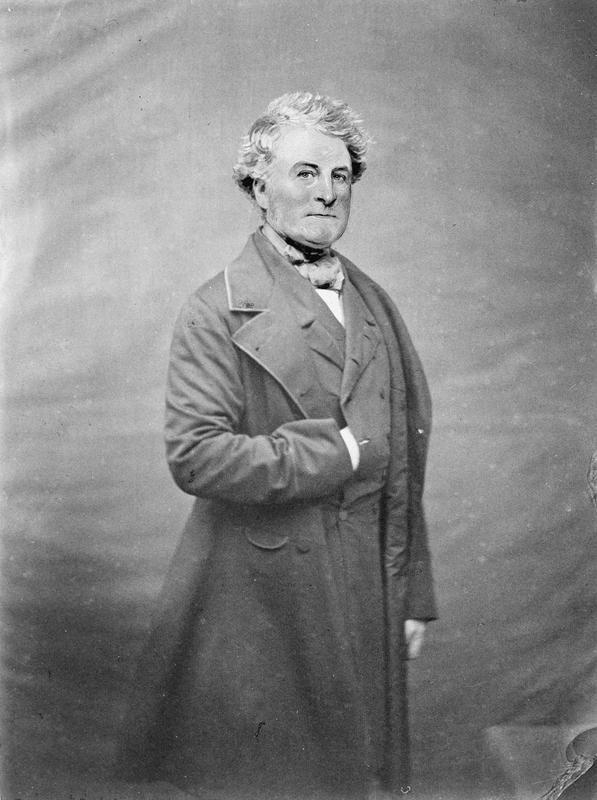
- General Sir Richard England
Date	28 March 1842
Location	Hykulzye, Pishin, Pakistan
Result	Afghan victory

Belligerents
Afghan insurgents	United Kingdom

Commanders and leaders
Muhammad Sadiq	Brigadier-General Richard England

Strength
Unknown but more than British	1,070 men (only 470 engaged)

Casualties and losses
30 killed 50 wounded	27 killed 71 wounded

The Action at Hykulzye was an engagement between Afghan insurgents and British troops led by Brigadier-General Richard England at the village of Hykulzye. The Afghans were victorious and the British were repulsed.

== Background ==
On receiving the news of the uprising of Afghans in Kabul in November 1841, General William Nott took energetic measures. On 23 December 1841 the British envoy, Sir William Hay Macnaghten, was murdered at Kabul, and in February 1842 the commander-in-chief, General Elphinstone, sent orders that Kandahar was to be evacuated. Nott disobeyed, supposing that Elphinstone was not a free agent in Kabul; and as soon as he heard the news of the massacre of Elphinstone's army, he urged the government at Calcutta to maintain the garrison of Kandahar.

== Battle ==
Political officers in Sindh decided to reinforce General Nott at Kandahar. The troops made their way to Quetta under Brigadier-General Richard England. Nott retained his position and did not send reinforcements to catch up with England's detachment, which arrived at Hykulzye on 28 March, knowing nothing about the territory. Colonel Stacy informed him that he might meet the Afghans south of Kandahar. Muhammad Sadiq positioned himself on the heights and awaited the British to offer a fight. The British had a force of 1070, but only 470 engaged.

The British attacked, but due to the high hills and the Afghans' numeric superiority, the British were repulsed. They retreated down the hill and reached the plain. The British then formed a square and resisted the Afghans who withdrew to their hills.

The British lost 27, with 71 wounded, while the Afghans lost 30 with 50 wounded. The British attempted to attack again, but Richard decided to retreat and fell back to Quetta.
