= John Shelton (British Army officer) =

British army officer (1790/91–1845)

- Born: 1790/91
- Died: 13 May 1845 (aged 54); Dublin, Ireland
- Burial place: St Peter's Church, Dublin, Ireland
- Military career
- Allegiance: United Kingdom
- Branch: British Army
- Service years: 1805–1845
- Rank: Brigadier General
- Units: 9th (East Norfolk) Regiment of Foot; 44th (East Essex) Regiment of Foot
- Wars: Napoleonic Wars; Walcheren Campaign; Peninsular War; Battle of Rolica; Battle of Vimeiro; Battle of Corunna; Battle of Salamanca; Battle of Villa Muriel; Battle of San Millan-Osma; Battle of Vitoria; Siege of San Sebastian (WIA); Battle of Bayonne; War of 1812; First Anglo-Burmese War; First Anglo-Afghan War; 1842 retreat from Kabul (POW)

Brigadier General John Shelton (1790/91 – 13 May 1845) was an officer of the British Army who commanded the 44th (East Essex) Regiment of Foot during the First Anglo-Afghan War and was second-in-command to Major General Sir William Elphinstone. He was one of only a small number of British soldiers to survive the disastrous 1842 retreat from Kabul, in which a British army column of 4,500 men and 12,000 civilians was massacred by Afghan tribesmen as it attempted to march to Jalalabad while partially disarmed. He was widely disliked as a tyrannical and ineffective commander whose failures led to the annihilation of his regiment and whose accidental death was cheered by his men, but he also had a deserved reputation for great physical bravery.

== Early career ==
Shelton was commissioned into the army as an ensign in the 9th (East Norfolk) Regiment of Foot on 21 November 1805. Two years later he became a lieutenant. In 1808 he saw action at the battles of Roliça, Vimiero and Corunna in Portugal. The regiment was subsequently recalled to Britain. Shelton took part in the disastrous Walcheren expedition of 1809 before returning to the Iberian Peninsula in 1812–13. During those years he participated in the battles of Badajoz, Burgos, Salamanca and Vittoria before being severely wounded at the siege of San Sebastián, losing his right arm. It was said that he stood unmoved outside his tent while a surgeon amputated the limb.

In 1817 Shelton transferred to the 44th (East Essex) Regiment of Foot and was posted to India in 1822. The regiment fought at Arakan in Burma in March 1824 during the First Anglo-Burmese War, in which Shelton displayed conspicuous courage. A year later, on 6 February 1825, he became regimental major and was promoted to lieutenant-colonel on 16 September 1827. He acquired a reputation as a harsh and imperious commander over the next 13 years in India with the regiment.

== Service in Afghanistan ==
In late 1840 Shelton was temporarily promoted to the local rank of major general when his regiment was combined with two Indian units to create a relief for the British force in Afghanistan. During the first half of 1841 the brigade went first to Jalalabad before mounting a punitive expedition into the Nazian valley, opening the Khyber Pass to enable Shuja Shah Durrani's family to cross into India, and finally reached Kabul on 9 June.

Shelton soon made himself deeply unpopular with his colleagues and subordinates, only grudgingly attending meetings with the British commander in Afghanistan, Sir William Elphinstone, rarely replying to Elphinstone's queries and generally being disagreeable towards all comers. Elphinstone later wrote that Shelton's manner was "most contumacious from the day of his arrival. He never gave me information or advice, but invariably found fault with all that was done and canvassed and condemned all orders before officers – frequently perverting and delaying carrying them into effect. He appeared to be actuated by an ill-feeling towards me." He treated his men harshly and was seen as "a tyrant to his regiment".

Captain Colin Mackenzie observed Shelton's passage through Afghanistan and wrote that he was "a wretched brigadier. The monstrous confusion which takes place in crossing the rivers from his want of common arrangement is disgraceful, and would be fatal in an avowed enemy's country." When Mackenzie saw the brigade on a later occasion after its return from the Khyber Pass, he wrote, "As I expected, Shelton has marched the brigade off its legs ... The artillery horses are quite done up, those of the cavalry nearly so, and the beasts of burden, camels etc ... have died in great numbers, and will continue to die from over-work. The unnecessary hardship he has exposed the men to, especially during their passage through the Khyber, has caused much discontent. Part of the horse artillery on one occasion actually mutinied."

=== Uprising in Kabul ===
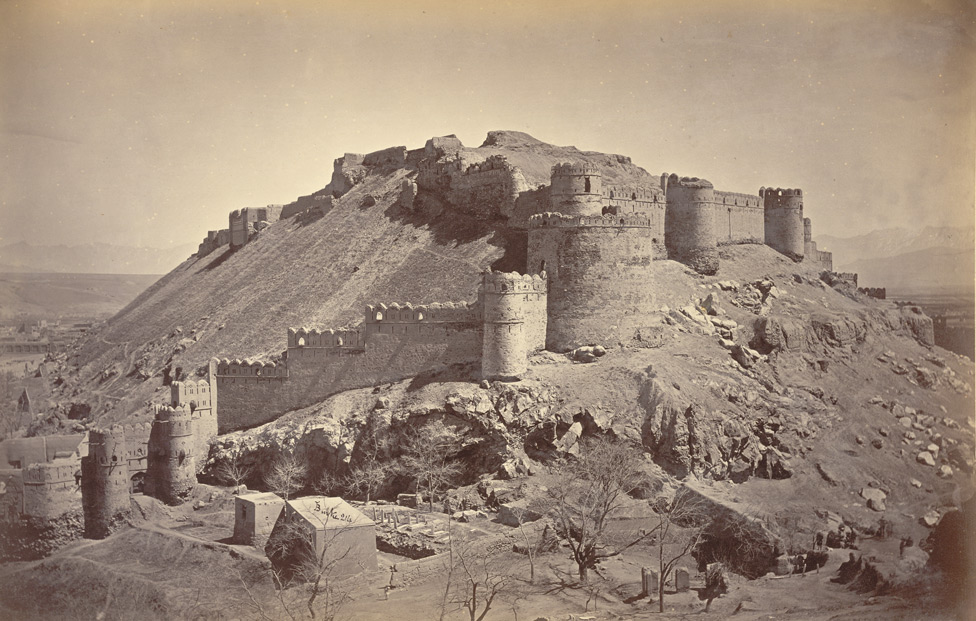
The Bala Hissar, Kabul, pictured in 1879

On 2 November 1841 an uprising broke out in Kabul which claimed the lives of the senior British officer Sir Alexander Burnes and his aides. Shelton was encamped two miles east of the city. He was ordered to occupy Kabul's citadel, the Bala Hissar, but displayed abject confusion on receiving the order. Captain George Lawrence wrote: "Brigadier Shelton's conduct at this crisis astonished me beyond expression ... [he] seemed almost beside himself, not knowing how to act, and with incapacity stamped on every feature of his face." Despite Shelton's misgivings, his troops reached the Bala Hissar unopposed and spent the next week there. Despite the strong fortifications of the citadel, he came to believe that he could not withstand a siege there and proposed that the British force should withdraw to Jalalabad, abandoning Kabul and the pro-British Shah Shuja.

Shelton's force evacuated the citadel and moved into a cantonment outside the city, though as he recognised, it was poorly fortified with a "rampart and ditch an Afghan could run over with the facility of a cat." He failed to take any action to defend another fort containing the British garrison's food supplies, despite having 5,000 men who could have been used for the task. The Kashmiri Mohan Lal, who had been Burnes's munshi or secretary, wrote later that Shelton "appeared from the commencement to despair of success, which produced a baneful effect in every fighting man."

The commissariat fort was duly lost and on 10 November Shelton led an attack on another fort, the Rikab Bashee, which the insurgents had also occupied. It took two rallies and cost over a hundred casualties before the 44th Foot took the fort. After the Afghans placed two artillery pieces on the Bimaru Hills half a mile north of the cantonment, Shelton led an attack to drive them out. It was initially successful but the hills were soon reoccupied.

=== Battle of the Bimaru Hills ===
Ten days later Shelton took his men out again to retake the hills. This second attack proved disastrous; the Afghans' long-barrelled jezails had a longer range than the British Brown Bess muskets and Shelton made no attempt to entrench his men to protect them from enemy fire. Instead he had the troops stand for hours in rows on the brow of the hill, fully exposed to enemy fire. They were systematically gunned down by Afghan snipers while Shelton refused to retreat. To make matters worse, Shelton adopted a formation that was wholly unsuited to the situation, as Lieutenant Vincent Eyre recalled:

All have heard of the British squares at Waterloo, which defied the repeated desperate onsets of Napoleon's choicest cavalry. At Beymaroo we formed squares to resist the distant fire of infantry, thus presenting a solid mass against the aim of perhaps the best marksmen in the world, the said squares being securely perched on the summit of a steep and narrow ridge, up which no cavalry could charge with effect ... Our cavalry, instead of being found upon the plain, where they might have been useful ... were hemmed in between two infantry squares, and exposed for several hours to a destructive fire from the enemy's jezails, on ground where, even under the most favourable circumstances, they could not have acted with effect.

Captain Colin Mackenzie, who took a bullet in the shoulder during the battle, wrote:

The front ranks had been literally mowed away ... Our ammunition was almost expended and by one pm the men were faint from fatigue and thirst. But no water was procurable and the number of killed and wounded was swelled every instant. I tried to persuade Shelton to effect a retreat only to be told: 'Oh no, we will hold the hill some time longer.' On Shelton's refusal to retire, Colonel Oliver, who was a very stout man, remarked that the inevitable result would be a general flight to cantonments, and that, as he was too unwieldy to run, the sooner he got shot the better. He then exposed himself to the enemy's fire and fell mortally wounded.

The battle turned, inevitably, into a rout. 300 of the 1,100 men on the hill were killed there while many more were cut off and killed one by one during the retreat to the cantonment. George St. Patrick Lawrence, who had watched helplessly from his post in the cantonment during the battle, wrote of his horror at witnessing how "our flying troops [were] hotly pursued and mixed up with the enemy, who were slaughtering them on all sides: the scene was so fearful that I can never forget it." He was bitterly critical of "the total incapacity of Brigadier Shelton, his reckless exposure of his men for hours at the top of a high ridge to a destructive fire, and his stubborn neglect to avail himself of the several opportunities offered to him throughout the day" which, in Lawrence's view, showed him to be "incapable to command."

=== Retreat and massacre ===
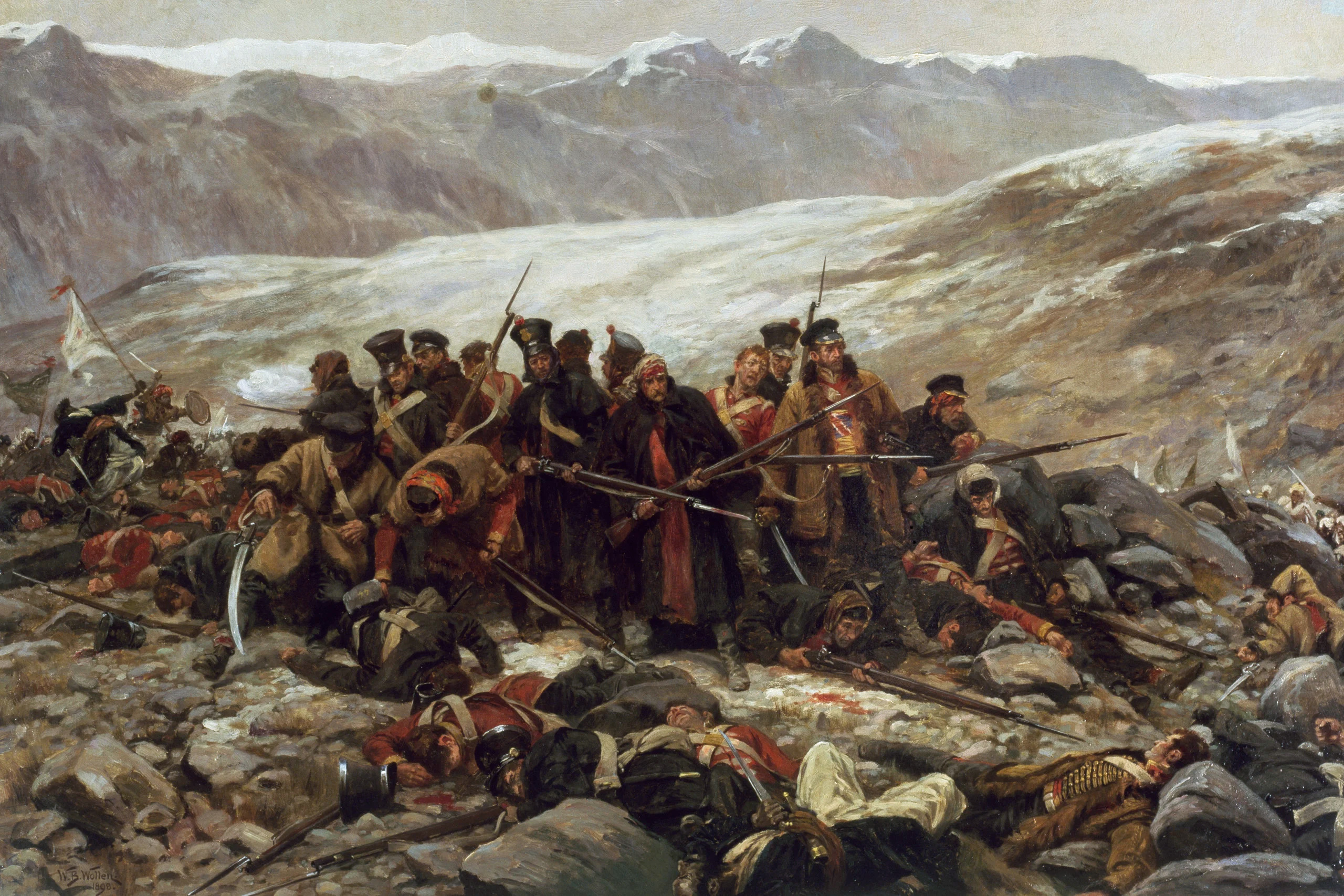
The Last Stand of the 44th Regiment at Gundamuck by William Barnes Wollen, 1898

Shelton himself escaped the slaughter of his troops, though he sustained five wounds in the battle. His failure at Bimaru had a disastrous effect on morale. Mackenzie wrote that his incapacity "neutralised the heroism of the officers. Their spirit was gone and discipline had almost disappeared." No further attempt was taken to drive back the Afghans. Shelton, who was promoted to full colonel following the battle, advocated that a retreat to Jalalabad should commence before the winter snowfall came. Elphinstone, however, prevaricated for nearly a month before attempting to begin negotiations with the Afghan side. The British emissary, Sir William Hay Macnaghten, was killed two weeks into the negotiations and on 6 January the retreat got underway.

Thousands died over the following five days as the slow-moving British column was repeatedly ambushed by the Afghans. By 11 January, 12,000 of the 16,500-strong column had become casualties and only 200 troops remained as the survivors entered the small village of Jagadalak. Shelton was among them, fighting vigorously despite only having one arm. Captain Hugh Johnson wrote: "Nothing could exceed the bravery of Shelton. He was like a bulldog assaulted on all sides by a lot of curs trying to snap at his head, tail and sides. Shelton's small band was attacked by horse and foot, and although the latter were fifty to one, not a man dared to come close ... We cheered him in true English fashion as he descended into the valley, notwithstanding we, at the time, were acting as targets for the marksmen of the enemy on the hills."

Johnson accompanied Shelton and Elphinstone to a negotiation with the Afghan leader, Wazir Akbar Khan, but all three men were taken prisoner. A furious Shelton demanded that he should be allowed to return to his men and die fighting, but was refused. The remainder of the column was left to fend for itself but was massacred at Gandamak. Only one badly wounded European, Assistant Surgeon William Brydon, and a few Indian sepoys managed to reach Jalalabad on 13 January.

== Aftermath ==
Shelton was one of 32 British officers and a larger number of captured soldiers, women and children who were detained by Akbar Khan for several months after the battle. Although the captives were treated considerately, Shelton appears to have taken his captivity poorly. He soon came to be detested by his fellow captives for his quarrelsome nature and Captain Souter, one of his regiment's officers, wrote in a letter home: "We all wear Affghan dresses of one sort or another, except Shelton, who has not adopted them; he looks the picture of misery, with a great big grey beard and mustaches; he meets with little courtesy, every one thinking himself on an equality with the other." Elphinstone died in captivity, leaving Shelton as the highest-ranking British survivor.

The captives were freed on 21 September but Shelton was placed under arrest by Lord Ellenborough, the Governor-General of India. He was court-martialled at Ludhiana on 31 January 1842, charged with four counts. The first stated that he had "prematurely, and without authority" ordered ammunition wagons to be emptied and filled instead with provisions for the retreat from Kabul, without Elphinstone's authorisation. The other three, less serious, charges were that he had used disrespectful language about Elphinstone in front of the troops, that he had procured fodder for his horses from Akbar Khan and that he had allowed himself to be taken prisoner at Jagdalak. Despite Shelton's obvious failures he was acquitted of three out of the four charges. He was convicted on the least serious of the four, that of having illicitly procuring food for his horses, but escaped punishment as the court considered that he had been adequately censured at the time by "competent authority", i.e. Elphinstone.

Although the court opined that Shelton had given proof "of very considerable exertion in his arduous position, of personal gallantry of the highest kind, and of noble devotion as a soldier", he was roundly condemned by some of his fellow officers. General Charles Napier annotated his copy of The Military Operations at Cabul by Lieutenant Vincent Eyre with scathing comments about Shelton, of whom Napier wrote: "It seems to me that to Shelton may be traced the whole misfortune of this Army." He described Shelton as "unfit to command" and thought that he should have been shot as "the author of all ill".

== Death and burial ==
Shelton resumed his command of the 44th Foot, which had to be raised afresh as it had been virtually wiped out during the retreat. He was no more popular with his new troops than he had been before. On 10 May 1845, when his regiment was quartered in Dublin's Richmond Barracks, his horse bolted while he was riding it and he sustained severe injuries, dying three days later. When his men heard of his death they assembled on the parade ground to give three cheers. He received no medals or decorations for his many campaigns.

The burial took place at St Peter's Church in Dublin, which was demolished in 1983. The text of his memorial tablet was taken largely from the 1845 edition of Hart's Annual Army List and read:

SACRED TO THE MEMORY OF COLONEL JOHN SHELTON, WHO DIED IN COMMAND OF HER MAJESTY'S 44TH REGIMENT, ON THE 16TH OF MAY, 1845, AGED 54 YEARS, WHOSE REMAINS ARE DEPOSITED IN THE VAULT AT THE SOUTH SIDE OF THE CHURCH. THIS DISTINGUISHED SOLDIER SERVED IN THE BATTLES OF ROLICIA, VIMIERA, THE RETREAT TO AND BATTLE OF CORUNNA, THE EXPEDITION TO WALCHEREN IN 1809, INCLUDING THE SIEGE OF FLUSHING: HE AFTERWARDS RETURNED TO THE PENINSULA AND WAS PRESENT AT THE SIEGE AND CAPTURE OF BADAJOS, THE BATTLE OF SALAMANCA, THE CAPTURE OF MADRID, THE RETREAT FROM BURGOS, THE BATTLE OF VITTORIA, AND THE SIEGE AND CAPTURE OF ST SEBASTIAN, WHERE HE WAS SEVERELY WOUNDED AND LOST HIS RIGHT ARM. SUBSEQUENTLY HE SERVED IN THE CAMPAIGN OF 1814 IN CANADA, IN 1822 HE EMBARKED FOR THE EAST INDIES, WHERE HE SERVED FOR 21 YEARS, AND WAS EMPLOYED IN THE CAMPAIGN FOR AVA, AND THE TAKING OF ARRACAN. HE SERVED IN THE DISASTROUS RETREAT FROM CABOOL IN THE WINTER OF 1841–2. THIS TABLET IS ERECTED BY HIS NEPHEW WILLIAM SHELTON, FORMERLY OF THE ABOVE REG^{T} AND CAPT OF THE 9TH FOOT.
