= C. E. Lane =

British general in the Indian army

- Born: 29 October 1786
- Died: 18 February 1872 (aged 85); Jersey
- Occupation: General in the Indian army

Charles Edward William Lane CB (29 October 1786 – 18 February 1872) was a British general in the Indian army.

== Biography ==
Lane was the son of John and Melissa Lane. He was born 29 October 1786, and was baptised at St. Martin’s-in-the-Fields, London, in November the same year. He was nominated to a cadetship in 1806, and passed an examination in Persian and Hindustani, for which he was awarded a gratuity of twelve hundred rupees and a sword. His commissions in the infantry were: ensign 13 August 1807, lieutenant 14 July 1812, captain (army 5 February 1822) 30 January 1824, major 30 April 1835, lieutenant-colonel 26 December 1841, colonel 25 May 1852. He became major-general in 1854, lieutenant-general in 1866, general in 1870. He shared the Deccan prize as lieutenant 1st Bengal native infantry for ‘general captures.’ He sought permission in 1824 to change his name to Mattenby, but the request was refused as beyond the competence of the Indian government. He served with the 2nd native grenadier battalion in Arracan in 1825, was timber agent at Naulpore in 1828, and was in charge of the commissariat at Dinapore in 1832. As major he commanded his regiment in Afghanistan under Sir William Nott in 1842, and commanded the garrison of Candahar when, during the temporary absence of Nott, the place was assaulted on 10 March 1842 by an Afghan detachment, which was repulsed with heavy loss (see London Gazette, 6 Sept. 1842). Lane received the medal for Candahar and Cabul, and was made C.B. 27 December 1842. He died in Jersey 18 February 1872, aged 85.
