= Thomas John Anquetil =

Officer of the British Indian Army

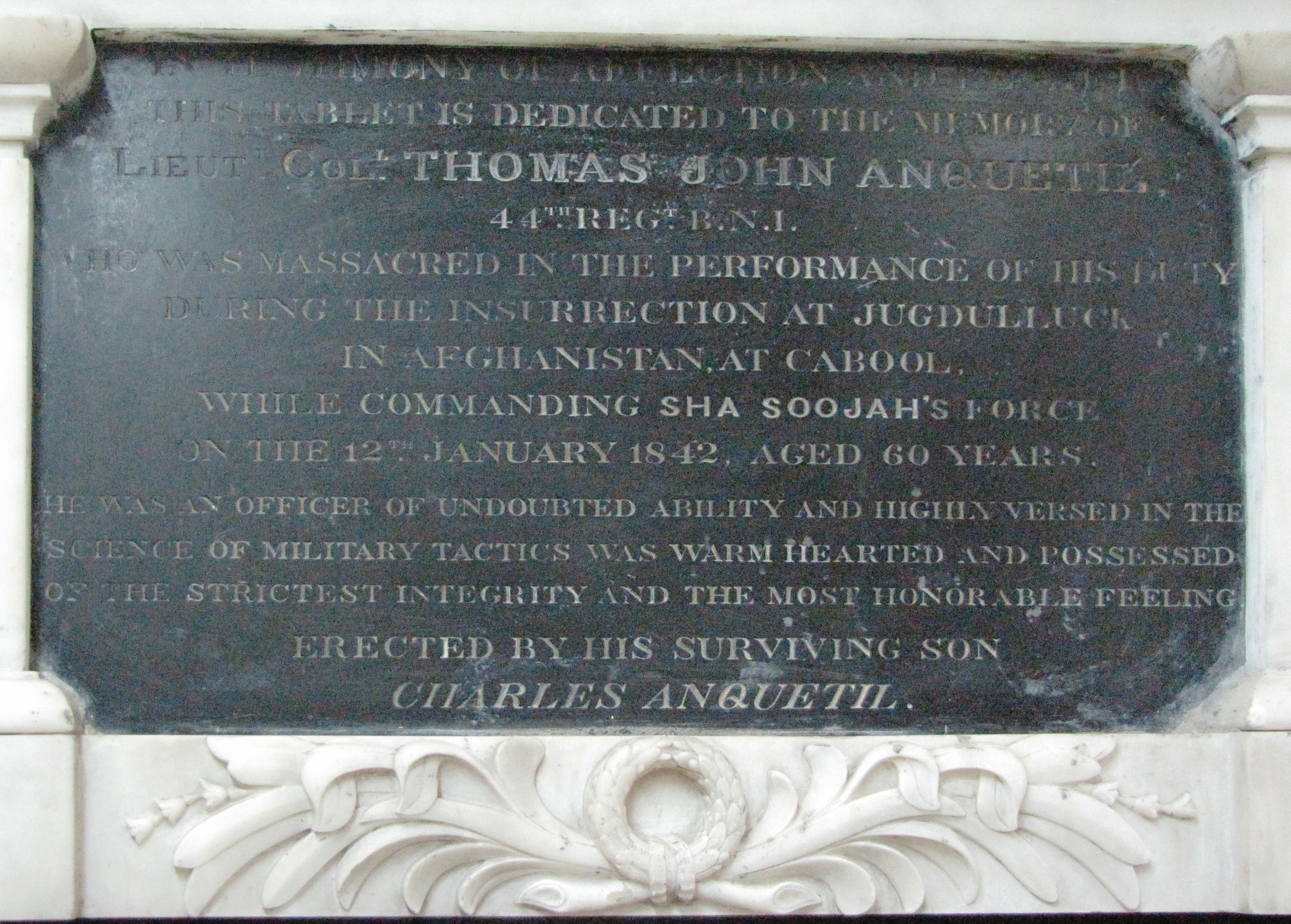
- Memorial in St Peter's Anglican Church (Fort William, Kolkata)
- Born: December 1784; Jersey, Channel Islands
- Died: 12 January 1842 (aged 58); Afghanistan
- Military career
- Allegiance: United Kingdom
- Branch: East India Company's Bengal Army
- Service years: 1804–42
- Rank: Lieutenant Colonel (Brigadier General in the British Indian army)
- Units: 22nd, 44th and 57th Regiments Bengal Native Infantry
- Wars: Shekhawati Campaign; First Anglo-Afghan War

Brigadier General Thomas John Anquetil (1784 – 12 January 1842) was an officer of the British Indian Army who was the last senior officer to command the ill-fated Army of the Indus force as it retreated from Kabul in the First Anglo-Afghan War in 1842. His superiors during the campaign were Generals Sir William Elphinstone and John Shelton. Elphinstone and Shelton were captured and interned by the Afghan rebels, Anquetil on the other hand would die fighting with his force in the mountain passes between Kabul and Jalalabad. The British Army and East India Company would lose 4,500 men (mainly Indian soldiers) and 12,000 civilians (mainly Indian), massacred by Afghan tribesmen loyal to the rebel leader Wazir Akbar Khan. Anquetil was said to have died ‘fighting hand to hand with the enemy’ near Jugdulluk, close to the Kabul pass.

== Family background ==
Thomas John Anquetil is recorded as being baptised at his parents’ home and later registered in Saint Helier, Jersey on 17 January 1785. His parents were Thomas Anquetil and Marie Poingdestre.

== Military career ==
In 1803 Anquetil is recorded in the 6th Class of Cadets in India as a cadet officer destined for the Bengal Native Infantry. He served in the Mahratta campaign attached to the Light Brigade. He commanded the Pioneer Corps, the 22nd, 44th and 57th Bengal Native Infantry Regiments. He was appointed Adjutant-General of General Robert Stevenson's force in the Shekhawati campaign of 1834 in the restive Rajputna Agency. He was then appointed brigadier and commanded the Oudh Contingent. He went on to command Shah Shuja's army. He was killed in the retreat from Kabul at or near an ambush at Jagdalak on 12 January 1842.

== Memorials ==
Anquetil has no known grave; as with most of the fallen of his force their remains were scattered where they fell in the mountain passes of Afghanistan. He is remembered in two churches: one in the Anglican parish church in St Helier, Jersey; the other in St John's Church in Kolkata, India.
