= 1842 retreat from Kabul =

Retreat during the First Anglo-Afghan War

Massacre of Elphinstone's army
- Part of the First Anglo-Afghan War, 1839–1842
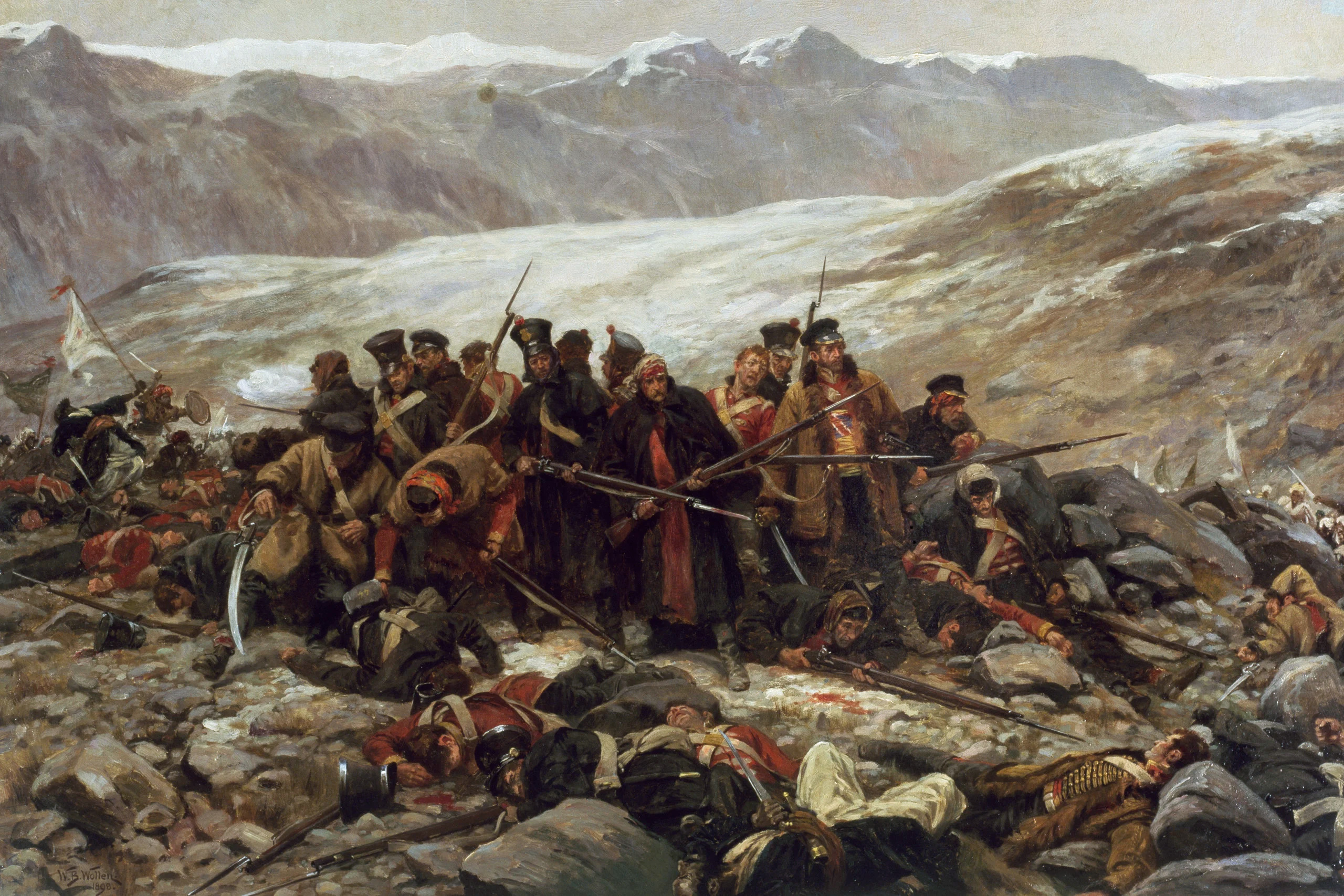
- The Last Stand of the 44th Regiment at Gundamuck by William Barnes Wollen, 1898
Date	6–13 January 1842
Location	Kabul–Jalalabad Road, near Gandamak, Afghanistan
Result	Afghan victory

Belligerents
Emirate of Kabul	British Empire; East India Company

Commanders and leaders
Mohammad Akbar Khan	(East India Company) William Elphinstone † (East India Company) John Shelton (POW)

Strength
Unknown but a British source states possibly up to 30,000	4,500 regular troops (700 British and 3,800 Indian) and approximately 14,000 civilians (workers, family members and camp followers)

Casualties and losses
Unknown	~Approximately 16,500 soldiers and civilians killed, missing, or captured

The 1842 retreat from Kabul was the retreat of the British and East India Company forces from Kabul during the First Anglo-Afghan War. An uprising in Kabul forced the then-commander, Major-General William Elphinstone, to fall back to the British garrison at Jalalabad. In early January 1842, as the army and its numerous dependants and camp followers began their march, they came under attack from Afghan tribesmen. Many in the column died of exposure, frostbite or starvation, or were killed during the fighting.

At the beginning of the conflict, British and East India Company forces had defeated the forces of Afghan Emir Dost Mohammad Barakzai and in 1839 occupied Kabul, restoring the former ruler, Shah Shujah Durrani, as emir. However, a deteriorating situation made their position more and more precarious, until an uprising in Kabul forced Maj. Gen. Elphinstone to withdraw. To this end he negotiated an agreement with Wazir Akbar Khan, one of the sons of Dost Mohammad Barakzai, by which Elphinstone’s army was to be guaranteed security as they fell back to the Jalalabad garrison, more than 140 kilometres (90 mi) away.

No sooner had the British left Kabul than Afghans loyal to Akbar launched attacks against the column, continuing to harry it as it made slow progress through the winter snows along the route that is now the Kabul–Jalalabad Road. In total the British army lost 4,500 troops, along with about 12,000 civilians: the latter comprising both the families of Indian and British soldiers, plus workmen, servants and other Indian camp followers. The final stand was made just outside a village called Gandamak on 13 January.

Out of more than 16,000 people from the column commanded by Elphinstone, only one European (Assistant Surgeon William Brydon) and a few Indian sepoys reached Jalalabad. Over one hundred British prisoners and civilian hostages were later released. An uncertain number of the Indians, many of whom were maimed by frostbite, survived and returned to Kabul to exist as beggars or to be sold into slavery elsewhere. About 2,000 sepoys returned to India after another British invasion of Kabul several months later, but others remained behind in Afghanistan.

In 2013, a writer for The Economist called the retreat "the worst British military disaster until the fall of Singapore exactly a century later."

== Background ==
In 1838 the East India Company feared an increased Russian influence in Afghanistan after Dost Mohammad Barakzai had seized power from former ruler Shuja Shah Durrani in 1834. Dost Mohammad had rejected earlier overtures from Russia, but after Lord Auckland, the Governor-General of India, tried to force Afghan foreign policy under British guidance, he renewed his relationship with the Russians. Lord Auckland followed the counsel of his adviser William Hay Macnaghten to support Shuja Shah, dismissing the advice of Alexander Burnes that Dost Mohammad should be supported, and resolved to seek a military solution. He began to assemble his forces in late 1838.

The army, under the command of General Sir Willoughby Cotton, with Macnaghten as his chief adviser, consisted of 20,000 soldiers and were accompanied by 38,000 civilian camp followers (craftsmen, stretcher bearers, cooks, servants, barbers, tailors, armourers, cameleers, etc., as well as families of both Indian and British soldiers). In March 1839 they crossed the Bolan Pass and began their march to Kabul. They advanced through rough terrain, crossing deserts and mountain passes at an elevation of 4,000 metres (13,000 ft) but made good progress and took Kandahar on 25 April.

They also captured the until-then impregnable fortress of Ghazni on 22 July in a surprise attack, losing 200 men killed and wounded while the Afghans lost nearly 500 men killed and 1,600 taken prisoner, with an unknown number wounded. An Afghan had betrayed his sovereign and the British troops managed to blow one city gate and marched into the city in a euphoric mood. The ample supplies acquired in Ghazni considerably aided the further advance, which otherwise would have been difficult.

Dost Mohammad fled and sought refuge in the wilds of the Hindu Kush. Kabul fell without a fight on 6 August 1839. Shuja Shah returned and was proclaimed emir by the British. He established a court in the fortress of Bala Hissar above Kabul.

More than a year later, Dost Mohammad surrendered to Macnaghten on 4 November 1840 and was exiled to India.

== Occupation ==
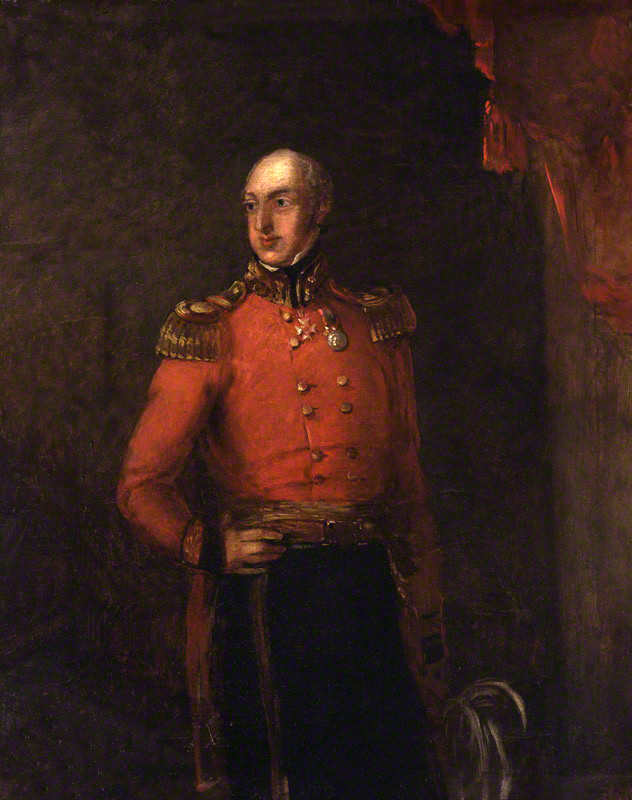
General William Elphinstone, who was given command of British forces in Afghanistan in 1841

In August 1839 the British, under pressure from Shah Shuja, refrained from remaining in occupation of Kabul's citadel, instead establishing their military cantonments 2.5 kilometres (1 1/2 miles) outside Kabul. This decision, made on diplomatic grounds, would prove to be a grave military error that placed the whole garrison in a weak and easily overrun position.

As political agent and envoy at the court of Shuja Shah, Macnaghten became a leader of British society in Kabul. The city was described at the time as clean and pleasant with many spacious wooden houses surrounded by well-kept gardens. The occupiers enjoyed themselves arranging cricket matches, horse races and hunting parties. In the evenings, amateur dramatics were staged by East India Company officers and their wives.

Performances included Shakespeare's A Midsummer Night's Dream. It was considered a special honour to be invited to evening soirées hosted by Florentia Sale (Lady Sale), the wife of Brigadier-General Robert Sale. Such social gatherings often saw the serving of salmon and stew with madeira, port and champagne. Such was the British confidence that most of their troops were soon sent back to India.

While the British enjoyed this lifestyle, some Afghans chafed under occupation by a foreign power. Rumours of relationships between British soldiers and Afghan women created tensions in Kabul. Britain had replaced Dost Mohammad, a (relatively) popular ruler, with Shuja Shah, a weak puppet, who was seen as far crueler to his enemies than his predecessor. In 1840, the son of Dost Mohammad, Wazir Akbar Khan, began assembling allies amongst the tribesmen in the rural areas where British influence was weakest. He initiated a guerrilla war that kept the East India Company troops permanently on the move.

The efforts to control Afghanistan were further weakened by the British government in India. Dismayed at the costs of maintaining the large garrison in Kabul, it discontinued the periodic subsidies (essentially bribes) that had been paid to the various tribes in the region around Kabul and the Khyber Pass to keep the peace. Once these ended, the tribes saw no more reason to remain loyal to the British-supported regime. Macnaghten dismissed warnings of Afghan discontent, writing to his superiors in India that "this is the usual state of Afghan society". As the spring and summer of 1841 progressed, British freedom of movement around Kabul became increasingly restricted.

Despite this ominous turn of events, Sir Willoughby Cotton was replaced as commander of the remaining British troops by Sir William Elphinstone, who was ill at the time and initially unwilling to accept the appointment. The 59-year-old Elphinstone had entered the British army in 1804. He was made a Companion of the Bath for leading the 33rd Regiment of Foot at the Battle of Waterloo. By 1825 he had been promoted to colonel and then to major general in 1837. Although Elphinstone was a man of high birth and perfect manners, his colleague and contemporary General William Nott regarded him as "the most incompetent soldier that was to be found amongst all the officers of requisite rank".

In the autumn of 1841 Brigadier-General Sale and his brigade were recalled to Jalalabad, which was on the military line of communication between Kabul and Peshawar. He left his wife, Lady Sale, behind in the British cantonments in Kabul.

== Afghan uprising ==
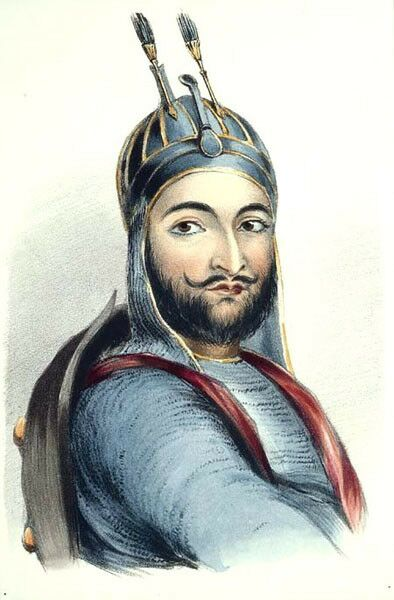
Wazir Akbar Khan, son of deposed Afghan leader, Dost Mohammad Barakzai.

On 2 November 1841, Akbar Khan proclaimed a general revolt and the citizens of Kabul quickly followed suit. They stormed the house of Sir Alexander Burnes, one of the senior British political officers, and killed him and his staff. Both Elphinstone and Macnaghten were caught by surprise. By now the East India Company had only 4,500 soldiers in and around Kabul, of whom 690 were Europeans. Elphinstone did nothing to punish Burnes's killers, which only encouraged further revolt. On 9 November, Afghan forces seized the main British supply depot in Kabul and looted it.

On 23 November, the Afghans occupied a hill overlooking the British cantonments and began bombarding the camp with two guns. A British force sallied out to drive them away, but the Afghans drove them back with jezail fire at long range from the high ground. The East India Company troops fled, leaving behind 300 dead and wounded (who were swiftly killed). British morale began to erode as the situation grew more desperate. Elphinstone sent messengers to request help from Major General Nott in Kandahar, but they turned back when they found the mountain passes blocked by heavy snow.

Macnaghten, realising their desperate situation, tried to negotiate an agreement with Akbar Khan for the withdrawal of the troops and the 12,000 British and Indian civilians living in Kabul. On 23 December, Afghan leaders invited him and his fellow diplomats to an outdoor meeting beyond the cantonment. A cavalry escort was assigned for protection, but Macnaghten chose to continue without them when they were delayed by preparation issues. The moment his party dismounted from their horses, they were seized and Macnaghten and an aide were slain by armed men; their bodies were mutilated and dragged through the streets of Kabul.

Two other British officers who had been part of Macnaghten's party were subsequently released. Elphinstone again failed to take action against the Afghans, and his officers began to lose their faith in his leadership.

Major Eldred Pottinger succeeded Macnaghten as envoy to the Afghan court. On 1 January 1842, Elphinstone agreed to Akbar Khan's terms, which contained some unfavourable conditions. For example, all gunpowder reserves had to be handed over, along with the newest muskets and most of the cannon. However, in return Akbar Khan promised a safe passage from Kabul for all foreign troops and civilians, amongst them children, women and the elderly. The withdrawal, which would begin on 6 January, involved crossing the snow-covered mountains of the Hindu Kush descending to Jalalabad, 140 kilometres (90 mi) away.

== Elphinstone's army ==
Elphinstone commanded a column consisting of the 1st Battalion of the 44th (East Essex) Regiment of Foot, the 5th, 37th and 54th Regiments of Bengal Native Infantry, one regiment of Shah Shuja's Levy, Anderson's Irregular Horse, the 5th Bengal Light Cavalry and a detachment of the Bengal Horse Artillery with 6 guns and attached sappers. In total, the column comprised 700 British and 3,800 Indian troops. The camp followers, Indian and British families, their servants and civilian workers, numbered approximately 14,000.

== Retreat and massacre ==
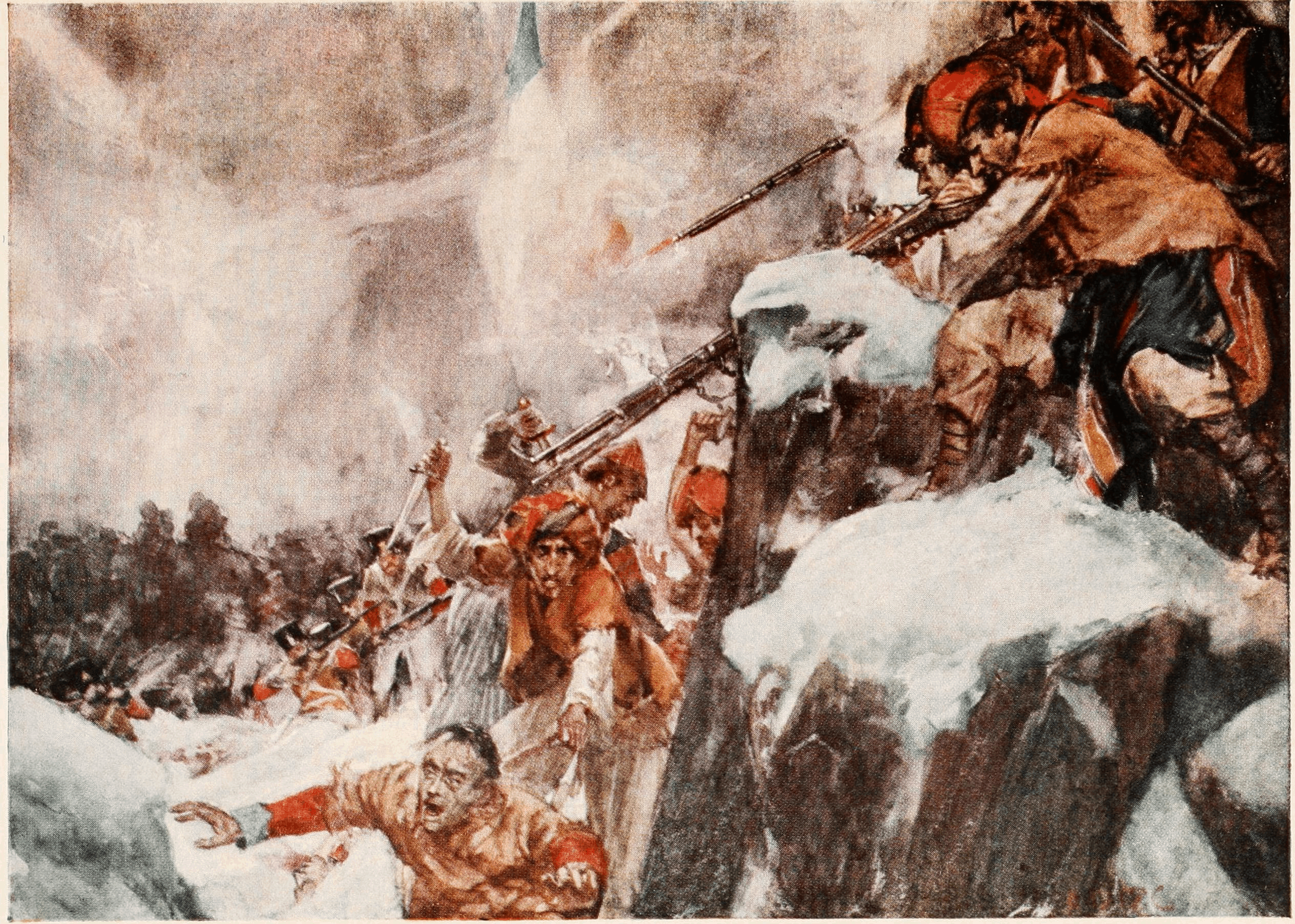
A 1909 illustration by Arthur David McCormick depicting British troops trying to fight their way through the pass.

At first light on 6 January Elphinstone's column began slowly to move out of Kabul leaving Shuja Shah Durrani and his followers to their fate. As Akbar Khan had guaranteed safety to all concerned, the sick, wounded and infirm were also left behind. However once the rearguard finally left the cantonments, Afghans quickly moved in and began firing at the retreating troops from the walls while setting fire to the garrison buildings, killing all those left behind.

On leaving the city, Elphinstone discovered that the escort promised by Akbar Khan had not materialised, nor had the food and fuel to help with the crossing of the Hindu Kush in winter. Major Eldred Pottinger pleaded with the sick British commander to turn back to Kabul as they still had time to take refuge in the fortress of Bala Hissar. But Elphinstone said there would be no turning back and they would proceed to Jalalabad. The column of 16,000 soldiers and civilians was now at the mercy of the Afghan tribes.

By the second day, sniping from the surrounding hills was taking its toll on the slow-moving column. Despite being well armed, the troops' progress was being hindered by the terrified civilians and camp followers. Small skirmishes were frequent. The Afghans succeeded in capturing some of the column's artillery while forcing the British to spike two of their three remaining pieces. In just 24 hours the column now had only one small gun and two heavier cannons left.

Later that afternoon, Akbar Khan met Elphinstone, feigning ignorance to any treachery on his part. He told the British that he had been unable to provide the agreed escort because they had left their cantonments earlier than expected. Akbar Khan then asked Elphinstone to wait while he negotiated the column's safe passage with the Afghan chiefs who commanded Khord-Kabul pass 25 kilometres (15 mi) from Kabul. Despite what had already occurred, the British commander agreed to the terms and waited. He also agreed to hand over three more European hostages to Akbar Khan.

Instead of hurrying forward, Elphinstone had moved only ten kilometres (6 mi) from Kabul. By now efforts to maintain military cohesion had also begun to fail. When the column entered the narrow six-kilometre (four-mile) pass the next day, they were shot at from all sides by Ghilzais armed with captured British muskets and their traditional jezails. It was now apparent Akbar Khan had not been negotiating their safe passage; it was actually a ruse to give the Afghans more time to get into position for an ambush.

Throughout the third day, the column laboured through the pass. Once the main body had moved through, the Afghans left their positions to massacre the stragglers and the wounded. By the evening of 9 January, the column had only moved 40 kilometres (25 mi) but already 3,000 people had died. Many had been killed in the fighting, but some had frozen to death or taken their own lives. A written report by Elphinstone recorded that most of the sepoys had by this stage lost fingers or toes in the freezing conditions, and that their snow-encrusted muskets had become unusable.

By the fourth day, a few hundred native soldiers deserted and tried to return to Kabul, but they were all either killed or enslaved. By now Elphinstone, who had ceased giving orders, sat silently on his horse. On the evening of 9 January, Lady Sale, along with the wives and children of both British and Indian officers, and their retinues, accepted Akbar Khan's assurances of protection. Despite deep mistrust, the group was taken into the custody of Akbar's men. Once they were hostages, all the Indian servants and sepoy wives were murdered.

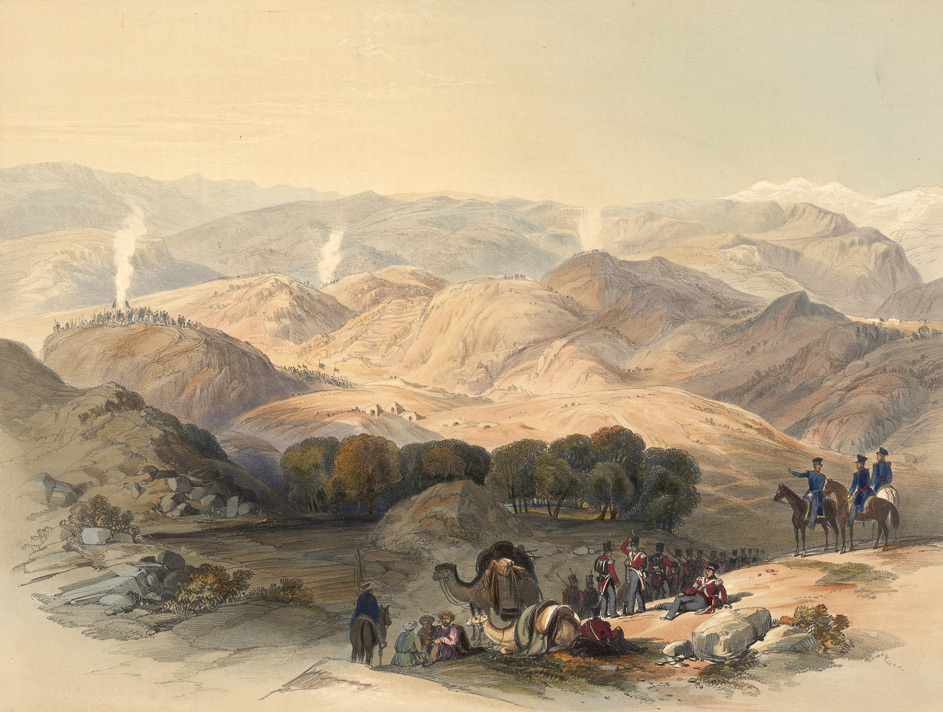
The Grove and Valley of Jugdulluk where Elphinstone's Army made its last stand in the calamitous retreat; January 1842. As drawn on the spot by James Rattray.

By the evening of 11 January, the army had been reduced to 200 men. The small rearguard was led by Brigadier-General John Shelton who, for the first time in the retreat, showed his competence and led a fierce resistance against the Afghans. As the surviving troops lay besieged in a small ruined mud-walled enclosure in Jagadalak, Akbar Khan's envoys returned and persuaded Elphinstone and his second in command, Shelton, to accompany them for negotiations.

Akbar Khan brought the two officers to his camp and provided them with dinner. The reasons for his hospitality soon became clear however and both officers were refused permission to return to their men. Shelton became furious and demanded the right as an officer and soldier to return to lead his men and die fighting.

On 12 January, the column, having lost their commander and over 12,000 casualties, decided that their only hope was to wait until night and press on in the dark. The remaining troops, now led by Brigadier-General Thomas John Anquetil, found their path blocked by a formidable thorny barrier of 'prickly holly oak, well twisted together, about six feet high' which had been erected across the narrowest part of the valley. Most of the men who attempted to scale the barrier were shot down before they could reach the other side. All discipline amongst the remainder of the men who were trapped by the barrier now ended and the Afghans closed in to finish them off. The few remaining men who had managed to scale the barrier began a desperate gallop towards Jalalabad but many were slaughtered in a melee just after reaching the other side of the barrier.

The biggest single surviving group of men, consisting of 20 officers and 45 European soldiers, mostly infantry from the 44th Regiment of Foot, tried to press on but found themselves surrounded on a snowy hillock near the village of Gandamak. With only 20 working muskets and two shots per weapon, the troops refused to surrender. A British sergeant is said to have cried "not bloody likely!" when the Afghans tried to persuade the soldiers they would spare their lives.

Sniping then began, followed by a series of rushes; soon the hillock was overrun by tribesmen. An officer named Captain Souter was mistaken by the Afghans as a high-ranking officer because they thought he was wearing a general's yellow waistcoat. In fact the officer had wrapped the regimental colours of the 44th Foot around his body. He was dragged into captivity along with a sergeant named Fair and seven privates. The remaining troops were killed.

Another group of fifteen mounted officers managed to reach as far as the village of Fattehabad but ten were killed while sitting down to accept breakfast from the villagers, four were shot from the rooftops as they remounted their horses and attempted to flee the village and one was tracked down and beheaded.

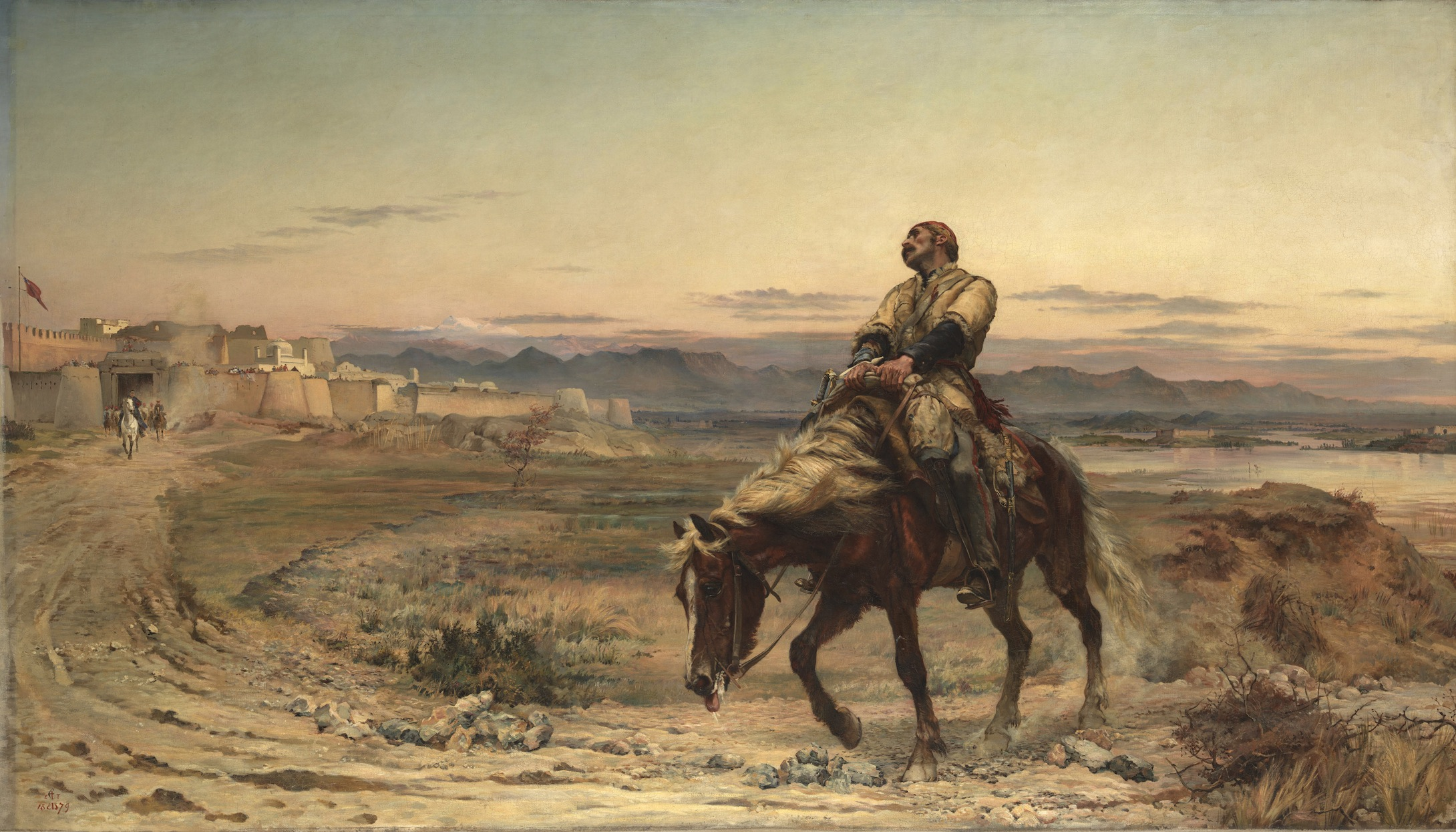
Remnants of an Army by Elizabeth Butler depicting the arrival of assistant surgeon William Brydon at Jalalabad on 13 January 1842.

On 13 January, a British officer from the 16,000 strong column rode into Jalalabad on a wounded horse (a few sepoys, who had hidden in the mountains, followed in the coming weeks). Assistant Surgeon William Brydon, who was riding a pony taken from a mortally wounded officer after being begged by the man not to let it fall into anyone else's hands, continued on despite him and his pony being severely wounded in several skirmishes with roaming bands of Afghans.

On 13 January and now just kilometres from Jalalabad, Brydon had to fight for his life against a party of Afghan horsemen. After escaping a single pursuer, he was spotted by a staff officer on the walls of Jalalabad who immediately dispatched riders to meet the exhausted surgeon. Brydon was asked upon arrival what happened to the army, to which he answered "I am the army".

Although part of his skull had been sheared off by a sword, he ultimately survived because he had insulated his hat with a magazine which deflected the blow. Brydon later published a memoir of the death march. The pony he rode was said to have lain down in a stable and never got up. For several nights, lights were raised on the gates of Jalalabad and bugles were sounded from the walls in the hope of guiding any further survivors to safety.

== Aftermath ==
The annihilation left Britain and India in shock and the Governor General, Lord Auckland, suffered an apparent stroke upon hearing the news. In the autumn of 1842, an "Army of Retribution" led by Sir George Pollock, with William Nott and Robert Sale commanding divisions, leveled the great bazaar and all the larger buildings of Kabul. Sale personally rescued his wife Lady Sale and some other hostages from the hands of Wazir Akbar Khan. However, the slaughter of an army by Afghan tribesmen was humiliating for the British authorities in India.

Of the British prisoners, 32 officers, over 50 soldiers, 21 children and 12 women survived to be released in September 1842. An unknown number of sepoys and other Indian prisoners were sold into slavery in Kabul or kept as captives in mountain villages. One sepoy, Havildar Sita Ram, escaped from Afghanistan after 21 months of slavery and rejoined his former regiment at Delhi. Around 2,000 sepoys and camp followers were eventually found in Kabul and brought back to India by General Pollock's army.

The leadership of Elphinstone is seen as a notorious example of how the ineptitude and indecisiveness of a senior officer could compromise the morale and effectiveness of a whole army (though already much depleted). Elphinstone completely failed to lead his soldiers, but fatally exerted enough authority to prevent any of his officers from exercising proper command in his place.

Historians still debate whether Akbar Khan ordered the massacre, sanctioned it, or was simply unable to prevent it. Some of the British officers and families taken hostage later claimed that Akbar Khan had called out "Spare them!" in Persian, but "Kill them!" in Pashto to the tribesmen. Either way, the British reaction to such an atrocity must have been clear to him. Akbar Khan became the emir of Afghanistan in May 1842, and ruled until Dost Mohammad Khan's return in 1843. In 1847 he died of cholera.

Dost Mohammad remained a British prisoner till the end of 1841 when he was set free by the British authorities who, after they took their revenge on Kabul, had resolved to abandon any attempts to intervene in the internal affairs of Afghanistan. After Shuja Shah was assassinated in April 1842, Dost Mohammad quickly reestablished his authority. He died on 9 June 1863 of natural causes, one of the few Afghan rulers in the past thousand years to do so. Even after the two British invasions of his country, he did not intervene in any manner during the Indian Rebellion of 1857.

The destruction of several regiments of Indian troops during the retreat inevitably affected the morale of the East India Company's Bengal Army from which these units had been drawn. The reputation for invincibility previously enjoyed by the EIC was broken. "Men remembered Kabul," commented a British officer at the outbreak of the great Bengal mutiny fifteen years later.

== Depictions ==
German novelist and poet Theodor Fontane in 1858 wrote the ballad Das Trauerspiel von Afghanistan (The Tragedy of Afghanistan).

British writer George MacDonald Fraser describes this event in the first book of his Flashman Papers series, Flashman.

It was the background to the 1973 Australian play Kabul.

Victoria (2017) episode "A Soldier's Daughter" dramatizes Brydon's survival in the retreat. In the show, Queen Victoria responds to the loss of life in the retreat with a speech at the launch of HMS Trafalgar, and by privately meeting and honouring Brydon.

== See also ==
- The Great Game
- List of massacres in Afghanistan
- Ambela Pass
