= Macnaghten baronets =

There have been two Macnaghten baronetcies in the Baronetage of the United Kingdom:

- Macnaghten baronets of Bushmills House (1836)
- Macnaghten baronets (1840): see William Hay Macnaghten (1793–1841)
