= Jezail =

Simple and cheap Afghan rifle

The jezail (or jezzail), also spelled juzail (or juzzail), is a long-barrelled firearm both smoothbore and rifled used in Central Asia, British India, and parts of Middle East. A person operating it is called jazailchi.

Jezails were used by the elite jazayerchi troops of Safavid and Afsharid Iran, notably during the Naderian Wars. It was the main weapon used by Pashtun tribesmen of Afghanistan in the 19th-century, who deposed Shah Shuja and fought in the First and Second Anglo-Afghan Wars.

== Features ==
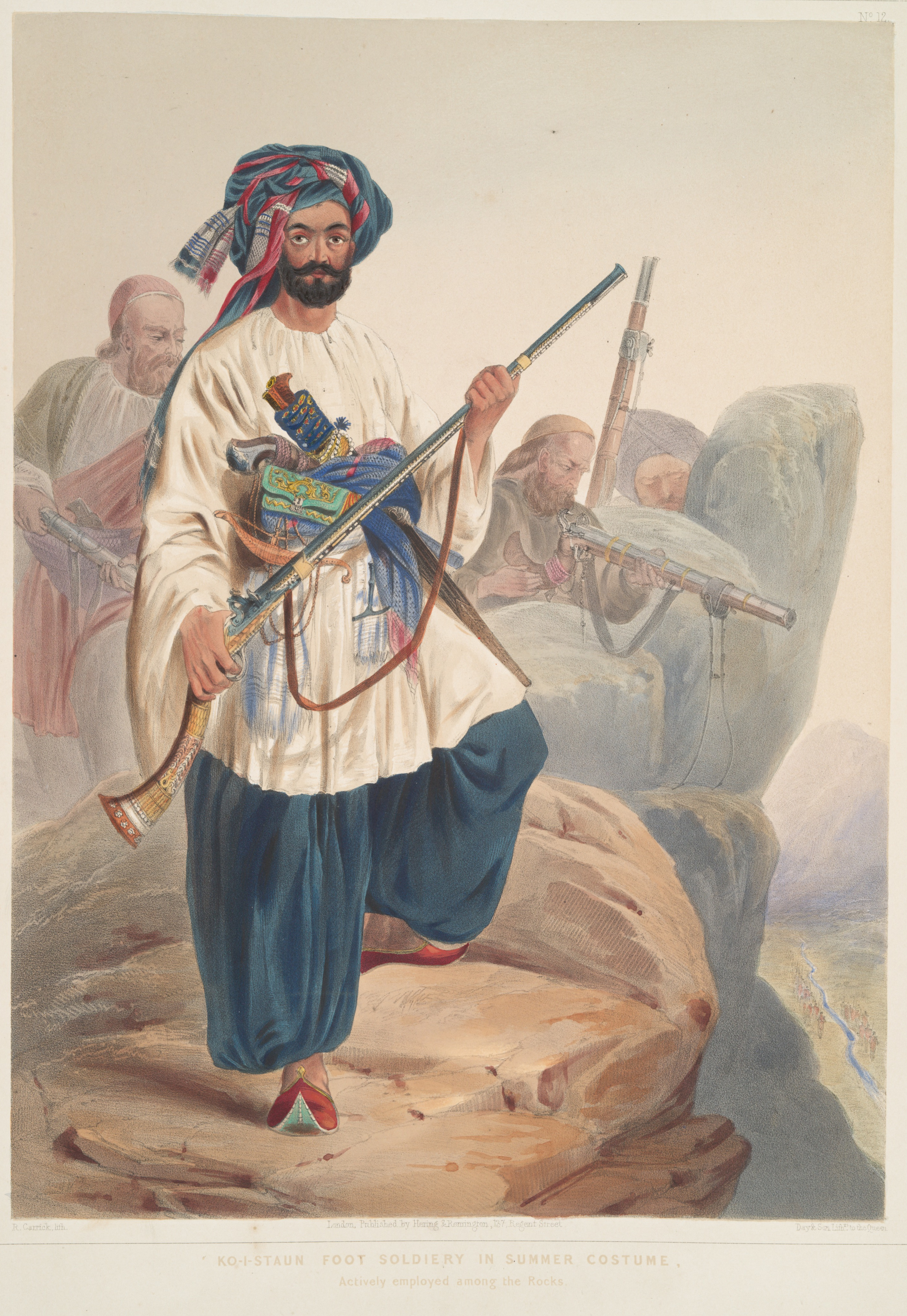
Lithograph dated during the First Anglo-Afghan War of a Tajik warrior (Kohistani) and his jezail.

Jezails (in Afghanistan) were often handmade weapons. That means unlike other weapons of the time, which were plain and utilitarian, jezails tended to be well-crafted, personal, and varied widely in their construction and decoration.

Jezails had very long barrels, which were uncommon in European counterparts (aside from the Spanish espingarda of the 15th century), but were common in the American rifles, such as the Kentucky rifle. These American rifles were of a smaller caliber (typically .35 to .45 inches (8.9 to 11.4 mm)) as their primary use was hunting, while jezails had a caliber of .50 to .75 inches (13 to 19 mm) and larger, making them suitable for warfare. Having a long length, jezails were heavier (typically 12 to 14 pounds (5.4 to 6.4 kg)) than typical muskets of the time (typically 9 to 10 pounds (4.1 to 4.5 kg)). This allowed the use of larger calibers. The heavy weight of the jezail also reduced recoil. The jezail has a relatively long range of 500 yards (460 m), In comparison, a Brown Bess had an effective range of 150 yards (140 m) and accurate range of 50 yards (46 m). According to some British soldiers, jezails fired a ball three times larger than that of a musket ball, with an accurate range of 400 yards (370 m).

The main weakness of the jezail was its low rate of fire: it fired one shot every two or three minutes, in comparison to two or three shots per minute by a musket. This made it unsuitable during offensive action, while being deadly as a sniper weapon in the mountains, as well as against advancing forces on an open battlefield. In an attack, a soldier carried two or three jezails on his horse and, after shooting them, would either return to a safe distance to reload or proceed with hand-to-hand combat.

Although jezails were mostly smoothbore weapons, some had their barrels rifled, which, combined with the barrel's long length, made it a very accurate weapon for its time.

The lock and trigger mechanism was either a matchlock or a flintlock. Due to the complexity and difficulty of manufacture of the latter, many jezails used the lock mechanism from captured or broken Brown Bess muskets.

A unique feature of the jezail was the handmade stock, which had a distinctive curve and was intricately decorated. The role of the curve is debated. It may have made the stock lighter while still being able to be fired from the shoulder safely. It also allows firing by grasping the weapon near the trigger, like a pistol, while the curved portion is tucked under the forearm (as opposed to being held to the shoulder), allowing firing with one hand while mounted. In this case the flash pan is dangerously too close to the face and the aiming would also be more difficult, therefore this method was probably used only while mounted. The weapon could otherwise be fired from a forked A-shaped rest (which is common in Central Asia), a horn, or a metal bipod, which further improved accuracy.

== Operational history ==
=== In Persia ===
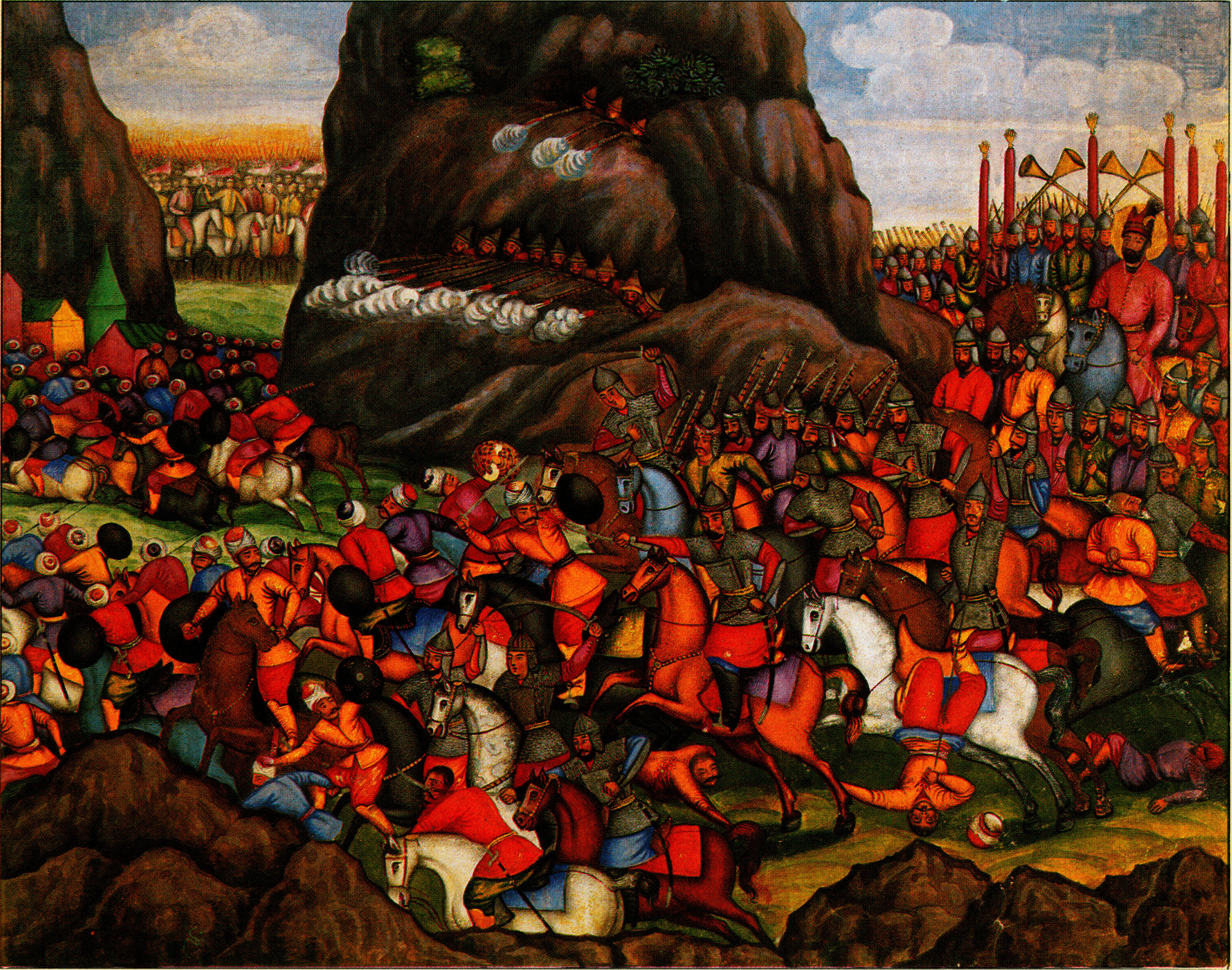
The elite jazayerchi unit shoot from a hill as Nader Shah's forces push the Ottoman army back at the Battle of Yeghevārd.

The jazayer (Persian: جزایر jazāyer or Persian: جزائر jazā'er) was the primary weapon of the elite military unit jazayerchi (جزایرچی jazāyerchī) introduced by the Safavid Shah Abbas II. Due to its heavy weight, it was fired on a tripod.

The Safavid general Nader Shah, who later founded the Afsharid dynasty, also maintained and trained an elite jazayerchi troops, which he used in his Wars with great effect.

=== Anglo-Afghan Wars ===
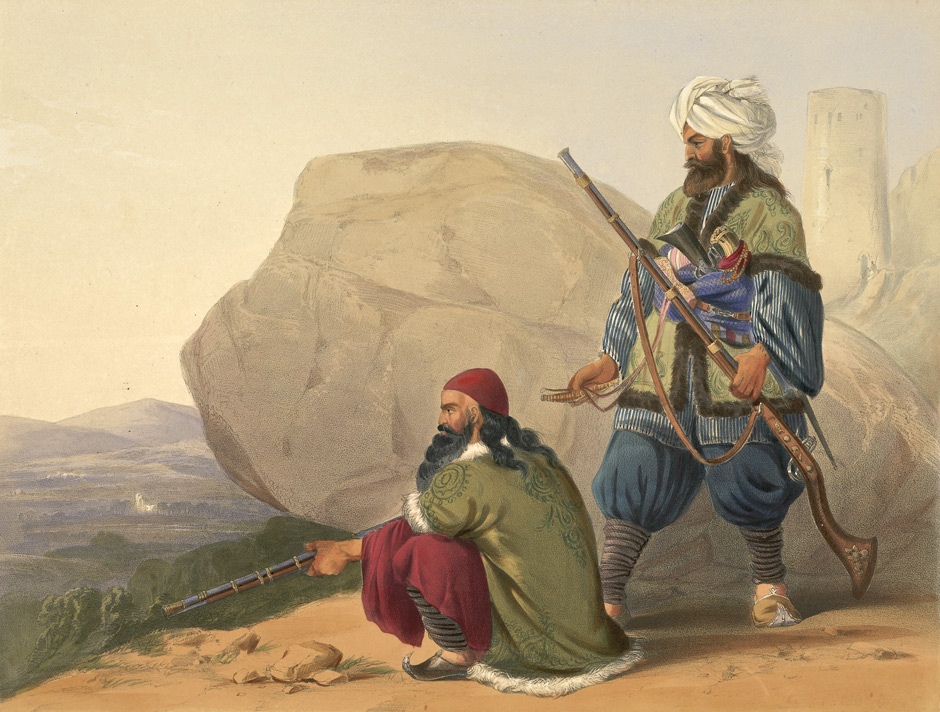
Afghan foot soldiers in 1841.

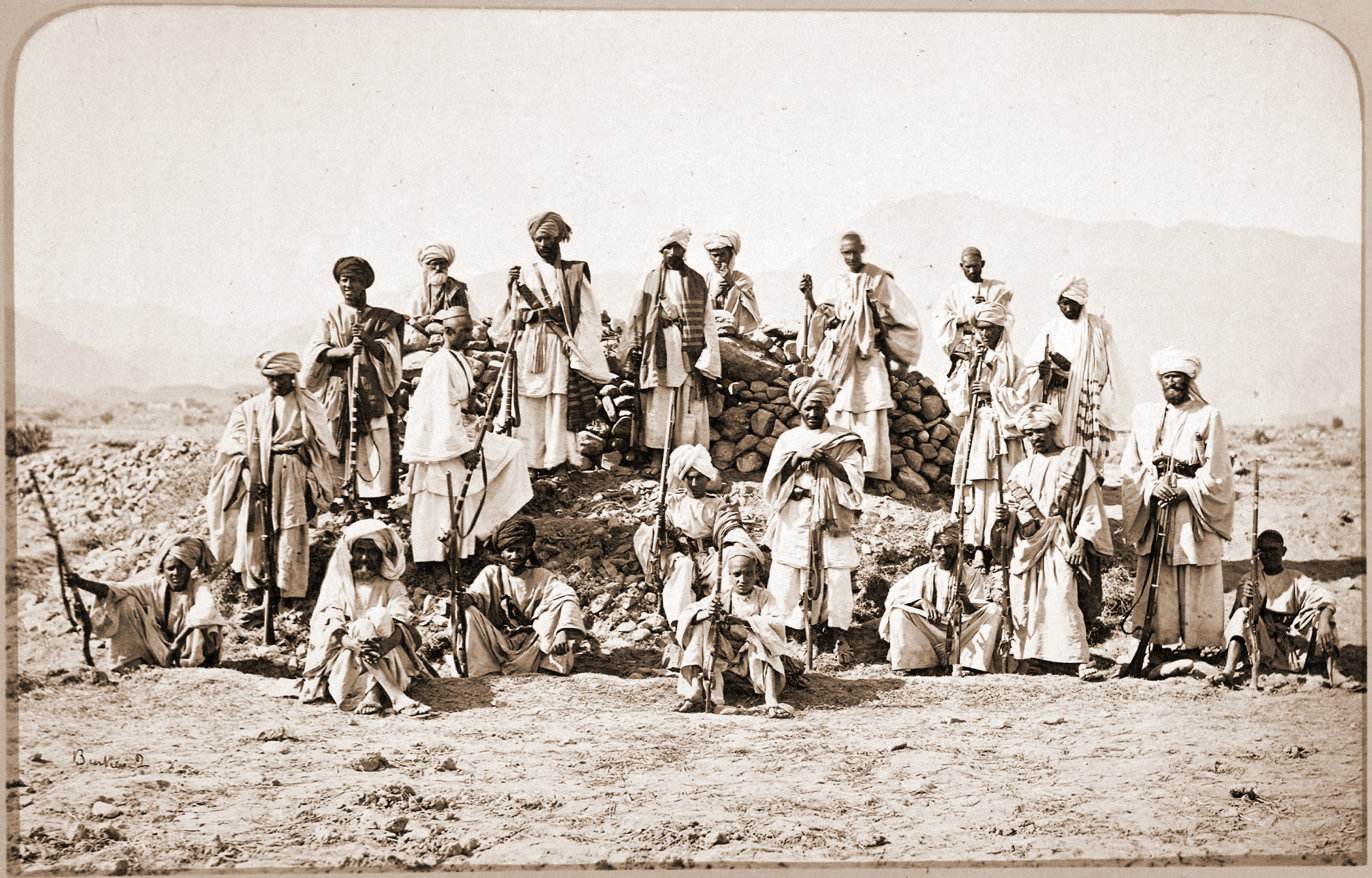
Group of Pashtun Tribesmen (Afridi) fighters in 1878, pictured with their jezails, during the Second Anglo-Afghan War.

During this period, the jezail was the primary weapon used by the Pashtuns and was used with great effect during the First Anglo-Afghan War. The range and accuracy of jezail, combined with the sniping tactics of the Afghans, made it superior to the British Brown Bess smoothbore muskets. The latter was effective at no more than 150 yards, and unable to be consistently accurate beyond 50 yards. Because of their advantage in range, Pashtun marksmen typically used the jezail from the tops of cliffs along valleys and defiles during ambushes. Sir Charles Napier claims however that the musket was overall the superior weapon. The jezailchees repeatedly inflicted heavy casualties on the British during their 1842 retreat from Kabul to Jalalabad.

In the First Anglo-Afghan War the British established a cantonment outside of Kabul with dirt walls approximately waist high. Surrounding the cantonment were several abandoned forts which, although out of range of British muskets, were close enough for jezail fire. When ghazi and other Pashtuns forces besieged Kabul and the cantonment, they occupied the forts and used them to snipe at British forces from a safe range. The Pashtun marksmen typically fired jezail while entrenched in a pushtah (individual rampart made of rocks).

A description from the British Library dating to the First Anglo-Afghan War:

Afghan snipers were expert marksmen and their juzzails fired roughened bullets, long iron nails or even pebbles over a range of some 250 metres. The Afghans could fling the large rifles across their shoulders as if they were feathers and spring nimbly from rock to rock.

At any rate, the British histories that focus on the claimed superiority of the jezail as weapon do not explain the failures of the jezailchis to halt British offensives in 1842.

=== In India ===
Jazail or Jazair in India was a swivel gun falling between a firearm and an artillery, with a length of 7 to 8 feet (2.1 to 2.4 m). The operator of the gun was called jazā'il-andāz or jazā'ilchī in Hindustani language. Related words or spellings are gingall, janjal, ganjal, gazail.

=== Contemporary use ===
The jezail was still in use in Afghanistan in the 20th century. It was replaced by the Martini-Henry and other domestic and foreign rifles. Limited numbers were used by Mujahideen rebels during the Soviet–Afghan War. Jezails can still be found in arms bazaars of Afghanistan.

Derivatives of the jezail, barely recognizable, and usually termed "country-made weapons", are in use in rural India—especially in the state of Uttar Pradesh.

== In English literature ==
The jezail is the weapon which wounded Dr. Watson—the fictional biographer of the fictional detective Sherlock Holmes—in the Battle of Maiwand during his military service in Afghanistan. There are discrepancies regarding the location of the wound, though; in A Study in Scarlet, Watson mentions it to be in the shoulder, while in The Sign of the Four, he mentions his leg, and in "The Adventure of the Noble Bachelor" he refers to the Jezail bullet being "in one of my limbs".

The jezail is mentioned repeatedly in some of Wilbur Smith's books, notably Monsoon. It was also mentioned in the George MacDonald Fraser adventure Flashman, whose protagonist describes the slaughter by Afghan jezailchis during the 1842 retreat from Kabul.

The weapon appears in Rudyard Kipling's 1886 poem "Arithmetic on the Frontier", where the low cost of the weapon is contrasted with the relatively expensive training and education of British officers:

A scrimmage in a Border Station
A canter down some dark defile
Two thousand pounds of education
Drops to a ten-rupee jezail.

In Kipling's novel The Man Who Would Be King, the Kohat Jezail is mentioned along with the more advanced British rifles Snider and Martini.

P. G. Wodehouse in Jill the Reckless (1920) describes how the character Uncle Chris, in India during his first hill-campaign, would "walk up and down in front of his men under a desultory shower of jezail-bullets".

The rifle is also mentioned by Brian Jacques in his adventure novel, Voyage of Slaves.

== In popular culture ==
- Team Fortress 2 features the "Bazaar Bargain", a weapon for the Sniper modeled after the Jezail.
- In the first case of The Great Ace Attorney, the victim is Dr. John Watson (changed to "Wilson" in the localization). His killer is revealed to be Jezaille Brett, a woman whose name references Watson's wounding by Jezail rifle in the original books.
- "Warplock Jezzails" are one of the units available for Skaven factions in Games Workshops: Warhammer Fantasy Battles, which in turn is seen in the video game: Total War: Warhammer III

== See also ==
- Moukahla, a similar North African musket
- Kariofili, musket of the Greek revolution with similar stock shape
- Tançica, a long barreled musket from Albania
- Shishane, miquelet used in the Ottoman Empire
- Džeferdar, ornate musket from Montenegro
- Boyliya, Bulgarian musket with unique lock
- Khirimi, Caucasian miquelet musket
- Arquebus
