= William Nott =

Welsh military officer of the Bengal Army

Major General Sir William Nott GCB
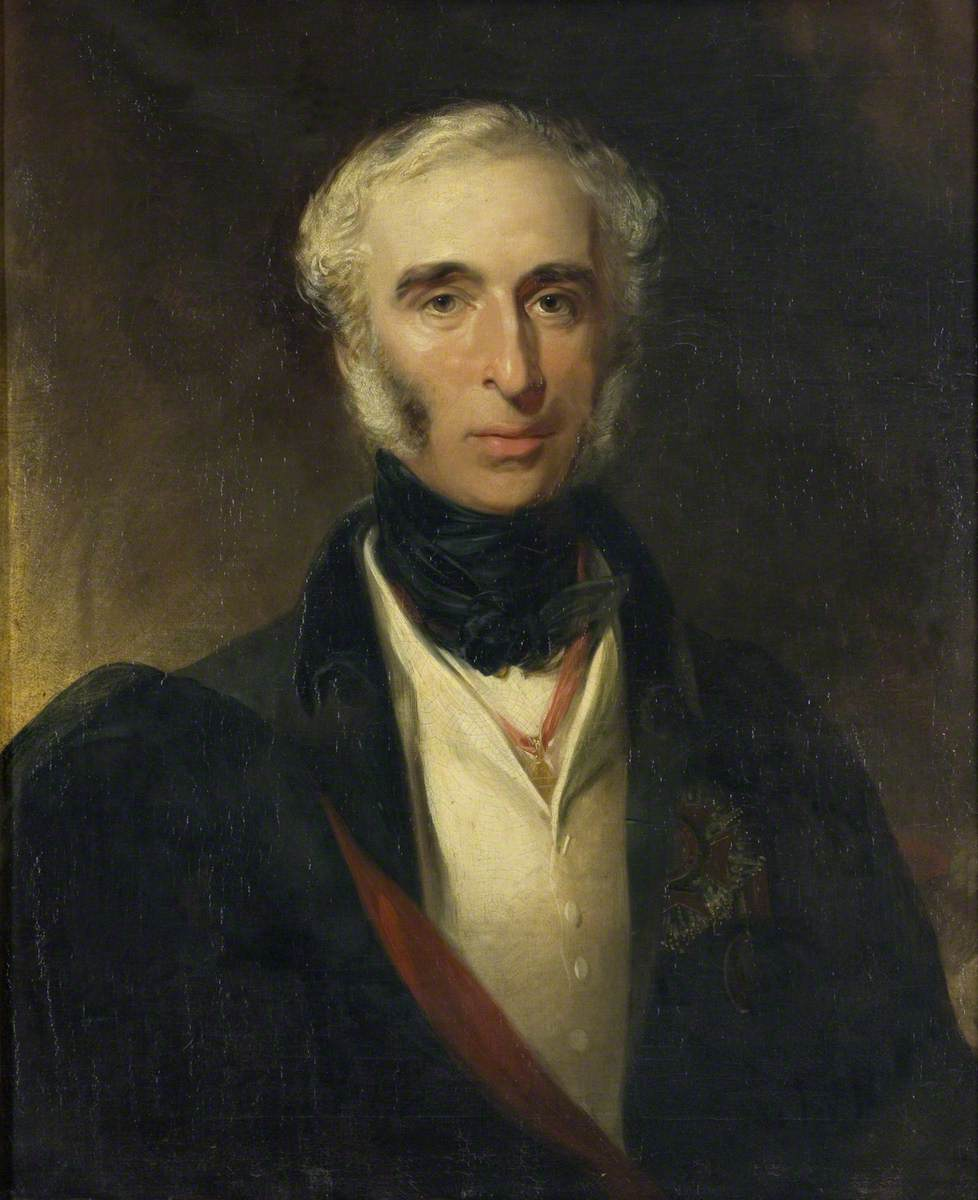
- Sir William Nott by J. Deffet Francis
- Born: 20 January 1782; Neath, Glamorgan, Wales
- Died: 1 January 1845 (aged 62); Carmarthen, Wales
- Military career
- Allegiance: East India Company
- Branch: Bengal Army
- Service years: 1798–1843
- Rank: Major-General
- Conflicts: First Anglo-Afghan War
- Awards: Knight Grand Cross of the Order of the Bath

Major-General Sir William Nott GCB (20 January 1782 – 1 January 1845) was a British military officer of the Bengal Army, East India Company in British India.

== Early life ==
Nott was born in 1782, near Neath in Wales, the second son of Charles Nott, a Herefordshire farmer of Welsh background, who in 1794 became an innkeeper of the Ivy Bush Inn at Carmarthen in Wales. Nott was educated in Neath, and then at Cowbridge Grammar School but left education after his father became an innkeeper. Nott joined the volunteer corps in 1798 and obtained a cadetship in the Indian army and went to India in 1800 when under Company rule in India it was a key component of the growing British Empire.

== Military history ==
In 1825, Nott was promoted to the command of his regiment of native infantry; and in 1838, on the outbreak of the First Afghan war, he was appointed to the command of a brigade. From April to October 1839 he was in command of the troops left at Quetta, where he rendered valuable service. In November 1840 he captured Khelat, and in the following year compelled Akbar Khan and other tribal chiefs to submit to the British.

On receiving the news of the rising of the Afghans at Kabul in November 1841, Nott took energetic measures. On 23 December the British envoy, Sir William Hay Macnaghten, was murdered at Kabul; and, in February 1842, the commander-in-chief, General Elphinstone, sent orders that Kandahar was to be evacuated. Nott at once decided to disobey, on the supposition that Elphinstone was not a free agent at Kabul; and as soon as he heard the news of the Massacre of Elphinstone's army, he urged the government at Calcutta to maintain the garrison of Kandahar with a view to avenging the massacre and the murder of Macnaghten. In March he inflicted a severe defeat on the enemy near Kandahar, and in May drove them with heavy loss out of the Baba Wali Pass.

In July, he received orders from Lord Ellenborough, the Governor-General of India, to evacuate Afghanistan, with permission to retire by Kabul. Nott arranged with Sir George Pollock, now commander-in-chief, to join him at Kabul. On 30 August he routed the Afghans at Ghazni, and on 6 September occupied the fortress, from which he carried away, by the governor-general's express instructions, the gates of the temple of Somnath; on the 17th he joined Pollock at Kabul. The combined army recrossed the Sutlej in December.

== Honours and pension ==
Nott's services were highly commended; he was immediately appointed Resident at Lucknow, was presented with a Sword of Honour, and was invested as a Knights Grand Cross of the GCB. In 1843 he returned to Britain, where the directors of the East India Company voted him a pension of £1,000 per annum (equivalent to £83,000 pa in 2008).

He died at Carmarthen on 1 January 1845, aged 62.

== Family ==
Nott was married twice. Firstly he wed Letitia Swinhoe with whom he had five children, including Charlotte, who married John Bower and was the father of Sir William Nott-Bower.

He married his second, much younger, wife in 1843. She was née Rosa Wilson Dore (died 1901), daughter of Major P. L. Dore. After her husband's death in 1845, she remarried Thomas Twisden Hodges, MP. When her second husband died in 1865 she resumed the name Lady Nott.

== Statue in Carmarthen ==
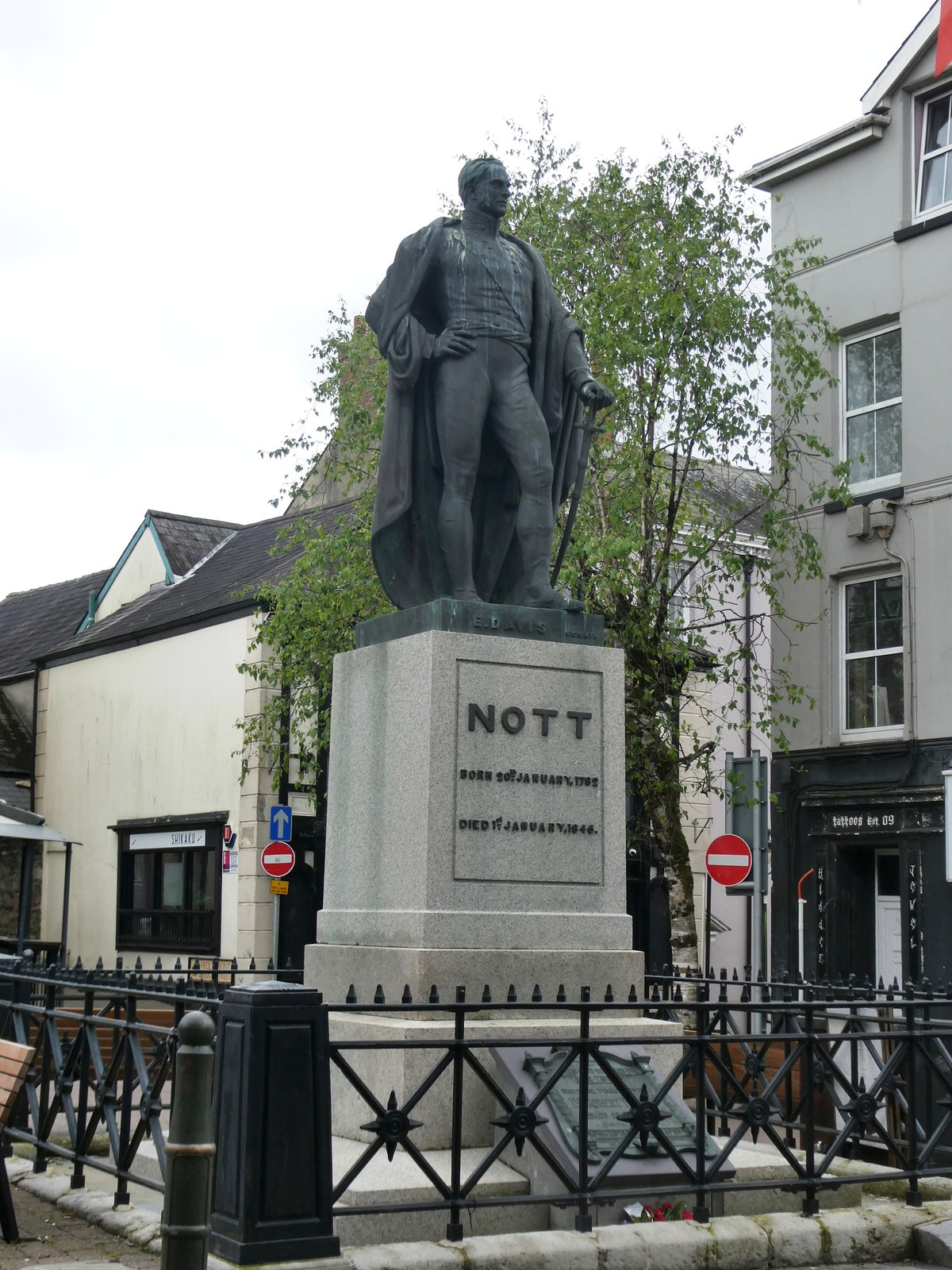
Statue in Nott Square, Carmarthen

A statue of General Nott was erected in his home town of Carmarthen in 1851. Sculpted by Edward Davis, it now has Grade II Listed status. It was based on a portrait of Nott by the painter Thomas Brigstocke, who was also born in the town. According to the PMSA, "the bronze statue was cast from cannon captured at the Battle of Maharajpur. Queen Victoria gave 200 guineas to the memorial fund. The statue occupies the site of the market cross which was dismantled when the market was resited and Nott Square created in 1846."

== Bibliography ==
- Chisholm, Hugh, ed. (1911). "Nott, Sir William" . Encyclopædia Britannica. Vol. 19 (11th ed.). Cambridge University Press. p. 824.
- Lloyd, John Edward; Jenkins, R.T. (1958). The Dictionary of Welsh Biography, Down to 1940. Cardiff: William Lewis.
