= Richard England (British Army officer, born 1793) =

British and Indian Army general (1793–1883)

General Sir Richard England GCB KH
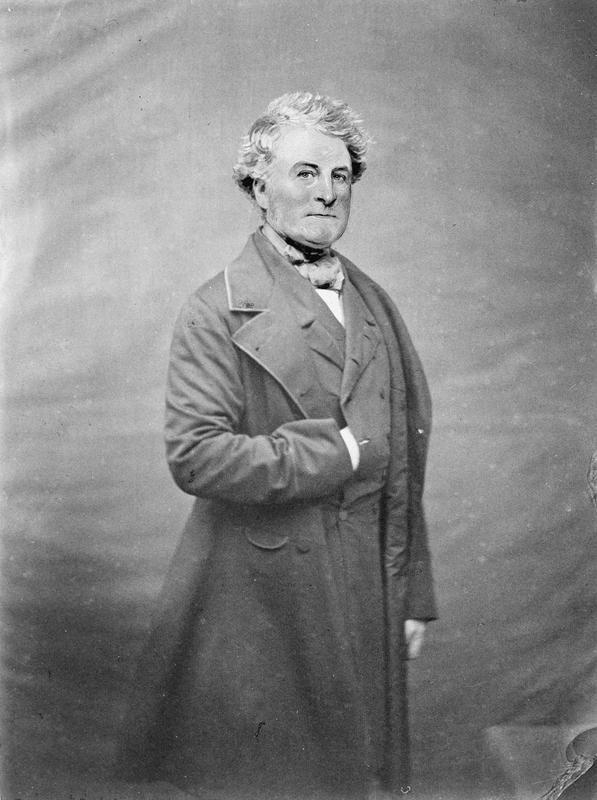
- Born: 1793; Detroit, Upper Canada, British North America
- Died: 19 January 1883 (aged 89–90); Titchfield, Hampshire, United Kingdom
- Military career
- Allegiance: United Kingdom
- Branch: British Army
- Service years: 1808–1877
- Rank: General
- Commands: 3rd Division; 41st (Welch) Regiment of Foot; 75th Regiment of Foot
- Conflicts: Napoleonic Wars; Xhosa Wars; First Anglo-Afghan War; Crimean War
- Awards: Knight Grand Cross of the Order of the Bath; Knight of the Royal Guelphic Order; Grand Officer of the Legion of Honour (France); Order of the Medjidie, First Class (Ottoman Empire)

General Sir Richard England, GCB, KH (1793 – 19 January 1883) was a British Army officer, born at Detroit, which was then part of Upper Canada. During the Napoleonic Wars he saw active service in Walcheren, Sicily, and at Waterloo, before commanding regiments and divisions in the Crimean War and in India.

== Early life and family ==
England was the son of Lieutenant General Richard G. England of Lifford, County Clare, a veteran of the War of American Independence, colonel of the 5th Regiment, lieutenant-governor of Plymouth, and one of the first colonists of Western Upper Canada, by Anne, daughter of James O'Brien of Ennistyen, a cadet of the family of the Marquess of Thomond. He was born at Fort Detroit, then part of Upper Canada, in 1793, and after being educated at Winchester College and the Royal Military College, Great Marlow, entered the army as an ensign in the 14th Regiment on 25 February 1808.

== Career ==
England was promoted to lieutenant on 1 June 1809, and served in that year in the expedition to the Walcheren and in the attack on Flushing. He was employed in the adjutant-general's department in Sicily in 1810 and 1811, and served in the defence of Tarifa as a volunteer on his way to take up his appointment. He was promoted captain into the 60th Regiment on 11 July 1811, and exchanged into the 12th on 1 January 1812. In that year he went on leave to Canada to join his father, after whose death he returned to England, married Anna Maria, sister of Sir J. C. Anderson, in 1814, and in 1815 joined his regiment at Paris after the Battle of Waterloo.

He remained in France until the withdrawal of the army of occupation in 1818, and after serving as aide-de-camp to Major General Sir Colquhoun Grant, commanding at Dublin from 1821 to 1823, he was promoted major into the 75th Regiment of Foot on 4 September 1823, and on 29 October 1825 took command of the regiment with the rank of lieutenant colonel, in the place of the Duke of Cleveland. He kept this commanded for many years and led the regiment to the Cape in 1833. On the outbreak of the Kaffir War in 1836, Lieutenant General Sir Galbraith Cole, who was then in command at the Cape, chose Colonel England to command the eastern frontier with the temporary rank of brigadier general, and he served throughout the campaigns of 1836 and 1837 in this rank. For his services he received a medal, and on 28 June 1838 was promoted full colonel.

In 1839 England was transferred to the command of the 41st (Welch) Regiment of Foot and appointed to command the Belgaum district of the Bombay Presidency with the rank of brigadier general. Immediately on his arrival he lost his wife. From this place he was summoned in 1841 to take command of the Bombay Army division despatched to the relief of Colonel Palmer at Ghuznee and General William Nott at Kandahar. He failed to reach Ghuznee in time, but, after one repulse, forced his way through the Pishín valley, and reached Kandahar in time to join Nott, and as second in command to that general assisted in the defeat of Akbar Khan on the Khojak Heights.

He remained at Kandahar till the close of 1842, when it was decided to abandon that place, and he was then placed in command of the force which retired through the Bolan Pass into Sind, while Nott marched with seven thousand picked troops on Ghuznee and Cabul. It cannot be said that England had greatly distinguished himself during these operations. Nott complained greatly of him, and though he did what he was appointed to do, and had relieved Kandahar, his operations were not considered as successful as they might have been, and he had suffered reverses, which were very like defeats, from the Balúchís both during his advance and his retreat. Nevertheless, he was made a Knight Commander of the Order of the Bath on 27 September 1843, and then threw up his command, returned home, and settled at Bath.

England remained unemployed until 1849, when he received the command of the Curragh brigade, and he was promoted major general on 11 November 1851. In 1854 the censure passed on his behaviour in Afghanistan seemed to be forgotten, and he was placed in command of the 3rd Division in the Crimean expedition. At the battle of the Alma his division was not so severely engaged as the guards or the light division; but at Inkerman England was one of the generals first upon the scene of action, and though he was never in actual command there, his promptitude in sending up his troops at the critical moment to the assistance of the hard-pressed battalions on the Inkerman Tusk greatly contributed to the success of the day.

It was during the trying winter of 1854–55 that England chiefly distinguished himself. He suffered the greatest privations with his troops, but yet he never applied to come home and was the last of the original general officers who had accompanied the army to the Crimea to leave it. Before he did return, he directed the attack on the Redan on 18 June 1855, and it was not his fault that the result of that day's hard fighting was not a great success. In August 1855 he was, however, obliged to obey the doctor's orders and return to England. For his services he was promoted lieutenant general, and appointed a Knight Grand Cross of the Order of the Bath, a grand officer of the Grand Officer of the Legion of Honour, and a knight of the first class of the Order of the Medjidie. England never again saw active service. He was made colonel of the 50th (Queen's Own) Regiment in 1854 and transferred as colonel to the 41st Regiment of Foot on 20 April 1861. he was promoted full general on 6 July 1863, and placed on the retired list in 1877.

He died at St. Margaret's, Titchfield, Hampshire, on 19 January 1883.
