= William Hay Macnaghten =

British civil servant (1793–1841)

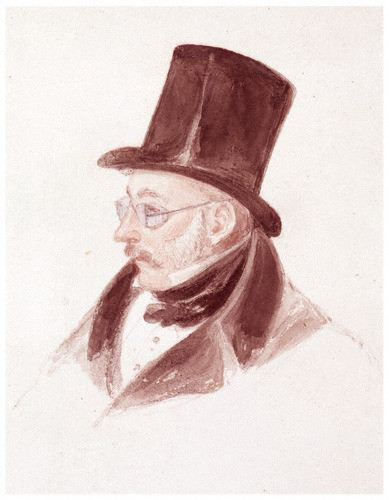
A painting commissioned in the last year of Macnaghten's life, by James Atkinson

Sir William Hay Macnaghten, 1st Baronet (24 August 1793 – 23 December 1841), was a British civil servant in India, who played a major part in the First Anglo-Afghan War. He was also briefly appointed the governor of the Bombay Presidency, but he was unable to assume his post, having been killed by Wazir Akbar Khan in Afghanistan.

== Life ==
William was the second son of Sir Francis Macnaghten, 1st Baronet, judge of the supreme courts of Madras and Calcutta, and was educated at Charterhouse. He went to Madras as a cadet in 1809, but in 1816 joined the Bengal Civil Service. He displayed a talent for languages and published several treatises on Hindu and Islamic law. His political career began in 1830 as secretary to Lord William Bentinck; and, in 1837, he became one of the most trusted advisers of the governor-general, Lord Auckland, with whose policy of supporting Shah Shujah against Dost Mahommed Khan, the reigning Amir of Kabul, Macnaghten became closely identified.

He was created a baronet in 1840, and four months before his death was nominated to the governorship of Bombay.

As the British Envoy and Political Agent in Kabul, he came into conflict with the British military authorities and subsequently with his subordinate Sir Alexander Burnes. Macnaghten attempted to placate the Afghan chiefs with heavy subsidies, but when the drain on the Indian exchequer became too great, and the allowances were reduced, this policy precipitated a disastrous collapse in relations between the British and Afghans. Burnes was murdered on 2 November 1841; and under the elderly General William Elphinstone, who was also injured in a bad fall from his horse, the morale and confidence of the British/Indian army in Kabul drastically deteriorated.

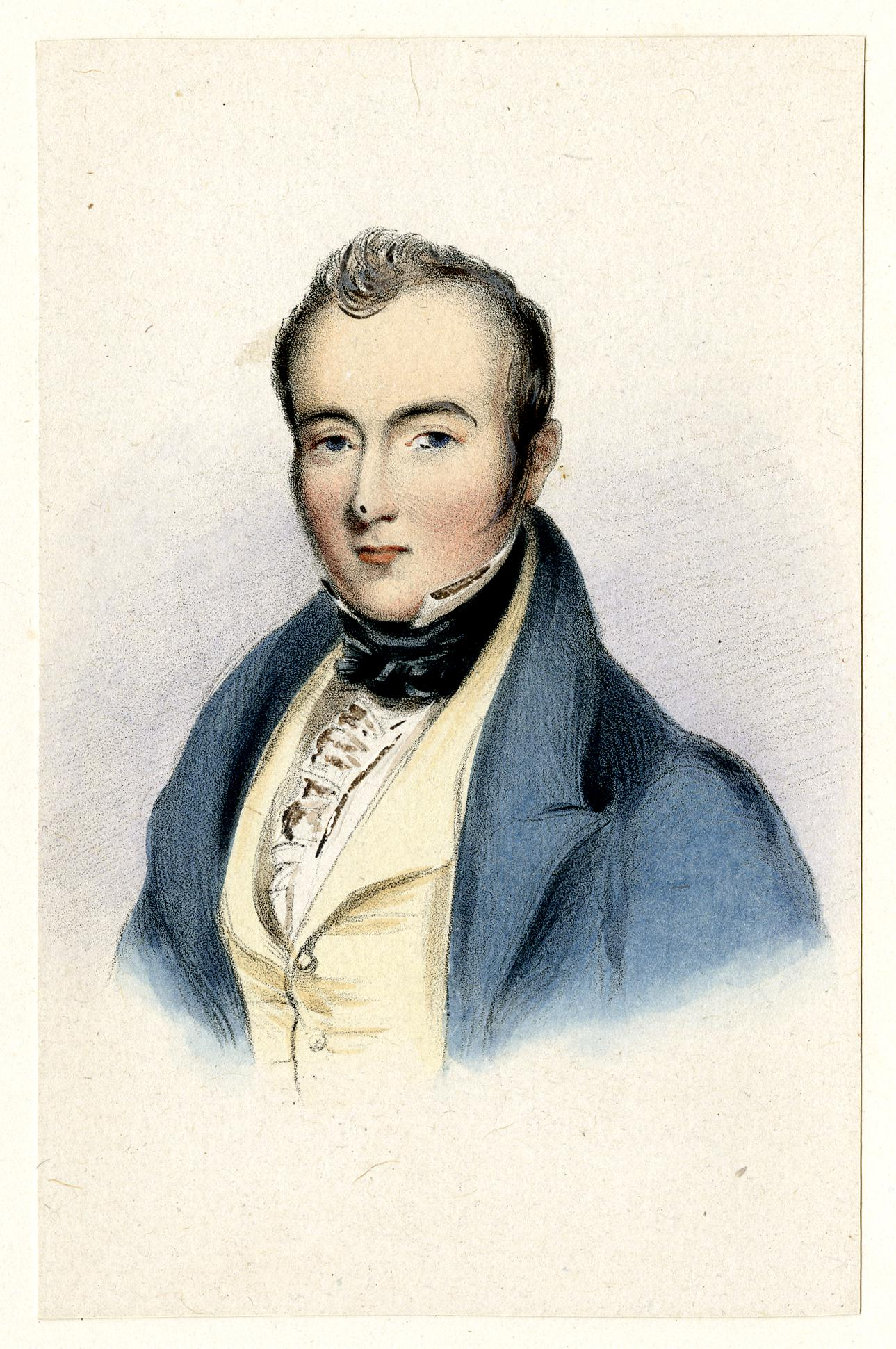
Portrait of Macnaghten from Prison Sketches. Comprising portraits of the Kabul prisoners, and other subjects by Vincent Eyre

Macnaghten tried to save the situation by negotiating with the Afghan chiefs and, independently of them, with Dost Mahammad's son, Wazir Akbar Khan. At a meeting with Wazir Akbar Khan outside Kabul on 23 December 1841, Macnaghten presented Wazir Akbar Khan with a fine pair of pistols as a gesture of friendship and good faith. However, Wazir Akbar Khan murdered Macnaghten on the spot. The exact circumstances of his death are unclear. Wazir Akbar Khan may have killed Macnaghten with one of the very pistols that he had just been gifted by Macnaghten, or Macnaghten may have been killed because he was resisting after being captured and it was feared he would break free. The former account is more likely to be true.

The eviction of the British army soon became an inspirational story among the Afghans, with the disastrous retreat from Kabul and the Massacre of Elphinstone's army in the Khurd-Kabul Pass following. The entire calamitous episode cast the gravest doubt on Macnaghten's capacity for dealing with the problems of imperial diplomacy.

== Works ==
Macnaghten produced one of the principal editions of the Thousand and One Nights, known as the Calcutta II edition.

== Appearances in fiction ==
Macnaghten appears in the first volume of the Flashman Papers, being depicted as ambitious, arrogant and a megalomaniac.

He also appears in To Herat and Kabul by G. A. Henty. He is pictured as a brave man, but clueless about Afghan politics. Henty places the blame for convincing Lord Auckland, the Governor-General of India, to place Shuja on the throne squarely on his shoulders.

Baronetage of the United Kingdom
New creation	Baronet; 1840–1841	Extinct
