= William George Keith Elphinstone =

British Army general (1782–1842)

Major-General William George Keith Elphinstone CB
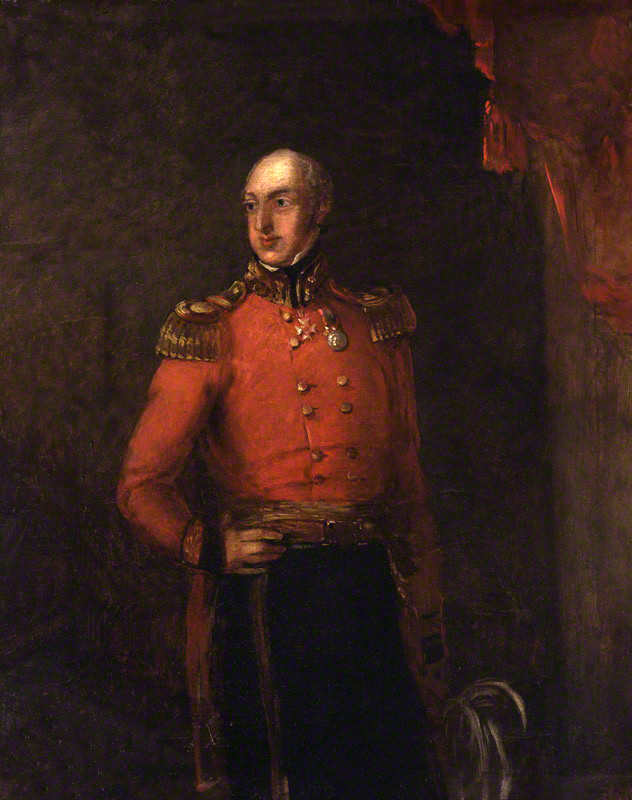
- Portrait, 1836–1839
- Born: 26 January 1782; Scotland
- Died: 23 April 1842 (aged 60); Afghanistan
- Military career
- Branch: British Army
- Service years: 1804–1842
- Rank: Major-General
- Commands: 33rd Regiment of Foot; Kabul garrison
- Conflicts: Napoleonic Wars; First Anglo-Afghan War

Major-General William George Keith Elphinstone CB (26 January 1782 – 23 April 1842) was a Scottish officer of the British Army during the 19th century, remembered for service in the highest and lowest actions of the British Army. Elphinstone commanded the 33rd Foot at the Battle of Waterloo, and the British force at Kabul during the First Anglo-Afghan War.

== Biography ==
=== Early life and military career ===
He was born in Scotland in 1782, the son of William Fullerton-Elphinstone, who was a director of the East India Company, and nephew of Admiral George Keith Elphinstone, 1st Viscount Keith.

Elphinstone entered the British Army in 1804 as a lieutenant; he saw service throughout the Napoleonic Wars, rising to the rank of lieutenant-colonel by 1813, when he became commander of the 33rd Regiment of Foot, which he led at the Battle of Waterloo in 1815. For his actions at Waterloo, Elphinstone was made a Companion of the Bath, as well as a knight of the Dutch Military Order of William and of the Russian Order of Saint Anna 2nd class (6–18 August 1815). He left the regiment in 1822. After Elphinstone was promoted to colonel in 1825, he served for a time as aide-de-camp to King George IV.

In 1837 Elphinstone was effectively retired, as a long term half-pay officer who had not seen active-service since Waterloo. His increasing debts however led him to seek re-employment in the army.

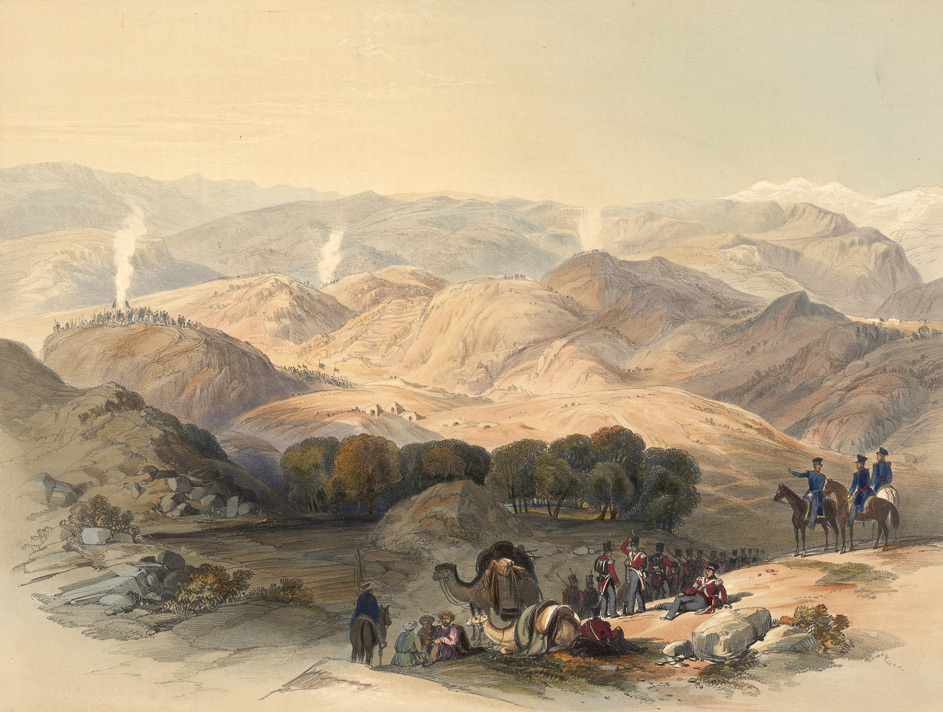
The grove and valley of Jugdulluk where Elphinstone's Army made its last stand in the calamitous retreat; January 1842. As drawn on the spot by James Rattray.

=== First Anglo-Afghan War ===
Elphinstone was promoted to major-general in 1837. In 1840 he was, under the patronage of FitzRoy Somerset, Lord Raglan, appointed to command the British Army then occupying Kabul during the First Anglo-Afghan War. In Britain he had been socially acquainted with George Eden, Earl of Auckland and Governor-General of India. Eden had approved Elphinstone's appointment but was disturbed to discover that his state of health had markedly declined. In addition Elphinstone had no understanding of his new environment and appeared prejudiced against the Indian sepoys whom he was to command.

Confirmed in his appointment in December 1840, Elphinstone took command of the British garrison in Kabul, Afghanistan, numbering around 4,500 troops, of whom 690 were European and the rest Indian. The garrison also included 12,000 civilians, including soldiers' families and camp followers. He was elderly, indecisive, weak, and unwell, and proved himself utterly incompetent for the post. The leadership of Elphinstone is seen as a notorious example of how the ineptitude and indecisiveness of a senior officer could compromise the morale and effectiveness of a whole army (though already much depleted). Elphinstone completely failed to lead his soldiers, but fatally exerted enough authority to prevent any of his officers from exercising proper command in his place. His entire command was massacred during the British retreat from Kabul during January 1842.

=== Death ===
Elphinstone died as a captive in Afghanistan some months later. Present at his death was the Military Secretary George Lawrence, who while under no illusions as to Elphinstone's unsuitability for his command, commented "His kind, mild disposition and courteous detachment had made him esteemed by us all".

Elphinstone's body was dispatched with a small guard of Afghan soldiers to the British garrison at Jalalabad. Elphinstone's "faithful" batman Moore who had stayed with the General accompanied the body. En route, they were attacked by a band of tribesmen who stripped and abused the corpse until it was rescued by horsemen sent by the Afghan leader Akbar Khan. Eventually the body and Moore reached the garrison. Elphinstone was buried with military honours but in an unmarked grave, before the British finally abandoned the fortress.

== See also ==
- Flashman
