= Ottoman weapons =

Overview of weapons used in the Ottoman Empire

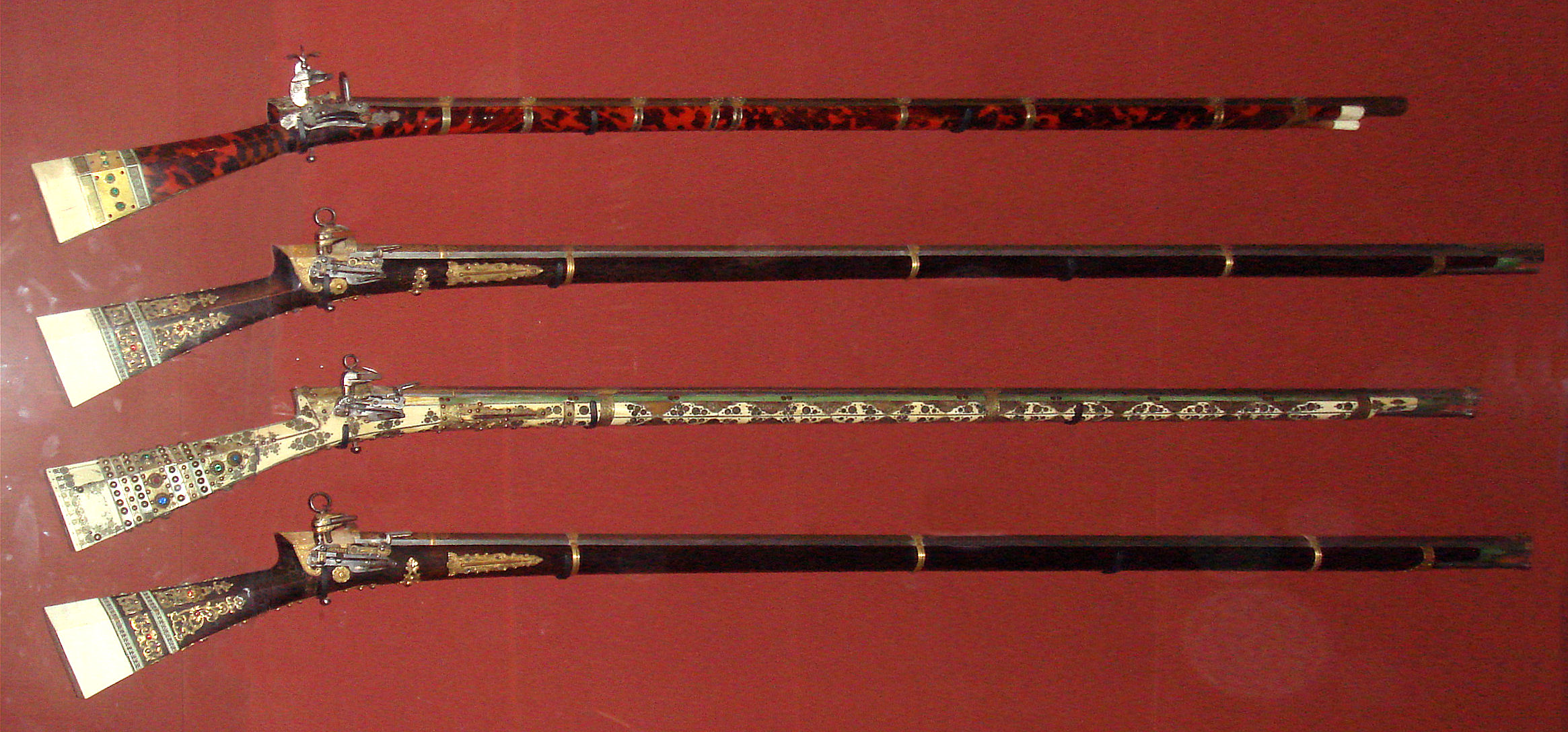
Shishane with miquelet locks, 1750-1800. Army Museum, Paris.

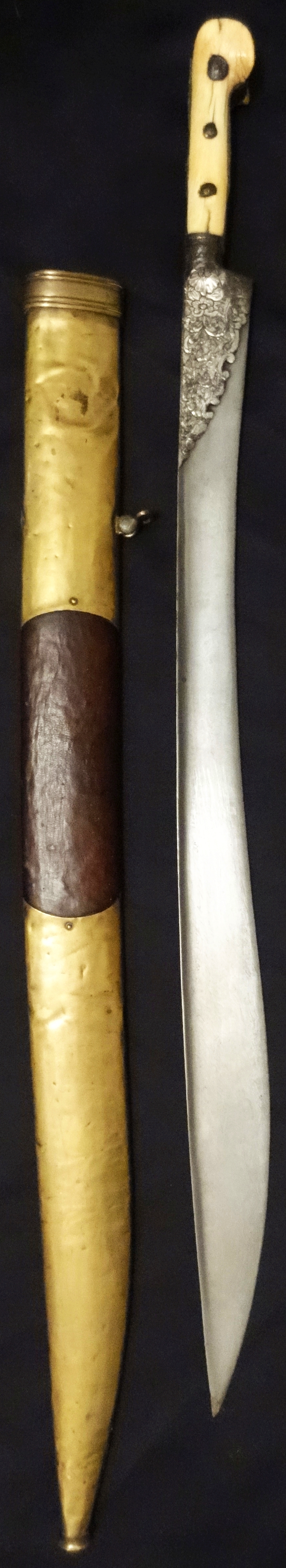
Yatağan (Ottoman long knife or sabre)

Military forces of the Ottoman Empire used a variety of weapons throughout the centuries. The armoury in Topkapı Palace has a large collection showing select items.

== Yatagan ==
The Yatagan (yatağan) makes its appearance in the second half of the 16th century, and is an infantry weapon in which the hilt is generally made of bone or ivory and the pommel is flared. Its short, slightly curved blade is sharp on one edge and comes to a fine point. This form continues unchanged until the end of the 19th century. The yatagan sword was widely used in both the Ottoman army and navy especially for the Janissaries as they were signature weapon for the corps.

== Kilij ==
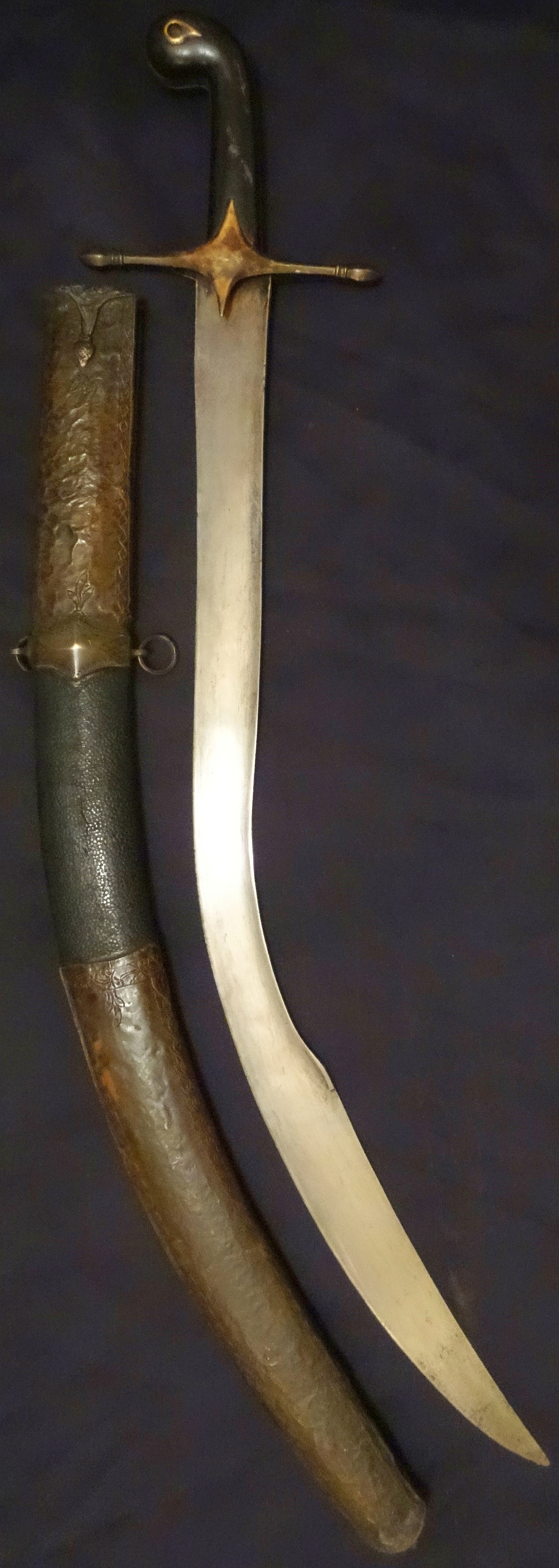
Kilij

The Ottoman cavalry sabre, or kilij (Ottoman Turkish: قلج, romanized: kılıc, Ottoman Turkish pronunciation: [/cɯlɯtʃ/]), is the Ottoman variant of the Turko-Mongol sabres originating in Central Asia. It was designed for mounted close combat, which was preferred by Turkish and Mamluke troops. It was a one-handed saber with a slight curvature enough to cut and thrust effectively. The sharpened back edge at the final section of the blade, known as the salman, was specific to the kilij.

A kilij consists of a grooved blade, a hilt, a guard, and a scabbard. The sword of Sultan Mehmed II illustrates its basic form with its slightly curved blade that thickens at the back. During the reigns of the sultans Bayezid II and Suleiman the Magnificent, the kilij attained its classic form, becoming shorter, lighter, and straighter.

== Bow ==
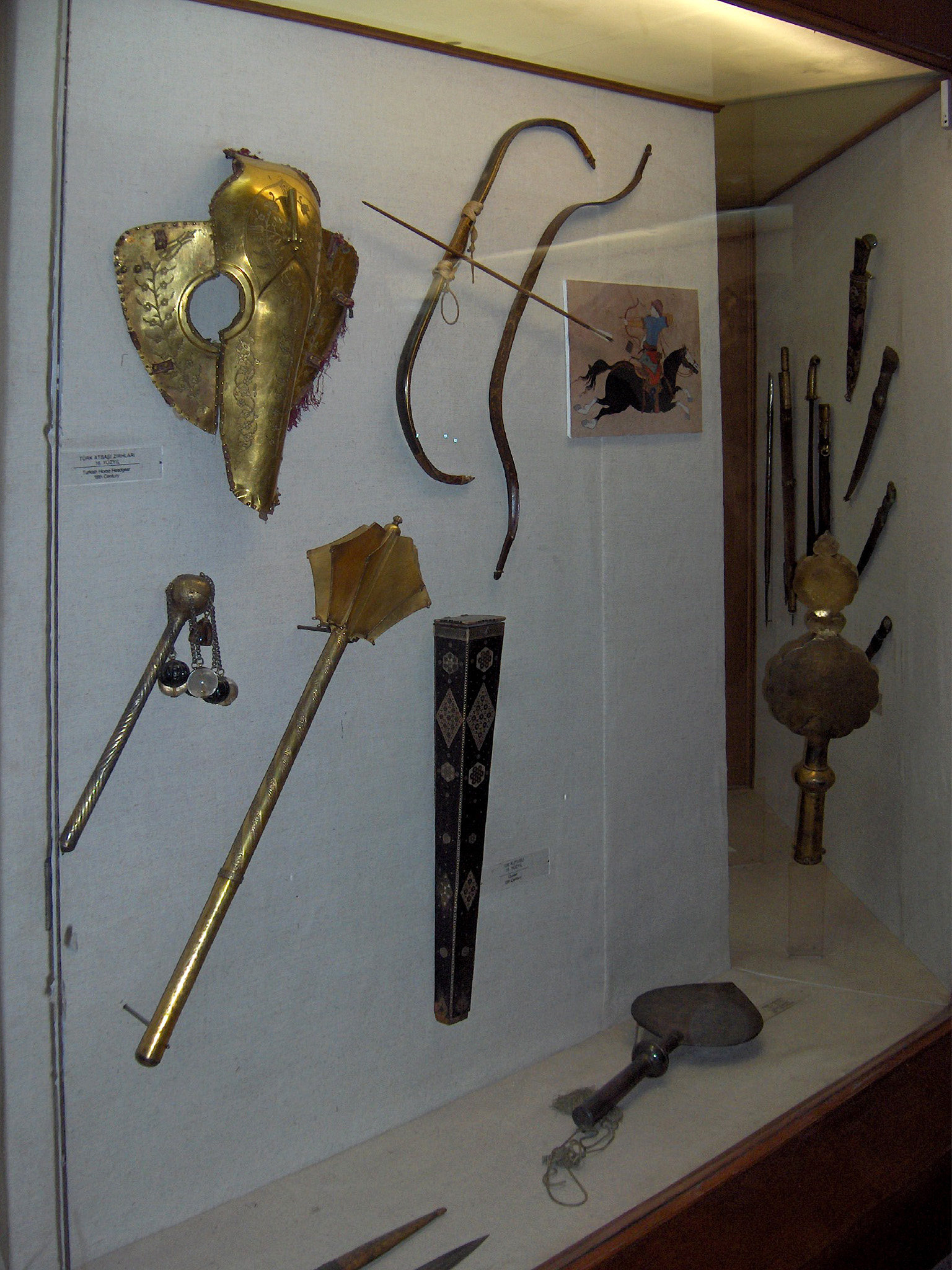
Bows and arrows and maces

There are three kinds of recurve bow : war (tirkeş), target (puta), and long-range (menzil) bows. All three types were made of four materials: wood, horn, tendon and adhesive. A grip (kabza) is located at the center of each bow. They are generally decorated in lacquer technique.

The shaft of arrows was made of pine and the head of iron, brass, or bone. At the end of the arrow are feathers (telek) to stabilise flight and knotted nock (gez) to hold the arrow firmly against the bowstring.

== Mace ==
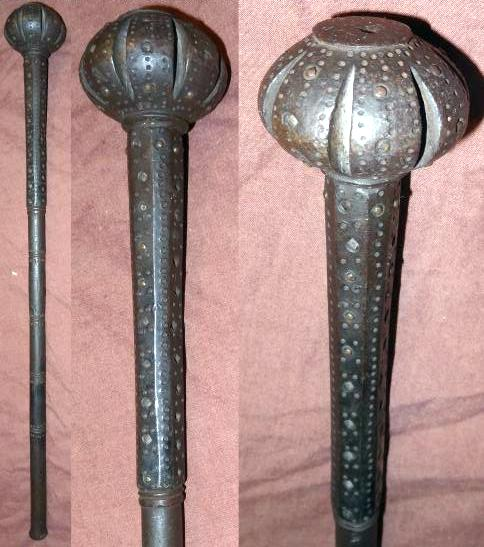
Ottoman style flanged mace

Maces were blunt force weapons used for crushing blows against the enemy. These weapons were effective against armored troops, and typically were smooth or had 3-12 flanges or blades protruding from the top of the weapon.

== Firearms ==
Shishana, Kariophili, Kubur on a Silahlik, Tançica, & a Boyliya

=== Shishane ===
Standard musket used across the empire from the 16th-19th centuries, making the leap from matchlock to miquelet.

=== Džeferdar ===
An ornate musket from the Bay of Kotor region, renowned for its stock profusely inlaid with mother-of-pearl.

=== Tançica ===
Balkan musket, easily identified by its full metal-covered stock and uniquely shaped butt, primarily attributed to Albanian gunsmithing traditions.

=== Kariofili ===
Flintlock musket from Greece, symbolic of the klephts and armatoles, easily recognized by its brass covered upward-curving stock that terminates in a distinctive fishtail butt.

=== Boyliya ===
Bulgarian musket featuring a unique miquelet lock sheathed in brass and a stock adorned with intricate inlay and silverwork.

== Artillery ==
=== Origins ===
The start of the use of artillery in the Ottoman Army is not very definite. Date estimates on when artillery entered Ottoman service vary, as most of the early history on Ottoman artillery was written in the late 15th century, long after the actual battles. One of the arguments is that the Ottomans used cannons in the Battle of Kosovo (1389) and Nukap (1396) and most certainly by the 1420s. However the other argument states that field guns entered service shortly after the Battle of Varna (1444) and more certainly used in the Second Battle of Kosovo (1448).

The Balkans were used by the Ottomans as both a human and technical source concerning the advancement and the use of their artillery pieces. Bosnia and Serbia particularly, along with Italy and Germany, were significant for the Ottoman Army. Specialist ‘topcu’ or artillery units were formed mainly of Christians; units such as tayfa-i efreciye . In the siege of Baghdad where the Ottomans retook the city from the Persians (1638), gunners of European descent served on the lines. Although the payroll registry records were not good at keeping up with the number of gunners because the comrades of those deceased collected the money on their behalf. The table below gives us a clear view of the trends.

The Size of the Ottoman Artillery Corps 1514-1769

Date	1514	1527	1567	1574	1598	1609	1660	1669	1687	1699	1702	1739	1769
Gunners	348	695	1204	1099	2827	1552	2026	2793	4949	4604	1269	7279	1351
Artillery Carts	372	943	678	400	700	684	282	432	670	1074	470	2274	180
Weapons Smith	451	524	789	625	3000	5730	4180	4789	3503	9629	2462	9877	3691
Total	1171	2162	2671	2124	6527	7960	6488	8014	9122	15307	4201	19430	5222

One of the greatest advancements in Ottoman fire arms came in the reign of Beyazid II who improved the design of field artillery pieces and many other firearms ranging from muskets to ‘tufeks’. To add to this the 16th century brought the latest technical advancements in gun making to the Ottomans; in the form of Jews fleeing from the Spanish Inquisition.

=== Types ===
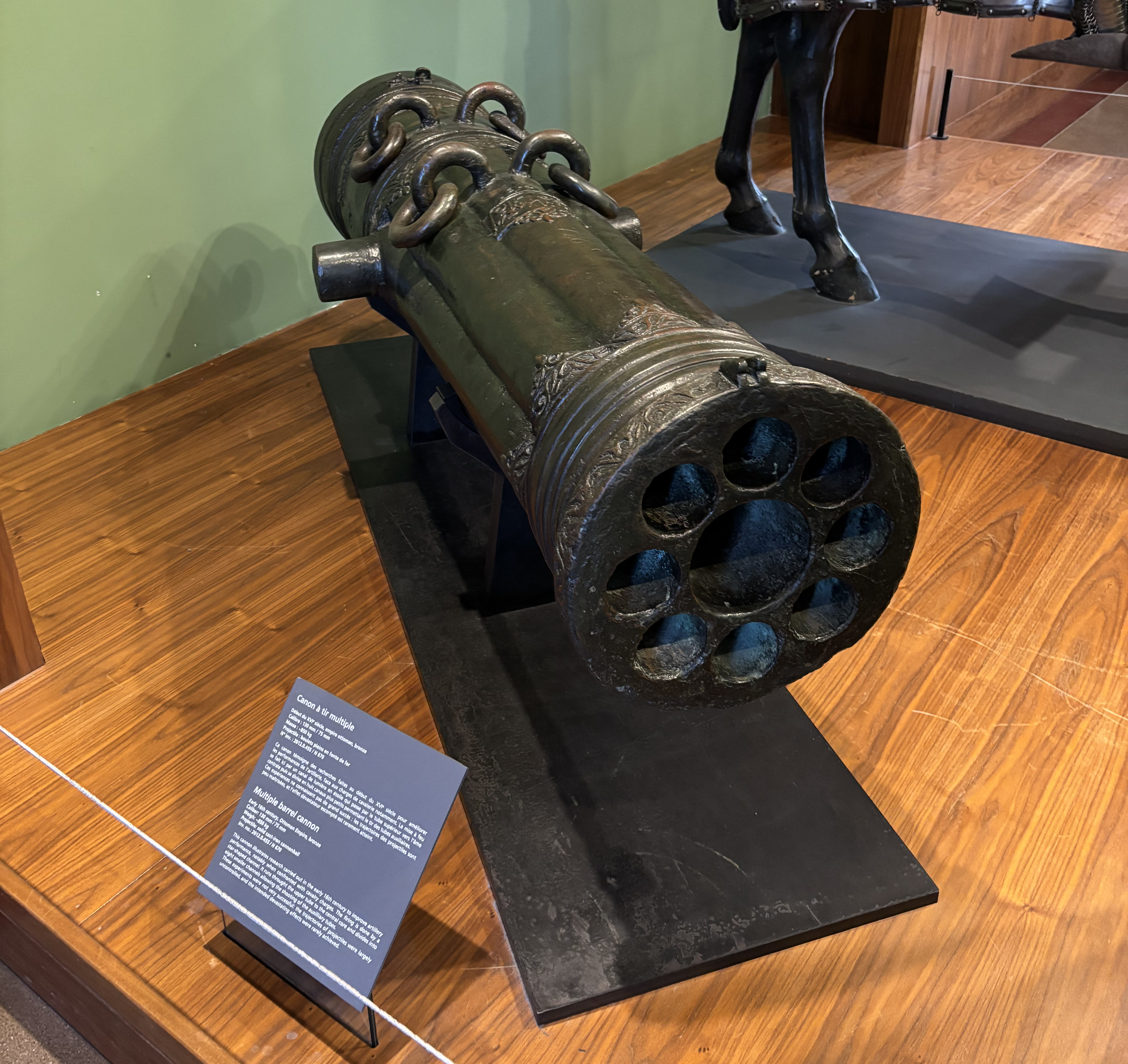
Early 16th-century Ottoman volley gun

Archival evidence supports the notion that the Ottoman artillery was famous for the size of its cannon and their number, from the highly mobile antipersonnel Abus gun to the massive Dardanelles Gun (the Şahi). These bombards were a product of specialised study in the production of 'giant guns' known literally as castle smashers 'kale-kob'. Although such weapons being primarily used in sieges; where they were cast on site due to the logistical difficulties attributed to transport them there, they were used as late as 1809 when massive stone-firing guns were used with some effect against British ships during the Dardanelles Operation, throwing 1000-1,000 lb (450 kg) marble with a range of 1 mi (1.6 km). Accuracy was achieved using wadded shots wrapped in sheepskin with ready-measured powder stacks. Unlike the European powder, the Ottoman powder is thought to be better for upon firing; it produced white smoke rather than black smoke.

The most famous battle in which these bronze 'bombards' were used is at the siege of Constantinople in 1453. The bombards weighed 19 tons, took 200 men and sixty oxen to emplace, and could fire just seven times a day. The Fall of Constantinople was perhaps "the first event of supreme importance whose result was determined by the use of artillery", when the huge bronze cannons of Mehmed II breached the city's walls, ending the Byzantine Empire, according to Sir Charles Oman.

The most commonly used gun was a battering gun or darbzen. This gun fired 0.15–2.5 kg (0.33–5.51 lb) shots in weight. These guns were used more in fortresses as the emphasis was given to small to medium-calibre guns. Small-calibre bronze pieces were also used on galleons and river boats; they weighed between 3.7–8.6 kg (8.2–19.0 lb). However, most riverboats had an armoury of cast-iron guns which fired 0.5 kg (1.1 lb) shots; on average they weighed between 20–40 kg (44–88 lb). The ‘balyemez’ was a medium-weight, long-range cannon which fired shots weighing 31–74 kg (68–163 lb). Şahalaz was a light cannon mainly used on riverboats, and was a cast-iron cannon firing 0.5 kg (1.1 lb) shots. The şayha was a gun of various sizes used predominantly on riverboats in the Danube. It weighed between 31–74 kg (68–163 lb). The 16th and 17th centuries gave rise to other types of cannons which the Ottomans used, such as the saçma topu grapeshot and the ağaç topu or petard.

=== Method and production ===
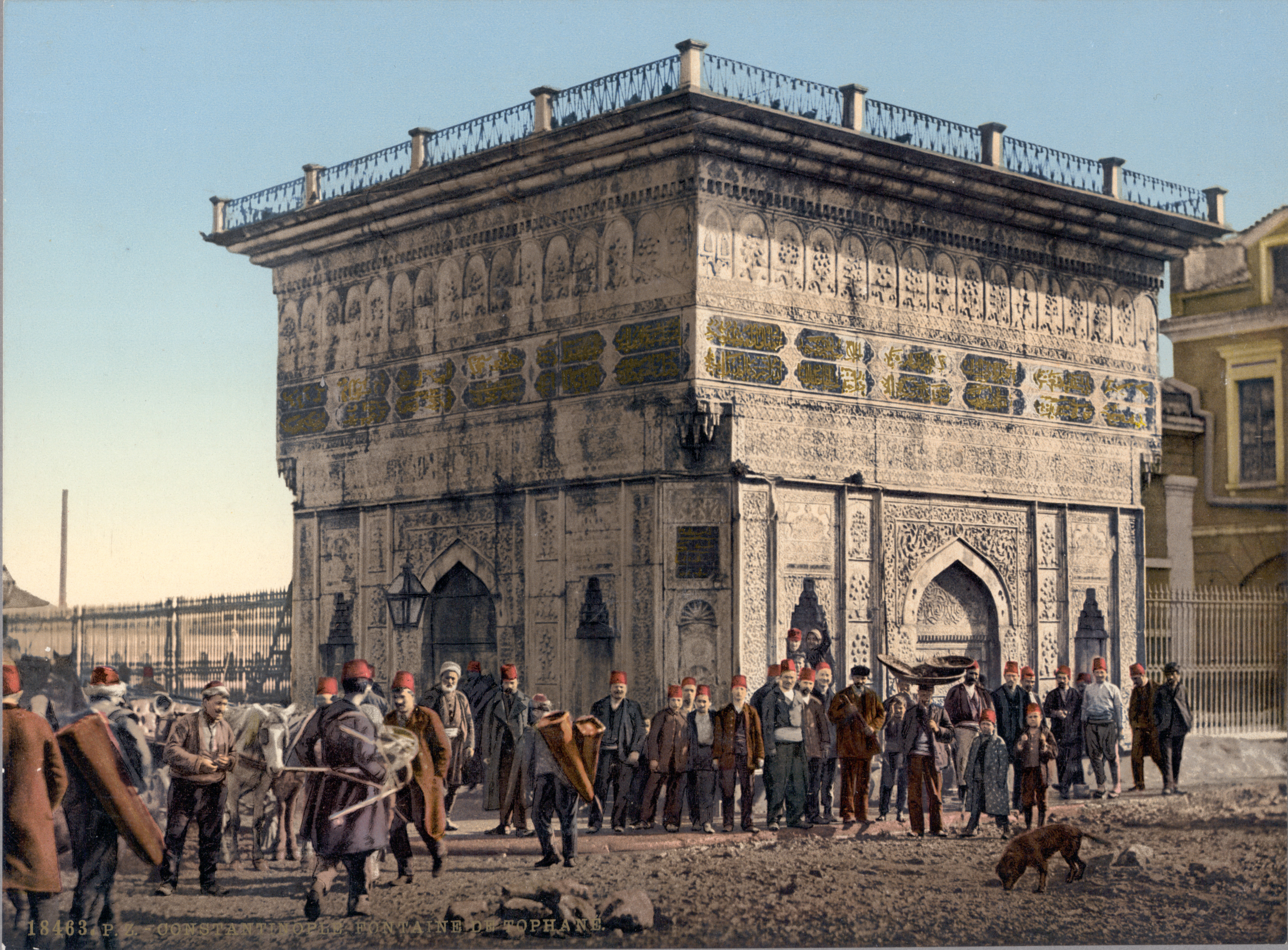
Tophane, 1890s.

The ammunition used by the bronze bombards were stone balls 1 m (3 ft 3 in) in diameter and weighing 400 kg (880 lb). The transportation of just two bombards proved to be a logistically challenging task. They were dragged to the siege of Constantinople by 70 oxen and 1000 men. The casting of these bombards are described by Kritoboulos 1467. He describes the clay mould and the core which was strengthened by iron, wood, earth and stone. 45 t (44 long tons; 50 short tons) of copper and tin are said to be placed in two furnaces constructed out of large stone blocks, laid with cement and covered by fire bricks and smeared in clay. Logs of wood along with charcoal are placed inside the furnace and all the holes except the tapping channels are closed. Then bellows are put to work until the metal inside is in a fluid state. The liquid bronze is then poured into the clay mould where it is then chiseled and polished.

Mehmed II erected many cannon-foundries in Istanbul, the most famous of which is the Tophane foundry which produced bronze cannons for siege warfare. It made large bombards which had a diameter of 60–100 cm (24–39 in) and in 1562 alone it cast a total of 1012 guns weighing all together 481 t (473 long tons; 530 short tons).

=== Artillery gallery ===
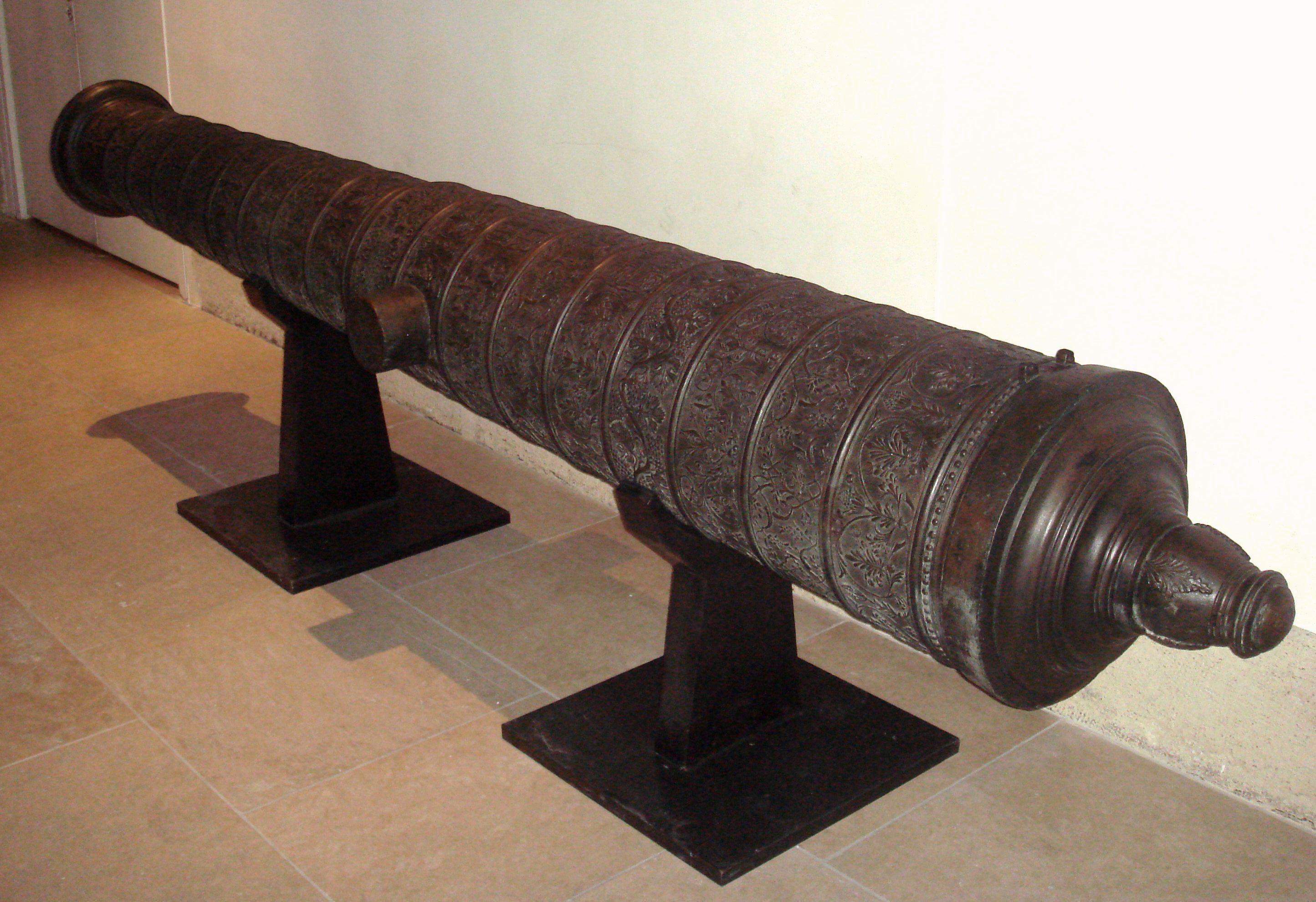
Length: 385 cm (152 in);– Calibre: 178 mm (7.0 in);– Weight: 2,910 kg (6,420 lb);– Projectile: Stone – Forged: In Alger 1581

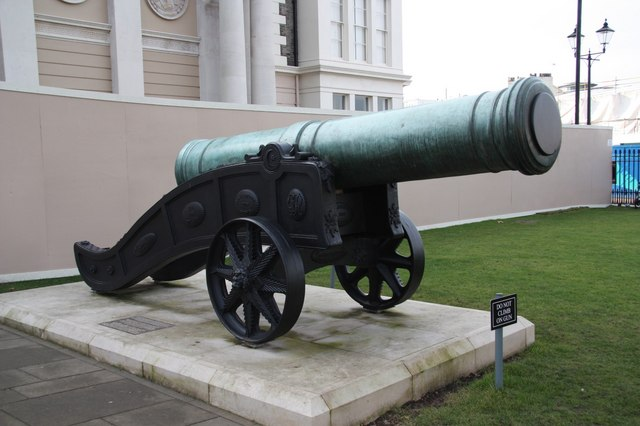
Type: Ottoman Bronze – Cast Date: 1790–91 – Weight 5.2 t (5.1 long tons; 5.7 short tons);– Shot Fired: Stone shot of over 56 kg (123 lb).

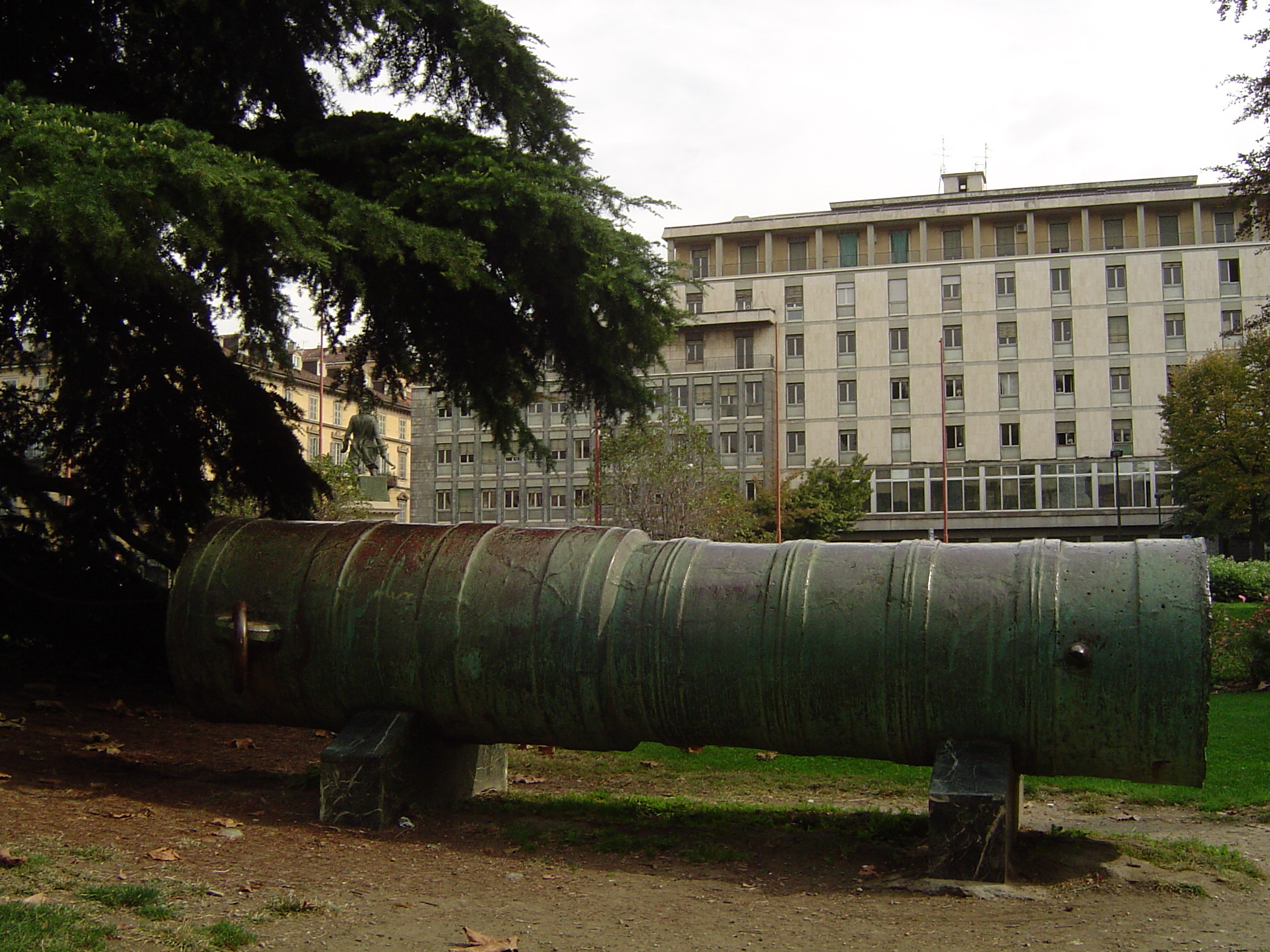
Bronze cast Ottoman bombard – Cast in the 15th–16th century – Fired shots of 1,000 lb (450 kg)

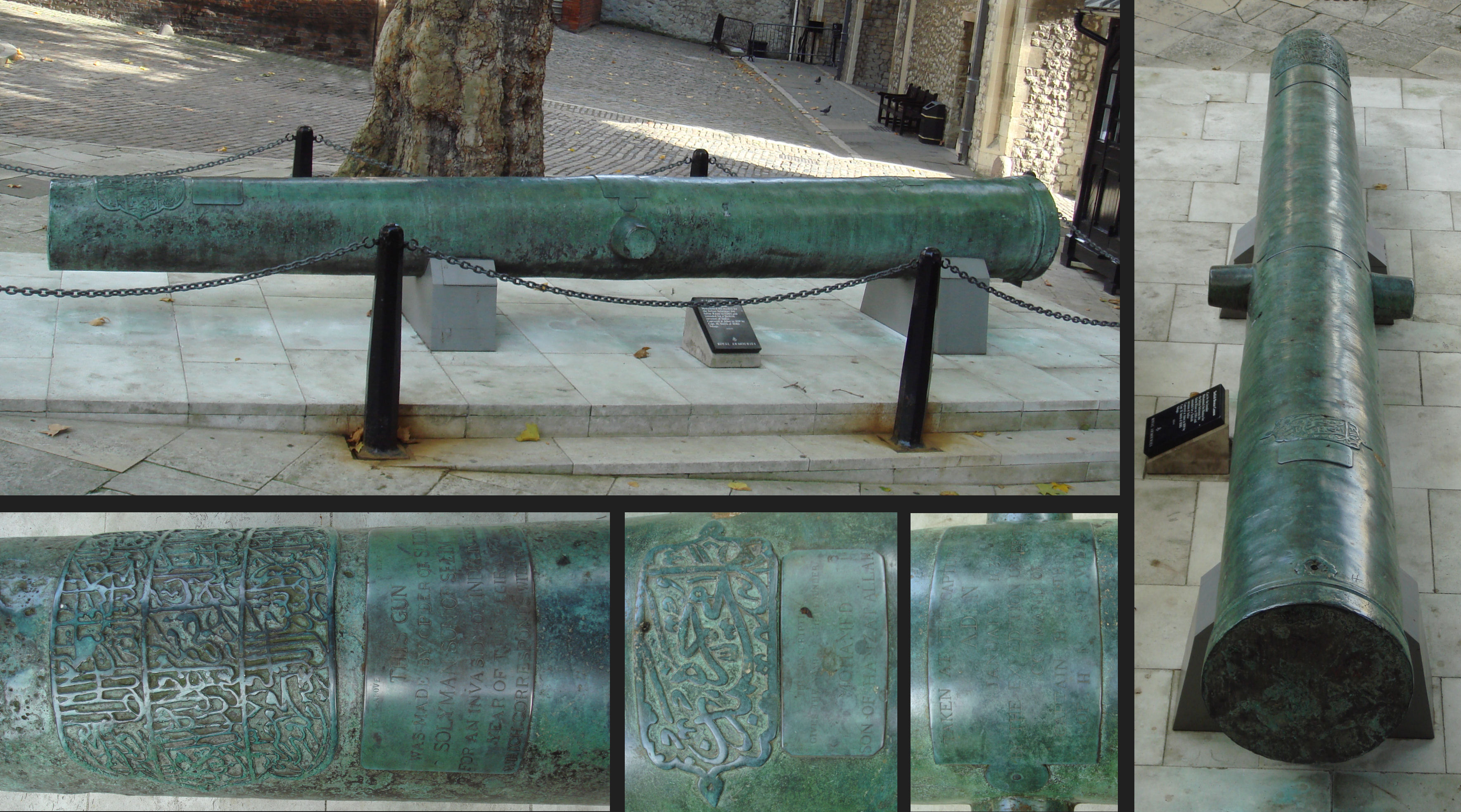
Cannon batteries at the Siege of Esztergom 1543

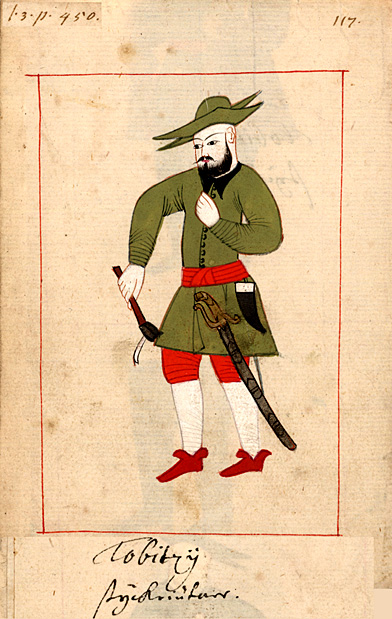
Miniature of an Ottoman gunner

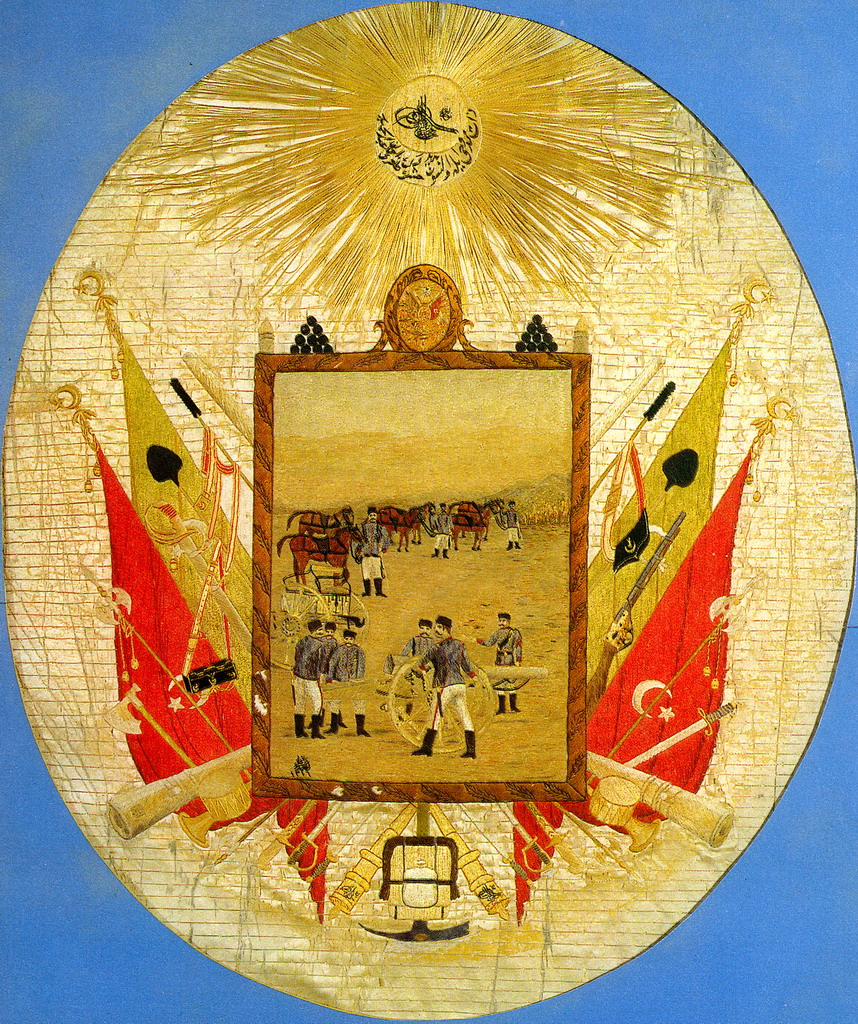
Ottoman gunner badge

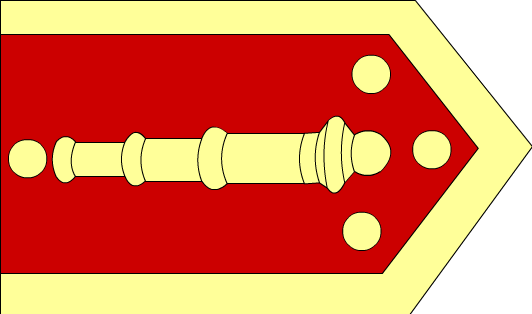
Ottoman artillery unit banner

== See also ==
- Plated mail
- Mirror armour
- Ottoman Empire
- Mughal weapons
- Kubur
- Shishane
- Ottoman matchlock musket
- Yatagan
- Horseman's pick
- Sword of Osman
- Tançica

== Literature ==
- David Nicolle. Armies of the Ottoman Empire 1775-1820 (Men-At-Arms, No 314). Osprey Publishing (1998). ISBN 1-85532-697-3
- Gábor Ágoston. Guns for the Sultan: Military Power and the Weapons Industry in the Ottoman Empire. Cambridge Studies in Islamic Civilization. Cambridge University Press (2005). ISBN 0-521-84313-8
- DK Publishing. Weapon: A Visual History of Arms and Armor. DK ADULT (2006). ISBN 0-7566-2210-7
- Judith Herbst. The History Of Weapons (Major Inventions Through History). Twenty-First Century Books (CT) (2005) ISBN 0-8225-3805-9
- Fanny Davis. Palace of Topkapi in Istanbul. 1970. ASIN B000NP64Z2
