= Serpentine lock =

Mechanism in early firearms

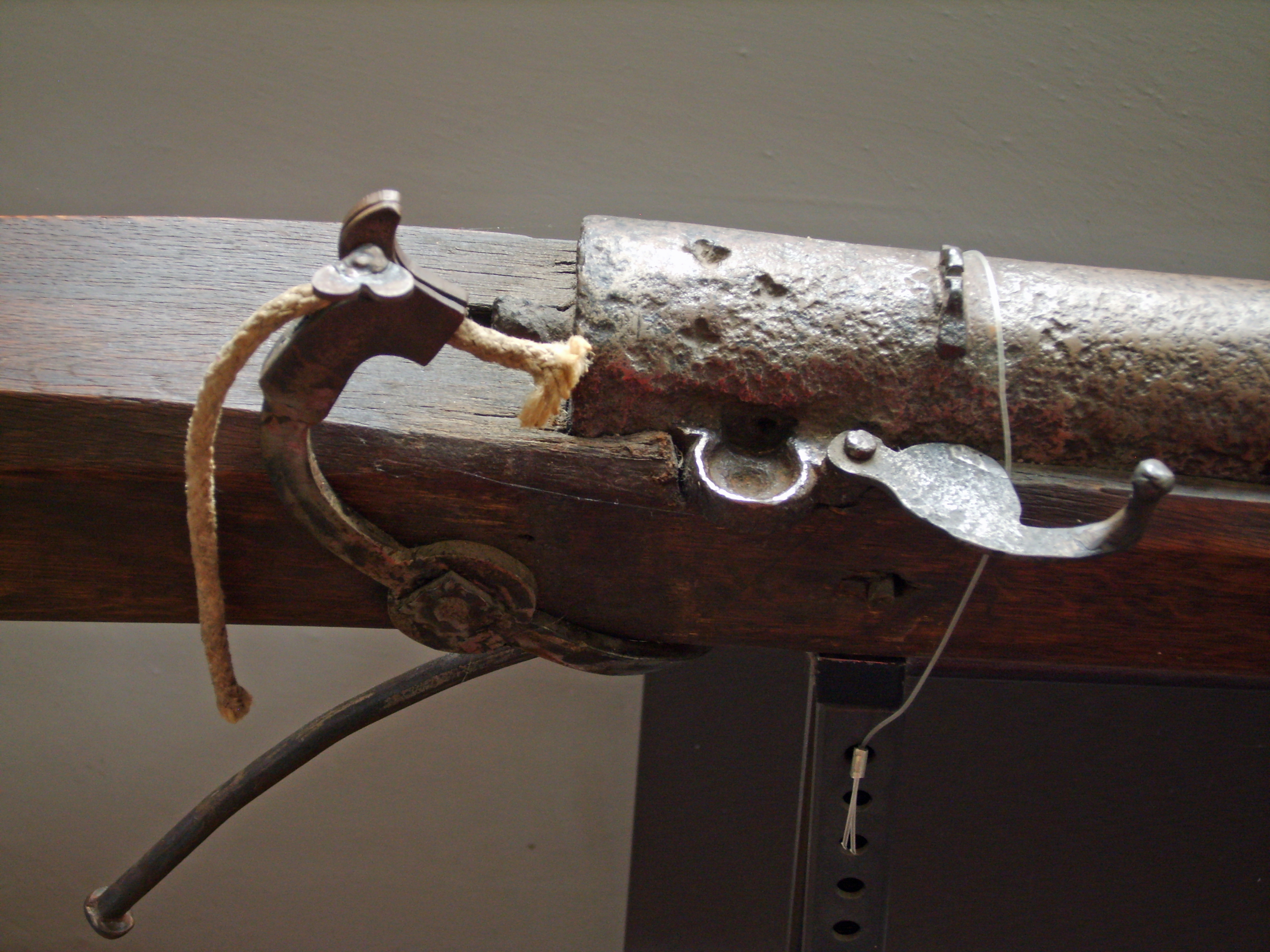
A serpentine lock mechanism on a German arquebus (early 16th century).

Serpentine lock (Latin: serpens, literally serpent-like), the earliest lock mechanism developed for the early firearms in the first half of the 15th century. The simplest form of matchlock, used on early arquebuses and (after 1520) muskets.

== History ==
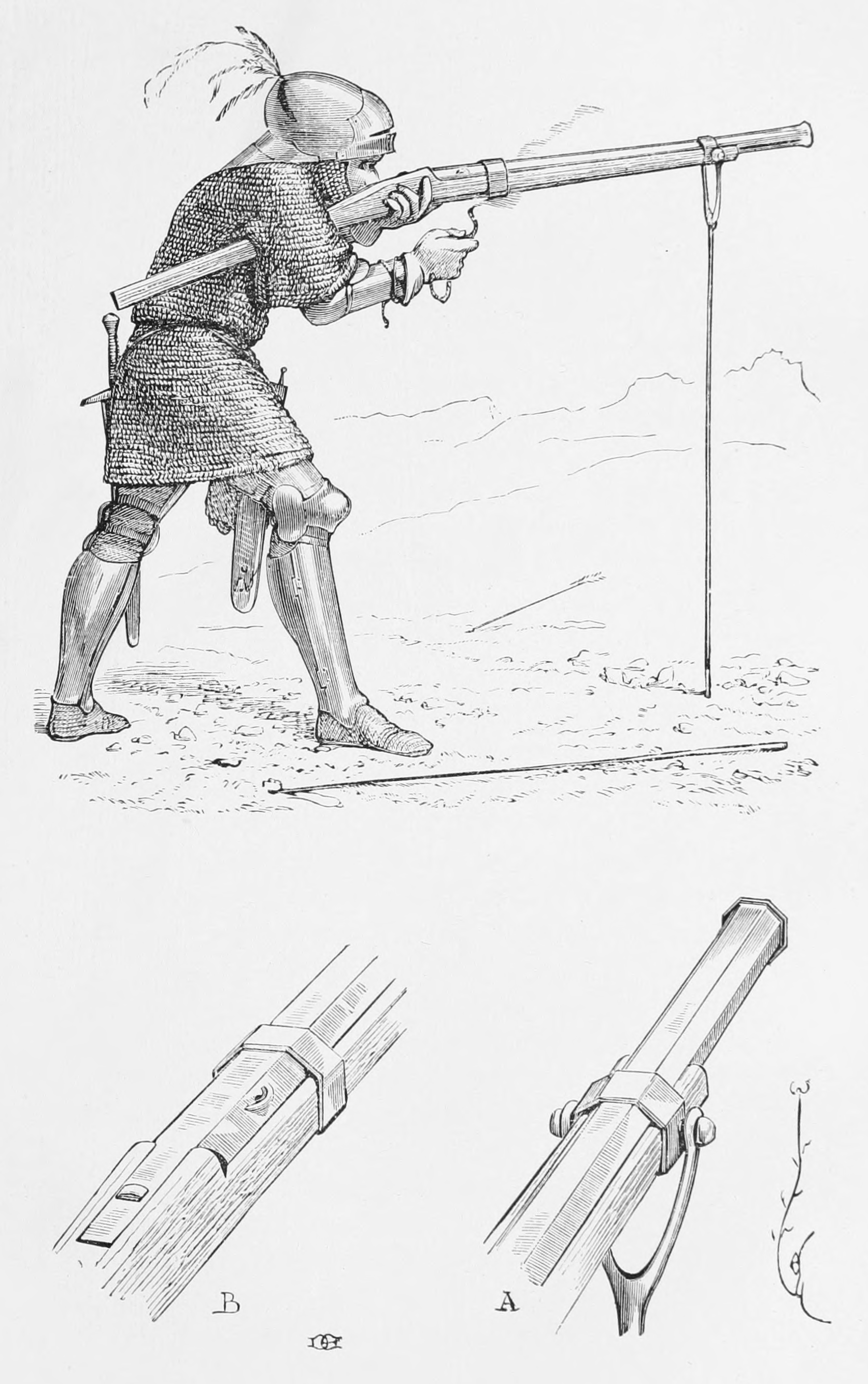
Depiction of an arquebus fired from a fork rest. Image produced in 1876.

At the beginning of the 15th century, hand cannons were given a wooden stock that could be held with both hands and supported on the shoulder, which gave rise to the first arquebuses and slightly smaller calivers. By the middle of the 15th century, the touch hole had been moved from the top to the right side of the barrel, and a flash pan with a cover was attached to the barrel, which greatly facilitated firing with a lit match or hot iron held in right hand. Around 1450-1470, the matchlock mechanism was invented, which gave rise to the first matchlock guns, which were first called arquebuses, and then, as their weight and caliber increased after 1520, muskets. The first matchlock mechanism to be invented was serpentine lock.

== Mechanism ==
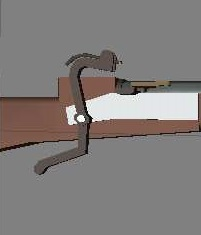
3D model of a serpentine lock.

Serpentine lock was the earliest and simplest form of matchlock. It was developed in Italy in the first half of the 15th century. The serpentine was simply a lever in the shape of the letter "S" that rotated around a transverse axis, fixed on the right side of the stock, before the flash pan on the right side of the barrel. A slow burning match was threaded through the clamp on the upper part of the lever (so called cock) and secured with a screw. Before the battle, the match was lit and the weapon was ready for action. By pressing the lower part of the lever (the forerunner of the trigger), the cock with the lit match was lowered and ignited the primer (black powder) in the flash pan, and from there the flame, through the touch hole, ignited the gunpowder charge in the barrel.

=== Popularity and influence ===
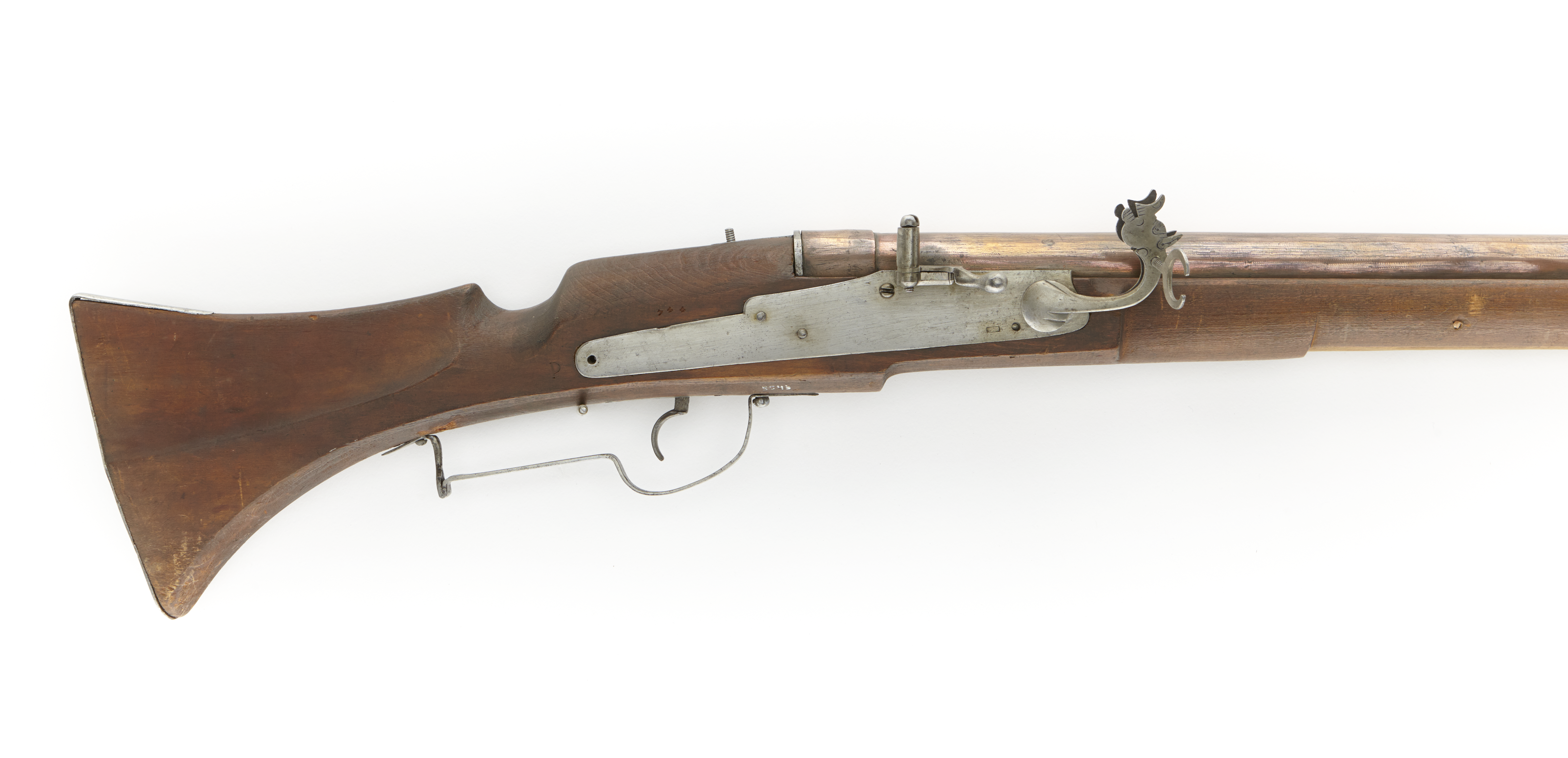
Typical West European matchlock musket, circa 1600.

According to Venetian and Ottoman sources, arquebuses with serpentine lock were already used in large numbers well before 1450. It is well documented that the first serpentine lock arquebuses were adopted into the armament of the Janissaries as early as the reign of Murad II (r. 1421–1451).

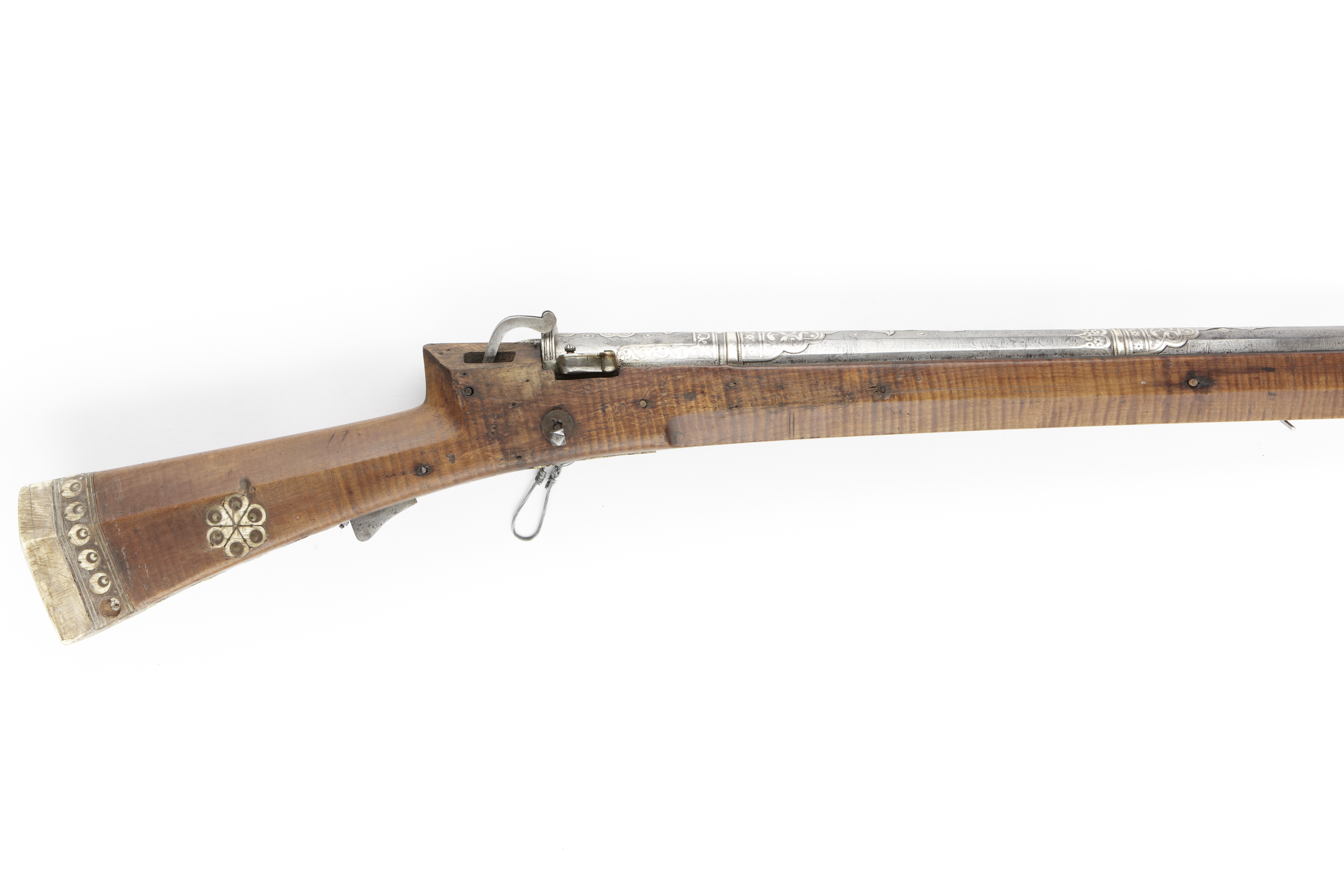
Turkish matchlock, circa 1600. The serpentine protruding from the cavity of the stock behind the flash pan is clearly visible, as is the lower part of the serpentine under the stock. There is no lock plate.

Simple serpentine lock was developed into several advanced types of matchlock before the end of the 15th century. However, simple serpentine mechanism was perfected in the Ottoman empire early in the 16th century and remained in use at least until 1688. This form of matchlock spread from the Ottomans to the Safavid Iran (after 1514) and Mughal India (after 1526), reaching Ming China circa 1524. In India it remained in use until the great rebellion of 1857, and in China at least until the end of the 19th century.

== Literature ==
- Roberts, Keith (2002). Matchlock Musketeer 1588-1688. Oxford: Osprey Publishing Ltd. p. 7. ISBN 9781841762128.
- Ágoston, Gábor (2005). Guns for the Sultan: Military Power and the Weapons Industry in the Ottoman Empire. New York: Cambridge University Press. ISBN 978-0-521-84313-3.
- Sarkar, Jadunath (1960). MILITARY HISTORY OF INDIA. Calcutta: M. C. Sarkar & Sons Private Ltd.
- Peers, C. J. (2006). Soldiers of the Dragon: Chinese Armies 1500 BC-AD 1840. Oxford: Osprey Publishing Ltd. ISBN 978-1-84603-098-7.
- Hale, J. R. (1985). WAR AND SOCIETY IN RENAISSANCE EUROPE 1450-1620. London: Fontana Press.
- Arnold, Thomas F. (2001). Renaissance at war. Cassell's history of warfare. London: Cassell. ISBN 978-0-304-35270-8.
