= Matchlock musket in China =

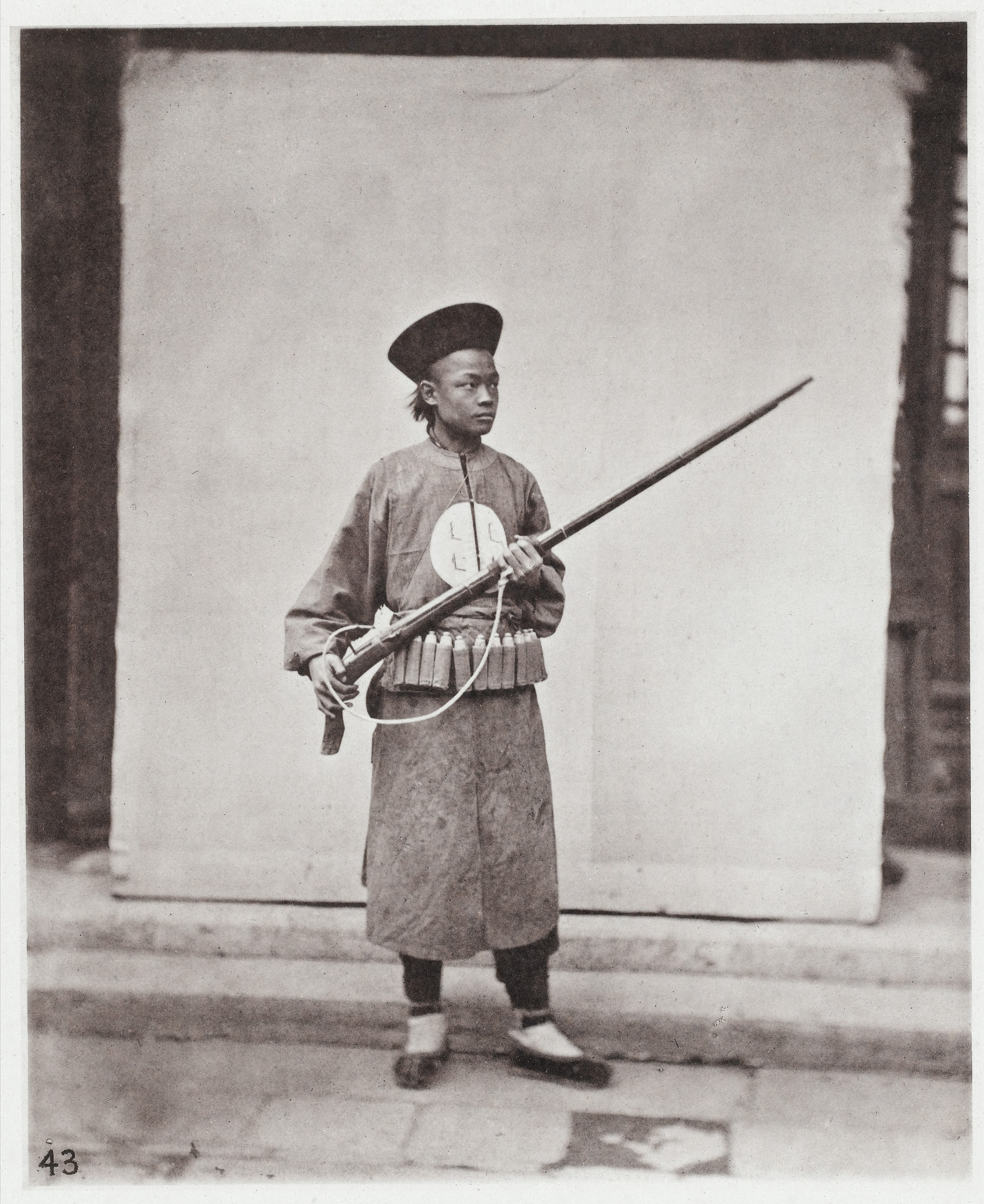
A Qing musketeer armed with a simple matchlock, photographed in 1874. The same lock as on the 16th-century Ottoman matchlock muskets is clearly visible.

Matchlock musket was used in China as both military and civilian weapon from the middle of 16th century, and were still part of the armament of the Qing imperial army till the end of the 19th century, which at this time, had become outdated.

== History ==
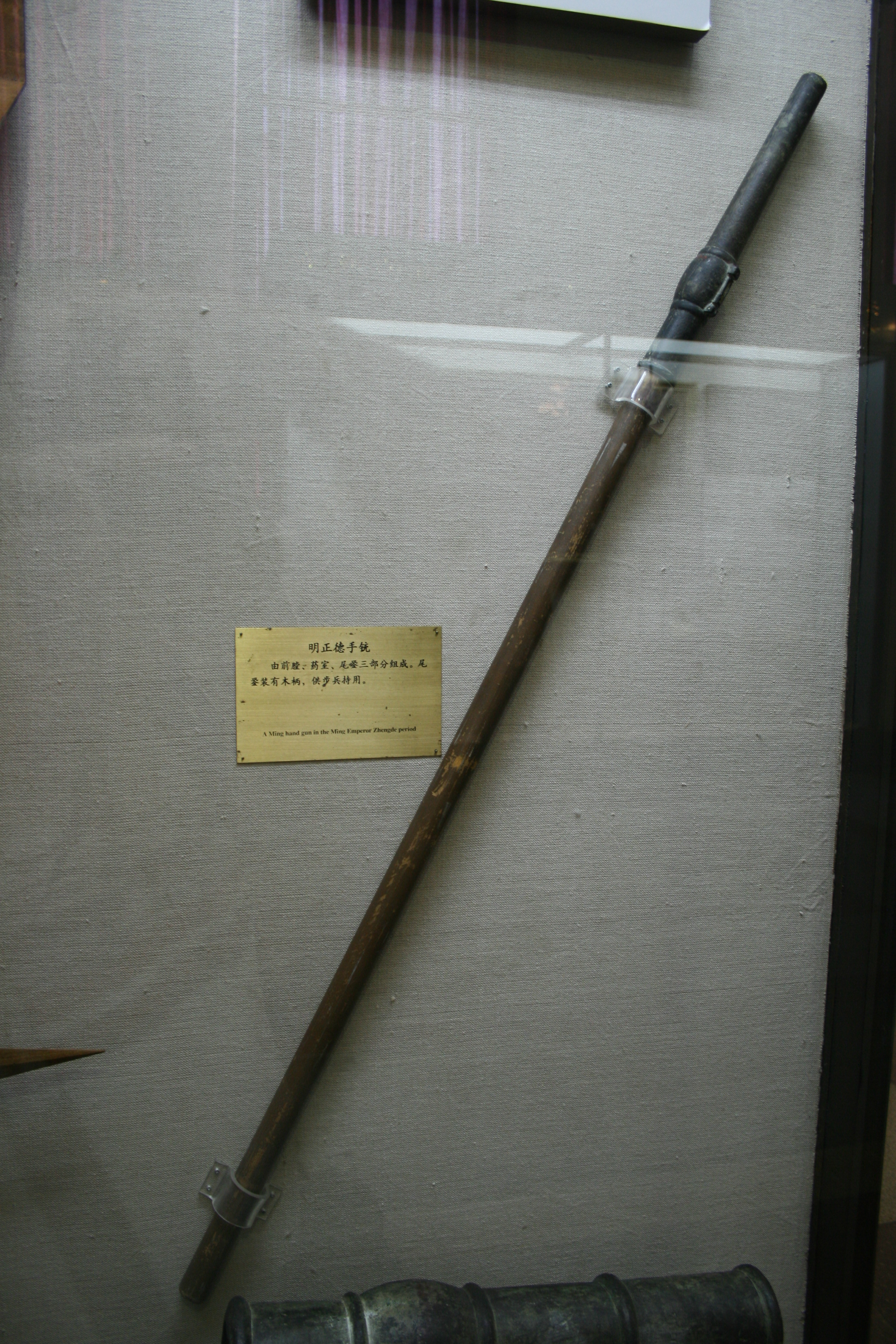
Ming dynasty hand cannon, made in 1505.

=== Ming Dynasty: Bird guns ===
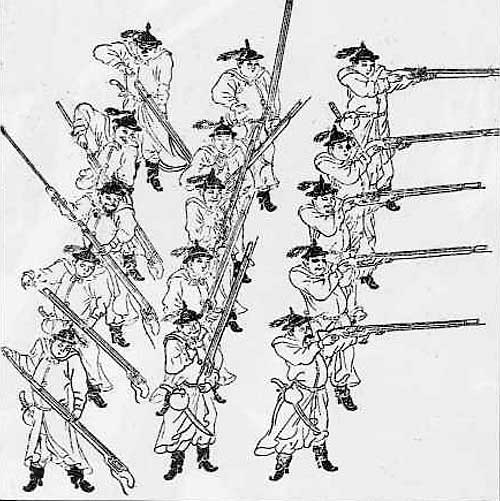
Ming musketeers training volley fire (illustration from a Ming military manual, 1639).

The first matchlock muskets from the Ottoman Empire were introduced to northwestern China via Turfan during the fighting in Hami Prefecture (eastern Xinjiang) in 1513–1524. However, they were not widely adopted in China at the time. In the rest of the country muskets were introduced before the end of the 1540s by Japanese pirates, who only recently copied them from the Portuguese in 1543. Around this time (1529), the production of larger cannons based on the Portuguese model also began in China.

Ming forces had obtained arquebuses by 1548, when a Ming soldier named Li Guangshou wounded a smuggler using a matchlock. In 1548-49, Zhu Wan captured matchlocks from a multinational group of smugglers. The term bird gun (Chinese: 鳥銃) was mentioned in the military manual Jixiao Xinshu, which was published in 1560. The book was written by the Ming general Qi Jiguang, who encountered tanegashima firearms while fighting against Wokou (multiethnic pirate groups in the Sea of Japan) in South China (1555-1560). He stated in the Lianbing shiji (1571-77) that the tanegashima were the origin of Chinese matchlocks. However in 1562, Zheng Ruozeng stated that bird guns had already entered China before the seizure of Tanegashima in 1548, but were not yet being produced there. One source states that the Ming army captured matchlocks from two Portuguese ships in 1523. Around 1553, Zhao Chen proposed manufacturing bird-beak guns to combat pirates. The Ming re-encountered matchlock-wielding Wokou in 1554 when a Ming soldier was wounded by one. In 1555, Ming soldiers on the walls of Nanjing fired at Wokou using matchlocks. One Chinese source credits the pirate Wang Zhi with introducing arquebuses to the Chinese government. An official ordered him to manufacture them after his surrender in 1558. By 1558, large scale production of arquebuses began in Chinese state arsenals. That year, the first batch of 10,000 guns was produced. In the same year, many Wokou were gunned down by Ming soldiers wielding matchlocks.

By the late Ming dynasty, bird guns were used extensively, but were not the primary infantry weapon. A military report from the early 1620s, during the war with the Later Jin dynasty of the Jurchens, requested the mobilization of 130,000 new soldiers and production of 7000 san yan chong (hand cannons) and bird guns. During 1618-1622 Ming Ministry of Works reported the production of 6,425 muskets, 98,547 polearms and swords, 26,214 great “horse decapitator” swords, and 42,800 bows. In 1629 Minister of Rites Xu Guangqi, a Catholic convert under Portuguese influence, proposed the formation of new brigades consisting of 5,200 infantry each, of which 1200 would be armed with bird guns.

=== Qing Dynasty ===
The Qing army relied mostly on the bow and arrow until the 19th century, although it was an early adopter of modern European-style artillery. A British report from 1793 survives, according to which Chinese officers considered matchlocks to be superior to flintlocks - although the flintlocks were quicker to reload, they were considered less reliable and more prone to misfire. By the 1820s guns started to replace bows as the weapon of choice. Even so, the majority of the Chinese army remained armed with edged weapons. According to British reports from 1841, a small proportion of Chinese soldiers had matchlocks, while the majority had nothing but swords, bows and arrows. Muskets of this type remained as military weapon in China until the end of the 19th century. In the 1840s, observations of Qing infantry drills with handheld firearms described them as undisciplined, impractical, and acrobatic.

== Gallery ==
Matchlock muskets of a similar type from the Ottoman Empire and China

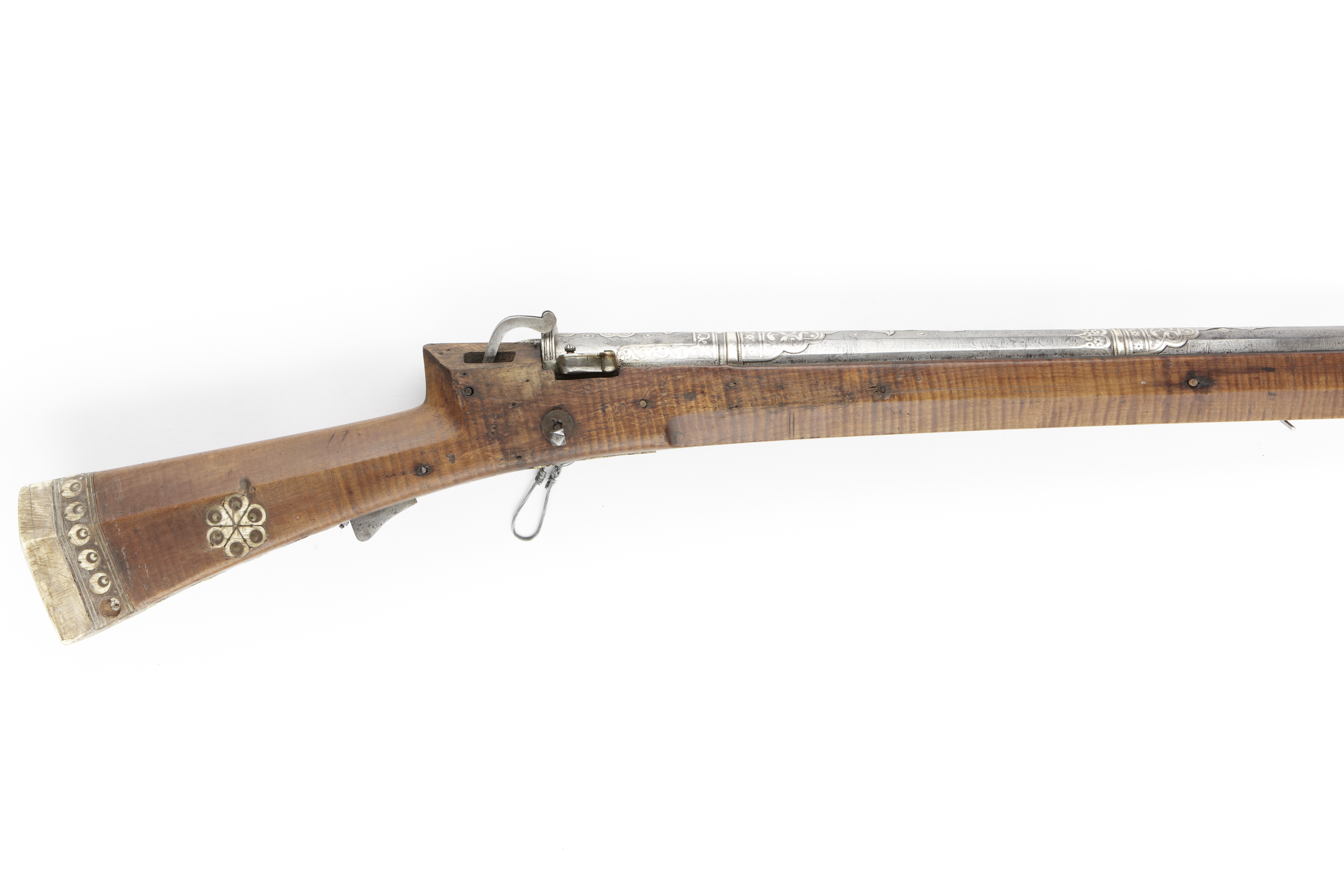
Ottoman matchlock, circa 1600. The serpentine protruding from the cavity of the stock behind the flash pan is clearly visible, as is the lower part of the serpentine under the stock. There is no lock plate.

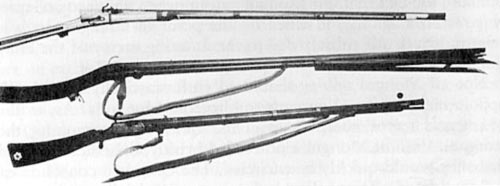
Ming matchlock muskets (17th century).

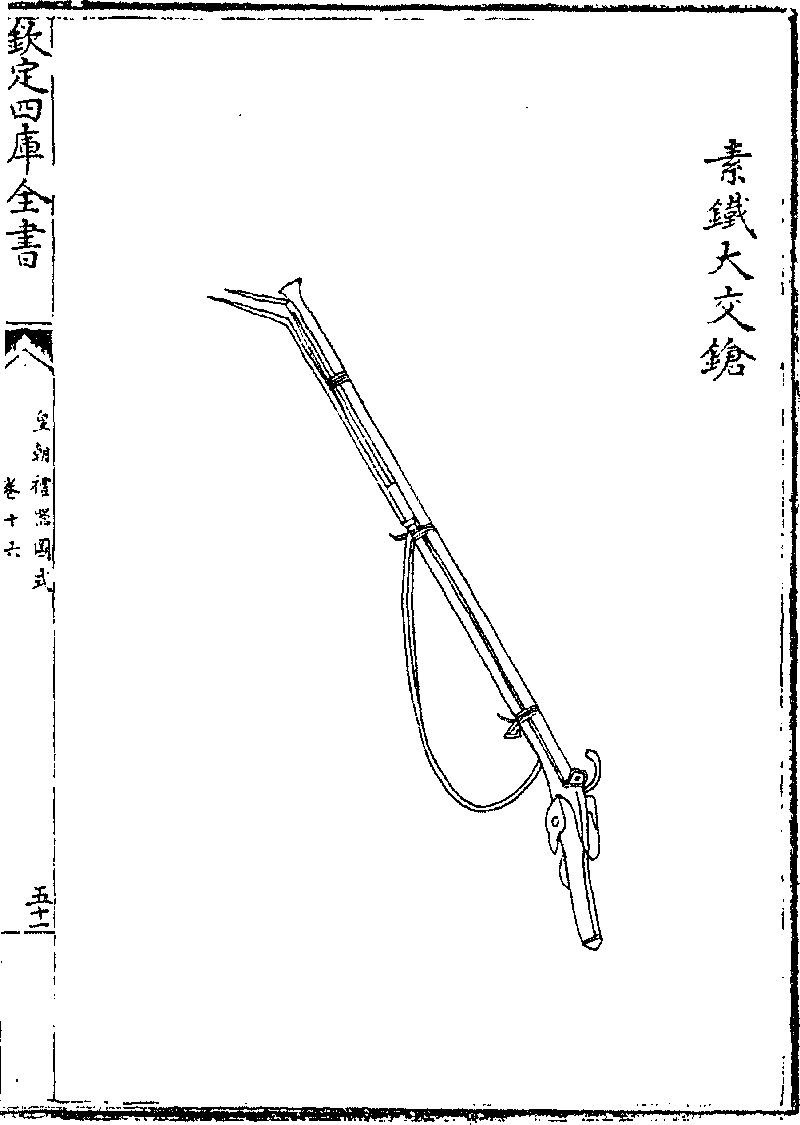
Qing matchlock musket from Vietnam (illustration from 1767).

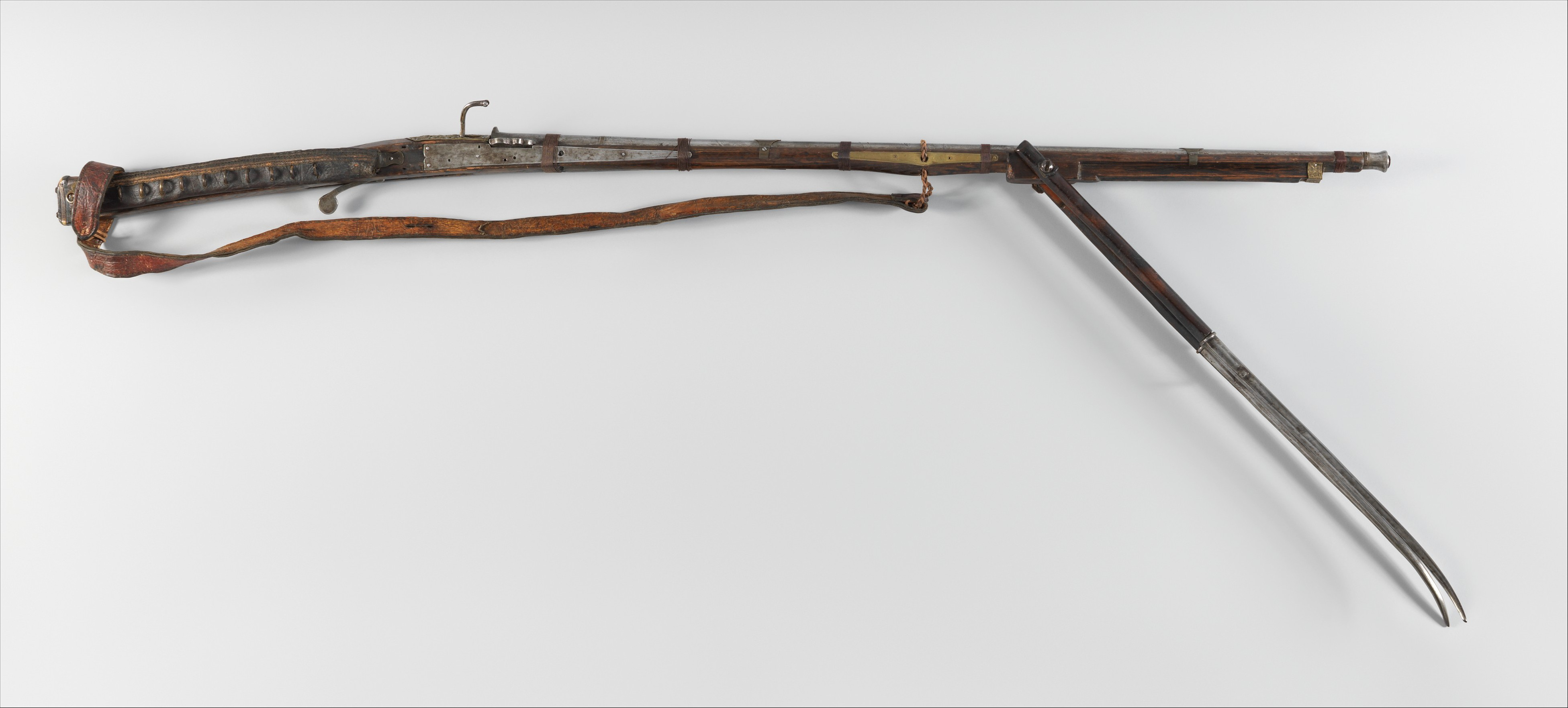
Tibetan matchlock musket, about 1850.

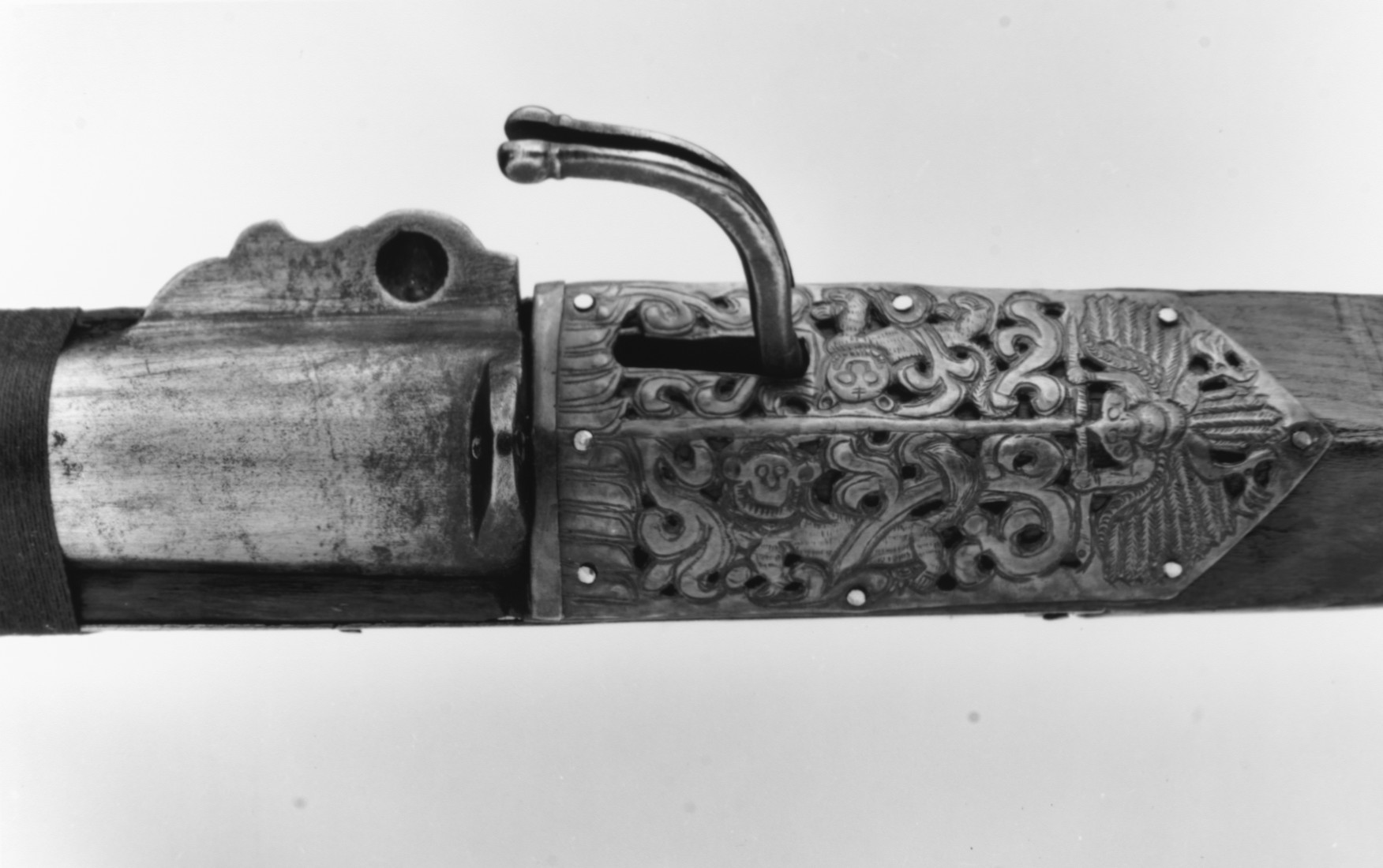
Lock of the Tibetan musket.

== Literature ==
- Needham, Joseph; Ho, Peng Yoke; Lu, Gwei-Djen; Wang, Ling (1986). Science and civilisation in China: the gunpowder epic. Cambridge London New York [etc.]: Cambridge university press. pp. 425–471. ISBN 978-0-521-30358-3.
- Andrade, Tonio (2016). THE GUNPOWDER AGE: China, Military Innovation, and the Rise of the West in World History. Princeton and Oxford: Princeton University Press. ISBN 978-0-691-13597-7.
- Swope, Kenneth (2014). The military collapse of China's Ming Dynasty, 1618-44. Asian states and empires. London; New York: Routledge, Taylor & Francis Group. ISBN 978-0-415-44927-4.
- Whiting, Marvin C. (2002). Imperial Chinese military history: 8000 BC-1912 AD. San Jose: Writer's Club Press. ISBN 978-0-595-22134-9.
- Peers, C. J. (2006). Soldiers of the Dragon: Chinese Armies 1500 BC-AD 1840. Oxford: Osprey Publishing Ltd. ISBN 978-1-84603-098-7.
