= Ottoman matchlock musket =

Early Ottoman firearm

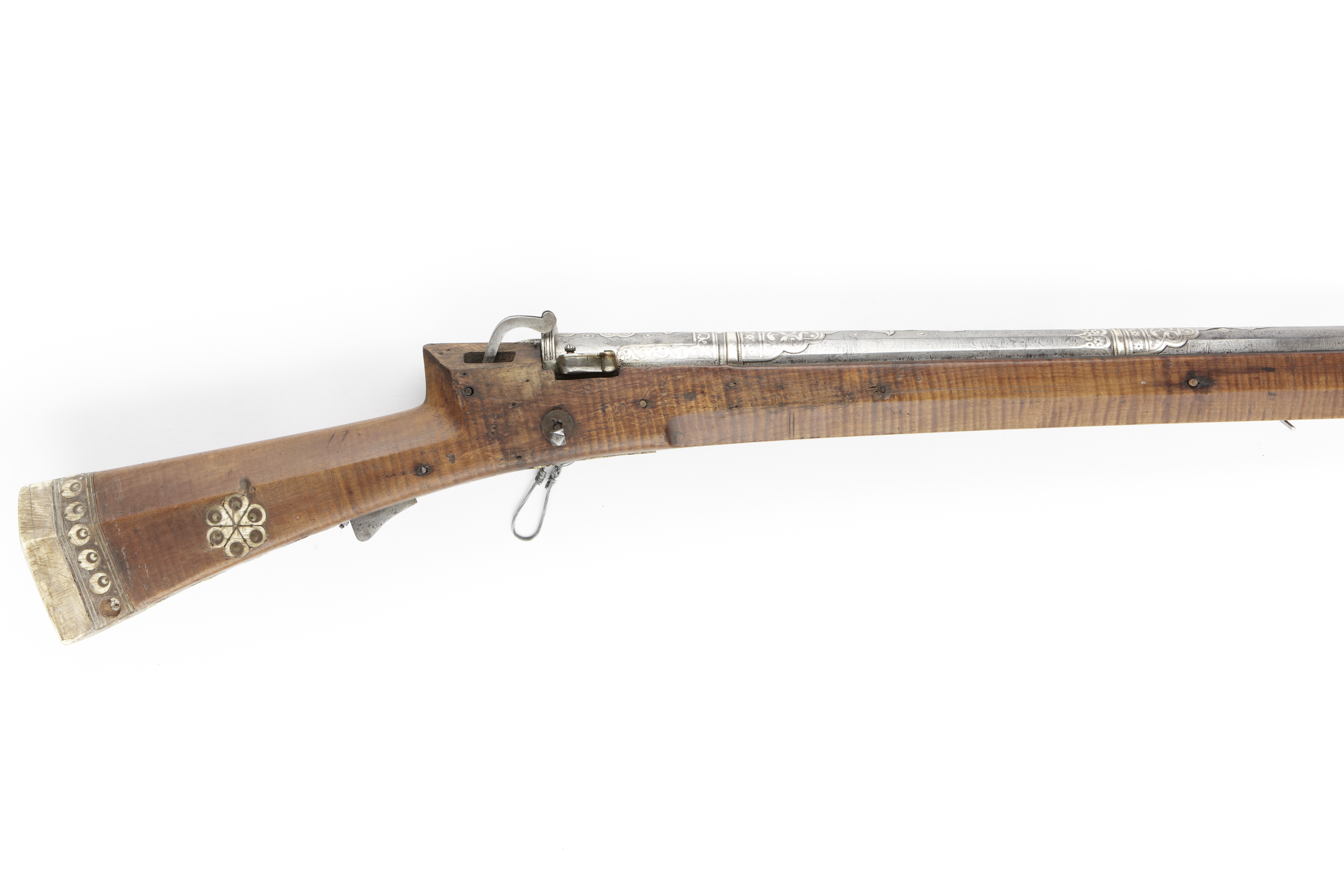
- Ottoman matchlock musket, about 1600.
- Type: Musket
- Place of origin: Ottoman Empire

Service history
- In service: 1500–1688
- Used by: Ottoman Army
- Wars: Hungarian–Ottoman Wars; Long Turkish War; Morean War; Great Turkish War

Production history
- Designed: mid 1400s
- Produced: 1400s-1688
- Variants: Trench gun

Specifications
- Mass: 3-4.5 kg
- Length: 115-140 cm
- Calibre: 11-20 mm
- Action: Matchlock
- Rate of fire: User dependent, usually 1-2 rounds a minute
- Feed system: Muzzle-loaded

The Ottoman matchlock musket (Turkish: fitilli tüfenk), an early Ottoman firearm, used from the mid-15th to the late 17th century.

== History ==
Very little is known about the early history of Ottoman gunpowder weapons. The Ottomans may have first encountered firearms in the Balkans in the mid-14th century, whether through trade or conflicts with the Republic of Venice and Hungary. By the Battle of Kosovo (1389) they were making use of cannons.

By the mid-15th century, the word tüfenk appears in the armament lists of Ottoman fortresses in the Balkans, most likely denoting a matchlock arquebus. It is not known whether these earliest Ottoman arquebuses had a serpentine lock or the more advanced matchlock mechanism. The first arquebuses were adopted into the armament of the Janissaries as early as the reign of Murad II (r. 1421–1451), although it was not until the mid-16th century that most Janissaries received arquebuses. Venetian sources state that Bayezid II (r. 1481–1512) supplied the Janissaries with better firearms, certainly a more modern version of the matchlock, but there is no mention of whether the new weapon was imported from Europe or produced by the Ottomans themselves. Historians of technology credit the Ottomans with perfecting the serpentine mechanism. Janissary arquebuses are known to have played a decisive role in the Battle of Mohács (1526).

Venetian sources mention that Murad III (r. 1574–95) equipped all Janissaries with muskets. This source undoubtedly refers to the newer matchlock musket, first introduced in the early sixteenth century by Spanish soldiers who, fighting in Italy against heavy armour, realized that they needed a more powerful weapon. The musket was larger than the arquebus: it had a longer barrel and could fire heavier projectiles at the same or greater velocity, and thus proved effective against heavy armour. John Francis Gilmartin has suggested that "the process which produced the sixteenth-century Turkish musket must have had a parallel with that which produced its Spanish equivalent", as "the tactical incentives and technological results were remarkably similar".

Until the seventeenth century, the Janissaries used matchlock muskets (Turkish: fitilli tüfenk), although from the late 16th century, flintlock muskets (Turkish: çakmaklı tüfenk) with the miquelet lock were being produced and gradually introduced in the Ottoman Empire. This mechanism spread throughout the Mediterranean and the Balkans thanks to the Ottomans, who were early adopters of it. Since the early flintlock muskets were not as reliable as matchlock muskets, and were considerably more expensive, the Ottomans, like Western Europeans, used muskets of both systems side by side until the late 17th century (after 1688).

== Characteristics ==
=== Light muskets ===
European sources from the 16th century often state that Ottoman muskets were larger and heavier than Christian muskets. However, generalizations should be taken with caution, because in addition to these heavy muskets, the Janissaries also used smaller and lighter rifles on a large scale. In 1567, the Janissaries in the Belgrade Fortress used muskets that fired 12- and 15-gram bullets. Similar weapons, firing 12-gram bullets, were used in Ottoman Egypt. Muskets produced in state workshops and used in Baghdad in 1571 fired 15-gram bullets. Given the weight of the lead bullets, these weapons had a caliber of between 13 and 14 mm and were probably similar to the smaller Janissary muskets used in field battles. These latter muskets were usually 115–140 cm long, weighed only 3–4.5 kg, and had a caliber of 11, 13, 14, or 16 mm (and rarely 19 or 20 mm). The characteristics of these Janissary rifles were very similar to those used by the Janissaries' European opponents. The "typical" matchlock musket in European armies of the sixteenth century was 120–150 cm long, weighed 2.5–4.5 kg, and had a caliber of 14–18 mm.

=== Heavy muskets ===
In siege warfare or in the defense of fortresses, the Ottomans used a heavy musket with an octagonal or cylindrical barrel. Known as the trench rifle (Turkish: metris tüfengi), it had a barrel length of 130–160 cm and a caliber of 20–29 mm, but larger calibers (35 and 45 mm) were used for firing shells. When European sources claimed that Ottoman rifles were heavier than European ones, they were probably referring to this weapon.

=== Quality ===
Regarding the quality of Ottoman muskets, the sources are contradictory. A former Janissary, who wrote the most detailed description of the corps around 1606, complained that the muskets produced in the state workshops in Istanbul were of inferior quality compared to those available from private gunsmiths. Raimundo Montecuccoli, on the other hand, claimed that the metal of Turkish muskets was of good quality and that their range and power were greater than those of Christian muskets, a claim that is also accepted by historians of technology. The latter suggests that the barrels of Ottoman muskets were stronger and more reliable than European ones, as Ottoman gunsmiths made the barrels by spiraling flat steel plates – a method similar to that used to make Damascus steel – which gave them great strength. On the other hand, the Turkish authorities themselves apparently had a better opinion of the quality of European weapons, as they had already begun importing muskets from England and Holland in the early 17th century, despite the blockade imposed by the Spanish and Venetian fleets. In November 1605, Maltese ships successfully intercepted an English ship carrying a cargo of 700 barrels of gunpowder, 1,000 arquebus barrels, 500 cavalry arquebuses, and 2,000 sword blades to Istanbul.

== Ottoman matchlock mechanism ==
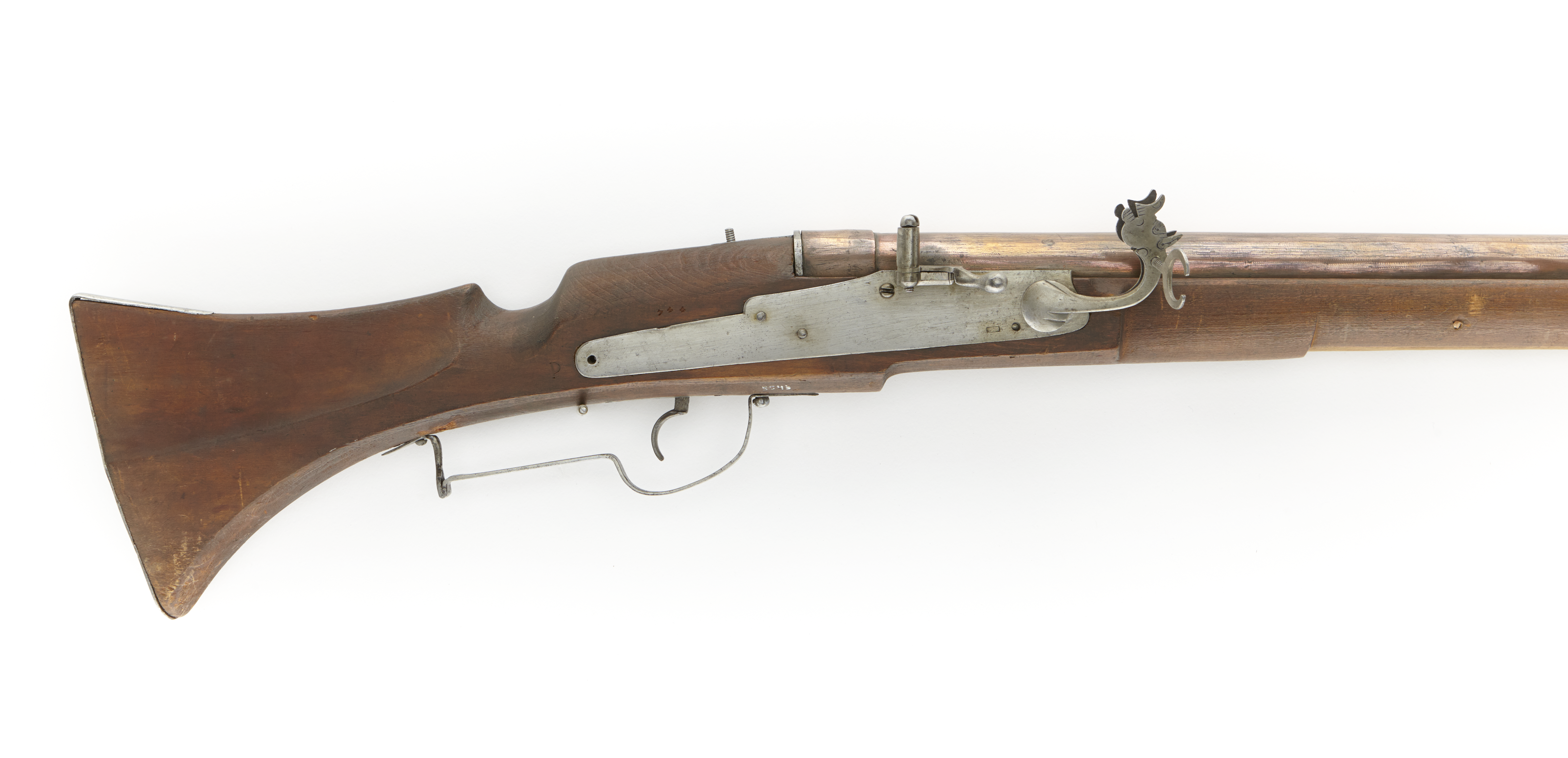
Typical Western European matchlock musket, circa 1600.

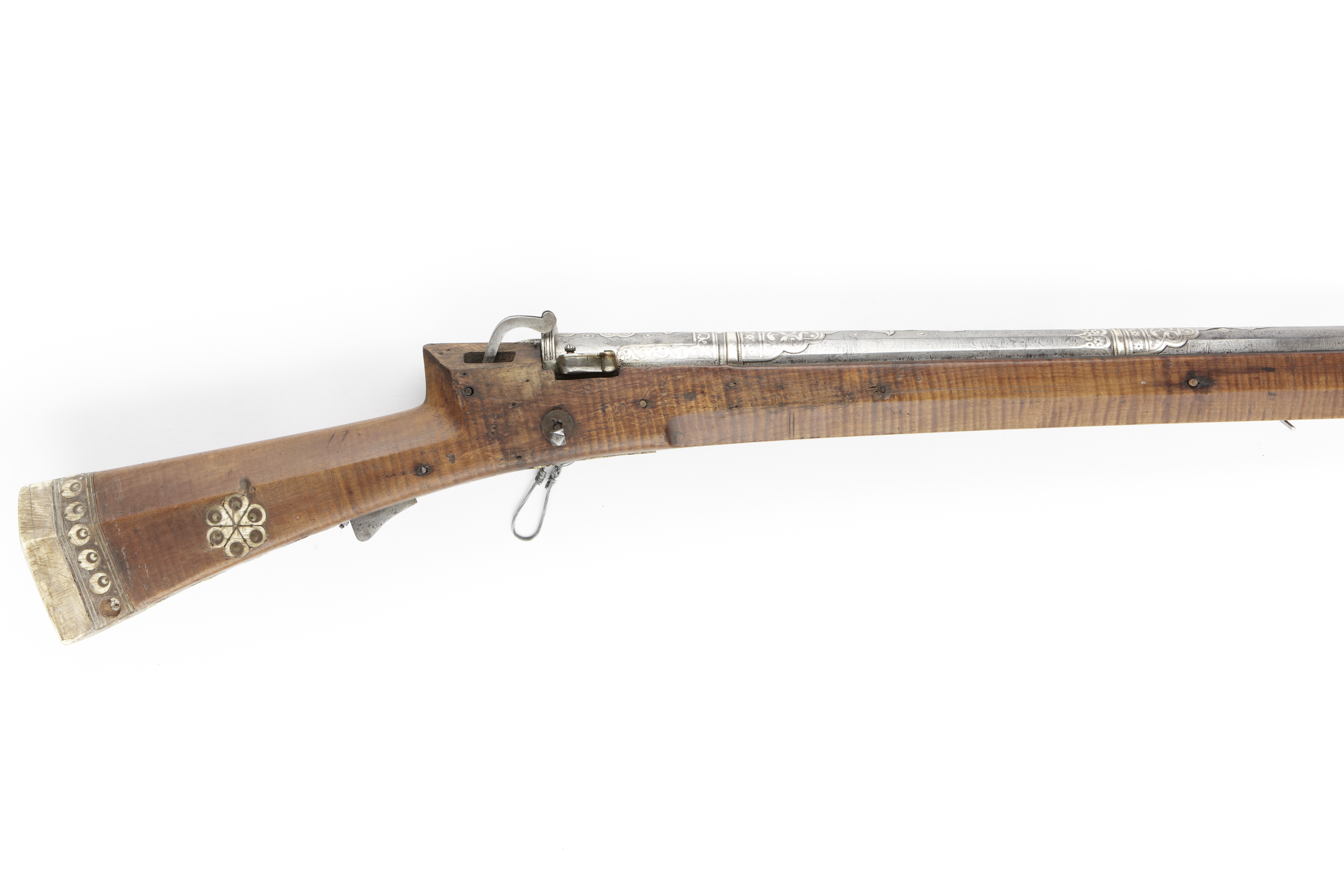
Turkish matchlock, circa 1600. The serpentine protruding from the cavity of the stock behind the flash pan is clearly visible, as is the lower part of the serpentine under the stock. There is no lock plate.

The lock mechanism of surviving Ottoman muskets from the 16th and 17th centuries is an older type that differs significantly from the muskets used in Europe at the time, as well as from the snap matchlock carried by Portuguese sailors to Japan (1543). The Ottoman lock does not have a lock plate, with a serpentine inserted into the cavity of the butt, before (near the end closer to the shooter) the flash pan. The upper end of the serpentine is bent to the right, to reach the flash pan on the right side of the barrel. Pressing on the lower end of the serpentine (under the butt) pushes the serpentine with the fuse forward and downward.

The evolution of the matchlock in the Ottoman Empire likely occurred when the first arquebuses were adopted into the armament of the Janissaries during the reign of Murad II (1421–1451), which was relatively early. Since the true matchlock, with a spring and trigger like a crossbow and a serpentine after the flash pan - further from the shooter, was invented in Europe afterwards around 1470, the first arquebuses in the Turkish army certainly did not have a matchlock, but only a serpentine. From surviving examples of Ottoman arquebuses and muskets from the 16th and 17th centuries, we see that Ottoman craftsmen had perfected the simple serpentine by the early 16th century at the latest, and produced their own type of lock, simpler and cheaper (without a lock plate, with fewer moving parts), but equally reliable.

== Influence ==
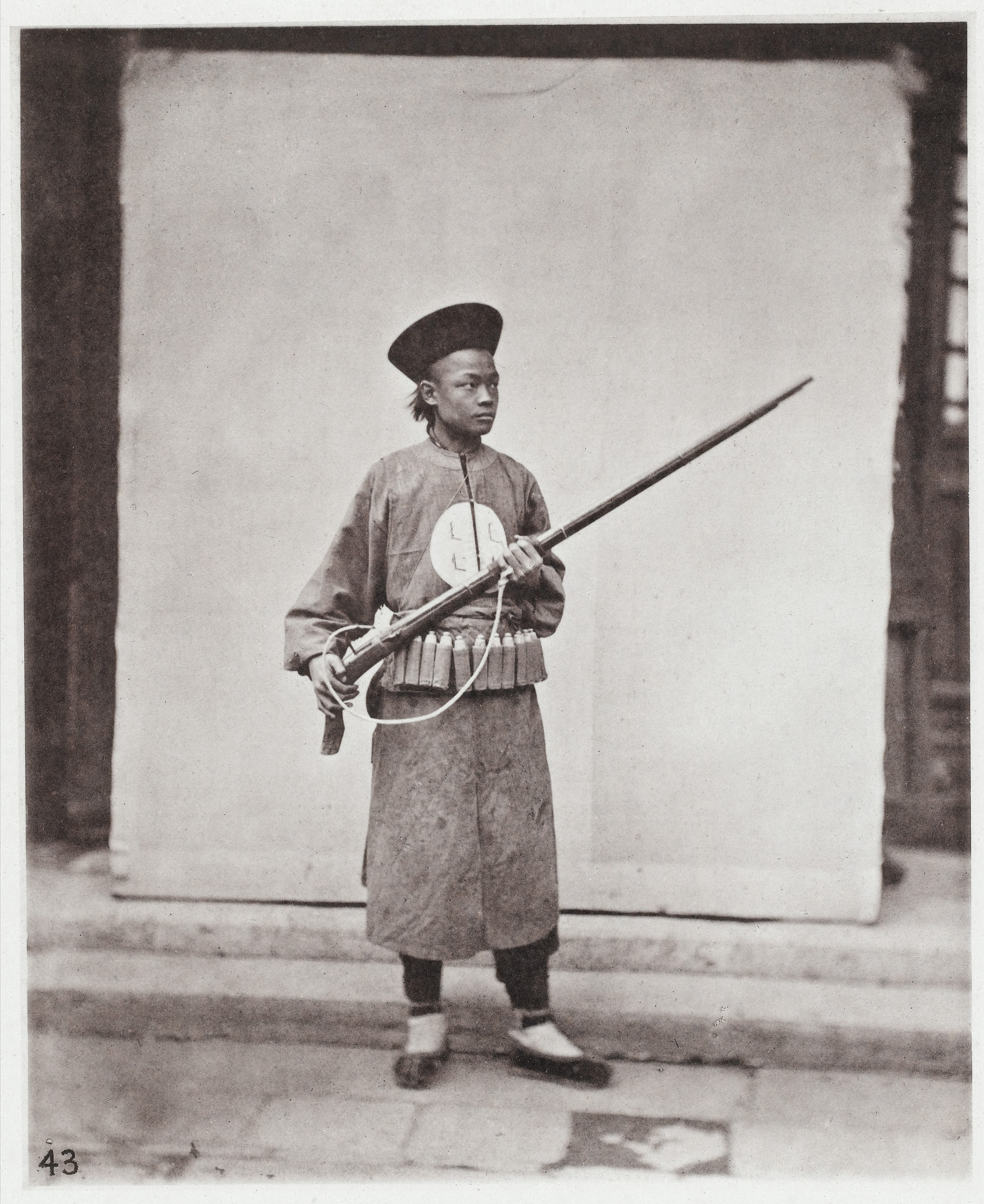
A Chinese musketeer armed with a simple matchlock, photographed in 1874. The same lock as on 16th-century Ottoman muskets is clearly visible.

This simple mechanism spread eastward during the 16th century, first to Persia (after 1514), and from there to India (after 1526) and Afghanistan, across Central Asia all the way to Ming Dynasty China (c. 1513–1524). Muskets of this type remained in use in China and India until the end of the 19th century.

== Gallery ==
Matchlocks of the Ottoman system (from Ottoman Empire to China)

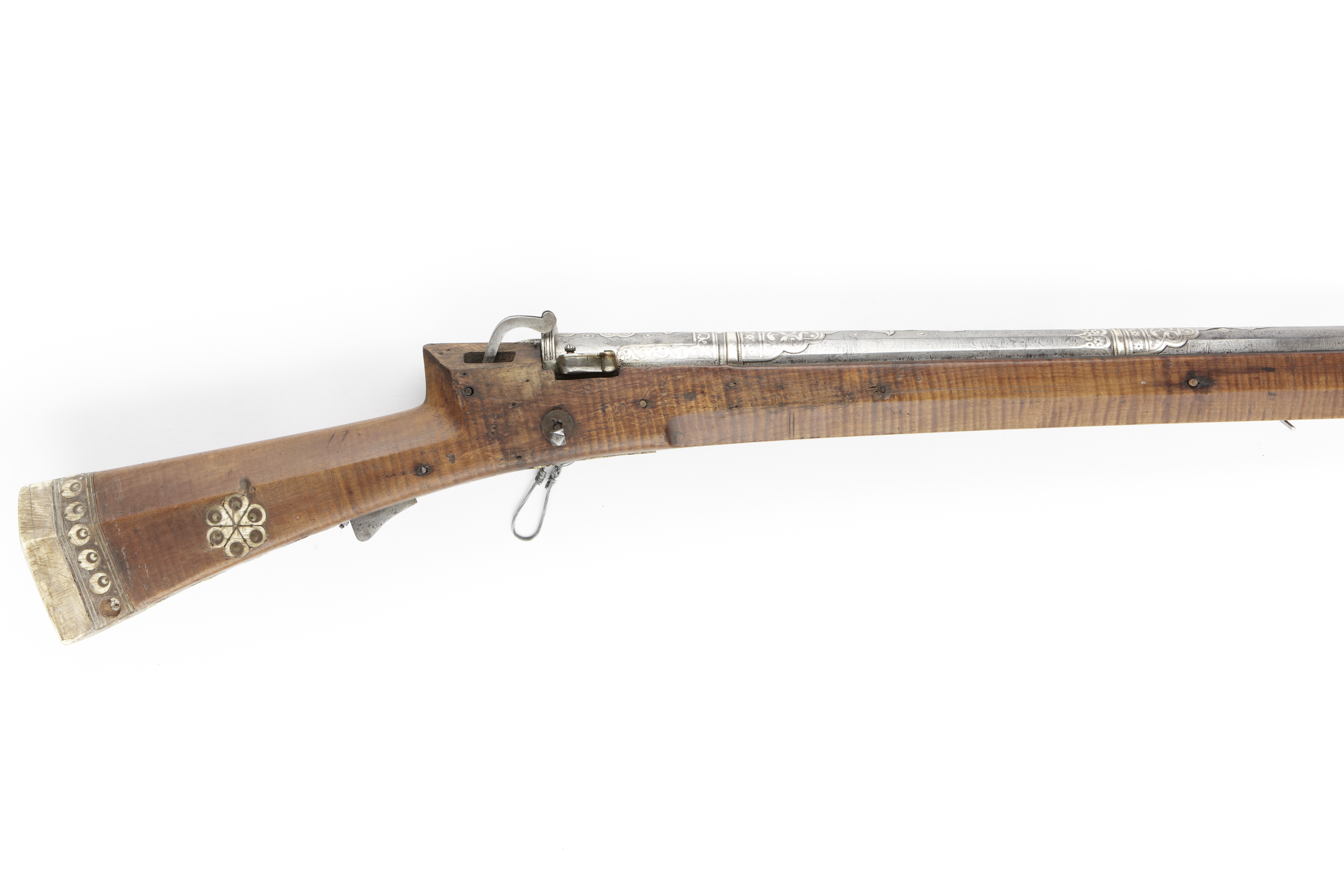
Turkish matchlock, circa 1600.

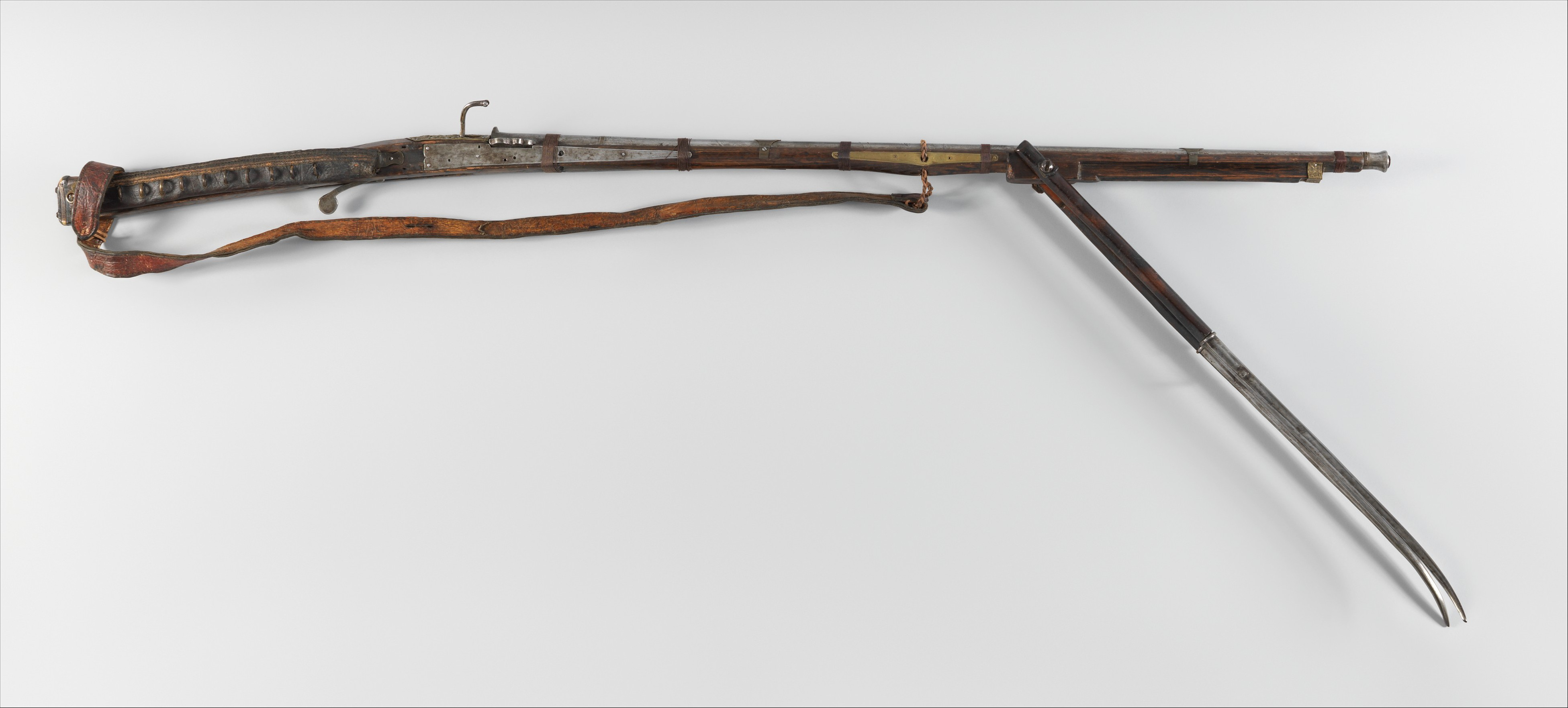
Tibetan matchlock musket, about 1850

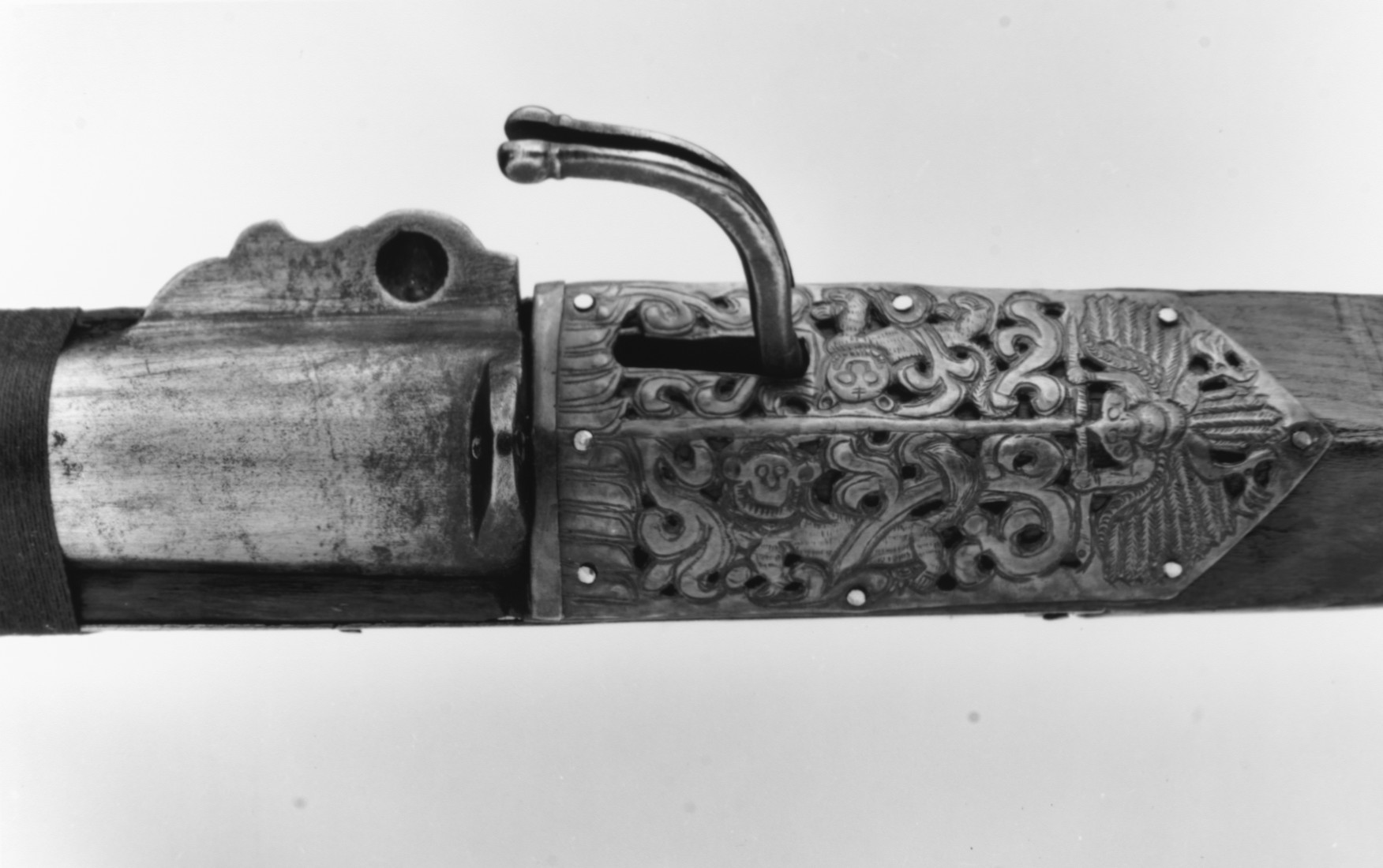
Lock of the Tibetan musket.

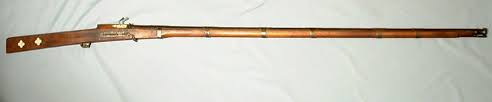
Matchlock from the Sikh Empire, 19th century.

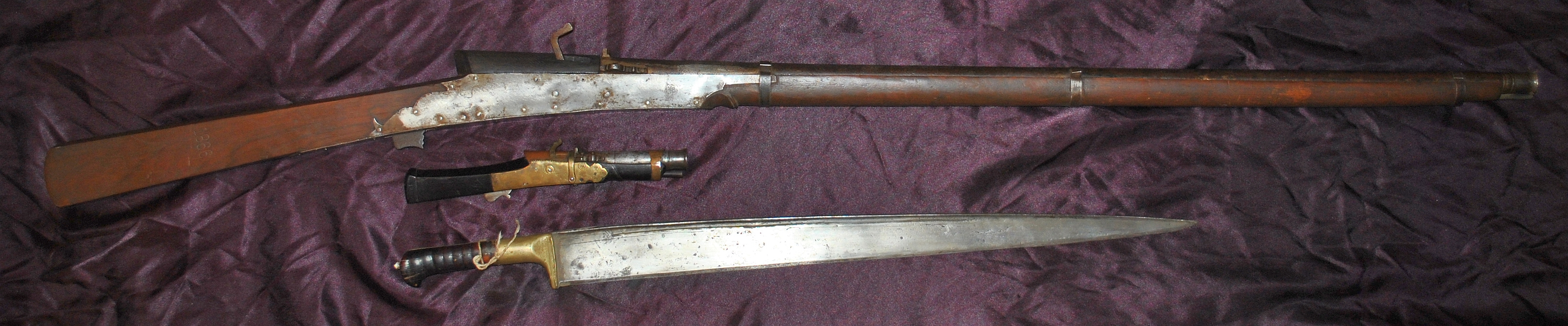
Indian toradar, a musket and a pistol, 19th century.

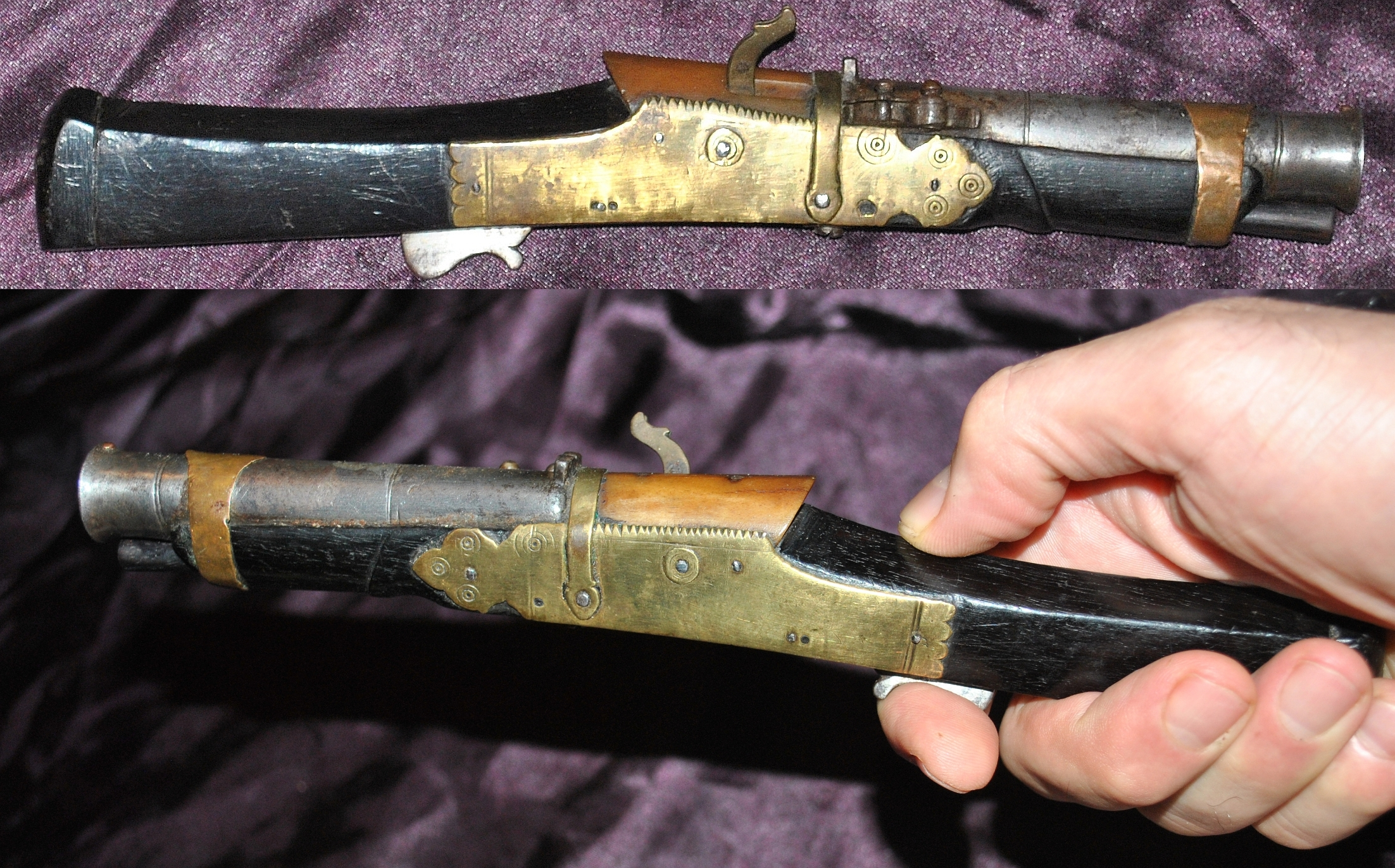
Indian matchlock pistol.

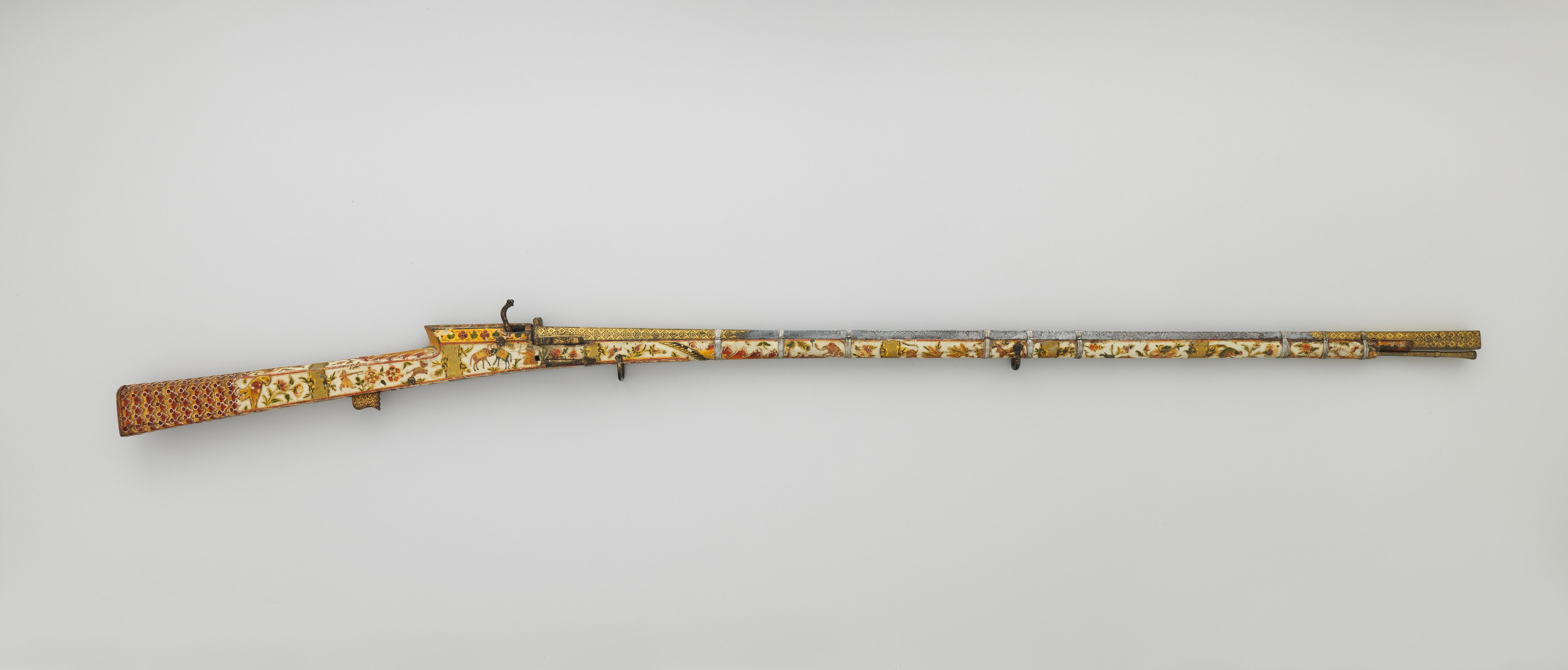
Indian toradar, late 18th or early 19th century.

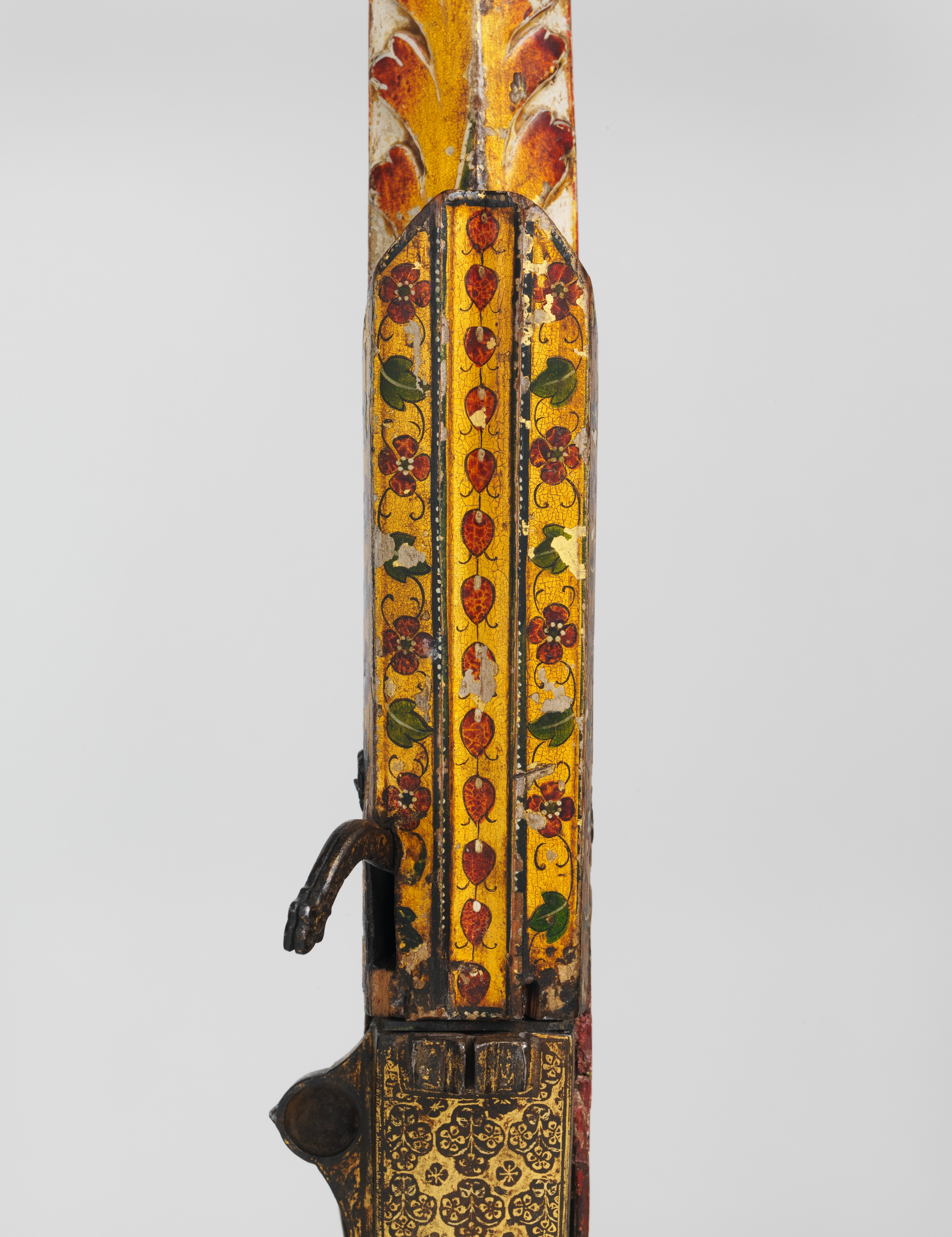
Lock of the toradar.

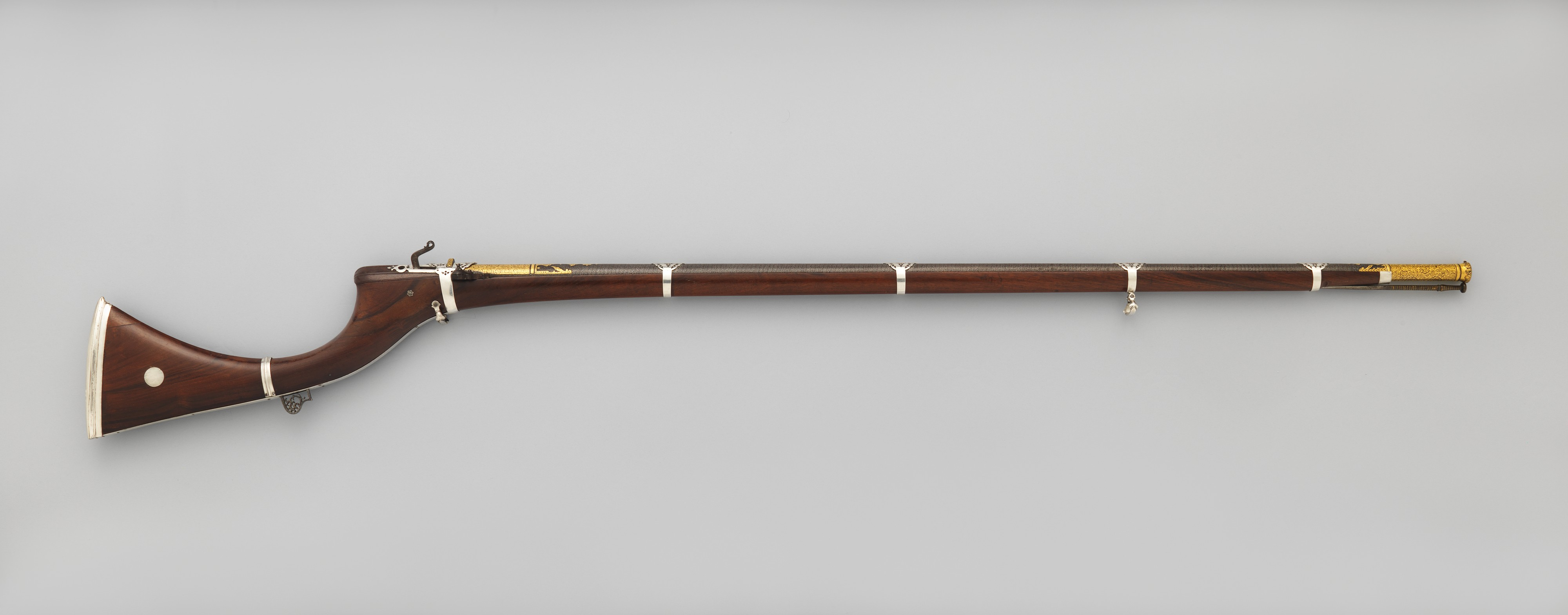
Matchlock from Sindh, second quarter of the 19th century.

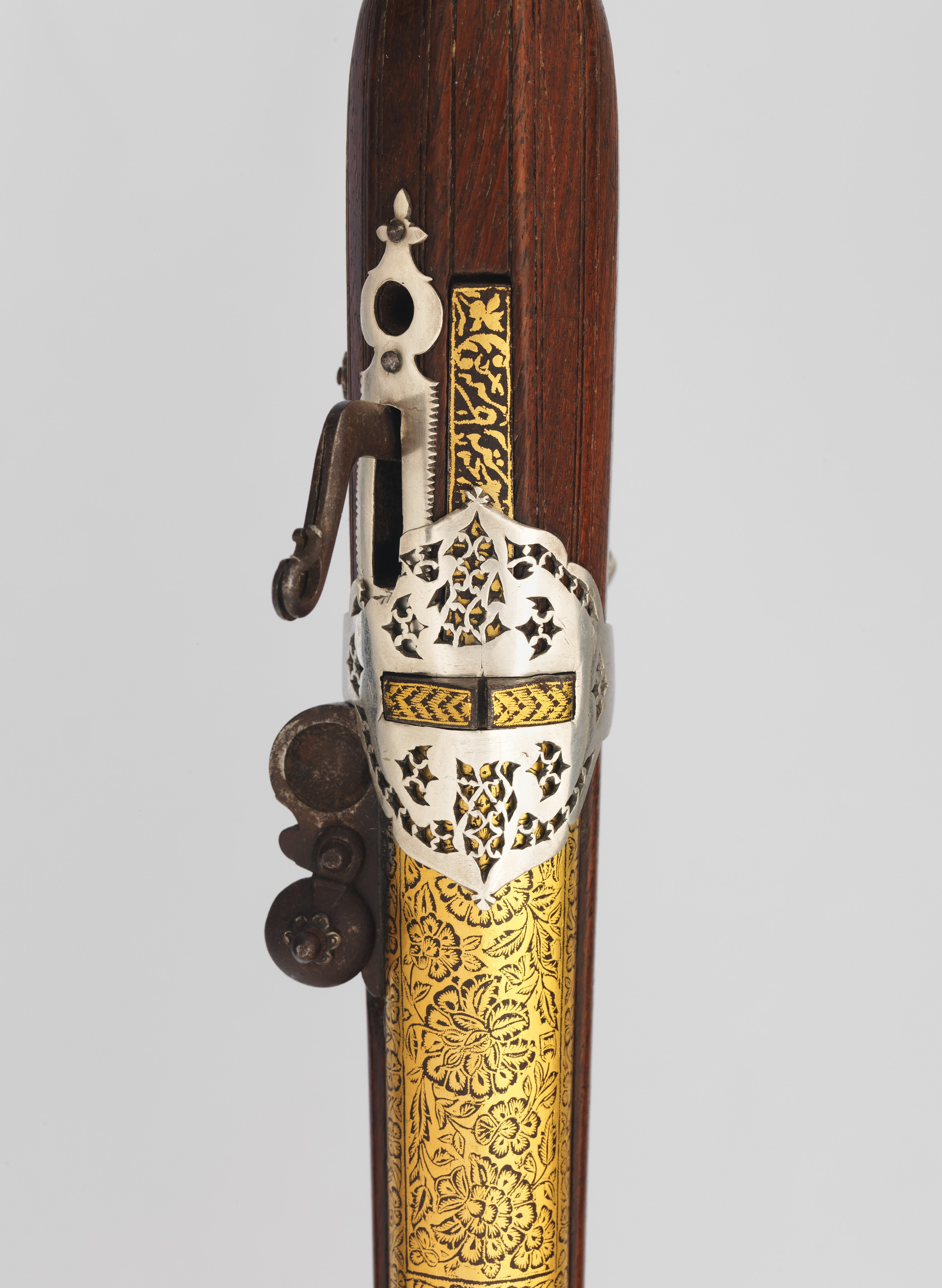
Lock of the Sindh musket.

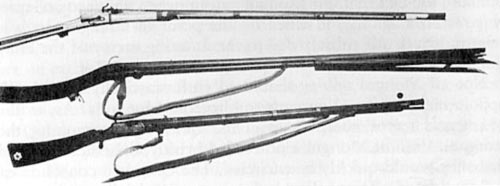
Ming dynasty matchlock musket (16-17th century).

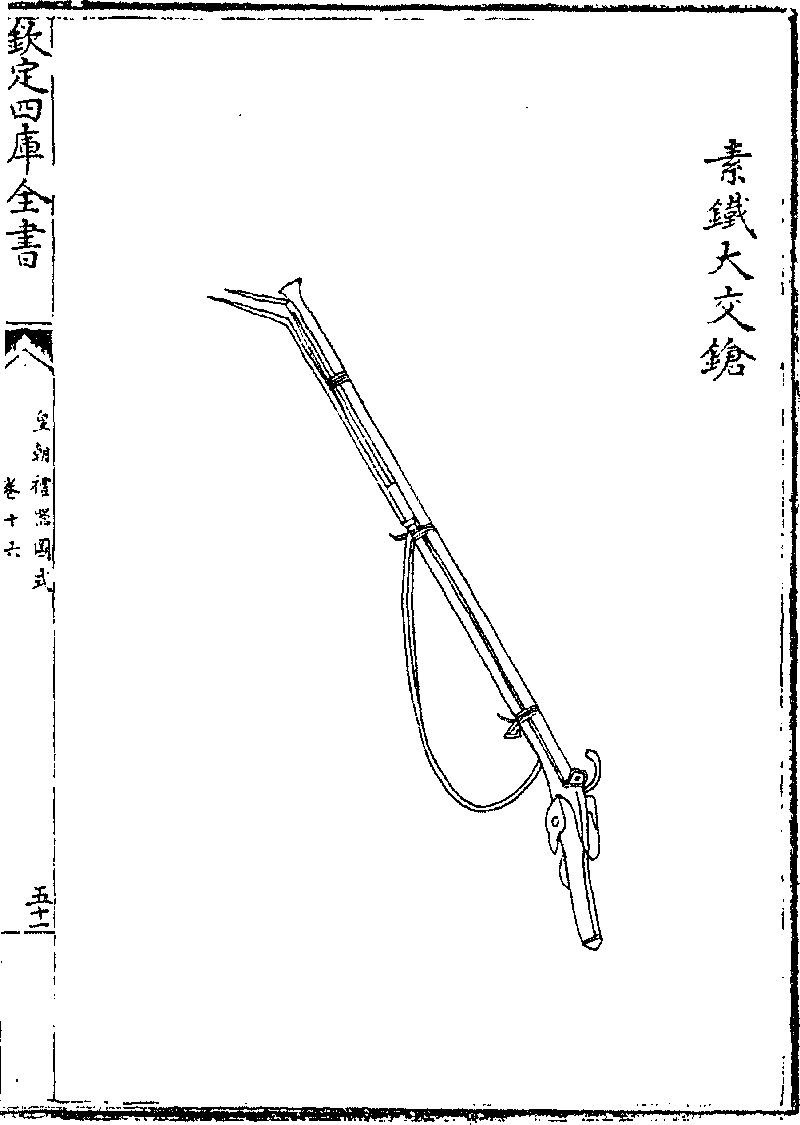
Qing dynasty musket from Vietnam, drawing from 1767.

== Literature ==
- Ágoston, Gábor (2009). "Firearms". In Ágoston, Gábor (ed.). Encyclopedia of the Ottoman Empire. New York: Facts On File, Inc. pp. 218–220. ISBN 978-0-8160-6259-1.
- Ágoston, Gábor (2005). Guns for the Sultan: Military Power and the Weapons Industry in the Ottoman Empire. New York: Cambridge University Press. ISBN 978-0-521-84313-3.
- Andrade, Tonio (2016). The Gunpowder Age: China, Military Innovation, and the Rise of the West in World History. Princeton and Oxford: Princeton University Press. ISBN 978-0-691-13597-7.
- Needham, Joseph; Ho, Peng Yoke; Lu, Gwei-Djen; Wang, Ling (1986). Science and civilisation in China: the gunpowder epic. Cambridge university press. pp. 425–471. ISBN 978-0-521-30358-3.
- Nicolle, David (1983). Armies of the Ottoman Turks 1300–1774. Illustrated by Angus McBride. Bloomsbury USA. ISBN 978-0-85045-511-3.
- Peers, C. J. (2006). Soldiers of the Dragon: Chinese Armies 1500 BC-AD 1840. Oxford: Osprey Publishing Ltd. ISBN 978-1-84603-098-7.
- Roberts, Keith (2002). Matchlock Musketeer: 1588–1688. Osprey.
- Sarkar, Jadunath (1960). Military History of India. Calcutta: M. C. Sarkar & Sons.
