= Chaco (footwear) =

American footwear brand

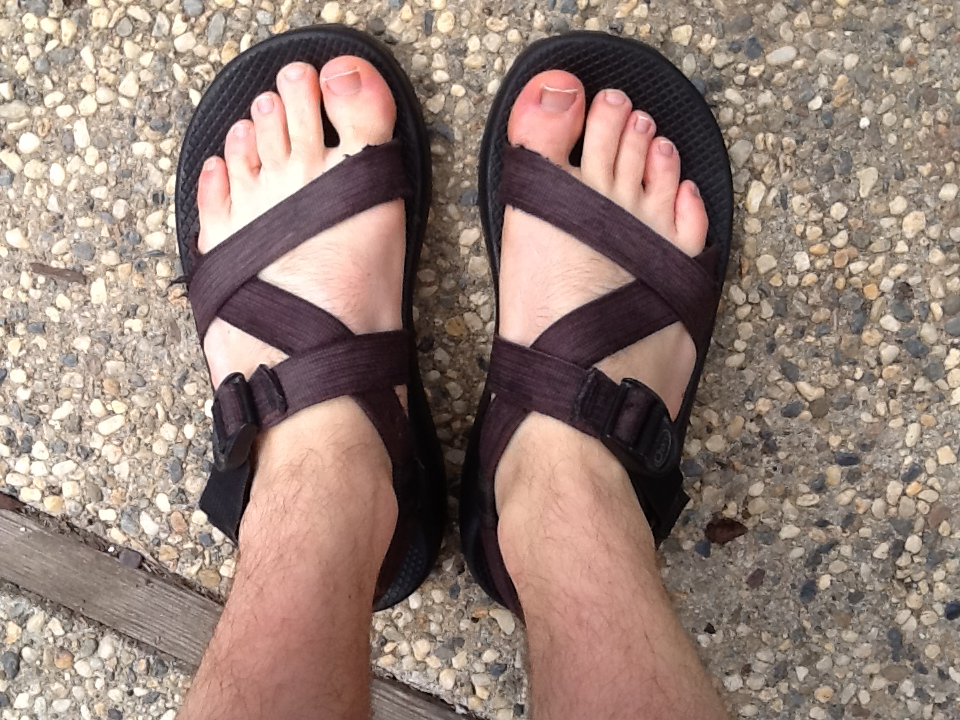
- Chaco Z/1 sandals
- Industry: Footwear
- Founded: 1989
- Founder: Mark Paigen
- Headquarters: Rockford, Michigan, USA
- Parent: Wolverine World Wide
- Website: chacos.com

Chaco is an American footwear brand known for its product line of adjustable Z-strap sandals for outdoor and water use. The Chaco brand also provides a variety of outdoor-influenced fashion sandals, shoes, flip-flops, boots and accessories.

The flagship line of adjustable outdoor sandals are distinguished by the fact that they use a single strap which loops around the foot through the sole, and so can be adjusted to fit without any extra fastenings. They are available with a range of sole types and strap configurations, to suit various environments, and the company offers a repair service. They are known for their sole support similar to that of a hiking boot, while still providing an open toe experience.

== History ==
In 1989, a white water rafting and fly fishing guide named Mark Paigen decided to create an outdoor sandal that allowed his feet to dry in the sun so he wouldn't end his days with wrinkled feet. His goal was to produce a sandal that also provided support to the foot. He created a pair of custom sandals that included a continuous pull-through strap of synthetic material and a buckle instead of velcro.

The first pair of shoes was sold to a client who accompanied Paigen on a 3-day float. Paigen traced that person's feet on paper and built a custom pair for $30. By 1991, after making the shoes in a spare room in his house, Paigen began selling his products in a small shop in Glenwood Springs, Colorado.

Customer feedback led Paigen to consult a pedorthist to improve the overall design of the shoe. After multiple changes, the sandal was ready to be put on the market. He decided to name the first sandal "Z/1" because his friend used a cheesy French accent and told him that the sandals were "Zee One!" The name had started as Gecko when the company first formed. They changed their name to Chaco, after the Chaco Culture National Historical Park.

A factory was established in the town of Paonia, Colorado, USA. In following years the products gained an international reputation and market. In 2008 the Paonia factory closed and production was moved to China. In 2009, the brand was acquired by Wolverine World Wide, the company that also owns Saucony, Merrell, Sweaty Betty and a variety of other footwear brands, and the Chaco facilities moved to the Wolverine base in Rockford, Michigan.

== Philanthropy ==
=== River protection ===
Chaco is focused on the protection of rivers and riverside lands throughout the United States because rivers are the reason the sandals are being made today. Chaco has donated $10,000 to river protection organization American Rivers for its 5,000 Miles of Wild campaign, which aims to protect 5,000 new miles of rivers in the United States.

=== Bear Ears National Monument ===
After the suggestion was made to shrink Utah's Bear Ears National Monument, the Chaco company began to fight against the changes. Chaco created a limited-edition version of the Z/Sandal with 100 percent of the net proceeds being given to a pair of non-profit organizations that fight to protect the monument. This launch was a success. Paigen tested his first pair of sandals in what is now Bear Ears National Monument, and so the fight to preserve the monument was personal for him.
