= Saucony =

American footwear brand

- Company type: Subsidiary
- Industry: Footwear, textile
- Founded: 1898; 128 years ago Kutztown, Pennsylvania, U.S.
- Headquarters: Boston, Massachusetts, U.S.
- Products: Athletic shoes, jackets, hoodies, T-shirts, sweatpants, shorts, socks, hats, backpacks
- Parent: Hyde (1968–2005); Stride Rite (2005–2007); Collective Brands (2007–2012); Wolverine World Wide (2012–present)
- Website: saucony.com

Saucony (/ˈsɔːkəni/ sock-a-knee) is an American brand of athletic footwear and apparel. Founded in 1898, the company is owned by Wolverine World Wide. Products commercialized by Saucony include footwear and clothing ranges, such as athletic shoes, jackets, hoodies, T-shirts, sweatpants, shorts, and socks. Accessories include hats and backpacks.

Saucony's shoe boxes once had the phrase "sock a knee" printed on them, which represents the correct pronunciation of the company's name. The Saucony brand logo represents the Saucony Creek's constant flow, and the boulders lining its creek bed. The company is a popular racing shoe producer, making track spikes and cross country racing flats. Saucony also makes shoes for specific track and field athletics events.

== History ==
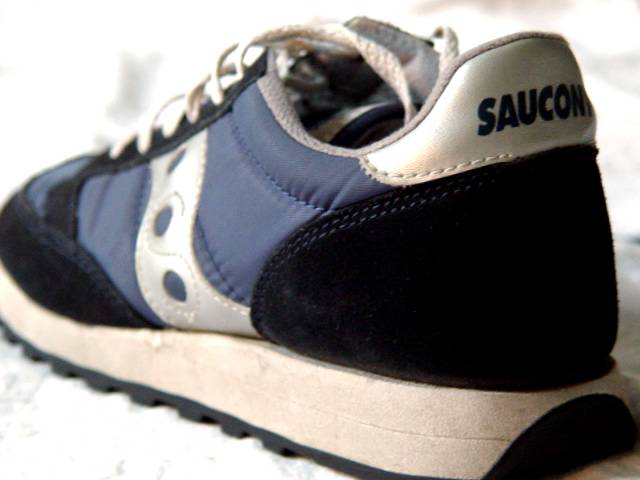
Saucony Jazz trainer

The Saucony Shoe Manufacturing Company's first factory was founded in 1898 at Kutztown, Pennsylvania by businessmen William A. Donmoyer, Thomas S. Levan, Walter C.C. Snyder, and Benjamin F. Reider. The company took its name from Saucony Creek, which flows next to the original factory in Kutztown. In 1910, Russian immigrant Abraham R. Hyde started a shoe company, A.R. Hyde and Sons, in Cambridge, Massachusetts. Over the years, Hyde became known for making athletic footwear including brands such as SpotBilt and PF Flyers. On June 13, 1968, Hyde entered into an agreement to buy Saucony, and the sale was completed on October 24, 1968.

In 1977, two of Saucony's running shoes were selected in the top 10 by Runner's World magazine (the Hornet was chosen best value), and by the following spring the demand for the product had gone up 2,000%. In 1998, when Saucony became Hyde's dominant brand, the name of the company was officially changed from Hyde Athletic Industries to Saucony Inc.

In 2005, Saucony was acquired by Stride Rite Corporation for $170 million. Stride Rite was acquired in 2007 for $800 million by Payless ShoeSource. The combined company became known as Collective Brands. In 2012, Collective Brands' Performance Lifestyle Group, which included Saucony, along with Keds, Stride Rite and Sperry, became part of Wolverine World Wide in a $1.23 billion transaction that also involved the sale of Payless ShoeSource and Collective Licensing International to private equity firms Blum Capital Partners and Golden Gate Capital. In 2016, Wolverine World Wide relocated Saucony and its other Boston-area brands to a new regional headquarters location in Waltham, Massachusetts. In 2024, Saucony opened an 11,000-square-foot Global Innovation Hub in downtown Boston at The Hub on Causeway, near TD Garden and North Station. This location serves as the central hub for the brand’s design, development, merchandising, and product management teams, moving from their former Waltham office to focus on urban innovation.

Wolverine World Wide sources a majority of its footwear from numerous third-party manufacturers in Asia Pacific and South America.

In February 2024, Saucony unveiled a shoe in collaboration with the Jerusalem Marathon, with IDF reservist Orr Sheizaf announced as the brand's ambassador for the event.

In 2025, Saucony sponsored the Saucony Run Shoreditch 2025, which resulted in a number of London running crews boycotting the 10km race because of Saucony's links to Israel. In response to the boycotts, Saucony ended its sponsorship of the Jerusalem Marathon.

== Footwear ==
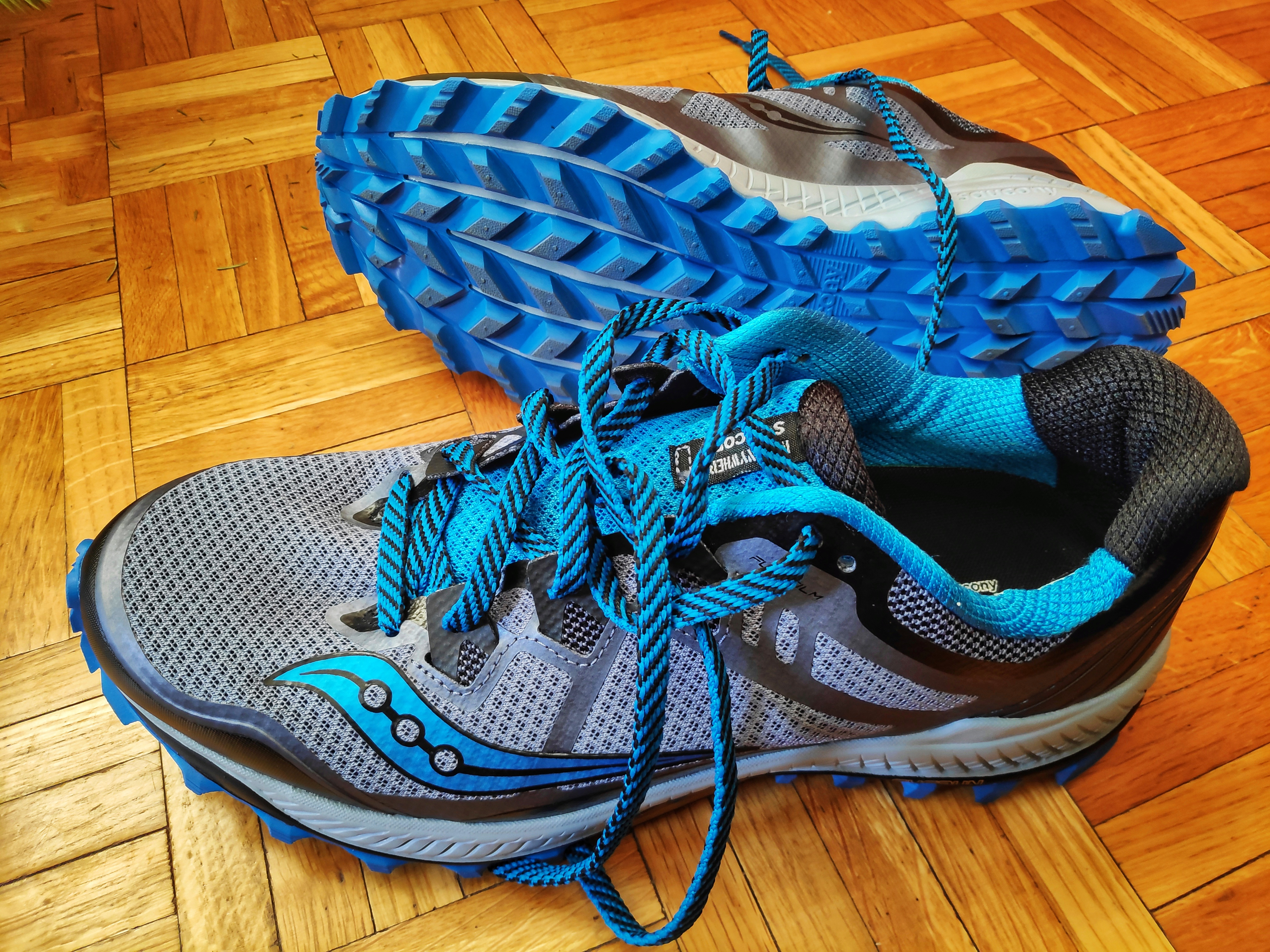
Saucony Peregrine 8 trail shoes

The company offers shoes for running, trail running, racing, and walking, utilizing specific technology relevant to the type of activity. Shoes are also made by focusing on the runner's foot size, type of running, arch type, and pronation.

On April 3, 2018, Saucony teamed up with the Massachusetts-based doughnut and coffee company, Dunkin' Donuts to produce a doughnut-themed, strawberry-frosted-looking running shoe to commemorate the 122nd running of the Boston Marathon. The Saucony X Dunkin’ Kinvara 9 comes in a doughnut box. The heel of the shoe is covered in rainbow sprinkles. The company again released a Dunkin' themed running shoe, the Kinvara 10, in March 2019.

=== Originals ===
Originals are Saucony's heritage range, which includes reintroduced older shoe styles produced by the company with different materials and colorways. These include the popular Shadow model, Jazz model, and Hornet model, the latter of which remains the company's biggest selling product.

== Sponsorship ==
The company sponsors and has sponsored many athletes, including American long-distance runners Molly Huddle, Laura Thweatt, and Jared Ward.
