= Chacos =

Chacos may refer to:

- A minor planet with designation 3984 (see List of minor planets: 3001–4000#901)
- Chaco (footwear), a brand of sandals and other footwear
