= Kathleen Wilson-Thompson =

American business executive

- Born: 1958 or 1959 (age 67–68)
- Education: University of Michigan (AB); Wayne State University (JD)
- Occupations: Healthcare HR executive; Automotive manufacturing
- Board member of: Tesla, Inc., Wolverine Worldwide

Kathleen Wilson-Thompson is a business executive. After a career at Kellogg Co., she joined the board of Tesla in 2018, and retired as executive VP of Walgreens Boots Alliance in 2021. She is on the board of Wolverine Worldwide.

== Early life and education ==
In the late-1970s Wilson-Thompson studied Literature in Ann Arbor, Michigan and in 1979 received an AB degree from the University of Michigan. She then studied law at Wayne State University, gaining a JD degree in 1982. Later, in 1996 Wilson-Thompson received a master's degree in Corporate and Financial Law from Wayne State University.

== Career ==
From 1986 to 1991, she worked at Michigan National Corporation as an attorney. She was then at Kellogg Co. for 17 years, until 2005. In January 2010, she became Senior Vice President and Chief Human Resources Officer at pharmaceutical company Walgreens Boots Alliance. She became a director at Vulcan Materials in 2009, and Ashland Global Holdings in 2017. She has been on boards of the Chicago Children's Choir and the American Red Cross of Greater Chicago.

As of late-December 2018, Wilson-Thompson was appointed to the board of Tesla, Inc. at the same time as Larry Ellison. In 2019, Wilson-Thompson received $7.4 million in cash and stock for this role. In April 2021, she joined the board of Wolverine Worldwide. Earlier that year, she retired from Walgreens Boots Alliance, where she had been executive VP and chief human resources officer.

In May 2025, as an independent director, she was part of a two-person special committee formed on the Tesla board to review CEO Elon Musk's compensation, alongside chair Robyn Denholm. In August 2025, Wilson-Thompson and Denholm voted for the special committee to approve a pay package worth around $29 billion. In December 2025, Reuters reported that since joining the Tesla board, she had made $234 million by cashing Tesla stock awards.
