= Merrell (company) =

American footwear company

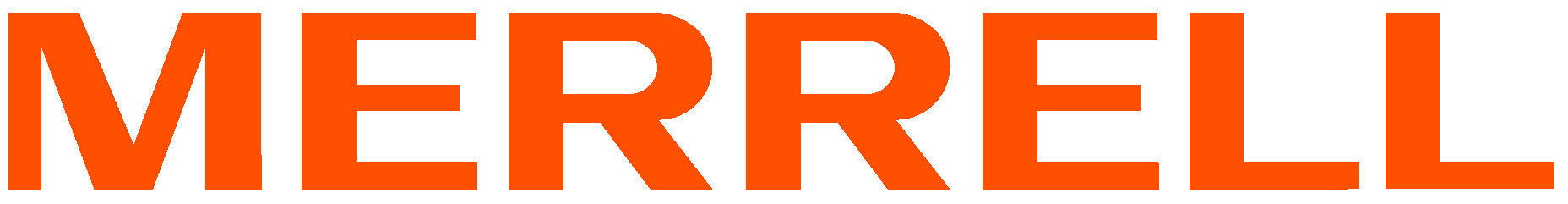
- Company type: Subsidiary
- Industry: Footwear, textile
- Founded: 1981; 45 years ago
- Founders: Clark Matis; Randy Merrell; Lou-Ann Merrell; John Schweizer
- Headquarters: Rockford, Michigan, U.S.
- Key people: Christopher Hufnagel, President
- Products: Hiking boots, athletic shoes, sandals, jackets, knit caps, gloves, t-shirts, hoodies, shorts, and socks, backpacks, stuff sacks and bags.
- Parent: Wolverine World Wide
- Website: merrell.com

Merrell is an American manufacturing company of footwear products. It was founded by Clark Matis, Randy Merrell, and John Schweizer in 1981 as a maker of high-performance hiking boots. Since 1997, the company has been a wholly owned subsidiary of Wolverine World Wide. Products currently commercialized by Merrell include hiking boots, athletic shoes, sandals, jackets, knit caps, gloves, t-shirts, hoodies, shorts, and socks. Other accessories include backpacks, stuff sacks, and bags.

== History ==
=== 1981–1986: Origins ===
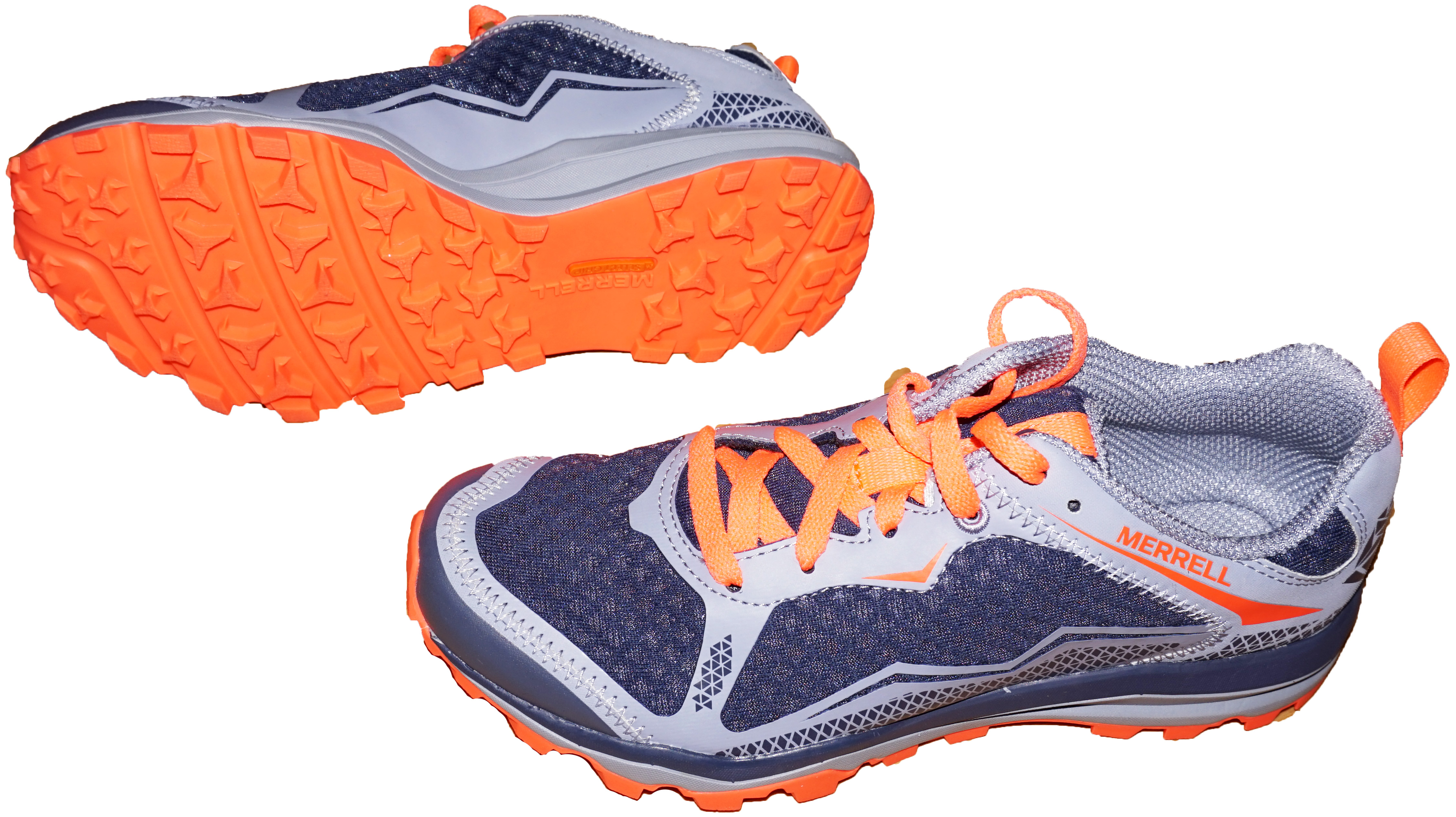
Merrell All Out Crush Light trail running shoes

Merrell was established in 1981 when two executives for the Rossignol ski company, Clark Matis and John Schweizer, launched a new maker of hiking boots. The pair joined forces with Randal Ivan Merrell (R.I. Merrell), a maker of praised custom boots which retailed for $500 a pair. Matis set to work designing a more affordable high-performance boot, which was developed in 1982. Plans were made for production of the new line in factories located in Italy, a leading exporter of footwear to the world market at the time.

In 1983, the new Merrell company delivered its first product to the market, making shipments to a pair of east coast retailers specializing in hiking gear.

In 1986, Randy Merrell sought to return to his previous life as a maker of custom boots and sold his share of the company bearing his name. That same year the company sold its 25,000th pair of boots.

=== 1987–1992: Sale to Karhu ===
In 1987, Merrell was purchased by Karhu. The new owners moved production of Merrell products to Asia, reducing retail prices and expanding sales. In 1988, sales of Merrell products topped the $4 million mark.

A period of rapid growth for Merrell followed with 1989 sales increasing by 50%, to the $6 million mark. By 1990, some 300,000 pairs of shoes and boots were being sold annually, with sales for the year topping the $10 million mark for the first time. The company became a global enterprise, with divisions established in Canada, the United Kingdom, Scandinavia and the United States.

The year 1992 saw another doubling of the company's sales volume, topping the $20 million mark. By the middle of the decade, Merrell products were being sold in 22 countries.

=== 1993–2007: Sale to Wolverine World Wide ===
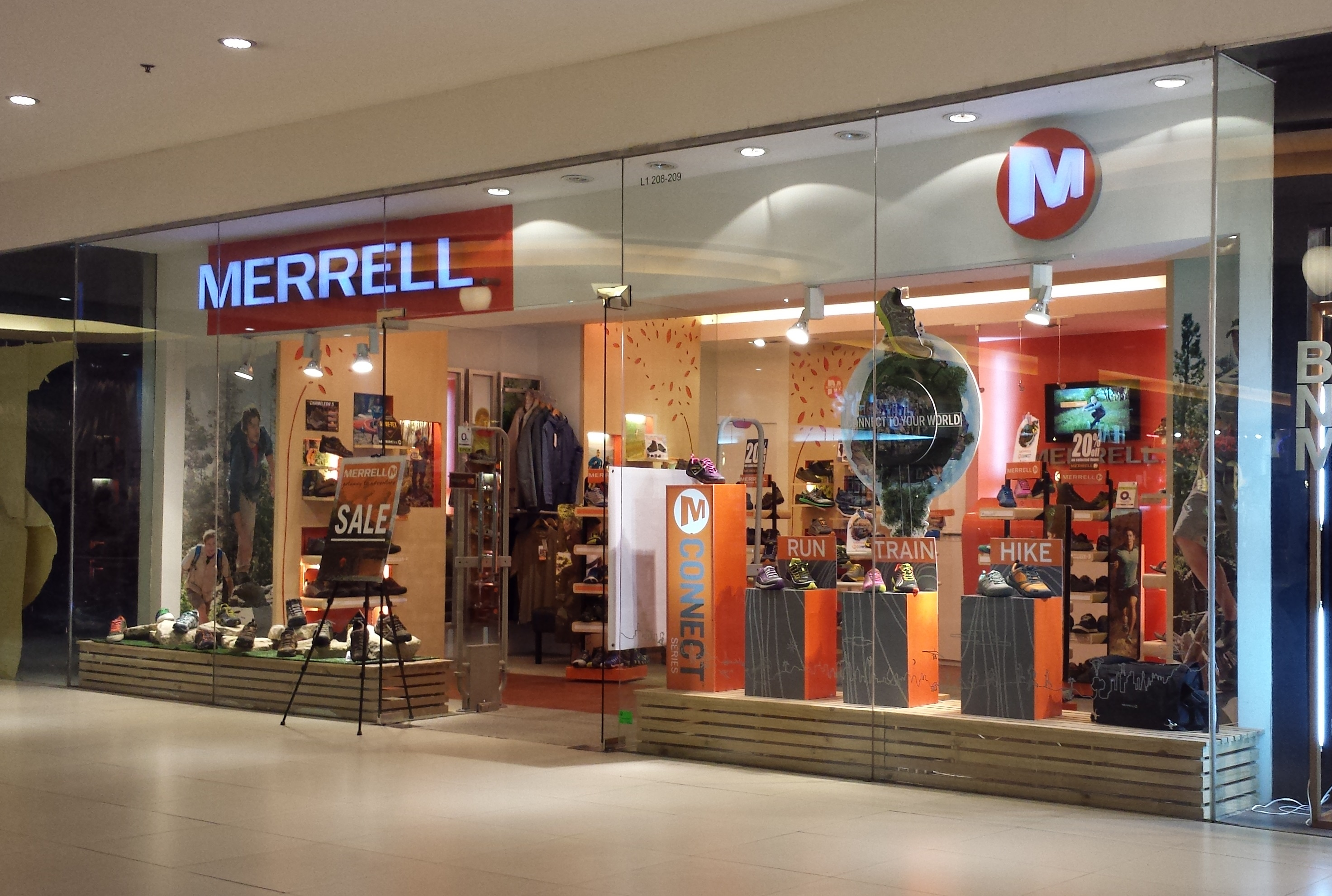
A Merrell storefront in Manila

In 1997, Karhu sold Merrell to Wolverine World Wide, a large footwear corporation which manufactures Hush Puppies shoes and Wolverine brand boots. In the year of the Wolverine acquisition, Merrell sales volume totaled $23 million.

Wolverine introduced a new lighter-weight sensibility to the line, beginning with a trail running shoe called the "Jungle Runner". This initial foray into lightweight footwear was not a commercial success, but a team led by Clark Matis came up with the idea of using a very aggressive trail running outsole with a casual slip-on upper made of pigskin suede, a material previously perfected and used extensively in the Hush Puppies line.

The work of Matis' design group culminated with the introduction of what would become the brand's signature shoe, the "Jungle Moc." The new product was a success, with total shipments of Jungle Mocs hitting 3.5 million pairs by 2002 and 10 million by 2009.

In 2007, the Merrell line was expanded to include apparel and accessories. By 2010, Merrell products were being sold in 151 countries. The brand generates the most revenue in Wolverine World Wide's portfolio.

=== 2008–present ===
On November 30, 2022, Merrell was voted the Brand of the Year at the Footwear News Achievement Awards (FNAA). In the third quarter of sales that ended Oct. 1, 2022, Merrell posted its total revenue of $198.6 million, up 33.6% since the COVID-19 pandemic in 2020.

In 2023, Merrell was rated the top barefoot running shoe for beginners by Wired. The idea behind a minimalist running shoe is less cushioning and support for more foot engagement. Along with the barefoot running shoes, Merrell has been called one of the top beginner hiking boot companies. As stated in The Strategist, The Merrell Moab 3 is "waterproof, sturdy, and relatively affordable ... a classic".

== Sponsorships and philanthropy ==
In 2015, Merrell announced its partnership with Tough Mudder to host over 60 Tough Mudder events in six countries.

In partnership with the National Recreation and Park Association (NRPA), Merrell has created the Changing Nature of Work Award, which sponsors projects related to parks and recreation.

In September 2023, Merrell invited six athletes to run 3.2 miles up the technical dirt hiking trails of Colorado's Steamboat Ski Resort, climbing 2,200 feet with an average grade of 12 percent, with the promise of sponsoring the top male and female to set a new Fastest Known Time (FKT) record. Morgan Elliott's effort was verified as the initial men's "Base to Thunderhead" FKT and Mercedes Siegle-Gaither and Sara Aranda tied for the new women's FKT.
