= Stride Rite Corporation =

American children's footwear store chain

Stride Rite
- Company type: Subsidiary
- Industry: Footwear
- Predecessor: Green Shoe Manufacturing Company
- Founded: 1919; 107 years ago
- Founder: Jacob A. Slosberg; Philip Green
- Headquarters: Waltham, Massachusetts, U.S.
- Products: Children's shoes
- Parent: Payless ShoeSource (2007–2012); Wolverine World Wide (2012–present)
- Website: www.striderite.com

Stride Rite (stylized in all lowercase), formerly the Stride Rite Corporation, is an American children's footwear company. Stride Rite products are marketed globally through brand licensee Vida Shoes International.

== History ==
=== Founding and early years ===
Stride Rite was founded in Boston, Massachusetts, in 1919, as the Green Shoe Manufacturing Company (“Green Shoe”) by Thomas LaLonde, Jacob A. Slosberg, and Philip Green. After founding the company, LaLonde—who owned the name Stride Rite—and Philip Green sold their interest to Slosberg twelve years later, and Slosberg's sons Samuel and Charles led up the company as the heads of sales and manufacturing respectively. Green Shoe became a public company in 1960 and was listed on the New York Stock Exchange.

In 1966, Green Shoe adopted the Stride Rite Corporation name to emphasize the brand name of one of its best-known products. The name was purchased from Tom Lalonde in 1933.

In 1968, Arnold Hiatt, the son of a Lithuanian immigrant, became president of the firm. That year, annual sales totaled $35 million. Hiatt pursued a policy of acquisitions to keep the firm in tune with consumer preferences.

=== Acquisitions and expansion ===
Stride Rite's first retail store was opened in 1972. In 1979, Stride Rite purchased brands Sperry Top-Sider and Keds from Uniroyal. Stride Rite purchased Toddler University in 1994. During 2005, Stride Rite completed its acquisition of Saucony, and purchased Robeez a year later.

Hiatt was instrumental in bringing in socially conscious business methods such as opening a day care center in 1971, as well as a Senior Day Care center for parents of employees, banning smoking in 1986, and sponsoring 40 inner-city youth to attend Harvard University, Hiatt's alma mater. In 1992, Hiatt stepped down as chairman to pursue philanthropy through the company's foundation, and he has become an advocate for electoral reform.

=== Collective Brands ===
In 2007, Payless ShoeSource of Topeka, Kansas acquired Stride Rite. On August 16, 2007, the company changed its name to Collective Brands, Inc. By 2009, it was announced that Stride Rite would operate under the further-revised name of Collective Brands Performance + Lifestyle Group.

=== Wolverine World Wide ===
On May 1, 2012, Stride Rite, Keds, Sperry Top-Sider, and Saucony became part of Wolverine World Wide after a joint agreement with Blum Capital Partners and Golden Gate Capital acquired the Performance Lifestyle Group of Collective Brands for US$1.23 billion.

== Stride Rite stores ==
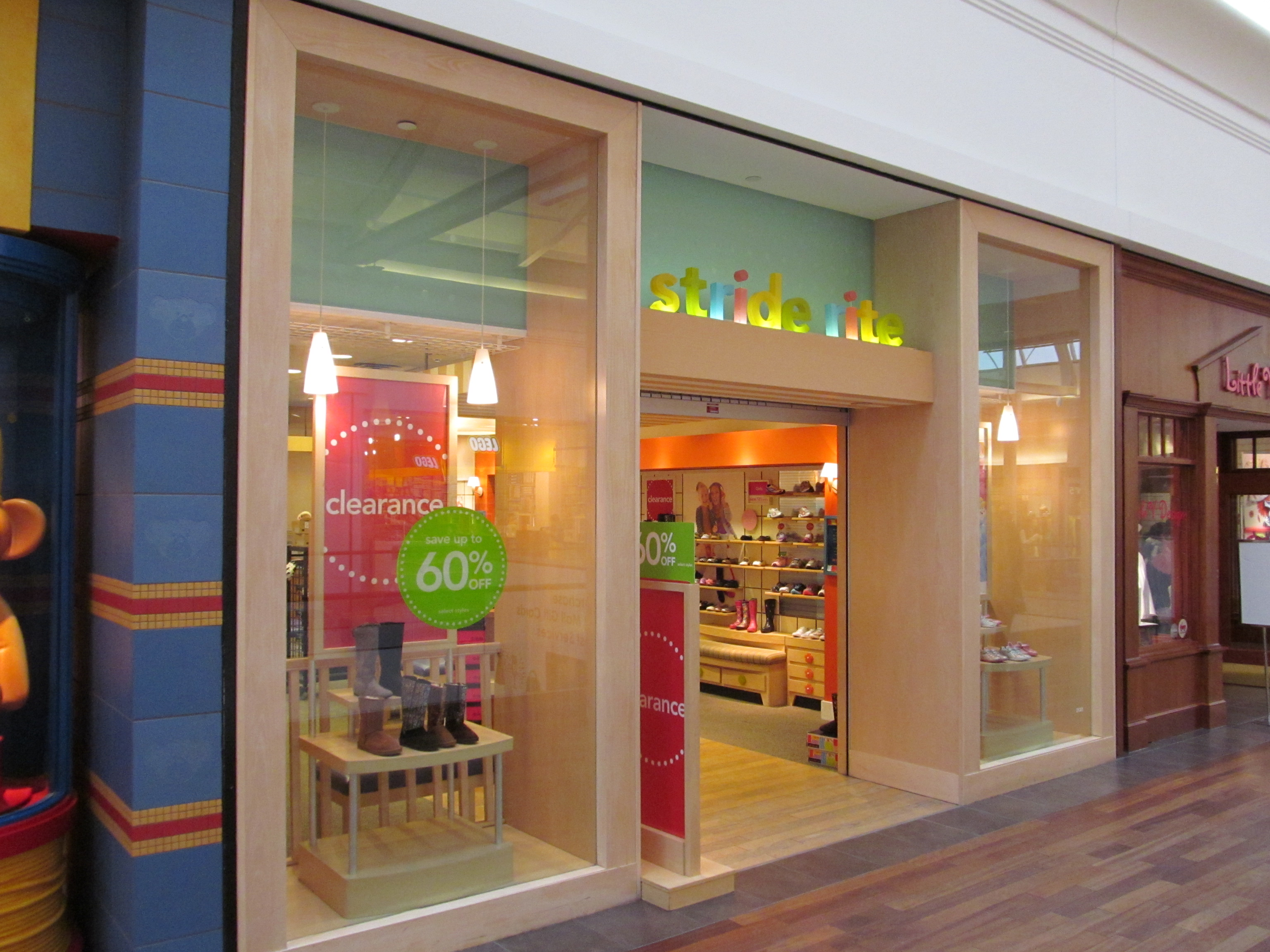
Stride Rite at the Natick Mall

Stride Rite retail stores are primarily located in larger regional shopping centers, generally clustered in the major marketing areas of the United States. The number of retail stores, as of 2012, by type for the Stride Rite Retail segment is represented in the table below.

Stride Rite children's stores	Outlet stores	Leased children's shoe departments	Total Stride Rite retail stores
231	102	7 (at Macy's)	340

== See also ==
- Arnold Hiatt
- Wolverine World Wide
