= Hill-Norton =

Hill-Norton is a surname.

Notable people with this surname include:

- Nicholas Hill-Norton (born 1939), retired British naval officer
- Peter Hill-Norton (1915–2004), British naval officer
- Tamara Hill-Norton, Simon Hill-Norton, founders of the Sweaty Betty clothing retail chain
