= Arnold Hiatt =

Arnold Selig Hiatt
- Born: May 26, 1927 (age 98); Worcester, Massachusetts, United States
- Education: Harvard College
- Occupations: Businessman, Electoral reformer
- Employer: Stride Rite

Arnold Hiatt is an American businessman who was the president of the Stride Rite footwear company. He was a large contributor to political campaigns for the Democratic Party as well as being a voice calling for money to get out of politics. He has called for serious electoral reform and public financing of elections. Hiatt was praised by Harvard Law School professor Lawrence Lessig for his stance on electoral reform.

== Stride Rite ==
Hiatt was the son of a Lithuanian immigrant. A graduate of the Class of 1944, Arnold attended Worcester Academy for twelve months straight in order to join the U. S. Army in the Second World War. After college, he began as a shoe salesman and worked himself up the corporate ladder. He joined Stride Rite in 1967 when it acquired a children's shoe company named Blue Star, when sales were $35 million a year. In 1968, Hiatt became president; by 1992, Stride Rite was earning more than $600 million. Hiatt was able to anticipate changes in consumer preferences for footwear, and adapted to major changes by acquiring firms with in-demand products.

Hiatt pioneered socially conscious methods such as opening a company sponsored day care center in 1971, at a time when such a move was considered "radically countercultural." In 1986, smoking of cigarettes, cigars and pipes was banned from the corporation. And his firm provides scholarships for 40 inner-city youth to attend Harvard University.

According to The New York Times, the company has achieved a consistent return on investment to place it among the "top 1 percent of companies" listed on the New York Stock Exchange with compounded annual growth of 46 percent.

Stride Rite was acquired by Payless ShoeSource in 2007.

== Advocacy of electoral reform ==
According to Harvard Law School professor Lawrence Lessig, in 1996 Hiatt advocated to then-president Bill Clinton that the president work hard to try to end "private funding of public elections", but Hiatt was repudiated by Clinton. In 2007, Hiatt wrote:

Clearly, the way we finance elections is undermining our democracy. The current campaign finance system forces good people to spend far too much time talking to narrow slices of our society and at the expense of focusing on the nation's business. Only the wealthiest citizens or special interests can provide the enormous amounts of money required to run for or stay in office. Even the most trusting among us must recognize the potentially corrupting incentives that this creates.

— Arnold Hiatt, writing in the Boston Globe, 2007

Hiatt has urged passage of the Senate Fair Elections Now Act introduced by Senators Dick Durbin and Arlen Specter, which is a bipartisan proposal to raise a "large number of small donations to show their credibility with the public" before qualifying for public funding for their campaigns.
