= Richard Blum =

Richard Blum may refer to:

- Richard C. Blum (1935–2022), American investment banker and husband of Dianne Feinstein
- Richard Manitoba (Richard Blum, born 1954), American musician with the MC5 and The Dictators
