= American Himalayan Foundation =

US-based non-profit organization

- Formation: 1981
- Founder: Richard C. Blum
- Type: International organization
- Purpose: AHF works to bring life-changing education, healthcare, and opportunity for Tibetans, Sherpas, and Nepalis across the Himalaya.
- Headquarters: San Francisco
- Region served: Nepal
- Website: www.himalayan-foundation.org

The American Himalayan Foundation (AHF) is a non-profit organization in the United States that helps Tibetans, Sherpas, and Nepalis living throughout the Himalayas. AHF builds schools, plants trees, trains doctors, funds hospitals, takes care of children and the elderly, and restores sacred sites. The San Francisco-based organization also helps Tibetans rebuild and maintain their culture both in exile and inside Tibet.

It was founded by Richard C. Blum. The late Sir Edmund Hillary was a Director of the foundation for more than 20 years.

== Overview ==
The American Himalayan Foundation was established by San Francisco financier Richard Blum after his first trip through the mountains of Nepal in 1968. During this trip, he developed an interest in the local people and the poverty in which they lived. Blum started helping Sherpa children informally, and in 1980 he set up the American Himalayan Foundation (AHF). Because many people in Nepal and Tibet live without healthcare, education, clean water, or bridges connecting remote villages; Blum created the foundation to address these problems.

The foundation's first partner was Sir Edmund Hillary, assisting the Sherpas through his Himalayan Trust. Also in the early years, the 14th Dalai Lama requested that AHF help the growing number of Tibetan refugees in Nepal and India. AHF has provided education, healthcare, and basic assistance to Tibetans for over 20 years. As AHF grew, the 501(c)(3) charity continued to work with the Sherpas and Tibetans in exile, but expanded its geographic reach to people throughout Nepal, inside Tibet, and in Bhutan. The foundation helps the most vulnerable: poor children and the elderly, girls in remote villages at risk of being trafficked, disabled children, refugees, and people in need of medical care.

All AHF-supported projects involve community participation, in order to build local capacity and to ensure the foundation is responding to community needs. Funds are not used to pay for western volunteers. All the donations raised by the foundation go directly to helping Sherpas, Nepalis, and Tibetans inside Tibet and in exile.

== Projects ==
AHF supports over 150 projects throughout the Himalayas and touches the lives of 300,000 people each year. The foundation provides healthcare through community clinics, the training of local healthcare workers, and the Hospital and Rehabilitation Center for Disabled Children in Banepa. AHF educates over fifteen thousand children a year, including ten thousand girls who would otherwise be vulnerable to being trafficked to brothels in India. The foundation developed the Tibetan Enterprise Fund to help Tibetan refugees in Nepal and India, who lack the same rights as citizens, start income generating businesses. AHF also supports orphanages, day care centers for the very young, care for the disabled, and clean water systems and bridges for nomads in Tibet. Beginning in 1995, the organization was involved with the restoration of 15th century Tibetan Buddhist monasteries in the former Kingdom of Mustang and is also extensively involved with humanitarian work in Mustang.

== See also ==
- Himalayan Trust
