= Private investment in public equity =

Private investment

A private investment in public equity, commonly known as a PIPE deal, involves selling of publicly traded common shares or some form of preferred stock or convertible security to private investors. It is an allocation of shares in a public company not through a public offering in a stock exchange. PIPE deals are part of the primary market. In the U.S., a PIPE offering may be registered with the Securities and Exchange Commission on a registration statement or may be completed as an unregistered private placement.

== PIPE market ==
The attractiveness of PIPE transactions has waxed and waned since the late 1990s. For private equity investors, PIPEs tend to become increasingly attractive in markets where control investments are harder to execute. Generally, companies are forced to pursue PIPEs when capital markets are unwilling to provide financing and traditional equity market alternatives do not exist for that particular issuer.

According to market research in the US, 980 transactions have closed totaling $88.3 billion in gross proceeds during the nine months ended September 30, 2008, putting the market on pace for yet another record year.” This compares with 1,106 such deals in 2000, raising $24.3 billion and 1,301 PIPE deals in the U.S. raising a total of $20 billion in 2005. In recent years, top Wall Street investment banks have become increasingly involved in the PIPE market as placement agents. In a recent global study of PIPEs, analysing more than 10,000 PIPEs the world (PIPEs issued in 37 countries), firms raised $396 billion via PIPEs between 1995 and 2015, two thirds of which was raised by non-US firms.

During the 2008 financial crisis, in September 2008, PIPE transactions provided quick access to capital at a reasonable transaction cost for companies that might otherwise have been unable to access the public equity markets. Recently, many hedge funds have turned away from investing into restricted illiquid investments. Some investors, including Warren Buffett found PIPEs attractive because they could purchase shares or equity-linked securities at a discount to the public market price and because it had provided an investor the opportunity to acquire a sizable position at a fixed or variable price rather than pushing the price of a stock higher through its own open market purchases.

Existing investors tend to have mixed reactions to PIPE offerings as the PIPE is often highly dilutive and destructive to the existing shareholder base. Depending upon the terms of the transaction, a PIPE may dilute existing shareholders' equity ownership, particularly if the seller has agreed to provide the investors with downside protections against market price declines (a death spiral), which can lead to issuance of more shares to the PIPE investors for no more money.

The SEC has pursued certain PIPE investments (primarily involving hedge-funds) as violating U.S. federal securities laws. The controversy has largely involved hedge funds that use PIPE securities to cover shares that the fund shorted in anticipation of the PIPE offering. In these instances, the SEC has shown that the fund knew about the upcoming offering (in which it would be involved) prior to shorting shares.

== PIPEs and mergers and acquisitions ==
Many reverse mergers are accompanied by a simultaneous PIPE transaction, which is typically undertaken by smaller public companies. Shares are sold at a slight discount to the public market price, and the company typically agrees to use its best efforts to register the resale of those same securities for the benefit of the purchaser.

== Regulation ==
The regulatory environment in certain countries, including the United States, Australia, Canada, and the United Kingdom are accommodating for PIPE transactions. However, in certain areas, there are stated preferences for rights issues, which allow existing shareholders an opportunity to invest before the company seeks outside capital. In these jurisdictions, once a company has completed a rights offering, it may pursue a PIPE transaction.

== See also ==
- Stock
- Preferred stock
- Private equity
- Strategic block investing
- Public offering
- Alternative public offering
- Public offering without listing
- Co-investments
