= Strategic block investing =

Strategic block investing is a hybrid investment strategy generally used by fund managers who aim to play a constructive, active role in unlocking value from public companies through the implementation of financial, operational and governance initiatives from both minority and control positions. Strategic block investors tend to focus on publicly quoted companies but may also pursue more traditional private equity strategies.

The style and level of engagement by strategic block investors varies. The majority position themselves as “company-friendly” and operate with a high level of engagement. A strategic block fund manager identifies undervalued companies, purchases a substantial block of shares in these companies (of either existing or newly issued equity) and then uses this holding to focus the attention of the incumbent management on increasing shareholder value. Some strategic block funds will intend on gaining board representation and most will work proactively with management, the board and shareholders on major issues of strategy, capital structure, management and performance. Some strategic block investors are prepared to take aggressive action if their proposals for improving shareholder value are not actioned. Strategic block investors will typically focus their investments in relatively few companies.

Most strategic block investors employ some of the skills traditionally used by private equity investors, however unlike private equity investors, they specialise in dealing with listed companies, often from a position of minority or sometimes majority ownership. In order to gain a sufficient minority position in an investee of more than 5%, some strategic block funds will monitor shifts in shareholder ownership to take advantage of out-of-favour or neglected situations that can often offer highly compelling entry valuations, while others will prefer the placement of new equity.

According to a study by The Journal of Finance, activist block share purchases with the announced intention of influencing firm policies are followed by increases in profitability and abnormal stock appreciation. Moreover, share prices tend to rise irrespective of whether divestitures followed.

== Companies ==
Richard C. Blum established Blum Capital Partners in San Francisco, which pioneered company-friendly strategic block investing in 1975.

Other US-based firms include Sageview Capital LP in Palo Alto, Blue Harbour Group LP in Greenwich, Connecticut, Prides Capital in Boston, Hale Capital Partners in New York and Accretive Capital Partners in Madison, Connecticut.

In the UK and Europe, five firms are known to manage dedicated strategic block investment funds, namely Cevian Capital with offices in Stockholm, Zurich and London, 3i based in London, SVG Capital based in London, CapMan Public Market based in Helsinki and NIPA Capital based in the Netherlands.

The only known specialist in the Asia-Pacific region is Co-Investor Capital Partners. Formed in 2004, Co-Investor has offices in Sydney and Singapore. HighPoint Capital (formerly Hyperion Capital) is also based in Sydney and undertakes strategic block investing alongside its traditional private equity investing.

Media commentary has highlighted the differences between company-friendly strategic block investors and shareholder activists who are prepared to take aggressive action to achieve their targeted investment returns.

On 23 March 2006, The Boston Business Journal referred to the company-friendly exponents as the "anti-raiders".

On 4 June 2006 The Financial Times stated "...there is a fundamental difference between their tactics and those of Blue Harbour and Sageview, who exert a level of pressure on managements, but without engaging in proxy fights. Instead, they look at companies through what they describe as a 'private equity lens' identifying targets that are undervalued and could do with some form of transformation, whether in the form of balance sheet restructuring, the disposal of certain assets or the sale of the entire company."
