= Sperry (brand) =

American footwear brand

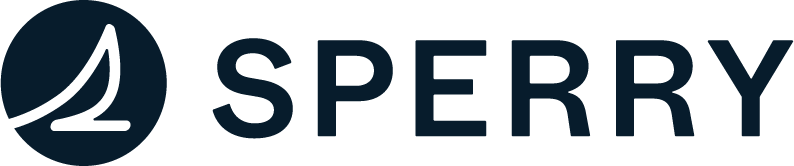
- Type: Subsidiary
- Industry: Footwear; Sportswear; Sports equipment
- Founded: 1935; 91 years ago
- Founder: Paul A. Sperry
- Headquarters: Waltham, Massachusetts, United States
- Area served: Worldwide
- Products: Boating shoes Apparel
- Parent: Authentic Brands Group
- Website: sperry.com

Sperry or Sperry Top-Sider is an American brand of boat shoe designed in 1935 by Paul A. Sperry. Sperrys, or Top-Siders, were the first boat shoes introduced into the boating and footwear markets. It is currently owned by Authentic Brands Group, with the North America operations licensed to Aldo group.

== History ==
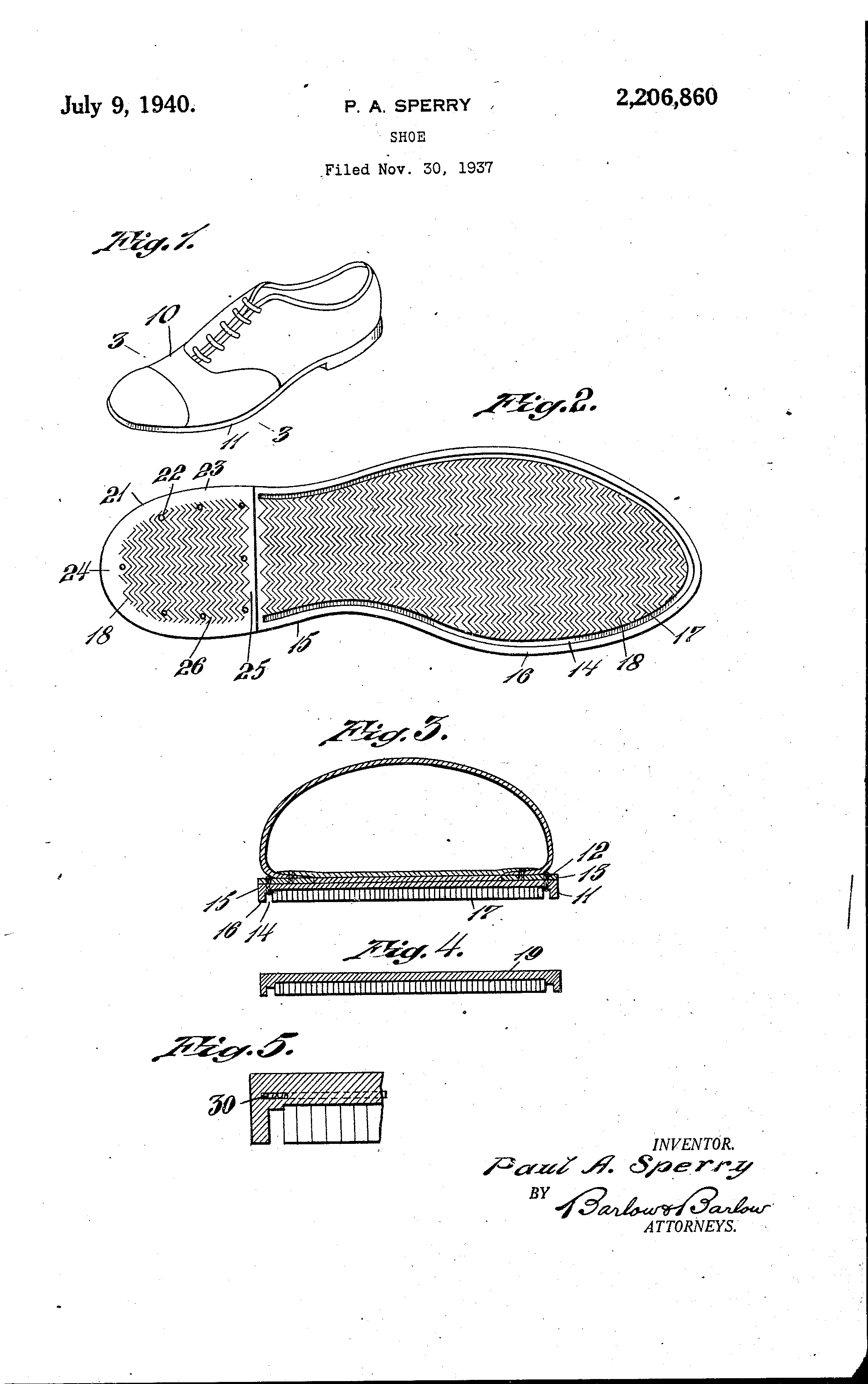
Sperry's 1937 patent application for what became a new category of footwear, the boat shoe

While sailing on the Long Island Sound, inventor and sailor Paul A. Sperry slipped on the deck of his boat and fell overboard. He was able to pull himself back on board, but the experience drove him to develop a non-slip shoe for boating. While experimenting, he noticed his Cocker Spaniel's ability to run down an icy hill without slipping. Examining its paws, he noticed traction-enhancing grooves, which he sought to mimic by cutting a pattern of them into a natural rubber sole utilizing a process known as siping.

The Sperry "Top-Sider" boat shoe that was introduced in 1935 featured a canvas upper, herringbone siping, and a white outsole to prevent the shoe from leaving dark scuff marks on a boat's deck. The Commonwealth Shoe and Leather Co. later partnered with Sperry on a design using specially tanned water-resistant leather, which became the familiar Sperry "boat shoe". Sperry's shoes remained a niche product for boaters until 1939 when the US Navy negotiated the right to manufacture the shoe for its sailors at the United States Naval Academy. As a result of this increased production, Sperry sold the brand to the US Rubber Co. in 1940. In 1979 the Stride Rite Corporation purchased both Sperry and Keds from US Rubber. In 2007, Payless ShoeSource acquired Sperry Top-Sider as part of a multi-brand acquisition. The company was purchased, along with the other brands from Payless's Collective Brands Performance and Lifestyle Group portfolio, in 2012 by Wolverine World Wide and Blum Capital Partners for US$1.23 billion.

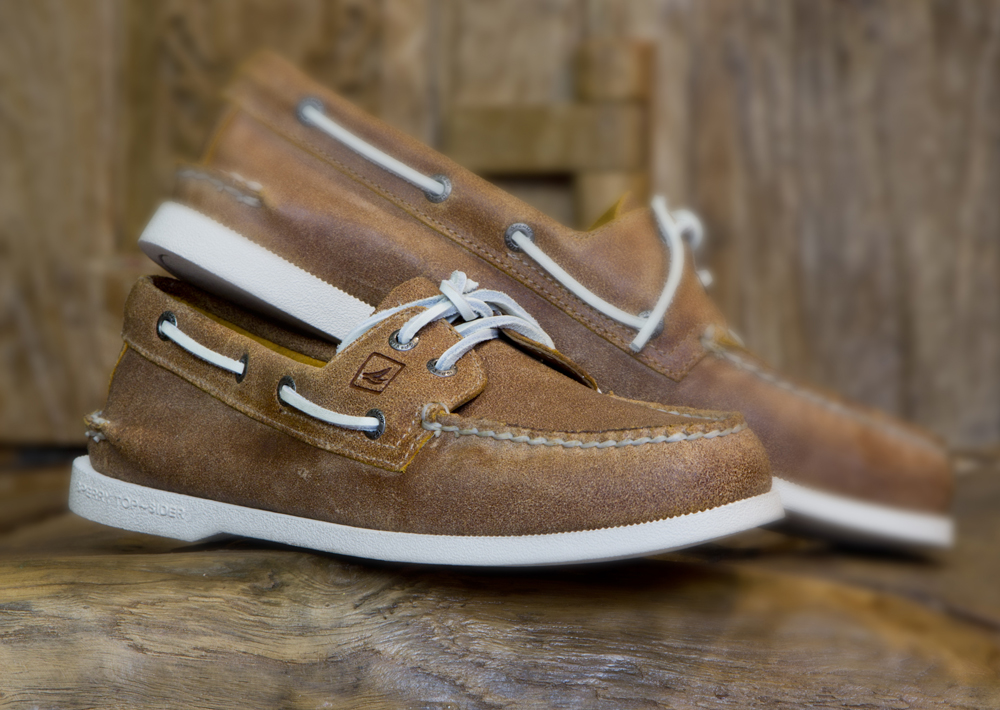
A pair of Sperry "Authentic Original" boat shoes

In 2009, Footwear News named Sperry Top-Sider the Brand of the Year.

In early 2015, Sperry announced that the brand had dropped the defining trait "Top-Sider" name from the company as part of the footwear company's new brand campaign. Since 2021, Sperry has opened 2 specialty stores and 40 outlet stores across the United States.

In May 2023, Wolverine World Wide announced the search for "strategic alternatives" for the Sperry brand, as part of a broader move to focus on growth sectors.

In January 2024, Wolverine World Wide announced the sale of Sperry to Authentic Brands Group who in turn is licensing the brand to the Aldo Group for North American operations. Sperry's year-on-year sales for the quarter ending September 30 had fallen 41.4%. The sale to Authentic Brands Group generated proceeds of around $130 million. The Aldo Group plans to open 23 Sperry stores in the North American market.

== Sponsorships ==
=== US Sailing Team Sperry ===
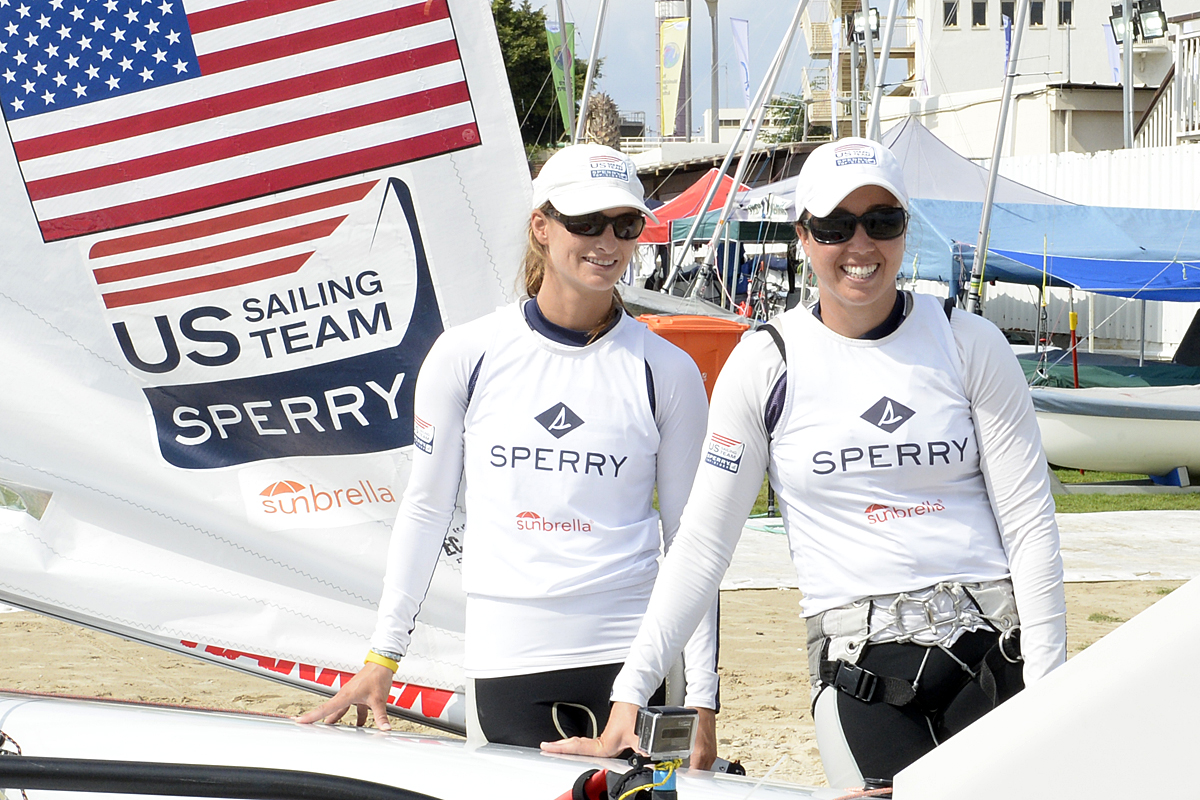
US Sailing Team Sperry athletes ahead of the 2015 470 World Championships

Sperry is the official footwear sponsor of the US Sailing Team Sperry, the US Junior Olympic Sailing Team and the US Paralympics Sailing Team.

=== America's Cup ===
In 1987, Sperry Top-Sider served as the official sponsor of the America's Cup World Series. Sperry shoes were worn by champion sailor Dennis Conner during the race. Sperry served as the footwear sponsor for the America's Cup sailing tournament for several years, but later began to sponsor other sailing events.

In 2015, Sperry became the official footwear partner of the 35th America's Cup and the official footwear supplier for Oracle Team USA.

In 2016, Sperry also became the official footwear supplier of SoftBank Team Japan. Through their America's Cup partnership, Sperry announced that they would collaborate with athletes to create custom footwear to wear during the competition.
