= Wolverine World Wide =

American footwear manufacturer

Wolverine World Wide, Inc.
- Trade name: Wolverine Worldwide
- Type: Public
- Traded as: NYSE: WWW; S&P 600 component
- Industry: Apparel; Accessories
- Founded: 1883; 143 years ago
- Founders: G. A. Krause; Fredrick Hirth
- Headquarters: Rockford, Michigan, U.S.
- Key people: Chris Hufnagel (CEO)
- Products: Footwear, apparel, accessories, sportswear
- Brands: Bates; Cat Footwear; Chaco; Harley-Davidson Footwear; Hush Puppies; Hytest; Merrell; Saucony; Stride Rite (licensed); Sweaty Betty; Wolverine Boots and Shoes
- Revenue: ▲US$1.87 billion (2025)
- Net income: ▲US$95.8 million (2025)
- Number of employees: 4,300
- Website: wolverineworldwide.com

Wolverine World Wide, Inc. (doing business as Wolverine Worldwide) is a publicly traded American footwear manufacturer based in Rockford, Michigan. The shoemaker is known for its eponymous brand, Wolverine Boots and Shoes, as well as other brands, such as Hush Puppies, Chaco, and Merrell. The company also manufactures licensed footwear for other firms, such as Caterpillar and Harley-Davidson.

== History ==
=== Founding and early years ===
Fredrick Hirth and G. A. Krause founded the company in 1883. Hirth and Krause bought a small leather shop in Grand Rapids, Michigan, starting with a capital investment of $2,900. In 1901, they built a plant in Rockford Michigan, just north of Grand Rapids. They purchased and expanded the Rogue River Electric Light and Power Company to power their new plant and the city of Rockford. In 1903, operations began and in 1908, a tannery followed. The company thus processed its own raw materials and manufactured its own shoes sold through the Hirth-Krause Company. In 1921 the company changed its name to Wolverine Shoe and Tanning Corporation. During the period 1916-1923 its earnings increased 700%.

In 1941, during World War II, the Wolverine Shoe and Tanning Company began to work for the U.S. Navy, developing pigskin gloves and inventing what later became known as pigskin suede.

=== Name change and acquisitions ===
In 1964, the company changed its name to Wolverine World Wide, Inc. and in 1965 became a publicly traded company listed on the New York Stock Exchange. Hush Puppies, a casual footwear brand founded by the company in 1958, quickly rose to popularity in the 1960s.

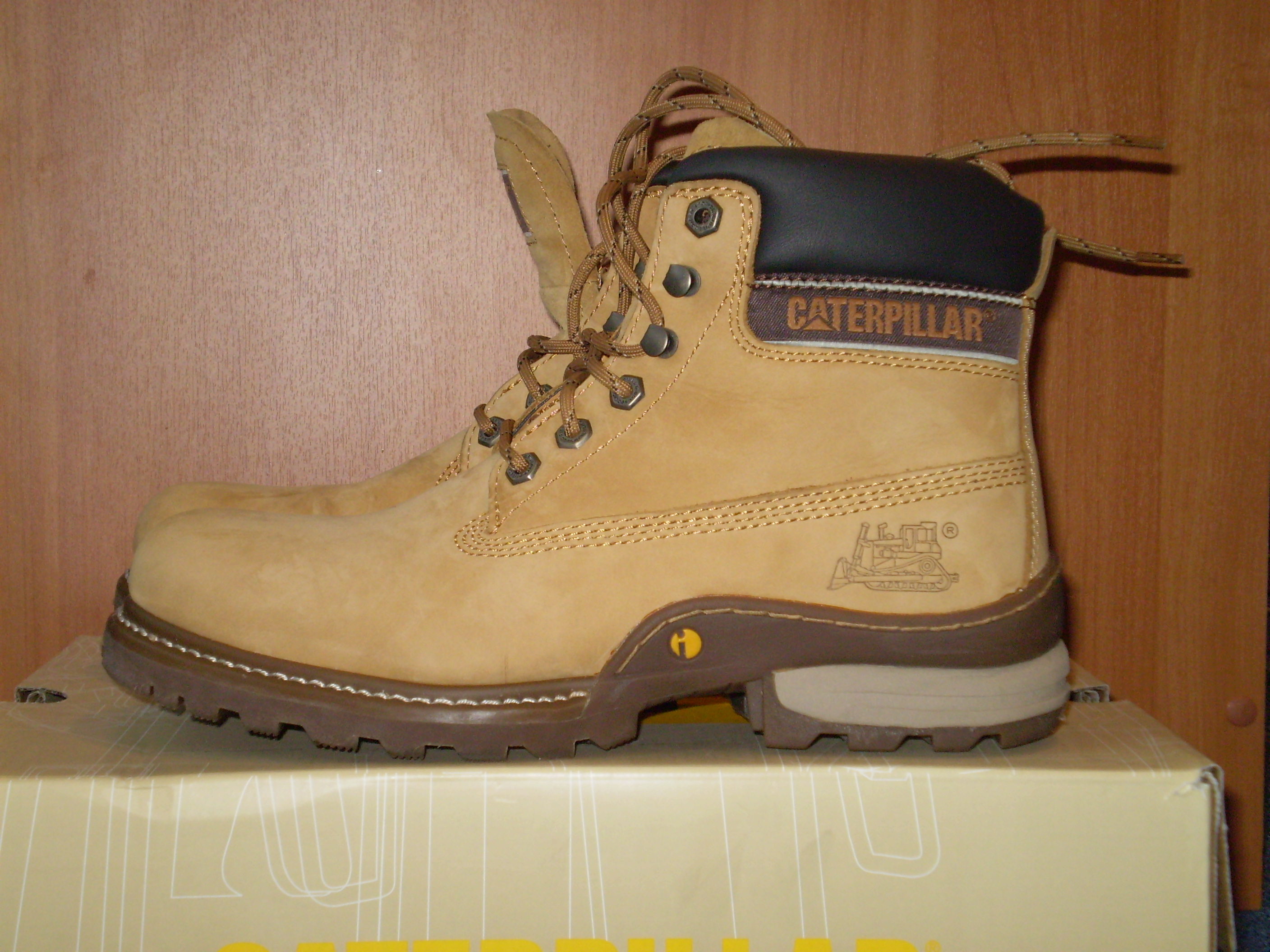
Caterpillar-branded work boots manufactured by Wolverine World Wide

In 1994, Wolverine World Wide introduced Cat Footwear, a licensed brand of shoes using the Caterpillar Inc. name.

In 1995, the Council of Fashion Designers of America voted Hush Puppies as Fashion Accessory of the Year.

In 1996, the UK wholesale business for Hush Puppies was acquired from Sears plc, who had been selling Hush Puppies in the United Kingdom. Sears' Hush Puppies retail business was sold to Stylo plc at the same time.

In 1997, Wolverine World Wide continued expanding by purchasing the Merrell brand. A year later, the company acquired the global license for footwear from the Harley-Davidson Motor Company.

Wolverine World Wide acquisitions in the 2000s included the 2003 purchase of Sebago and 2009 purchases of Chaco and the UK-based brand Cushe. The company discontinued the Cushe brand in 2015 and sold Sebago to Italian publicly traded company BasicNet in 2017.

In 2006, Wolverine World Wide entered into a global footwear licensing deal with Patagonia, Inc. The company stopped production of Patagonia footwear in 2014.

=== 2012–present ===
Wolverine World Wide nearly doubled in size after its 2012 acquisition of the Performance Lifestyle Group of Collective Brands, which added Saucony, Keds, Stride Rite and Sperry brands to its portfolio. The US$1.23 billion transaction also involved the sale of Payless ShoeSource and Collective Licensing International to private equity firms Blum Capital Partners and Golden Gate Capital. In 2017, the company sold its United States Department of Defense footwear business along with a factory in Big Rapids, Michigan to Tennessee-based footwear manufacturer Original Footwear. In the same year, Wolverine World Wide converted Stride Rite to a licensed brand operated by New York City-based Vida Shoes International.

The company is based out of corporate offices in Rockford, Michigan and Waltham, Massachusetts. Wolverine World Wide also operates three distribution centers in the United States, one in Canada and one in the Netherlands. As of December 29, 2018, Wolverine World Wide operated 80 retail stores in the U.S. and Canada and 42 consumer-direct eCommerce sites. According to the company's 2018 annual report, "substantially all of the units sourced by the Company are procured from numerous third-party manufacturers in the Asia Pacific region. The Company maintains offices in the Asia Pacific region to develop and facilitate sourcing strategies."

Wolverine World Wide operated various PFAS dumpsites throughout Belmont and Rockford that contaminated the drinking water of hundreds of residents. The chemicals involved have been linked to various negative health effects, including several cancers. In February 2020, the company settled Grand Rapids federal court action by agreeing to pay US$69.5 million to provide town-supplied drinking water to affected residents.

In 2019, Wolverine World Wide reorganized into two operating segments:

- Wolverine Michigan Group, whose brands include Bates, Cat Footwear, Chaco, Harley-Davidson Footwear, Hush Puppies, HyTest, Merrell and Wolverine
- Wolverine Boston Group, whose brands include Keds, Saucony, Sperry Top-Sider, the Stride Rite licensed business and the kids footwear businesses of Cat, Hush Puppies, Keds, Merrell, Saucony and Sperry

In 2021, Wolverine World Wide acquired British athleisure retailer Sweaty Betty, In 2023, the company sold Keds to Designer Brands. A year later, Wolverine World Wide sold Sperry to Authentic Brands Group.

== Brands ==
- Bates: Military, tactical, and security footwear and apparel
- Cat: Licensed work boots and apparel
- Chaco: Sandals, clogs, and boots
- Harley-Davidson: Licensed motorcycle boots and apparel
- Hush Puppies: Formal and casual footwear and apparel
- Hytest: Safety work boots
- Merrell: Trail running footwear and apparel
- Saucony: Running shoes and apparel
- Stride Rite: Children's footwear and apparel
- Sweaty Betty: Women's fitness apparel
- Wolverine: Work boots and apparel
