= Payless (footwear retailer) =

American discount footwear company

Payless ShoeSource Worldwide, LLC
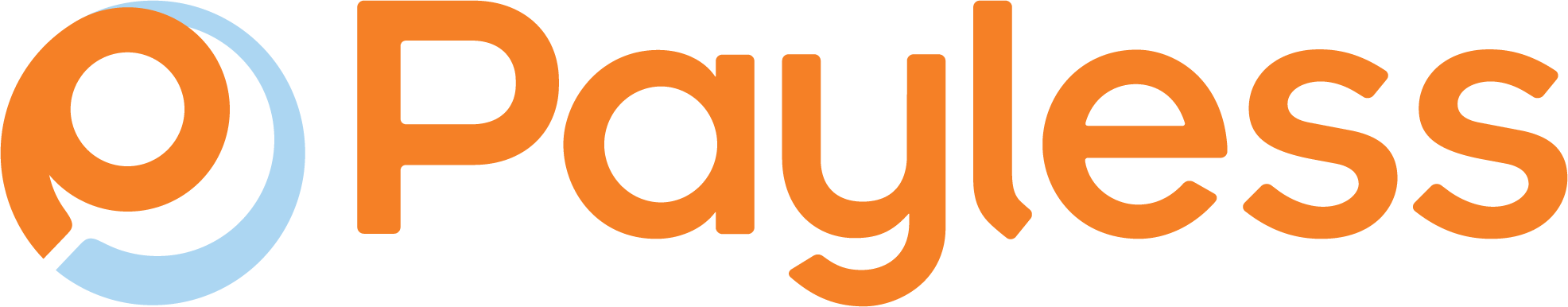
- Formerly: Payless ShoeSource Inc.
- Type: Private
- Industry: Shoes, socks, accessories
- Founded: 1956; 70 years ago
- Founders: Louis and Shaol Pozez
- Fate: U.S. and Canadian stores liquidated due to Chapter 11 bankruptcy Relaunched in August 2020
- Headquarters: 735 NE 125th St, North Miami, Florida, United States
- Number of locations: 3,500+ (40 countries) (2018)
- Area served: 30+ countries (2019)
- Key people: Justo Fuentes (CEO)
- Revenue: ▲US$3 billion (2017)
- Net income: −US$149.8 million (FY2012)
- Owners: Alden Global Capital; Axar Capital Management
- Number of employees: 18,000 (2017)
- Website: www.payless.com

Payless ShoeSource Worldwide, LLC (more commonly known as Payless ShoeSource), is an American multinational discount footwear chain. Established in 1956 by cousins Louis and Shaol Pozez. Payless was a privately held company owned by Blum Capital, and Golden Gate Capital. In 1961, it became a public company as the Volume Shoe Corporation, which merged with The May Department Stores Company in 1979. In the 1980s, Payless was widely known in the U.S. for its Pro Wings line of discount sneakers, which often had Velcro straps instead of laces. In 1996, Payless became an independent publicly held company. In 2004, Payless announced it would exit the Parade chain and would close 100 Payless Shoe outlets. On August 17, 2007, the company acquired the Stride Rite Corporation and changed its name to Collective Brands, Inc. As of 2020, Payless is owned by a group of investors led by Alden Global Capital and Axar Capital Management.

It was announced on May 1, 2012, that the company would be purchased by Wolverine World Wide, Blum Capital, and Golden Gate Capital for US$1.32 billion. On December 13, 2016 it was reported that all Payless shoe stores in Australia were to be closed with the loss of 730 jobs. On July 14, 2014, Authentic Brands Group acquired some assets from Payless's division Collective Licensing International, LLC, which included brands such as Airwalk, Hind sports clothing, Vision Street Wear, and Above The Rim.

In 2019, North American stores including their e-commerce platform filed for bankruptcy. The filing excluded stores outside of North America, which would continue to operate. Payless emerged from bankruptcy on January 16, 2020, and on August 18, 2020, Payless officially dropped 'ShoeSource' from its name, and launched its e-commerce website. Despite this, Philippines and Barbados has opened Payless ShoeSource stores over the few years.

== History ==
Former Payless ShoeSource logo used until 2006.

=== Acquisitions ===
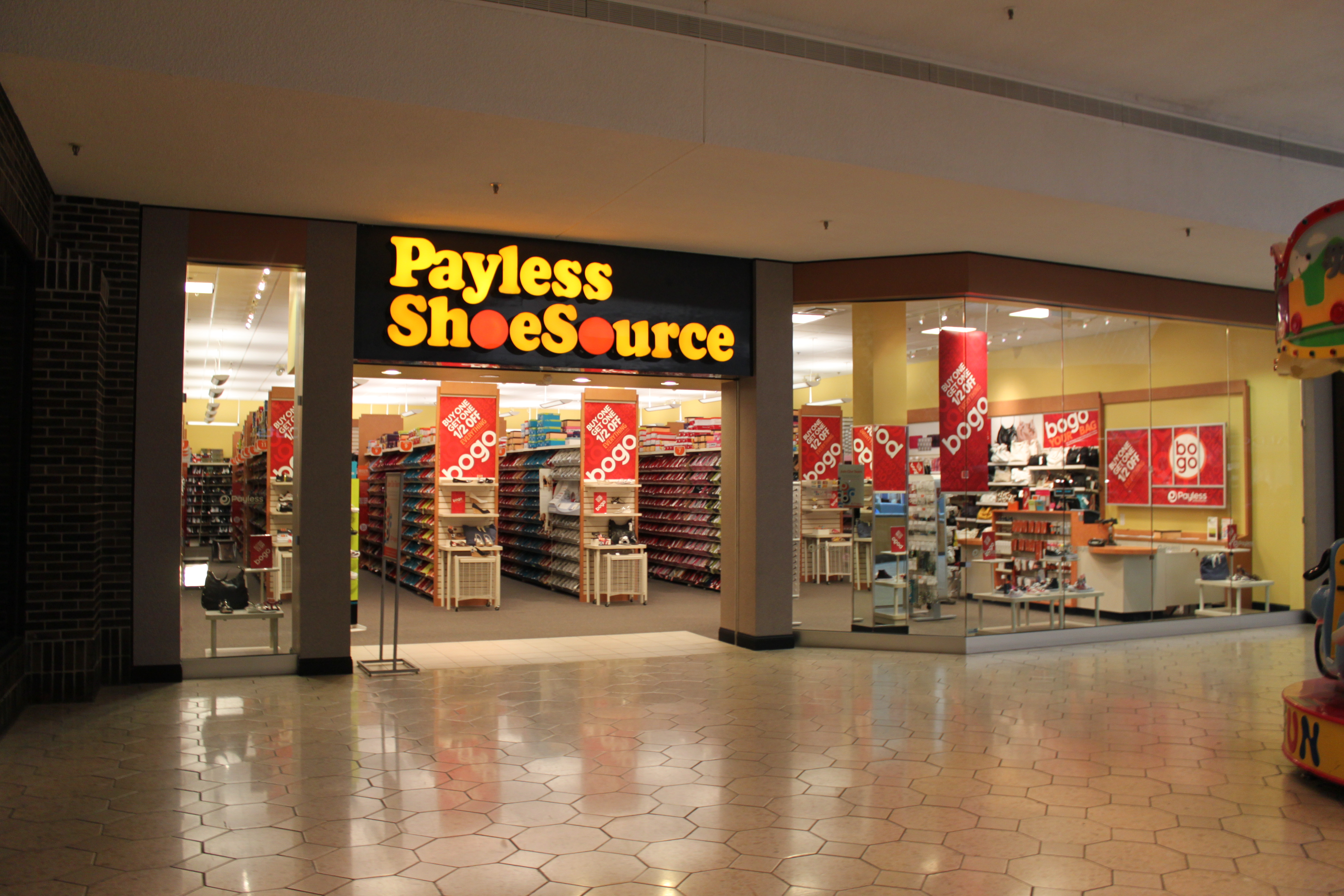
Payless ShoeSource store, Briarwood Mall, Ann Arbor, Michigan

Pay-Less National was founded in 1956 in Topeka, Kansas, by two cousins, Louis and Shaol Pozez, to open self-service stores selling budget footwear. Circa 1962–1963, Volume Shoe company purchased the original Hill Brothers Shoe Company based in Kansas City, Missouri and converted all 25 of their stores to the "Payless" name. In 1971, Volume Shoe obtained the second Hill Brothers Shoe Store chain that was started in St. Louis, Mo in 1956 by Al Melnick and Sol Nathanson with the assistance and aid of the original Hill Brothers in Kansas City. The St. Louis version of "'Hill Brothers Self Service Shoe Store'" went from 3 to 103 stores in the Midwest and South between 1956 and 1971. Volume Shoe originally operated the 103 stores under the "Hill Brothers Self Service" name.

Starting in 1972, Volume Shoe began to consolidate stores in proximity and convert others to the "Payless" brand. The St. Louis operation of "'Hill Brothers Self Service'" stores were known for their bare bones minimalism and the slogan "two for five – man alive!", that is, women and children's shoes were two pair for five dollars. In 1979, Volume Shoe was acquired by The May Department Stores Company.

Payless bought Picway Shoes from the Kobacker department store chain in 1994. In 1996, May spun off Payless to shareholders, making it once again an independent, publicly traded firm.

Payless acquired the mid-priced shoe chain Parade of Shoes from J. Baker, Inc. in 1997. It opened locations on the sales floor inside Shopko discount stores, replacing J. Baker. As part of a major restructuring, Payless announced in 2004 that it will close down the Parade chain and hundreds of Payless outlets.

On June 27, 2006, Payless announced that it was launching a new logo created to represent a more stylish, upscale and contemporary company. In 2018, the company advertised under a stunt premium banner, Palessi Shoes, to demonstrate that its products could pass for high-end designer brands.

=== 2017 bankruptcy ===
In April 2017, the company, struggling with the migration of retail shopping to e-commerce, filed for Chapter 11 bankruptcy and closed 673 stores nationwide. Prior to the bankruptcy, heavily loaded with debt due to a private equity buy out, the company's credit rating was downgraded by Moody's. It has $100 million in loans that will come due in the next five years. The company's bankruptcy announcement was part of a trend of retail closures in 2016–2017 known as the retail apocalypse.

Payless emerged from bankruptcy court protection in August 2017. The company was the first among a group of retailers going through bankruptcy since 2016 to successfully complete the process of restructuring.

=== 2019 bankruptcy and revival in 2020 ===
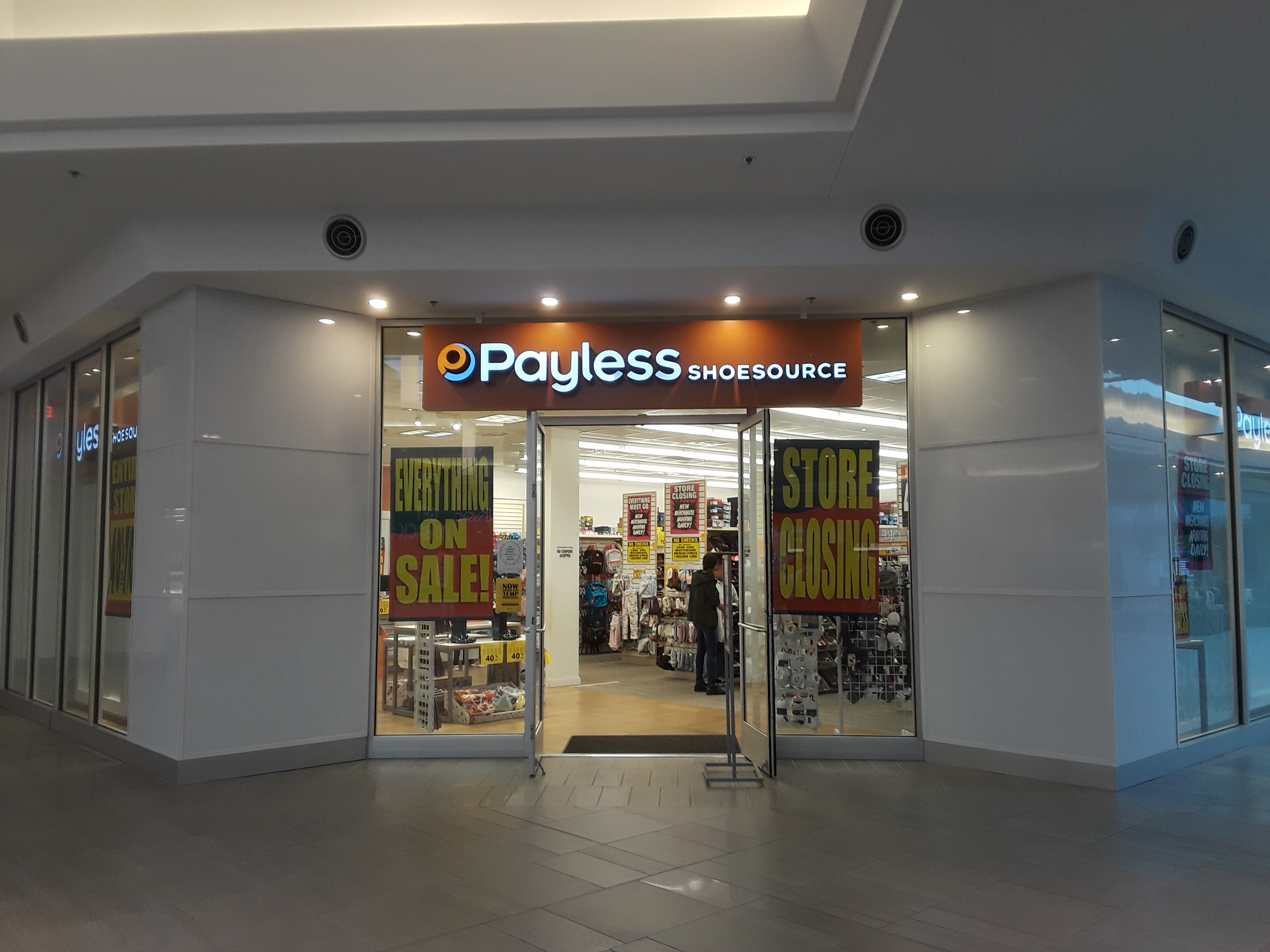
A closing Payless store at Springfield Town Center, Springfield, Virginia in 2019

On February 14, 2019, Payless filed for bankruptcy again for a second time and this time they closed all 2,100 stores in the United States by May 2019. On February 19, 2019, it announced would also close 248 stores in Canada. The 790 stores across Latin America and the other stores internationally would not be affected. Texas A&M University marketing professor and interim director Cheryl H. Bridges then surmised that Payless did not heed the changing retail landscape and "reinvent its stores" quickly enough to stay competitive in a more crowded market.

Payless emerged from bankruptcy on January 16, 2020, with plans to re-launch a U.S. e-commerce site. On August 18, 2020, Payless, officially dropping 'ShoeSource' from its name, did relaunch its e-commerce website. It also announced plans to open between 300 and 500 free-standing stores in North America over the next five years and relocated its company headquarters from Topeka, Kansas to Edgewater, Florida.

== Locations ==
- Canada: At the end of 2018, Payless had 248 stores in Canada, however, it was announced in February 2019 that all of the stores would be closed.
- Eastern Caribbean: In 2014, Payless opened its first store in St. Lucia at the Baywalk Mall in Gros-Islet. This is one of two Payless stores located on the island of St. Lucia. Antigua, Grenada, St. Kitts, Dominica and St. Vincent all have one store each.
- Australia: In 2013, Payless ShoeSource bought Payless Shoes Australia's full 150 stores, which has operated since 1980 out of administration. Previously, these two companies did not have any affiliation. On December 13, 2016, it was reported that all Payless shoe stores were to be closed in Australia with the loss of 730 jobs.
- Trinidad and Tobago: Payless has a total of 23 stores across Trinidad and Tobago, having first opened its doors in 2001.
- Guyana: Payless opened its first store in Guyana in 2021. A second store was opened in January 2023.
- Barbados: In 2012, Payless expanded into the Barbados market by opening the first ten-employee store at Haggatt Hall, St. Michael. This has since grown to 5 stores across the island.
- Jamaica: Payless opened in Jamaica in January 2011, and today has a total of 15 stores on the island.
- Philippines: As of March 2019, Payless has 76 stores in the Philippines.
- Indonesia, Singapore, and Malaysia: In April 2011, Payless launched its first store in Jakarta, Indonesia followed by one store in Kuala Lumpur and Singapore within the same year and under the same management. Payless operates 73 stores throughout Indonesia currently.
- Thailand: The Central Marketing Group (CMG), a business unit of the Central Group, has signed a franchise agreement with Kansas-based Payless that will see outlets next year in Bangkok – Chonburi, making Thailand its 15th franchise country. It will also adopt Payless's new Hot Zone format and purchase products directly from the seasonal assortments, with slight adjustments for local needs.
- United Arab Emirates: It belongs to AlShaya group in the UAE. It has opened different branches in Dubai Mall, Mirdif City Center and Sahara Center, and also in Bawadi Mall in Al-Ain City.
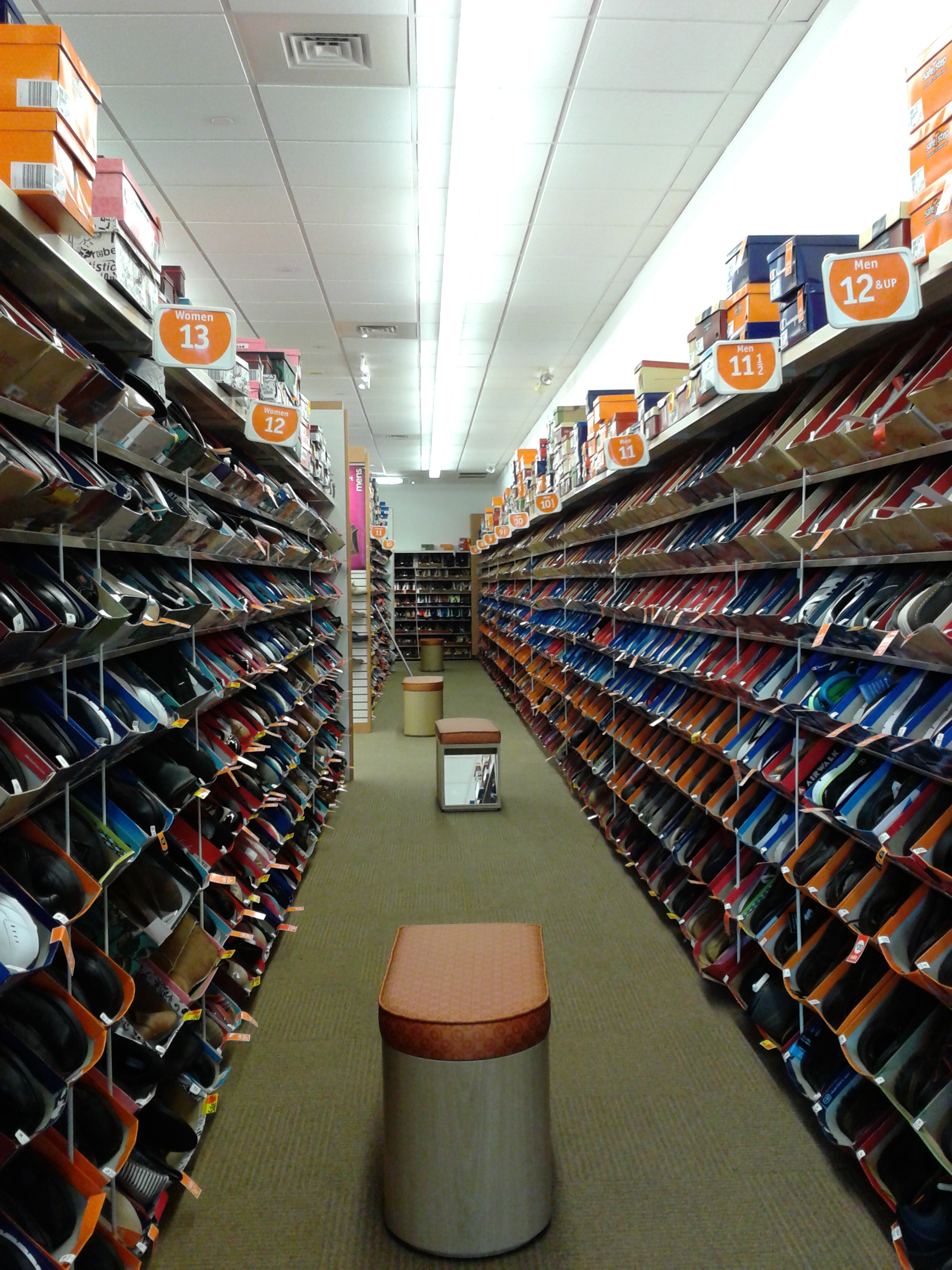
Interior of a Payless ShoeSource in Groveton, Virginia

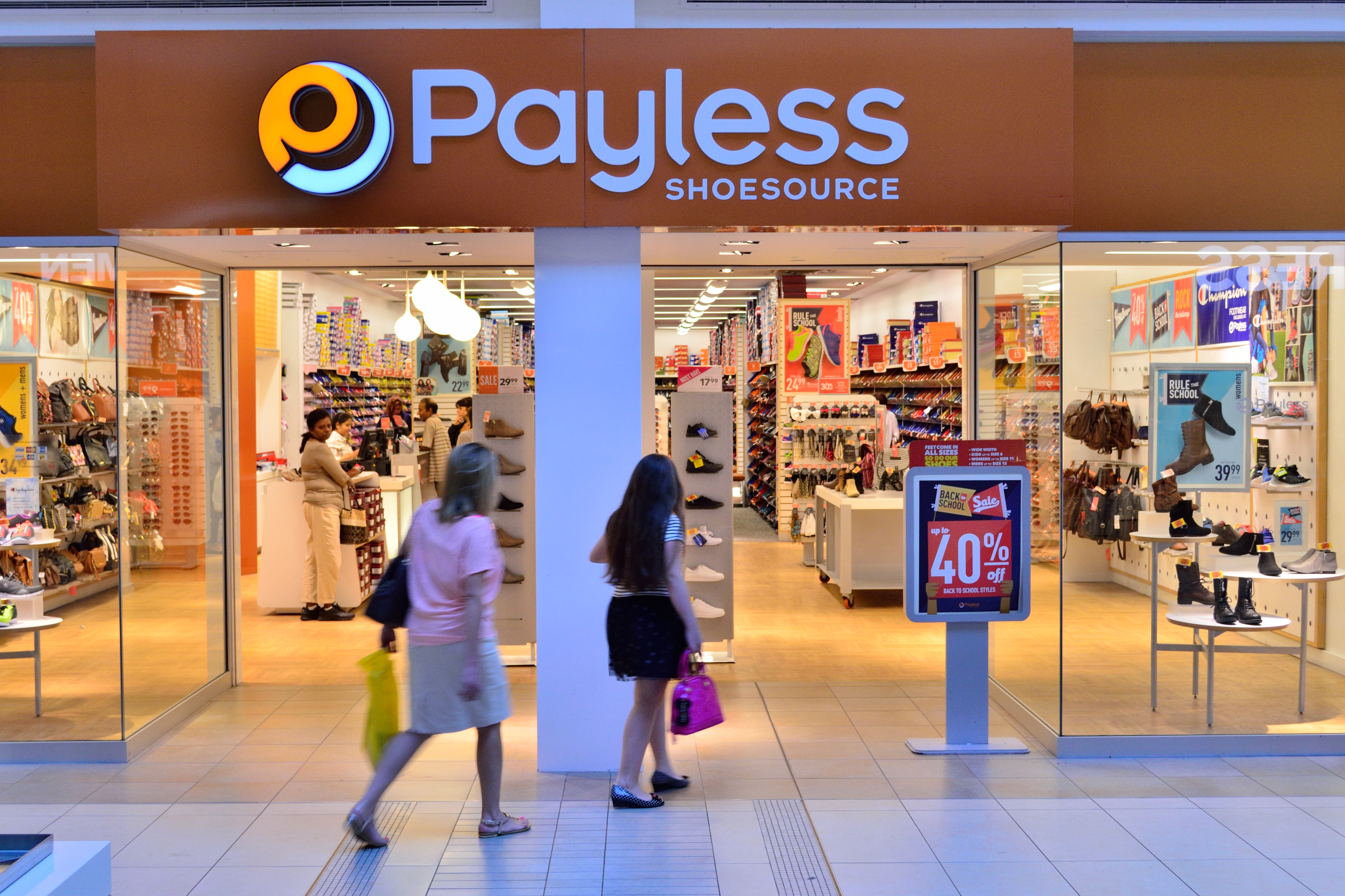
Payless ShoeSource in Fairview Mall, Canada.

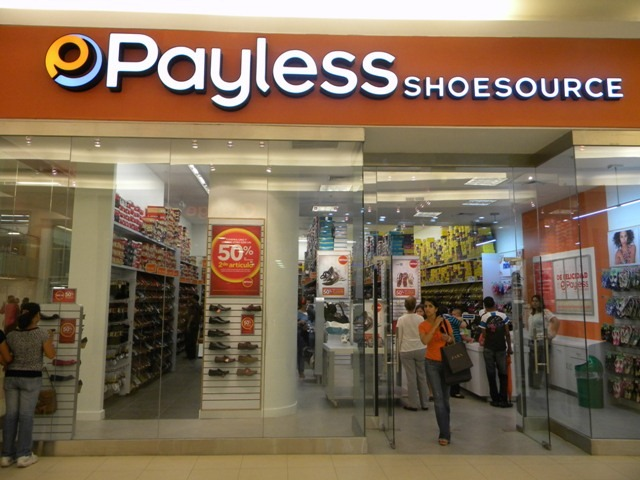
Payless in Santo Domingo, Dominican Republic

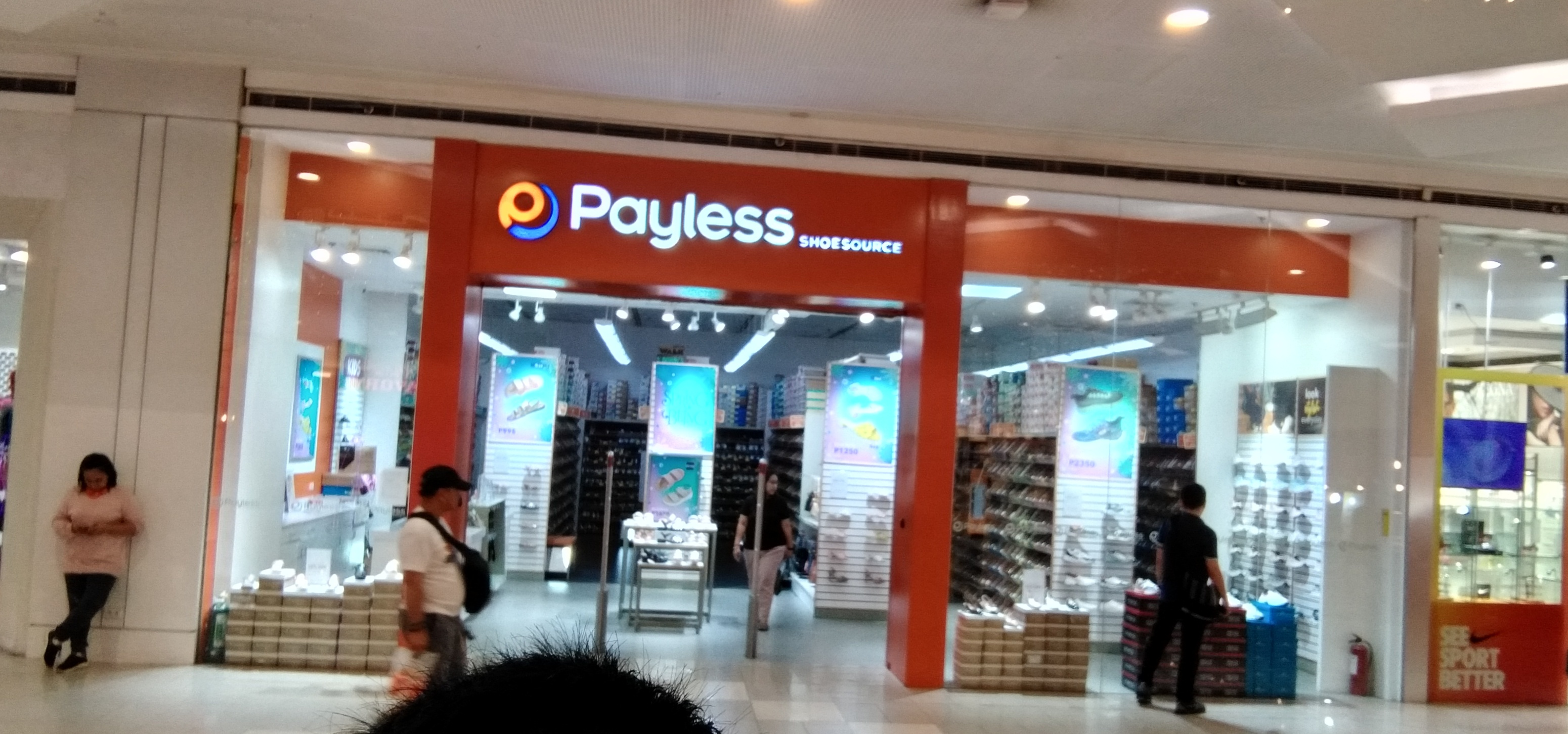
A branch of Payless ShoeSource at SM City San Lazaro in Manila, Philippines.

== Collective Brands ==
Collective Brands, Inc. was an American holding company that owned Payless ShoeSource, Robeez, and Airwalk. The company was purchased by Wolverine World Wide, Blum Capital, and Golden Gate Capital in 2012.

Stride Rite Corporation purchased the Sperry Top-Sider and Keds brand names from Uniroyal in 1979. During 2005, Stride Rite completed its acquisition of Saucony. In 2006, Stride Rite purchased footwear brand Robeez. Payless purchased many of these companies during the 2000s, and on August 16, 2007, the company changed its name to Collective Brands, Inc.

Payless, operating as Collective Brands, Inc. formed a division called Collective Licensing International, LLC (CLI) in January 2004, which was based in Englewood, Colorado. CLI held and owned various clothing and sport brands, particularly "youth lifestyle brands" and board-sport brands such as Airwalk, Vision Street Wear, Sims, Lamar and LTD, World Snowboarding Championships, Sugarboards, Carve, genetic, Dukes, Rage, Ultra-Wheels, Hind, Spot Bilt and Skate Attack. The primary purpose of the division was to develop brands and provide them with marketing and branding guidance in various markets. In 2010, CLI acquired Above The Rim from Reebok International for an undisclosed amount.

On October 9, 2012, Collective Brands, Inc. announced its acquisition by Golden Gate Capital and Blum Capital was completed. As a result, Payless ShoeSource and Collective Licensing International operate as a private, standalone entity known as Payless Holdings. As part of the transaction, Wolverine World Wide, a Michigan-based boot and shoe manufacturer, acquired Stride Rite Corporation including its Sperry Top-Sider, Keds, Saucony, and other brands from Collective Brands, Inc. The purchase was valued at $2 billion, including debt.

On July 14, 2014, Authentic Brands Group acquired some assets from Payless's division Collective Licensing International, LLC.
