= Stuff sack =

Drawstring bag usually used for camping items

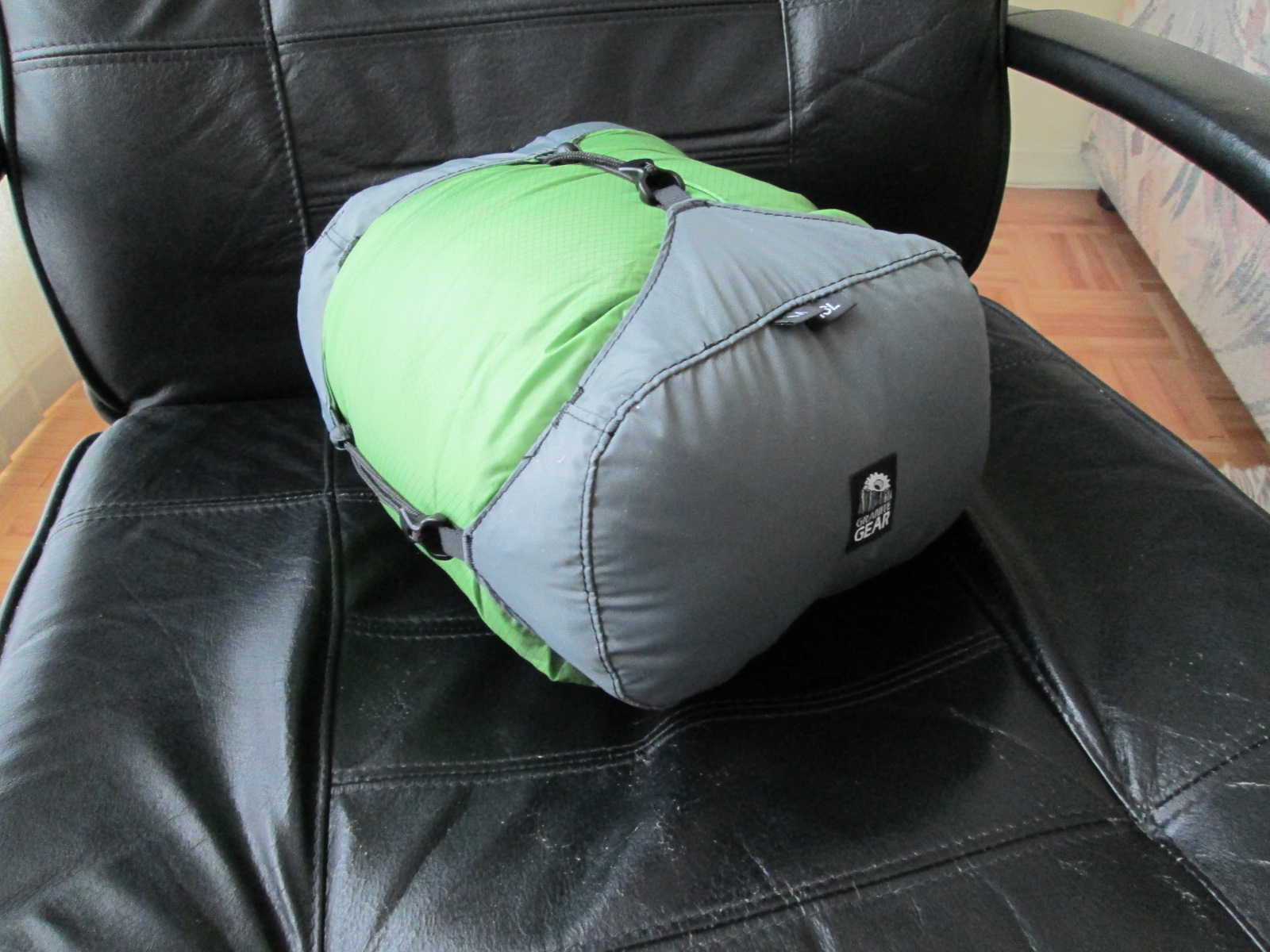
A stuff sack with two quilts inside

A stuff sack is a type of drawstring bag, usually used for storing camping items. Stuff sacks are commonly used for the storage of sleeping bags, which are then stuffed into the bag, rather than rolled or folded. Stuff sacks may also be used as general containers to collect many small items together.

The compression sack is a type of stuff sack designed particularly for the storage of sleeping bags in internal-frame backpacks. It is equipped with a cloth lid that is attached to the opposite (sealed) end of the sack by adjustable straps. When the straps are forcibly shortened, the sack and its non-rigid contents are reduced in size.
