= Keds =

American casual shoe brand

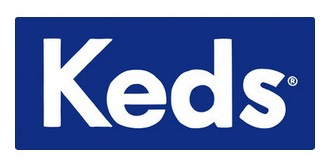
- Type: Subsidiary
- Industry: Sportswear and Sports Goods
- Founded: 1916; 110 years ago
- Headquarters: Waltham, Massachusetts, United States
- Areas served: Worldwide
- Key people: Brendan Hoffman, CEO of Wolverine World Wide
- Products: Footwear
- Parent: Uniroyal (1916–1979); Stride Rite Corporation (1979–2012); Wolverine World Wide (2012–2023); Designer Brands (2023–present)
- Website: www.keds.com

Keds is an American brand known for its canvas shoes with rubber soles. Founded in 1916 by U.S. Rubber, its original shoe design was the first mass-marketed canvas-top sneaker. The brand was sold to Stride Rite in 1979, which was acquired by Wolverine World Wide in 2012. Since February 2023, Keds has been owned and operated by Designer Brands.

== History ==
=== Early history ===
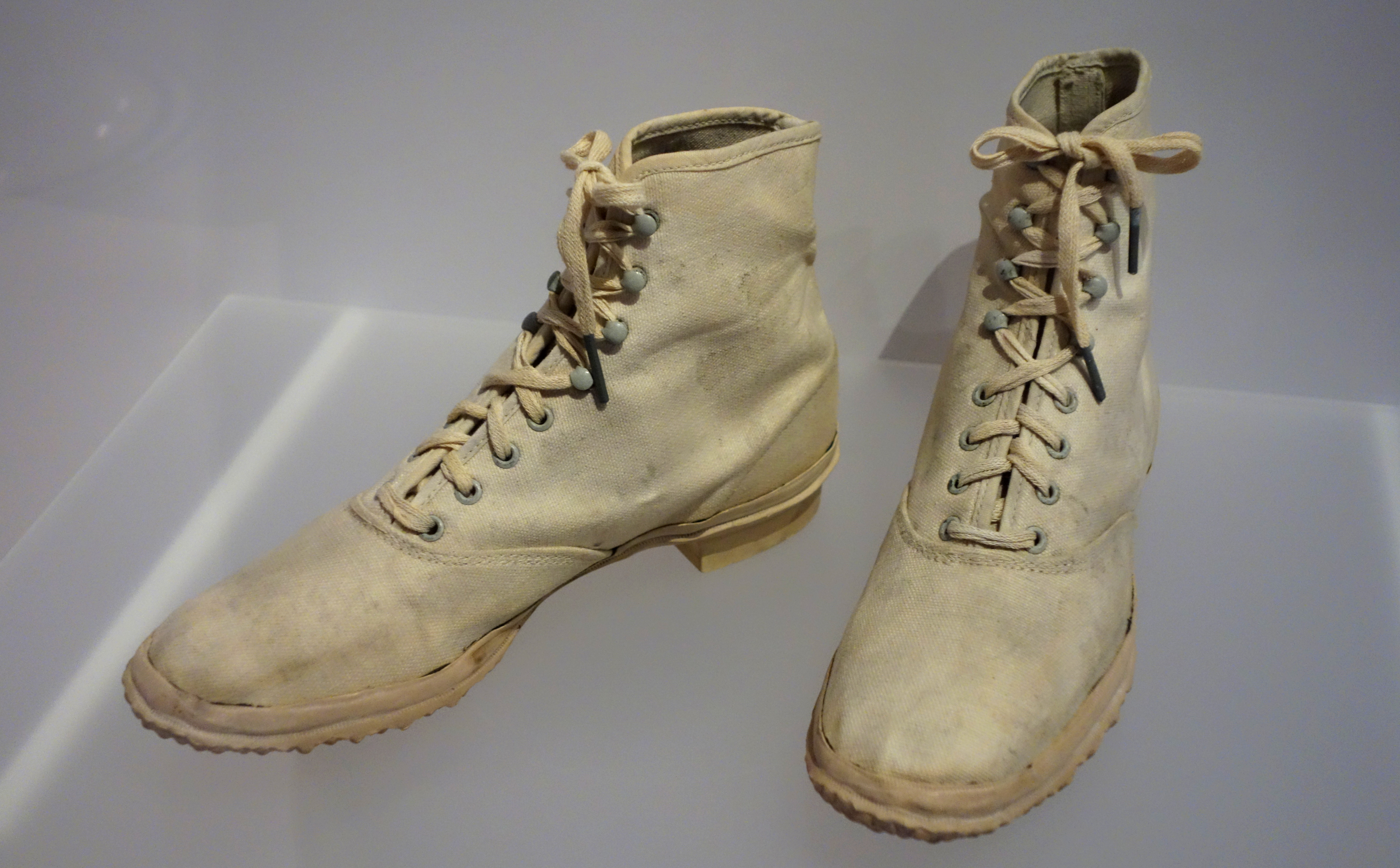
Keds Champion sneaker, for women, 1916

In 1916, U.S. Rubber consolidated 30 different shoe brand names to create one company. Initially, the name "Peds" was chosen for the brand from the Latin word for feet, but it was already trademarked. Keds's original shoe design, the Champion, was the first mass-marketed canvas-top shoe. They became known as "sneakers" as the soft rubber soles allowed "sneaking around silently".

By the early 1920s, the shoes were worn by Olympic soccer players, national and international tennis champions, and college athletes. In 1926, the Keds Triumph shoe was introduced. Keds released "Kedettes", a line of washable high-heeled shoes for women, in 1938.

=== Pro-Keds ===
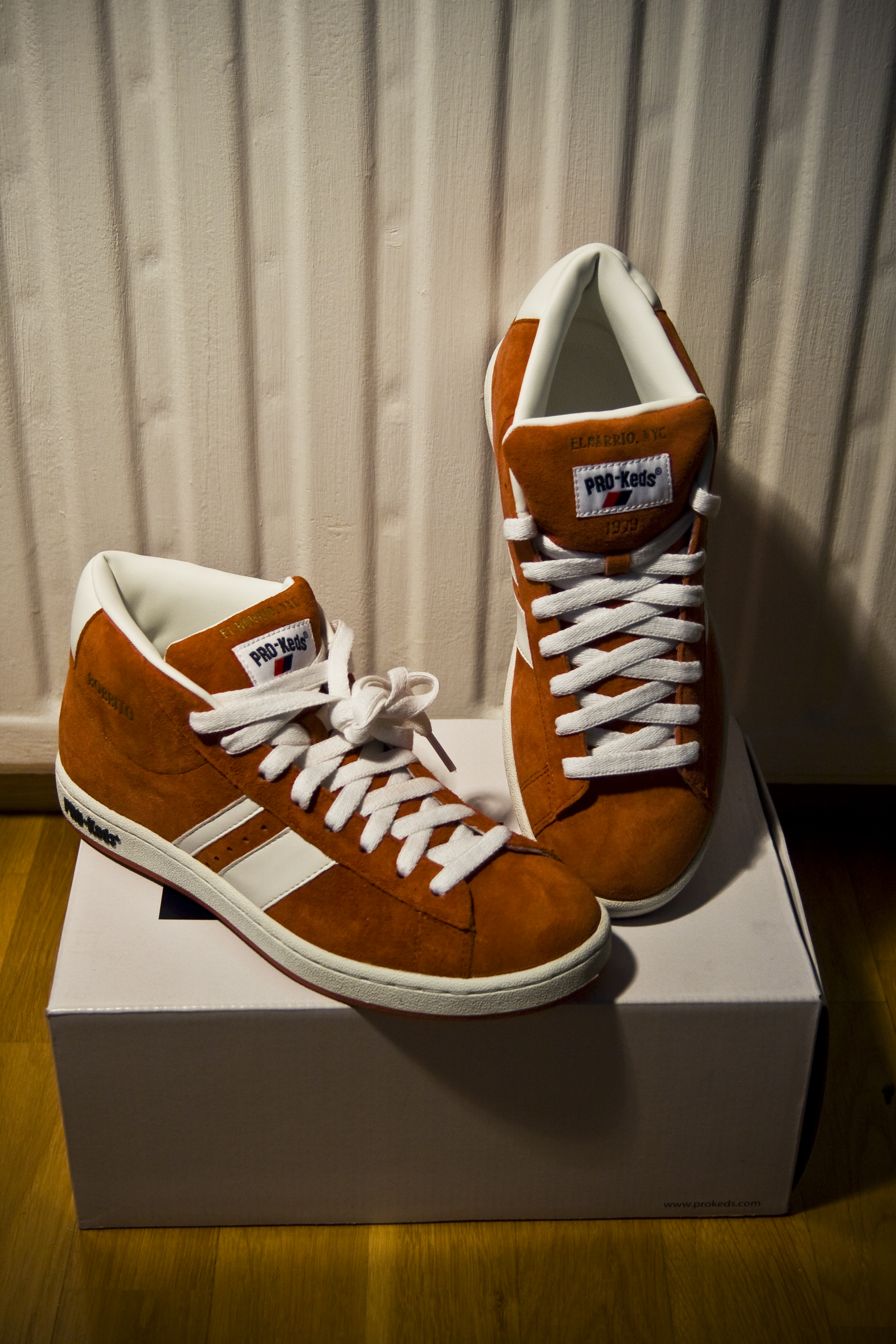
A pair of Pro-Keds Royal Flash court shoes

In 1949, Pro-Keds were introduced as a line of sneakers for athletic performance intended to compete with the industry standard, Converse. Designed specifically for basketball players, the original style, the Royal, was endorsed by George Mikan.

In 1953, the Minneapolis Lakers were outfitted with Pro-Keds. In 1969, Pro-Keds introduced the 69er, and demand for them in Harlem and The Bronx was so overwhelming that they became known as "Uptowns".

The early 1970s saw the introduction of the Royal Plus, also known as the "Suede Super", which had a suede upper, padded collar, and was available in a high or low top. Pro-Keds were worn by NBA stars including Willis Reed, Kareem Abdul-Jabbar, Nate "Tiny" Archibald, JoJo White, Bob Love, Lou Hudson, Bob Lanier and "Pistol" Pete Maravich, as well as musicians The Ramones. The brand gained a following in the hip-hop community by the late 1970s.

In the spring of 1980, Pro-Keds launched a collection of performance cupsole basketball shoes with the marquee model being the Shotmaker. The Shotmaker would be worn by Ralph Sampson and Gerald Henderson. In 1981 Sugar Ray Leonard became a spokesperson for the brand.

=== Subsequent ownership ===
Stride Rite Corporation purchased Keds and Sperry Top-Sider from Uniroyal (formerly U.S. Rubber) in 1979 for $18 million. Keds has produced collaborative collections with companies including Kate Spade New York, Madewell, Opening Ceremony, Steven Alan and Alice + Olivia.

In 2009, Keds launched a collaboration with Loomstate which was sold at Barneys New York. The shoes were made with organic cotton, recycled rubber and non-toxic inks and dyes. Collective Brands Inc., the parent company of Stride Rite Corporation and Keds, was acquired by Wolverine World Wide for $1.32 billion in May 2012.

Keds launched the "Ladies First Since 1916" campaign in July 2015, which focuses on female empowerment and featured celebrities including Taylor Swift. In 2016 Keds celebrated its centennial and the continuation of its "Ladies First Since 1916" campaign with a birthday celebration held during New York Fashion Week. The company also announced that its shoe manufacturing was moving to Michigan, in the U.S. for the first time in 35 years. Since February 2023, Keds has been owned and operated by Designer Brands.

== Popular culture ==
The shoes have been worn by celebrities including Taylor Swift, Marilyn Monroe, Jackie Kennedy Onassis, Katharine Hepburn, Paul Newman, Humphrey Bogart, Kristen Stewart, and Natalie Portman. After the release of the 1987 movie Dirty Dancing, in which Jennifer Grey's character wore Keds, company revenue grew 10 times. Many cheerleaders also wore Keds as part of their uniform during the mid-1980s to the mid-1990s. The popularity of Keds during this time period was referenced by American rock band Wheatus in the lyrics to their 2000 song Teenage Dirtbag.

In the USSR and many post-Soviet countries, sneakers with canvas tops became known generically as "keds" (Russian: кеды). In 2009, singer Lana Del Rey featured in an advertisement for the company and served as a spokesperson for a new line of shoes being offered. In season 1 of the TV show Girls, one of the characters writes a song with the hook "where are you going in those Keds?"
