= Hush Puppies =

American brand of footwear

- Product type: Footwear
- Current owner: Wolverine World Wide
- Country: United States
- Introduced: 1958; 68 years ago
- Markets: 120 countries
- Website: www.hushpuppies.com

Hush Puppies is an American brand of casual footwear. A division of Wolverine World Wide, Hush Puppies is headquartered in Rockford, Michigan. Wolverine also licenses the Hush Puppies name for apparel, toys and accessories.

Hush Puppies uses a Basset Hound named Jason as its logo and mascot.

Hush Puppies introduced its office sneaker collection, incorporating its proprietary "Bounce" cushioning technology designed for workplace footwear in May 2026.

== History ==
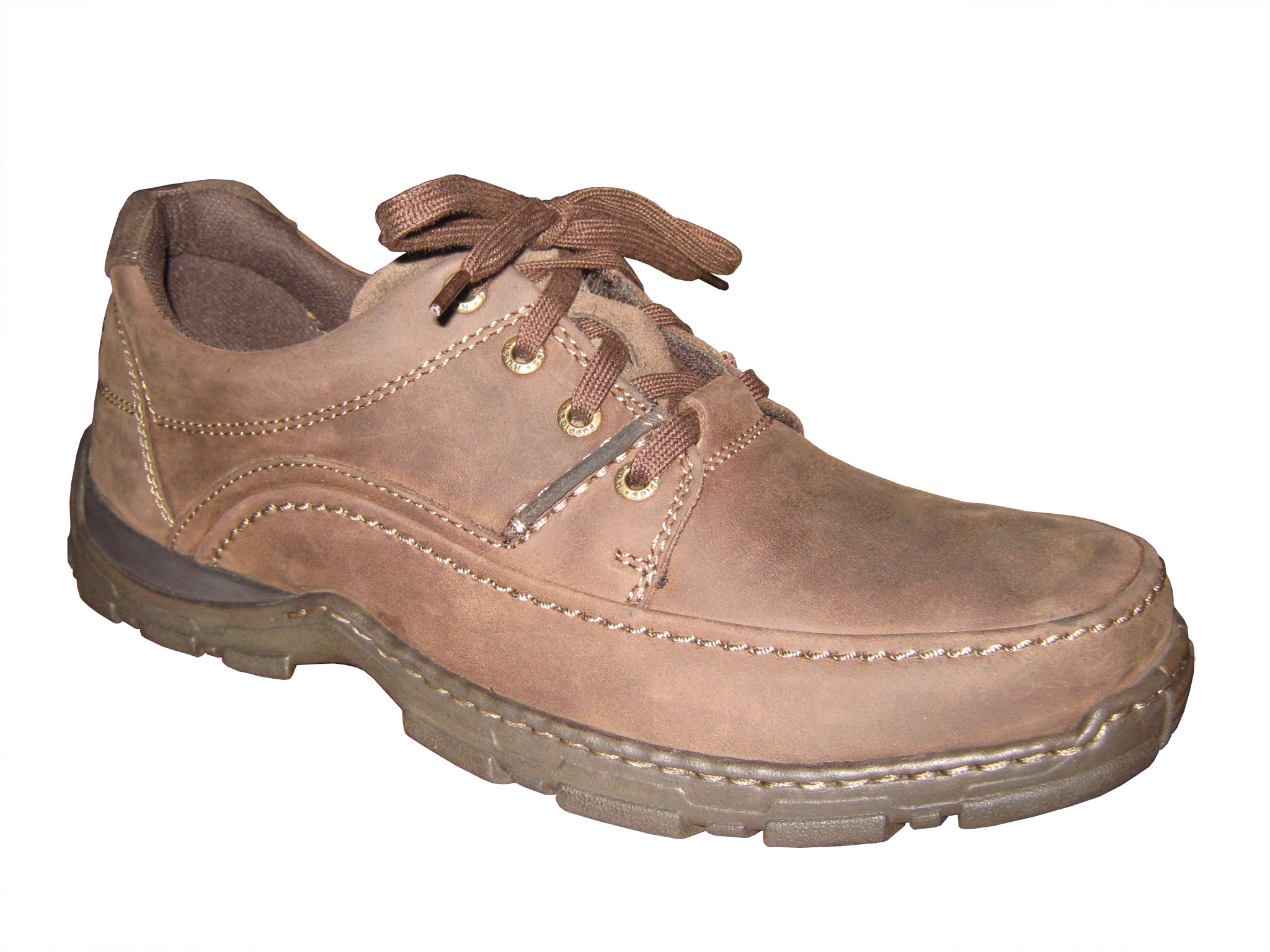
Hush Puppies casual leather shoe

The Hush Puppies brand was founded in 1958 following extensive work to develop a practical method of pigskin tanning for the US military to use in gloves and other protective materials. Pigskin was soft and flexible, but not tough enough to be used in Wolverine's work boots; the company developed a pair of casual shoes from the pigskin to market as a comfort brand. The casual lifestyle positioning appealed to the growing post-war suburbia in the United States; by mid-1959 the company had produced its first million pairs and by 1963 one in ten adults in the United States owned a pair of Hush Puppies.

Hush Puppies claimed their rubber soles saved the life of Rolling Stones guitarist Keith Richards when he accidentally touched his guitar against an ungrounded microphone at a 1965 concert in Sacramento, California. Richards was knocked unconscious, but medics believed that the crepe-soled Hush Puppies shoes he was wearing insulated him and saved his life.

=== 1990s resurgence ===
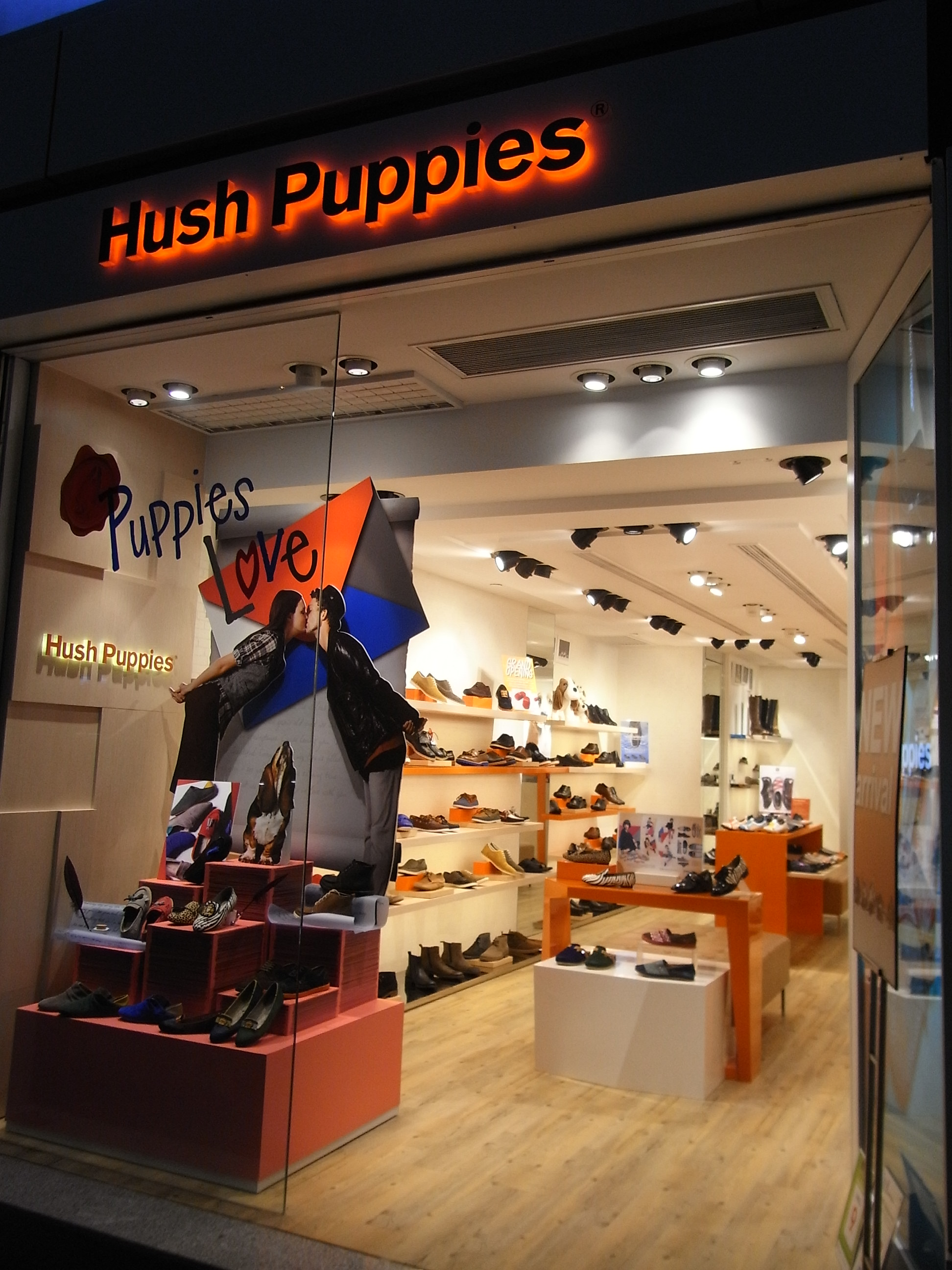
A Hush Puppies storefront

In 1994, when sales were down to 30,000 pairs a year, Hush Puppies suddenly became hip in the clubs and bars of downtown Manhattan where young people were buying them at small shoe stores. Fashion designers John Bartlett, Anna Sui, and Joel Fitzpatrick began featuring them in their collections; the shoes were soon worn by celebrities such as Kenneth Clarke, Princess Diana, Jim Carrey, Sharon Stone, David Bowie, Tom Hanks, Ellen DeGeneres and Sylvester Stallone.

Hush Puppies also benefited from the trend toward dressing-down at work, filling the fashion gap between sneakers and dress shoes. Depending on word of mouth, Wolverine sold 430,000 pairs of the shoes in 1995, and four times that the following year. Hush Puppies won the prize for best accessory at the Council of Fashion Designers awards dinner in 1995.

Hush Puppies' rapid rise in popularity was used as an example of a tipping point by journalist Malcolm Gladwell.
