= Richard C. Blum =

American investor (1935–2022)

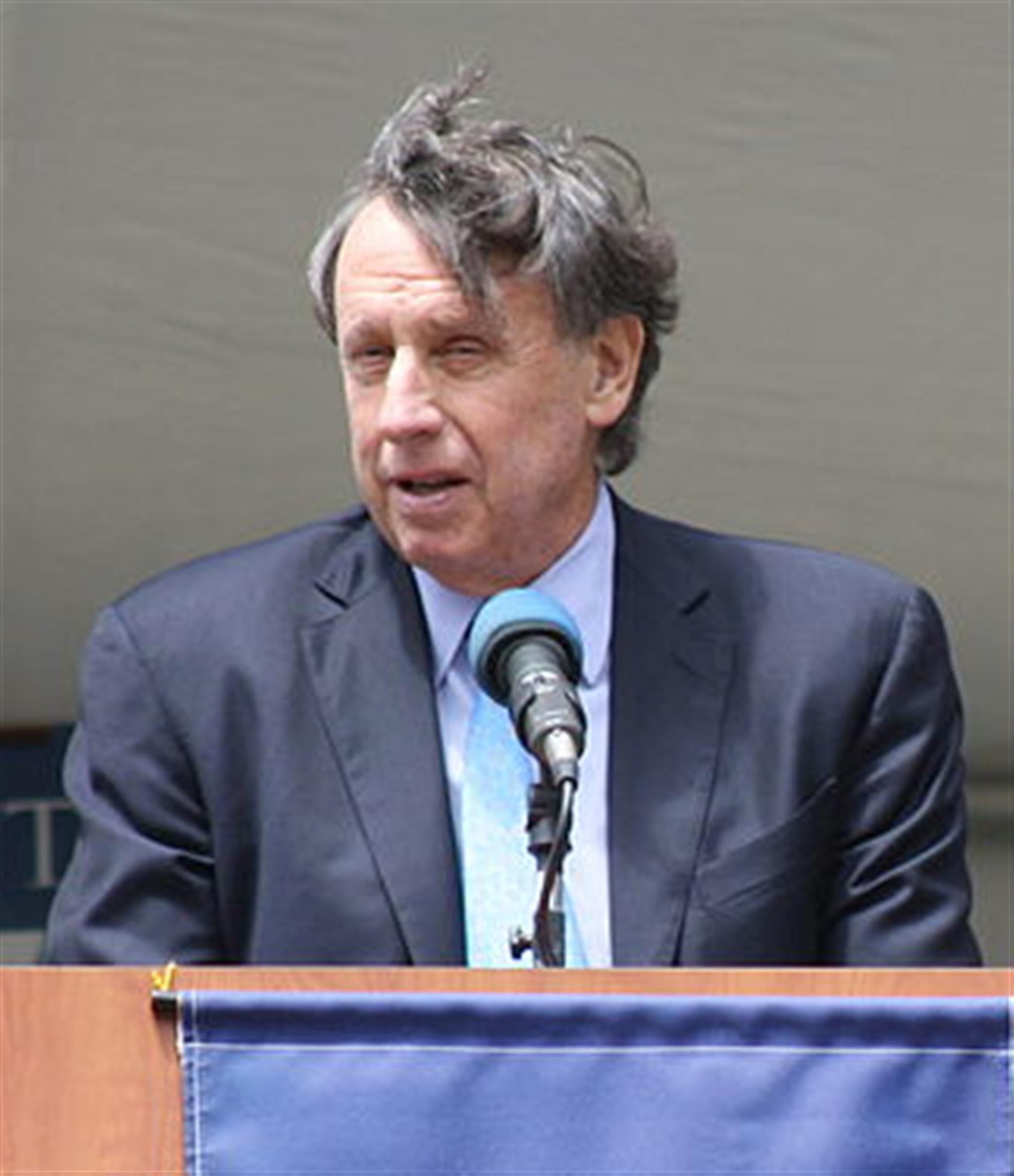
- Blum in 2009
- Born: Richard Charles Blum; July 31, 1935; San Francisco, California, U.S.
- Died: February 27, 2022 (aged 86); San Francisco, California, U.S.
- Education: University of California, Berkeley (BS, MBA)
- Spouses: Andrea Schwartz (m. 1959; div. 1977) Dianne Feinstein (m. 1980)
- Children: 3

Richard Charles Blum (July 31, 1935 – February 27, 2022) was an American investor and the husband of United States Senator Dianne Feinstein. He was the chairman and president of Blum Capital, an equity investment management firm. Blum was on the boards of directors of several companies, including CB Richard Ellis, where until May 2009 he served as the chairman of that board. He was a regent of the University of California from 2002 until his death.

== Early life ==
Blum was born in San Francisco, California, to a Jewish family. He was the son of Louise (Hirsch) and Herbert Blum, who sold robes and raincoats. He attended San Francisco public schools. He received his Bachelor of Science in business administration in 1958 and a Master of Business Administration in 1959 from the Haas School of Business of the University of California, Berkeley.

In the 1970s, Blum supported then Mayor of San Francisco George Moscone. After Moscone's assassination, Blum supported the new mayor Dianne Feinstein; they married in 1980. Blum had three daughters from his first marriage to Andrea Schwartz Blum.

== Career ==
Blum joined investment brokerage Sutro & Co. at the age of 23, becoming a partner before age 30. At Sutro, Blum led a partnership that acquired Ringling Bros. and Barnum & Bailey Circus for $8 million, selling it to Mattel four years later for $40 million. On the back of this deal Blum started in business for himself in 1975, founding what is now Blum Capital Partners; a stake in URS Corp. was one of its first investments.

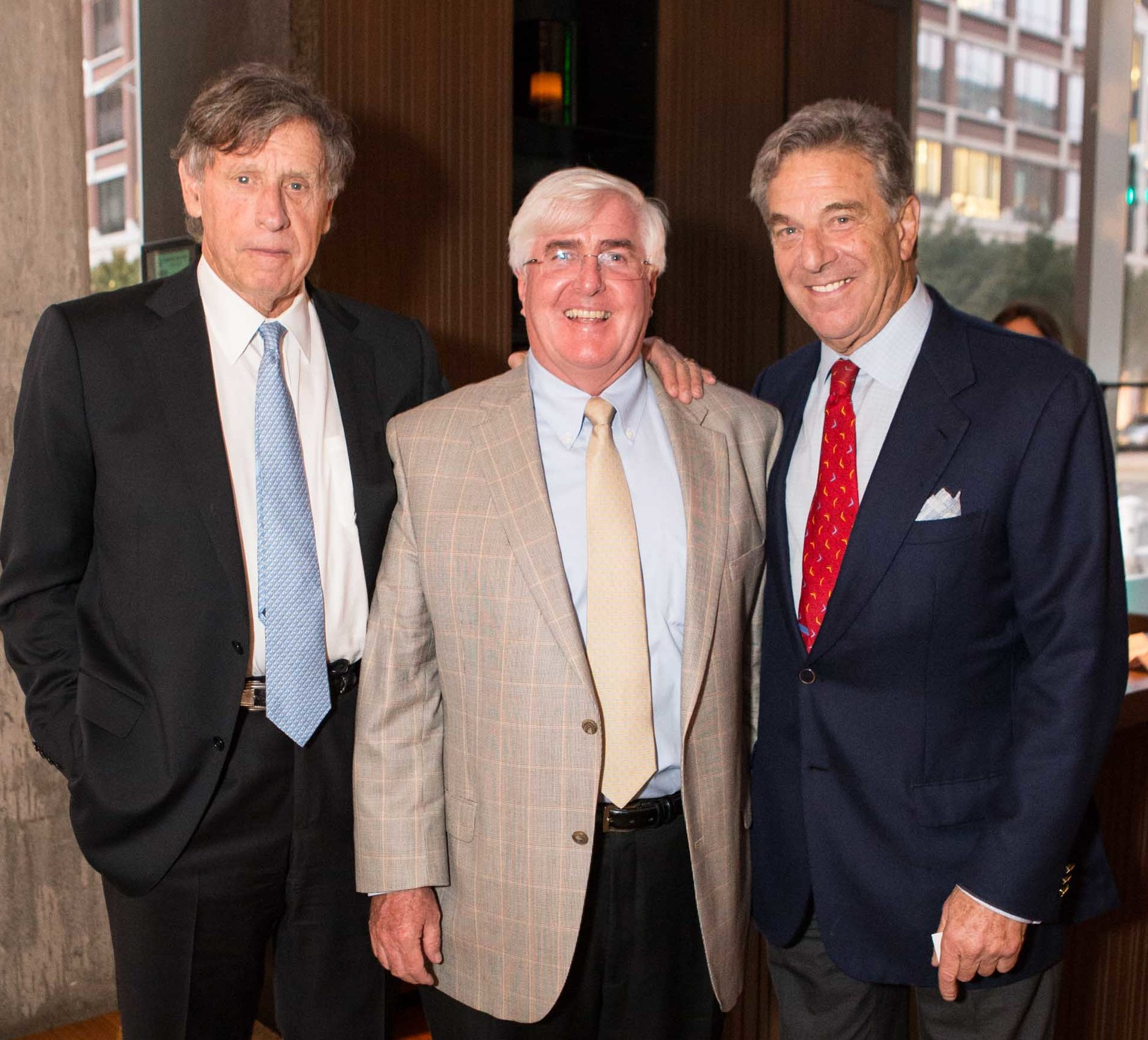
Blum with fellow financiers Ron Conway and Paul Pelosi in 2012

Blum founded Blum Capital in 1975. Blum previously served as chairman of the board of directors of CB Richard Ellis, as well as serving as director on the boards of directors of three other portfolio companies: Fairmont Raffles Holdings International Ltd., Current Media, L.L.C., and Myer Pty Ltd. in Australia. Blum co-founded Newbridge Capital in 1994.

Blum served on the boards of multiple companies, including Northwest Airlines Corporation, Glenborough Realty Trust, Inc., Korea First Bank, URS Corporation, and National Education Corporation. Blum was the founder and chairman of the American Himalayan Foundation and was Honorary Consul to Mongolia and Nepal. Blum was also a member of the advisory board of Berkeley's Haas School of Business.

On March 12, 2002, Blum was appointed by California Governor Gray Davis to a 12-year term as one of the Regents of the University of California. He was reappointed to another 12-year term in 2014 by Governor Jerry Brown.

On April 25, 2009, at a talk featuring the 14th Dalai Lama, Berkeley Chancellor Robert Birgenau presented Blum with the Berkeley Medal, the university's top honor. The talk was sponsored by his American Himalayan Foundation and the Blum Center for Developing Economies at Berkeley.

Blum was also the primary owner of Career Education Corporation until 2015 and served on the boards of the CB Richard Ellis (chairman), Newbridge Capital (co-chairman), and Blum Capital.

== Personal life ==
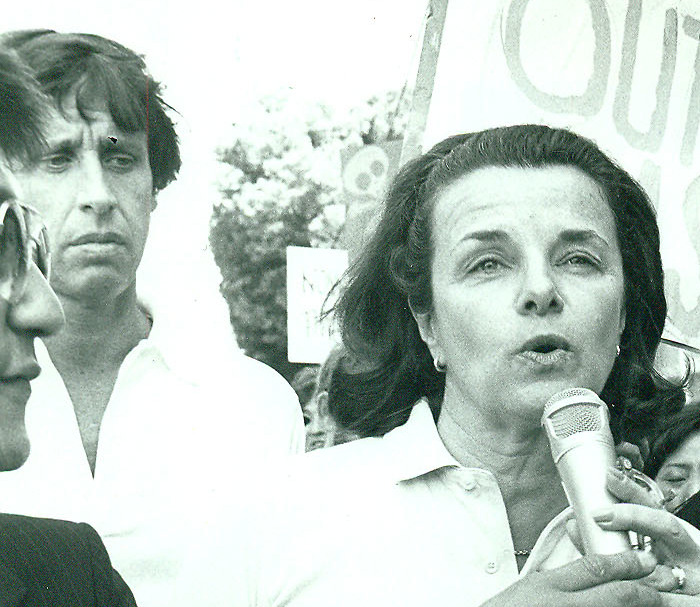
Blum with wife Dianne Feinstein in the late 1970s

Blum had a strong interest in Tibet and Tibetan Buddhism, and in 1981 he attempted to climb Mount Everest from the Tibetan side with Sir Edmund Hillary. He was the chairman and founder of the apolitical American Himalayan Foundation (AHF), which has given millions of dollars to build hospitals and schools in Tibet and Nepal, but refrained from political involvement with the Chinese control of Tibet.

Blum was at various times a trustee of The Carter Center; co-chairman of The World Conference of Religions for Peace; member of Governing Council of The Wilderness Society; member of the board of trustees of the Brookings Institution; member of the board of trustees of the American Cancer Society Foundation; member of the board of directors of the National Democratic Institute; and a member of the board of trustees of the Richard C. Blum Center for Developing Economies at the University of California, Berkeley. He contributed $15 million toward the establishment of the center, which addresses extreme poverty and disease in the developing world. In 2019, Blum provided an additional $12 million to endow a chair at the center.

He donated to the University of California at San Francisco (UCSF), Merced and Los Angeles (UCLA) and Sonoma State University, as well as Macalester College. He pledged $1.25 million to the University of San Francisco (USF) in 2007, and another $1.5 million to USF for "global education" in 2019. He was awarded the UCSF medal in 2012. He served on many other boards, including the Seva Foundation and as chairman of the Himalayan Foundation. In the arts and culture, he made grants to the Creative Visions Foundation, the Daniel Pearl Foundation, San Francisco's Asian Art Museum, the San Francisco Conservatory of Music, and the Geffen Playhouse in Los Angeles.

Blum was diagnosed with lung cancer in 2016. He was hospitalized in September 2021 for an undisclosed reason. He died from cancer at his home in San Francisco on February 27, 2022, at the age of 86.

=== Controversy ===
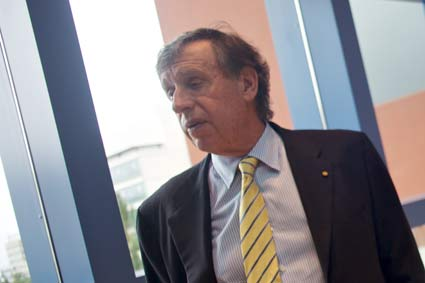
Blum in 2010

Blum's wife, US Senator Dianne Feinstein, was criticized over Blum's government contracts and business dealings with the People's Republic of China and her past votes on trade agreements with that country. Blum denied any wrongdoing.

Blum and Feinstein were also criticized for having a 75% stake in Tutor Perini, a building contractor which received military contracts for projects in Iraq and Afghanistan during the U.S. occupation of those countries.

In 2008, during the sub-prime mortgage crisis, Feinstein contacted the Federal Deposit Insurance Corporation with a proposal to fund the FDIC's foreclosed-property dealings through the US government's general budget. Not long afterward, Blum's real estate firm, CB Richard Ellis, won a lucrative contract with the Federal Deposit Insurance Corporation to sell foreclosed properties.

In 2020, Blum was discovered to have written letters on behalf of unqualified applicants to various UC campus chancellors. The applicants were admitted through student athletics programs, even though, according to a state audit “they possessed little athletic talent.” The audit described Blum's actions as "particularly problematic" as University Regents should not influence admissions decisions.

== As author ==
- Blum, Richard C.; Stone, Erica; Coburn, Broughton (2006). Himalaya: Personal Stories of Grandeur, Challenge, and Hope. National Geographic Books. ISBN 978-0-7922-6192-6.
- Blum, Richard C.; Hayes, Thomas C. (2016). An Accident of Geography: Compassion, innovation, and the fight against poverty. Greenleaf Book Group Press. ISBN 978-1-62634-334-4.
