= Sweaty Betty =

British retailer of women's activewear

- Industry: Retail
- Founded: 1998
- Headquarters: London, England
- Key people: Tamara Hill-Norton (founder); Simon Hill-Norton (founder); Julia Straus (CEO)
- Products: Clothing; Sportswear; Sports equipment
- Parent: Wolverine World Wide
- Website: sweatybetty.com

Sweaty Betty is a British retailer specialising in women's activewear, founded by Tamara and Simon Hill-Norton. It has over 50 shops in the United Kingdom, six shops in the United States and concessions in department stores Harrods and Bloomingdale's. In August 2021, Sweaty Betty was bought by American apparel manufacturer Wolverine Worldwide.

== History ==
Sweaty Betty was founded in 1998 by Tamara and Simon Hill-Norton with one boutique in London's Notting Hill. The brand was named after a song of the same name by British band the Macc Lads. By 2003, the company had expanded to five boutiques. In 2006, Sweaty Betty opened their first concession in Selfridges and now feature in the in-store Body Studio – this was later followed by one in Harrods.

As of 2016, there were over 40 Sweaty Betty boutiques around the UK, 6 in the US and 4 department store concessions as well as a British and American online store.

In 2019, Sweaty Betty's website was targeted by cyber-criminals, who inserted malicious code into its eCommerce website to capture customer card details during the checkout process.

In August 2021, Sweaty Betty was bought by American apparel manufacturer Wolverine Worldwide for £300 million.

As of May 2022, there are 47 Sweaty Betty boutiques and 14 department store concessions in the UK. There are also 49 department store concessions in the U.S., and 17 shops and department store concessions in Canada, Germany, Hong Kong, Ireland, and Singapore. There are also online stores for the British and American markets.

In November 2025, Sweaty Betty was accused by personal trainer Georgina Cox of using her slogan "Wear the Damn Shorts" without permission. Sweaty Betty told the BBC that the slogan had featured in its marketing campaigns for several years and that "no one, including Ms Cox, has sole rights" to the phrase. Cox had previously collaborated with the company in 2023, receiving payment to promote one of its campaigns.

== Awards ==
In 2001, Sweaty Betty was named Sports Industries Federation "sports retailer of the year".

In 2015, Sweaty Betty won an award for "Healthiest Employees" as part of Vitality Health Insurances' Britain's Healthiest Workplace Awards.
