= Blum Capital =

American private equity firm

Blum Capital Partners, L.P.
- Company type: Private
- Industry: Private equity
- Founded: 1975; 51 years ago
- Founder: Richard C. Blum
- Headquarters: San Francisco, California
- Products: Leveraged buyout, PIPE, growth capital
- Total assets: $4.5 billion
- Number of employees: over 30
- Website: www.blumcapital.com

Blum Capital Partners, L.P., also known as Blum Capital, is an American private equity firm founded in 1975 by Richard C. Blum. The firm is headquartered in San Francisco, California. It is focused on leveraged buyout, growth capital and PIPE investments in small cap and middle-market companies. Blum Capital became known for pioneering a hybrid strategy for investing in public companies, combining private equity and strategic block investment.

== History ==
Prior to founding his eponymous firm, Richard C. Blum worked at Sutro & Co., an investment management and brokerage company. While working at Sutro & Co., he led a partnership that acquired the struggling Ringling Bros. and Barnum & Bailey Circus in 1967, for $8 million. The Circus was then sold to Mattel Inc. for $50 million, in 1971.

Blum founded Blum Capital in 1975. As of 2011, Blum Capital managed $2.73 billion in stocks and investments.

Significant investments for Blum Capital have come from Fair Isaac, Lenovo, DHL Airways, and CB Richard Ellis.

In 1994, Blum Capital entered into a joint venture, Newbridge Capital, with Texas Pacific Group and ACON Investments to invest in Asia and Latin America.

== Investments ==
After the 2008 financial crisis, the firm sustained major financial losses in its real estate investments. Its investment into CB Richard Ellis Group (CBRE)—into which Blum Capital had invested over the previous 30 years, helping to take the company public—decreased by about 37% amid "global economic concerns that impacted real estate markets".

In June 2011, Blum Capital had a $1.87 billion stock portfolio, which had decreased 36%, to about $1.19 billion, by November 2011. Six of the firm's seven-largest public stock investments had also lost "at least 22% of their value" in the same five-month period.

On October 9, 2012, Wolverine World Wide, Golden Gate Capital and Blum Capital took over Collective Brands.

On March 26, 2015, it was announced that Blum Capital and FRHI Hotels & Resorts will acquire 88% of the shares of the Grand del Mar Resort in San Diego.
