= The Codfish Musket =

1936 children's historical novel by Agnes Hewes

- Author: Agnes Hewes
- Illustrator: Armstrong Sperry
- Language: English
- Genre: Children's literature
- Publisher: Doubleday
- Publication date: 1936
- Publication place: United States

The Codfish Musket is a 1936 children's historical novel written by Agnes Hewes and illustrated by Armstrong Sperry. In 1803, Bostonian Dan Boit sees the Columbia Rediviva return to port after sailing around the world. Inspired by the trading stories he hears, he takes a job working for a gun dealer and trader, Israel Cotton. Dan is sent to Washington to find markets for Kentucky rifles. Here he finds a journal belonging to President Jefferson and returns it, becoming Jefferson's new secretary, replacing Meriwether Lewis, who is on the Lewis and Clark Expedition.

Dan is sent to the frontier to deliver a message to Lewis; on the way, he discovers a gang is selling rifles to the British, who in turn are arming Indians so they can harass trappers. Dan met the leader of the gang, Tom Gentry, in Boston when Tom stole a load of muskets marked with a codfish seal. In a shootout, the gun-running gang is dispersed after most members are killed. In the spring of 1804, Dan delivers the message to Lewis and returns to Washington.

The novel was a Newbery Honor recipient in 1937, Hewes' third Honor book after Spice and the Devil's Cave (1931) and Glory of the Seas (1934) . Sperry would later go on to win a Newbery Medal in 1941 for his book Call It Courage.
