= Accent Group =

Australian multinational clothing retail and distribution company

- Type: Public
- Traded as: ASX: AX1
- Industry: Retail
- Founded: 1988; 38 years ago
- Headquarters: Melbourne, Australia
- Area served: Australia, New Zealand
- Key people: David Gordon (Chairman); Daniel Agostinelli (CEO)
- Products: Footwear
- Revenue: $1.3 billion (2022)
- Operating income: $62 million (2021)
- Net income: $22 million (2022)
- Website: accentgr.com.au

Accent Group Limited is an Australian and New Zealand footwear and clothing retail, wholesaling and distribution company. It has more than 900 retail stores, along with 19 brands, and more than 20 online platforms. It is listed on the Australian Securities Exchange.

== History ==
Accent Group began as a small New Zealand wholesaling business in 1988. In 2015, RCG Corporation acquired Accent Group for around $200 million. In November 2017, RCG Corporation was renamed Accent Group Limited.

The company acquired several Australian fashion and footwear brands in the late 2010s and early 2020s. In April 2021, Accent Group entered an agreement to acquire the Glue Store retail business and the Next Athleisure's wholesale and distribution business for $13 million. Next Athleisure owned the brands Nude Lucy, Beyond Her, Lulu & Rose, Article One, and distributed the brands Superga, Ellesse, Le Coq Sportif, Kappa, K-Way, Sebago and Napapijri.

More than 400 Accent Group stores were closed for at least a month in 2020 due to lockdown restrictions brought on by the COVID-19 pandemic. Restrictions between July and October 2020 caused it to miss expectations by $86 million, but the company benefited from an increase in online sales.

The company reported a fourth consecutive year of record profit in the 2021 financial year. It recorded $1.14 billion in sales, an increase of 19.9% on the previous year. Accent Group reported a reduction in sales in the second half of 2021 due to effects of the COVID-19 pandemic. Between July and October, more than 400 of its 700 stores were required to close because of lockdowns.

The business was affected by a drop in foot traffic in January 2022 due to the SARS-CoV-2 Omicron variant. The company decided against providing guidance for the first half of 2022 due to uncertainties around supply chains. However, fund manager Wilson Asset Management expected the company's performance to improve due to the easing of restrictions and increased foot traffic through its stores.

In February 2024, Accent announced it would end its franchise model for its The Athlete's Foot brand. At the time, the company owned 73 Athlete's Foot stores and the remaining 62 were franchised. Accent would not renew franchise agreements which were set to expire over the next five years and would explore acquiring stores.

In August 2024, British company Frasers Group acquired a 14.65% stake in Accent Group. It increased its stake to 19.57% in April 2025 when the two companies entered an agreement for Accent to launch and operate the Sports Direct chain in Australia and New Zealand for an initial term of 25 years. Accent plans to roll out at least 50 Sports Direct stores and an online store over the proceeding six years. As part of the deal, Accent also acquired Frasers’ discount online fashion marketplace, MySale, and will have access to Frasers portfolio of brands.

== Brands ==
=== Original brands ===
- 4Workers is a workwear brand. The first store was opened in May 2021.
- Article One is a modern Sydney fashion label established in 2016.
- Autry is a footwear brand with a 1980s American style.
- Beyond Her is an Australian casual fashion label.
- EXIE is an Australian women's active-streetwear label.
- First Muse is a label of form-fitting casual wear.
- Glue Store is an Australian premium fashion retailer. The brand was founded in 1998 and acquired by Accent in 2021. The business was wound down in the first half of 2026 and the Glue Store intellectual property and customer database was sold to Brand Collective in September 2026.

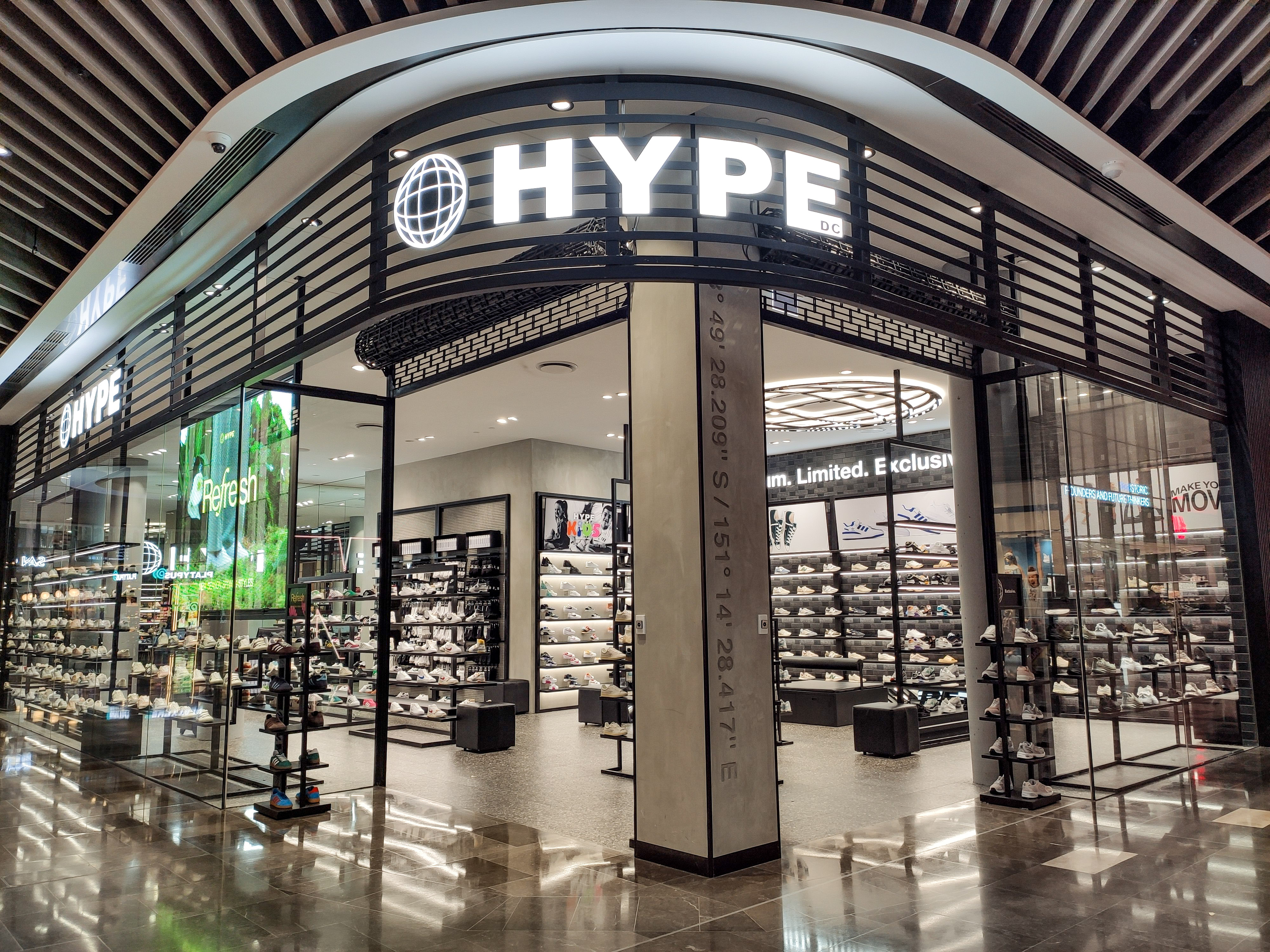
Hype DC store in Westfield Carousel

- Hype DC is an Australian and New Zealand sneaker shop chain.
- ITNO is a Melbourne footwear label.
- Stylerunner is a brand of women’s sportswear, activewear, and sneakers established in 2012. The brand was acquired by Accent Group in November 2019 after going into receivership. The brand's first flagship concept store opened in Mosman, Sydney in March 2022.
- Lulu & Rose is a contemporary nostalgia-themed womenswear label.
- Nude Lucy is a Sydney casual womenswear label established in 2010.
- PIVOT is an Australian clothing retail chain, selling a range of sportwear, casual wear and workwear.

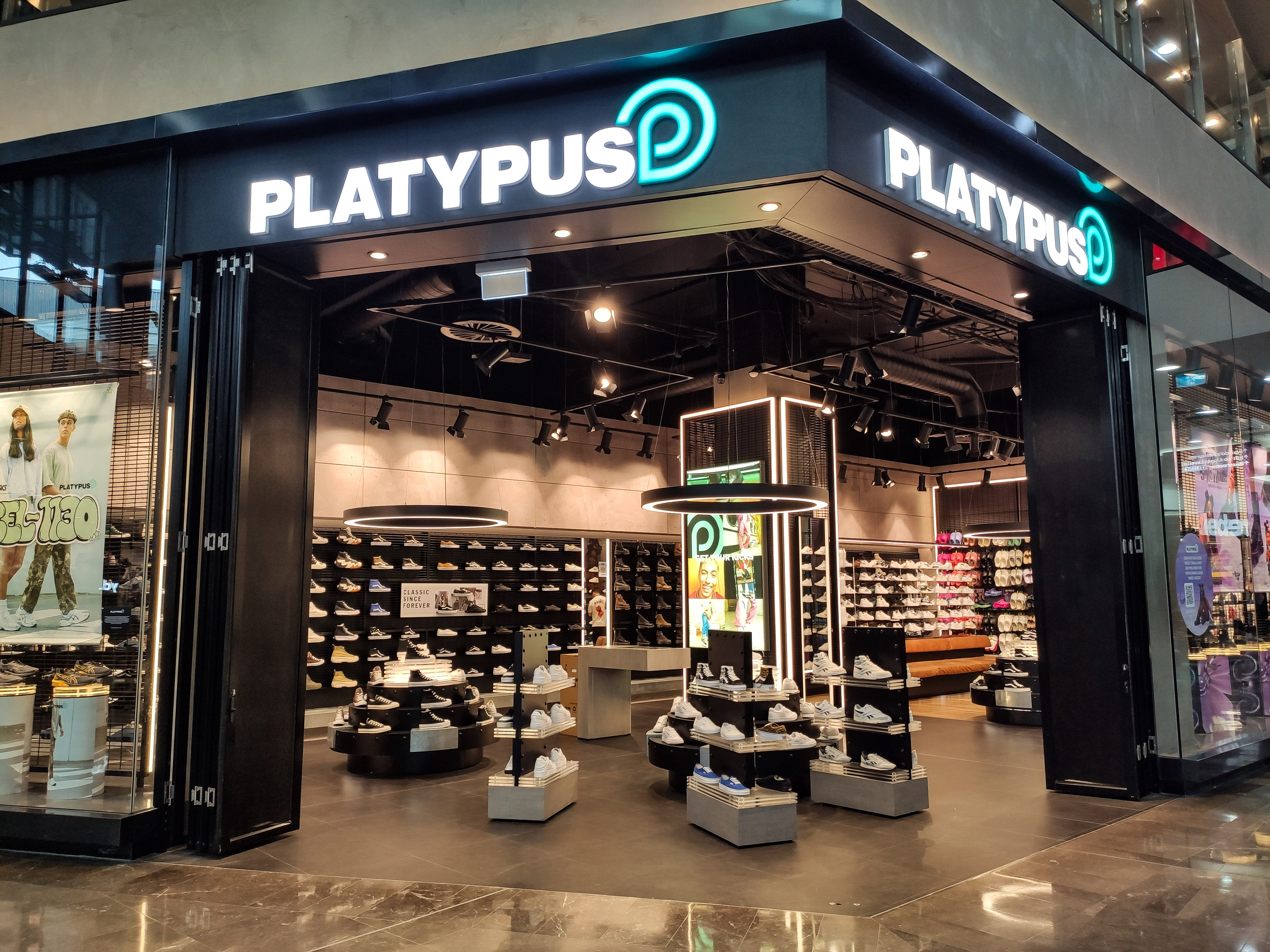
Platypus store in Westfield Carousel

- Platypus is an Australian and New Zealand footwear retail chain established in 1998. As of November 2023, there were 167 Platypus stores in Australia and 34 in New Zealand.
- SUBTYPE is a premium sneaker and apparel store established in Sydney in 2014. It has stores in Sydney, Melbourne, Auckland, Brisbane and Adelaide.
- The Trybe is a children's fashion brand. The business was sold in 2024.

=== Licensed brands ===
A Dr. Martens store in Sydney

- The Athlete's Foot is a Swiss footwear and apparel brand and retail chain.
- CAT Footwear and Apparel is a brand of clothing for manual worksites based on the Caterpillar Accent Group purchased the rights to the brand in 2010 and established its first retail store in Werribee, Melbourne in 2009. Accent did not renew its CAT distribution agreement after it expired at the end of 2024.
- Dr. Martens is an English footwear brand established in 2009. Accent Group established the brand's first factory outside the UK in Dunedin in 1989 and remains the exclusive distributor of the brand in Australia and New Zealand. There are Dr. Martens stores in Sydney, Melbourne, Gold Coast and Adelaide. There are also two stores in Auckland and a store in Wellington.
- Henleys is a British menswear and womenswear brand.
- Herschel Supply Co. is a Canadian brand of backpacks and accessories.
- Hoka One One is a running shoe brand owned by Deckers Brands. Accent Group became the exclusive Australian distributor in 2022.
- KWAY is a French waterproof jacket brand.
- Kappa is an Italian sportswear brand.
- Le Coq Sportif is a French sportwear brand established in 1882.
- Merrell is an American outdoor footwear brand. Accent Group obtained the rights to the brand in 2010 and opened 17 stores under its brand.
- Palladium is a French footwear brand which Accent Group obtained the rights for in 2011.
- Reebok is an American sports footwear and apparel brand which Accent Group obtained the rights for in the second quarter of 2022.
- Saucony is an American running footwear and apparel brand.
- Sebago is an American brand of boating and deck shoes and dress shoes.
- Sneaker Lab is a South African brand of sneakers and other shoes which Accent Group has been distributing through its retail stores since 2018.
- Skechers is an American footwear brand and retail chain
- Sperry is an American boat shoe brand which Accent Group has been distributing in Australia since 2014.
- Stance is an American sock, underwear and T-shirt brand founded in December 2009, which Accent Group has been distributing since 2011.
- Superga is an Italian tennis and shoe brand that was established in 1911.
- Supra is an American skateboarding shoe brand.
- Timberland is an American outdoor clothing and footwear brand and retail chain. There are three Timberland stores in Auckland and one in Wellington.
- Vans is an American skateboarding footwear and fashion brand.
