= Paul A. Sperry =

American inventor

Paul Alling Sperry
- Born: December 4, 1895; New Haven, Connecticut
- Died: November 7, 1982 (aged 86); New Haven, Connecticut
- Education: Taft School Dartmouth College
- Known for: Inventing the first boat shoe in 1935
- Title: Founder of Sperry Top-Sider
- Spouse: Pauline Letticia Jacques
- Parent: Sereno Clark Sperry Nettie Alling Sperry

Paul Alling Sperry (December 4, 1895 – November 7, 1982) was an American inventor, businessman, photographer, screen printer, sailor and outdoorsman. He designed the first boat shoe and founded Sperry (formerly Sperry Top-Sider), a sportswear company now headquartered in Waltham, Massachusetts.

== Early life and family ==
Paul Alling Sperry born in New Haven, Connecticut, the second of three sons born to Nettie Alling Sperry and Sereno Clark Sperry. His younger brother, Armstrong Wells Sperry, was a writer and illustrator of children's literature, best known for his 1941 Newbery Medal-winning book, Call It Courage. Sperry's father was a native of New Haven who served in leadership positions for several companies in the area, including the William Wells Company, the United States Finishing Company and the Pond Lily Company. His grandfather, William Wallace Sperry was a shipbuilder and served as a sergeant major in the 13th Connecticut Infantry Regiment during the American Civil War.

Sperry spent his early childhood in Stamford, Connecticut, and New York City. Accompanied by their mother, he and his brother Armstrong briefly attended school in Paris, France. Sperry received additional schooling at the Taft School in Connecticut. He spent a single freshman year at Dartmouth College in New Hampshire.

== Military service and marriage ==
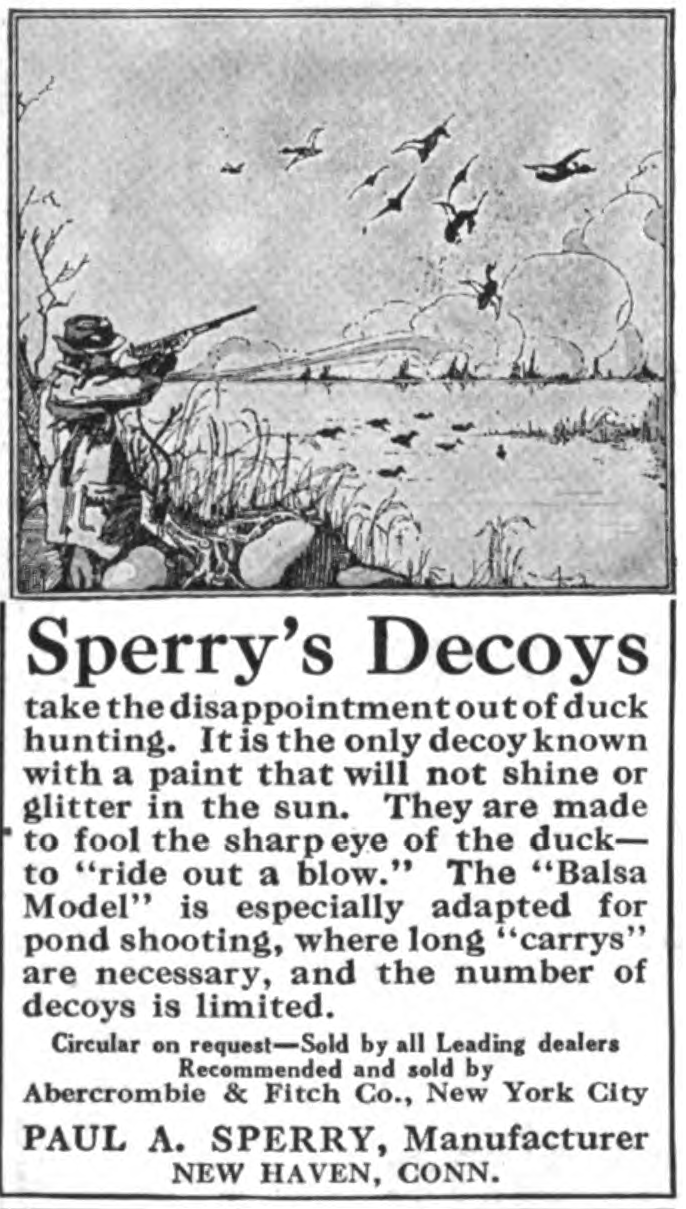
1921 advertisement for Sperry's Duck Decoy

Sperry worked as a salesman and in the master mechanics office of the United States Finishing Company of New York before joining the naval reserve in 1917. He served as Office Aid for Information, Section 1, 3rd Naval District, USNRF, and was released from duty as Seaman, First Class at the end of the year. Sperry married Pauline Letitia Jacques on December 30, 1922. They shared a love of the outdoors, sailing and traveling. The Sperrys spent their honeymoon on Chincoteague Island, Virginia, hunting ducks in separate duck blinds.

== Duck decoys ==
An avid outdoorsman and bird hunter, Sperry designed and produced some of the first balsa wood duck decoys in the early 1920s. He started Sperry Natural Decoys, whose buyers included Abercrombie & Fitch and Kirkland Brothers. The company's sole supplier of raw materials, the American Balsa Company, raised its prices, which contributed to Sperry closing the business after fulfillment of its final orders.

== Sailing ==
In the early 1930s, Paul purchased his first boat, Gilnockie. In 1935, Gilnockie won second prize in the Vineyard Race sponsored by the Stamford Yacht Club. He bought his second boat from Nova Scotia: a schooner named Sirocco after the hot winds of the Libyan deserts. The boat was later damaged during the 1938 New England hurricane at Davis Island in Connecticut. Its replacement, the Sirocco II, arrived in New Haven in 1939. It was during these early sailing years Sperry learned that painted decks were very hazardous. He said, "I had the idea of repainting and lightly dusting with fine emery dust, but sandpaper had poor results on skin."

== Sperry Top-Sider ==
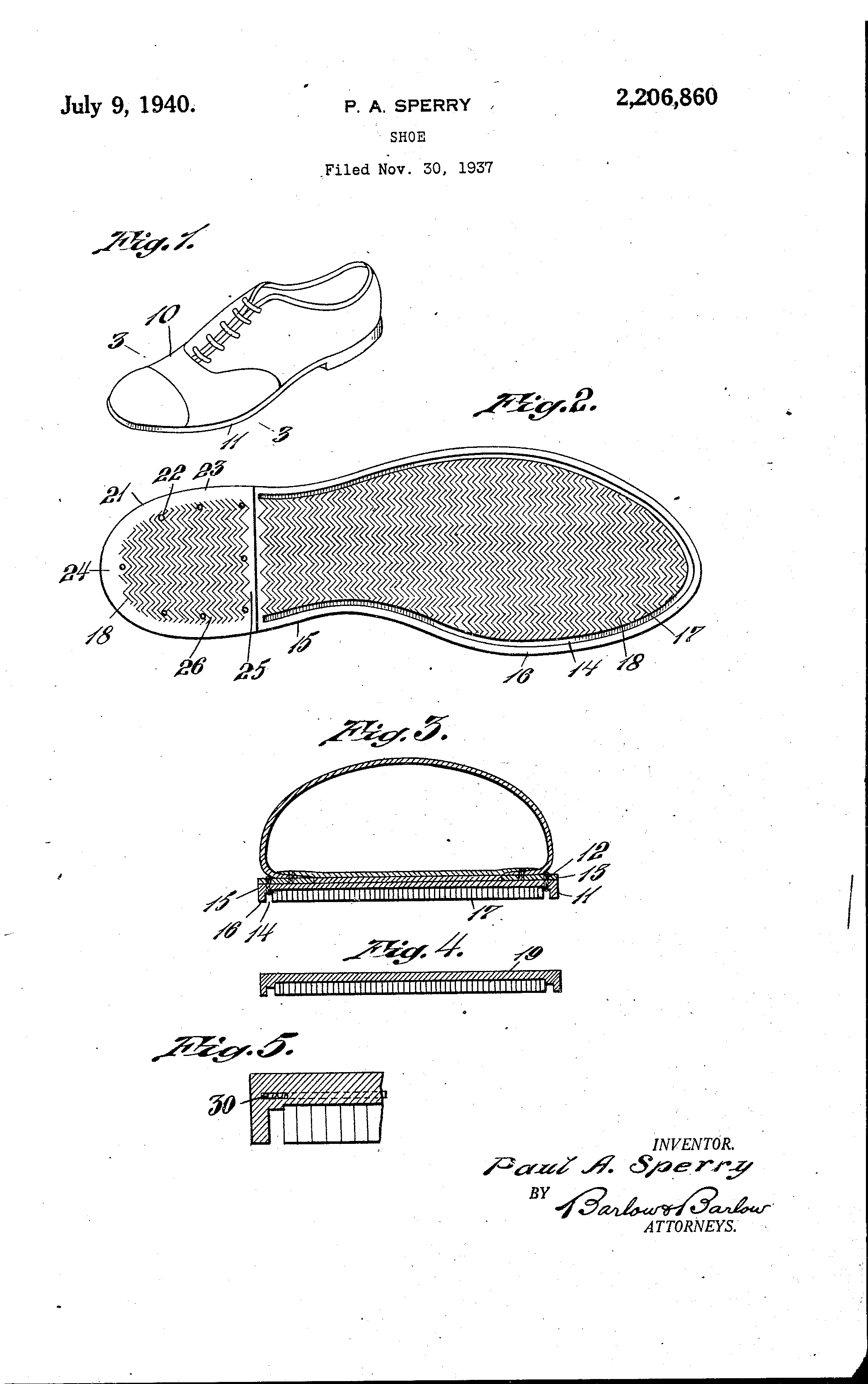
Drawing from the patent for the Sperry Top-Sider, 1937

While sailing on the Long Island Sound, Sperry slipped on the deck and fell overboard. He was able to pull himself back on board, but the experience drove him to develop a non-slip shoe. While experimenting with possibilities for non-slip shoes, he noticed his dogs' ability to run down the icy hill without slipping. The grooves on their paws inspired him to try cutting grooved patterns (siping) in a natural rubber sole.

Sperry tried various patterns of siping and settled on a herringbone pattern as the most effective. He cemented the prototype soles to a pair of canvas sneakers and gave them to Leon Burkowski, the young man who looked after his boat. When Sperry and his wife returned, "Leon immediately threw a bucket of water on the deck and yelled, 'watch.'" He took a running start and stopped dead in his tracks. This was the invention of the first pair of Sperry Top-Siders.

In 1937, Sperry applied for a United States patent for his non-skid sole. He first offered the patent to the United States Rubber Company of Connecticut. The company turned him down because the sole would cost $4.50, when an expensive shoe at the time cost $3.75. Sperry then offered the patent to Converse Rubber Company in Boston, Massachusetts, which agreed to make blank rubber soles and ship them to Sperry for siping and then assemble the finished shoes and return them to Sperry for sale. Sperry developed a machine for cutting the non-skid design into the soles and launched the project working in his spare hours while employed full-time at the Pond Lily Company.

A friend, Donald White, who worked as an advertising salesman for McGraw-Hill, suggested Sperry sell directly by mail and helped him compose a letter to send to all 500 of Sperry's fellow members of the Cruising Club of America. Sperry received responses and requests for shoes from all 500 members. Confident that he had a winning product, he started a mail order business, while also selling the shoes through the Commonwealth Shoe & Leather Company in Boston and a small direct mail catalog.

In the later 1930s, Sperry continued work on developing a more durable and functional boat shoe. He worked with the United States Rubber Company, which developed a rubber compound for traction and wear that could be more easily siped, and with the Commonwealth Shoe & Leather Company on a new leather shoe design made with specially tanned leather. Sperry's new design had a unique "saddle" through which rawhide laces were pulled—the now-familiar Sperry Authentic Original boat shoe.

In 1939, the United States War Department specified Sperry Top-Sider as one of the official shoes of the Navy and negotiated the right to manufacture the shoes for its sailors. It became the official footwear of the casual uniform of the United States Naval Academy. In 1940, Sperry sold his business to the United States Rubber Company, which successfully marketed the shoe across the United States.

== Later career and death ==
Sperry was interested in photography from an early age. His black and white photographs of Cannon Mountain in New Hampshire from 1938 to 1940 were donated by the Sperry Family to the New England Ski Museum in 2007. In 1950, Sperry founded Sirocco Screenprinters in North Haven, Connecticut and served as its president until his death. The company made screenprints of artwork by Josef Albers, Robert Indiana, Roy Lichtenstein, and others, which can be viewed on the websites of the Museum of Modern Art in New York City and the Art Institute of Chicago.

Sperry was named corporate secretary of the Pond Lily Company in 1941 and president and director of the Guider Specialty Company in 1955. He held both positions until the late 1970s. He also served as a director of the Echlin Manufacturing Company and president and treasurer of the Sperry Real Estate Corporation. Sperry died on November 7, 1982, in New Haven, Connecticut, at the age of 86.

== Sources ==
Books

- Directory of the Offices and Students of Dartmouth College and Associated Schools. 1915.
- Hill, Everett Gleason (1918). A modern history of New Haven and eastern New Haven County. Vol. 2. New York, New York: S.J. Clarke Publishing Company. OCLC 4053489.
- Monagan, Charles A. (2006). Connecticut Icons: 50 Symbols of the Nutmeg State. Guilford, Connecticut: Globe Pequot Press. ISBN 978-0-7627-3548-8.

Newspapers

- "Delight Winner of Stamford Race". Brooklyn Eagle. September 3, 1935. p. 16.
- "Nonskid Sneakers Invented". The New Haven Register. October 9, 1977.
- "The "Sure" Decoy (advertisement)". Field and Stream. September 1921. p. 545.
- "Paul Sperry, textile chief; designer of boating shoe". The New Haven Register. November 9, 1982.

Patent

- USA 2206860, Sperry, Paul Alling, "Shoe", published July 9, 1940, issued November 30, 1937

Website

- "Our Story". Discover and Learn More About Us. Sperry. 2015.
