= Gillham =

Gillham may refer to:

- Gillham, Arkansas, a town in Sevier County, Arkansas, United States
- Gillham Lake, a reservoir in Howard County and Polk County, Arkansas

== People with the surname ==
- Art Gillham (1895–1961), American songwriter
- Jayson Gillham (born 1986), Australian classical pianist
- Mary Gillham (1921–2013), English naturalist and writer
- Nicholas Gillham (1932–2018), American geneticist
- Ron Gillham, American politician

== See also ==
- Gillham Road, a street in Kansas, Missouri
- Gillham code
