= Boater (disambiguation) =

A boater is a type of hat.

Boater may also refer to:

- Boater, one of the first disposable diapers
- Someone involved in boating
- Boaters, a term which refers to a pair of boat shoe
