= Matchlock =

Firearm mechanism

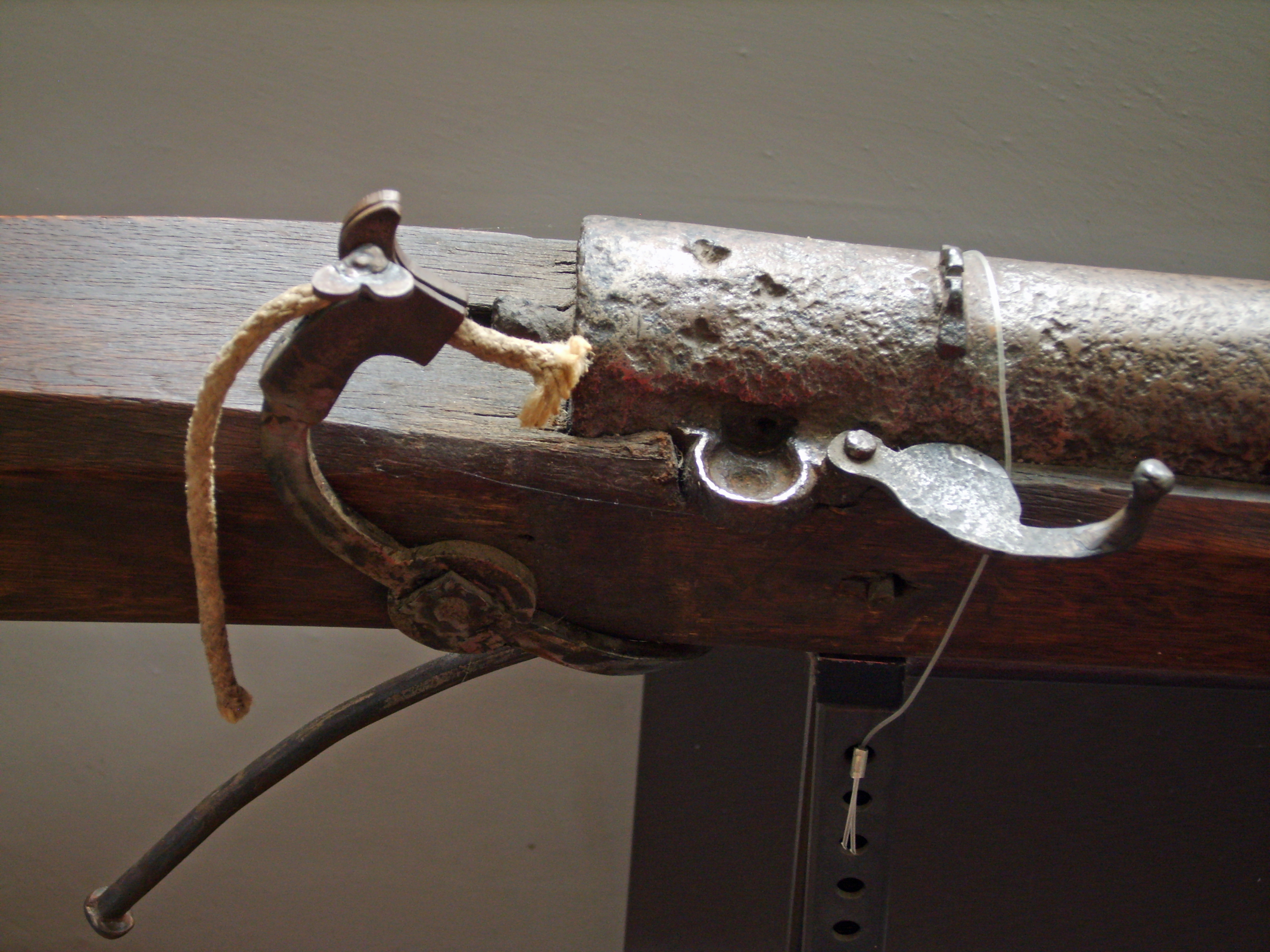
Early German musket with serpentine lock.

A matchlock or firelock is a historical type of firearm wherein the gunpowder is ignited by a burning piece of flammable cord or twine that is in contact with the gunpowder through a mechanism that the musketeer activates by pulling a lever or trigger with their finger. This firing mechanism was an improvement over the hand cannon, which lacked a trigger and required the musketeer or an assistant to apply a match directly to the gunpowder by hand. The matchlock mechanism allowed the musketeer to apply the match himself without losing his concentration.

== Description ==
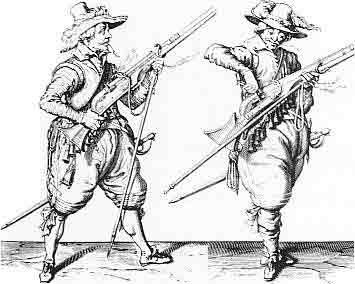
Engraving of musketeers from the Thirty Years' War

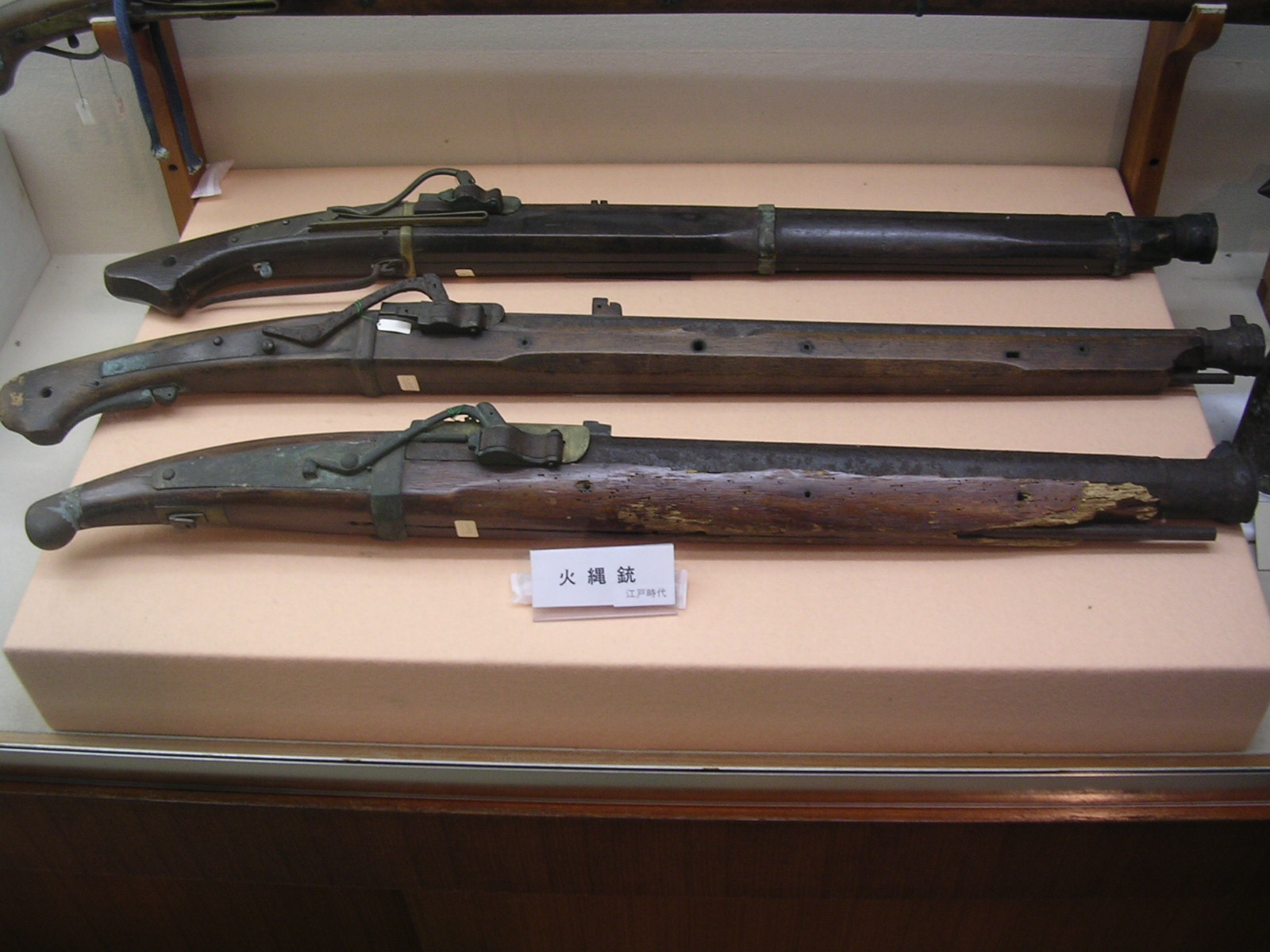
Various Japanese (samurai) Edo-period matchlocks (tanegashima)

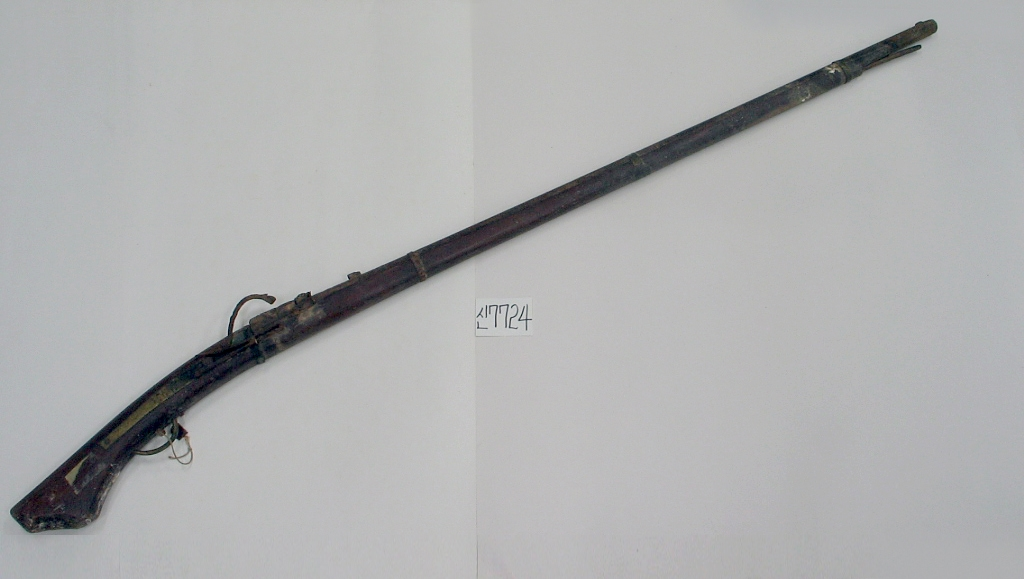
Jochong (조총/鳥銃), the Korean matchlock musket

The classic matchlock gun held a burning slow match in a clamp at the end of a small curved lever known as the serpentine. Upon the pull of a lever (or in later models a trigger) protruding from the bottom of the gun and connected to the serpentine, the clamp dropped down, lowering the smoldering match into the flash pan and igniting the priming powder. The flash from the primer traveled through the touch hole, igniting the main charge of propellant in the gun barrel. On the release of the lever or trigger, the spring-loaded serpentine would move in reverse to clear the pan. The match would then be removed before reloading the gun. Both ends of the match were usually kept alight in case one end should be accidentally extinguished.

Earlier types had only an S-shaped serpentine pinned to the stock either behind or in front of the flash pan (the so-called "serpentine lock"), one end of which was manipulated to bring the match into the pan.

A later addition to the gun was the rifled barrel. This made the gun much more accurate at longer distances but did have drawbacks, the main one being that it took much longer to reload because the bullet had to be pounded down into the barrel.

A type of matchlock was developed called the snap matchlock, in which the serpentine was brought to firing position by a weak spring, and activated by pressing a button, pulling a trigger, or even pulling a short string passing into the mechanism. As the match was often extinguished after its collision with the flash pan, this type was not used by soldiers but was often used in fine target weapons where the precision of the shot was more important than the repetition.

An inherent weakness of the matchlock was the necessity of keeping the match constantly lit. This was chiefly a problem in wet weather, when damp match cord was difficult to light and to keep burning. Another drawback was the burning match itself. At night, the match would glow in the darkness, possibly revealing the carrier's position. The distinctive smell of burning match-cord was also a giveaway of a musketeer's position. It was also quite dangerous when soldiers were carelessly handling large quantities of gunpowder (for example, while refilling their powder horns) with lit matches present. This was one reason why soldiers in charge of transporting and guarding ammunition were amongst the first to be issued self-igniting guns like the wheellock and snaphance.

The matchlock was also uneconomical to keep ready for long periods of time, as keeping both ends of a match lit every night for a year required a mile of match.

== History ==
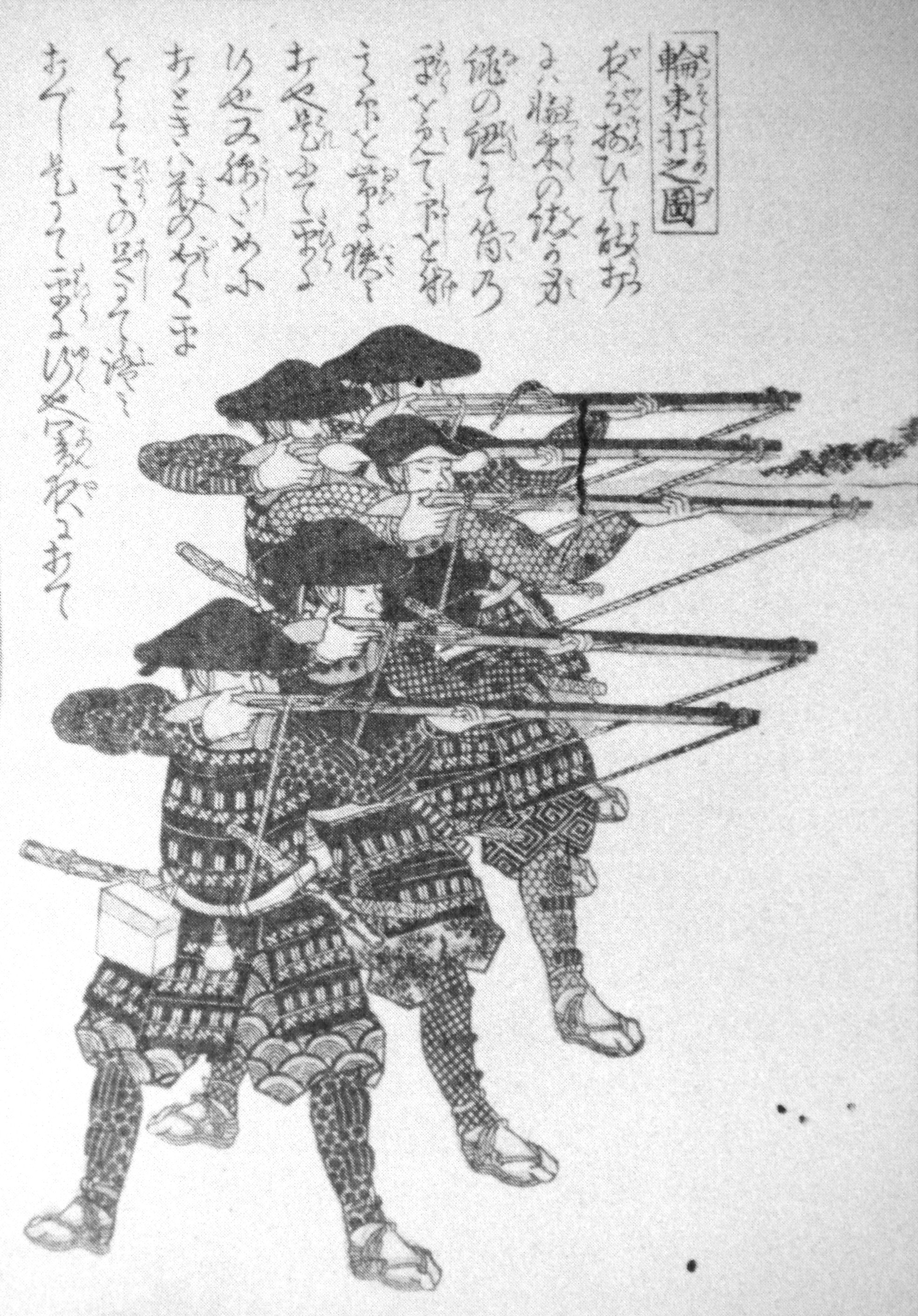
Japanese peasant foot soldiers (ashigaru) firing tanegashima (matchlocks)

The earliest form of matchlock in Europe appeared by 1411 and in the Ottoman Empire by 1425. This early arquebus was a hand cannon with a serpentine lever to hold matches. However this early arquebus did not have the matchlock mechanism traditionally associated with the weapon. The exact dating of the matchlock addition is disputed. The first references to the use of what may have been matchlock arquebuses (tüfek) by the Janissary corps of the Ottoman Army date them from 1394 to 1465. However it is unclear whether these were arquebuses or small cannons as late as 1444, but according to Gábor Ágoston the fact that they were listed separately from cannons in mid-15th century inventories suggest they were handheld firearms, though he admits this is disputable. Godfrey Goodwin dates the first use of the matchlock arquebus by the Janissaries to no earlier than 1465. The idea of a serpentine later appeared in an Austrian manuscript dated to the mid-15th century. According to Korean historian Hyeok Hweon Kang, writing for the American Society of Arms Collectors in 2022, the evidence for a European origin of the matchlock is “overwhelming”. The first dated illustration of a matchlock mechanism dates to 1475, and by the 16th century they were universally used. During this time the latest tactic in using the matchlock was to line up and send off a volley of musket balls at the enemy. This volley would be much more effective than single soldiers trying to hit individual targets.

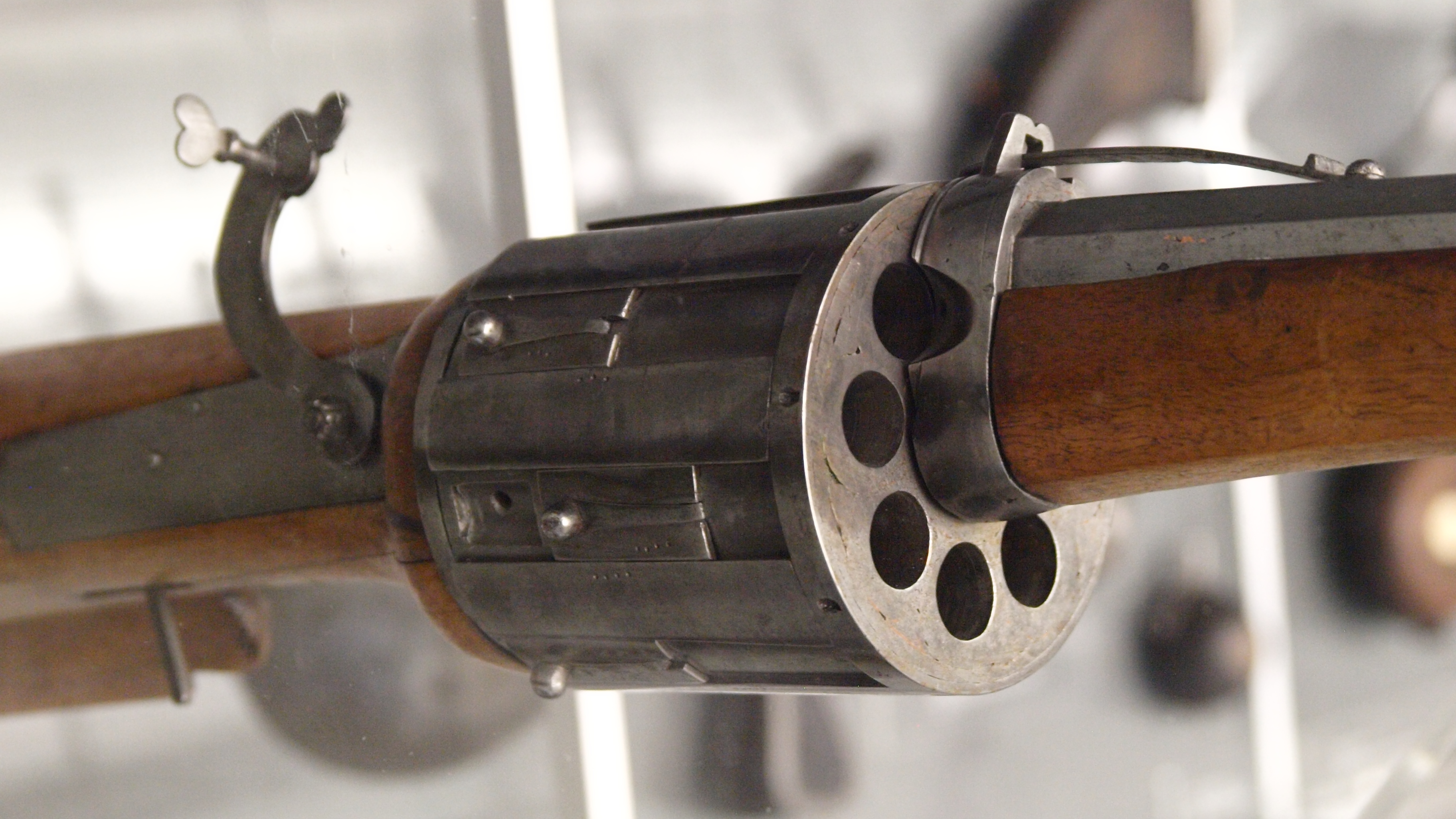
Eight-shot matchlock revolver (Germany c. 1580)

Robert Elgood theorizes the armies of the Italian states used the arquebus in the 15th century, but this may be a type of hand cannon, not matchlocks with trigger mechanism. He agreed that the matchlock first appeared in Western Europe during the 1470s in Germany. Improved versions of the Ottoman arquebus were transported to India by Babur in 1526.

The matchlock was claimed to have been introduced to China by the Portuguese. The Chinese obtained the matchlock arquebus technology from the Portuguese in the 16th century and matchlock firearms were used by the Chinese into the 19th century. The Chinese used the term "bird-gun" to refer to muskets and Turkish muskets may have reached China before Portuguese ones.

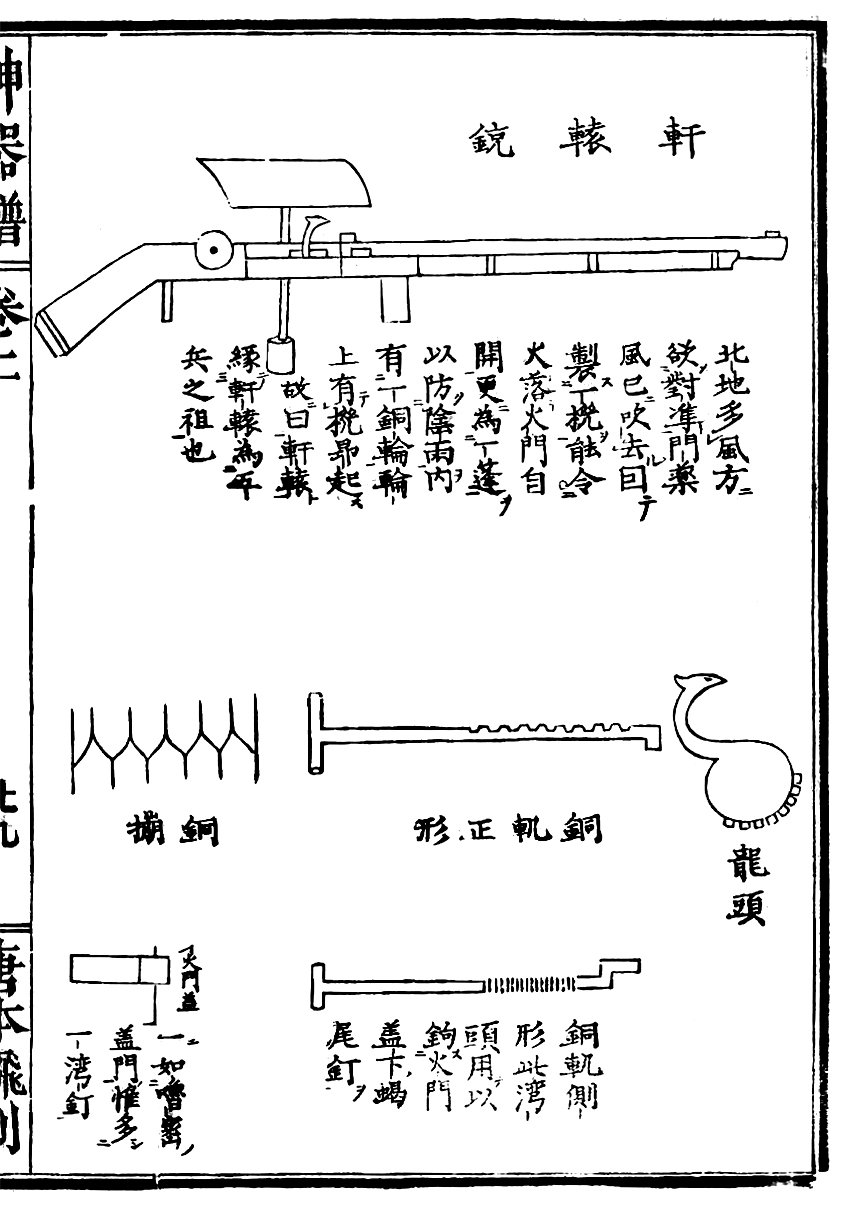
A Chinese Arquebus with a rain cover, c. 1598

In Japan, the first documented introduction of the matchlock, which became known as the tanegashima, was through the Portuguese in 1543. The tanegashima seems to have been based on snap matchlocks that were produced in the armory of Goa in Portuguese India, which was captured by the Portuguese in 1510. While the Japanese were technically able to produce tempered steel (e.g. sword blades), they preferred to use work-hardened brass springs in their matchlocks. The name tanegashima came from the island where a Chinese junk (a type of ship) with Portuguese adventurers on board was driven to anchor by a storm. The lord of the Japanese island Tanegashima Tokitaka (1528–1579) purchased two matchlock rifles from the Portuguese and put a swordsmith to work copying the matchlock barrel and firing mechanism. Within a few years, the use of the tanegashima in battle forever changed the way war was fought in Japan.

Despite the appearance of more advanced ignition systems, such as that of the wheellock and the snaphance, the low cost of production, simplicity, and high availability of the matchlock kept it in use in European armies. It left service around 1750. It was eventually completely replaced by the flintlock as the foot soldier's main armament.

In Japan, matchlocks continued to see military use up to the mid-19th century. In China, matchlock guns were still being used by imperial army soldiers in the middle decades of the 19th century.

There is evidence that matchlock rifles may have been in use among some peoples in Christian Abyssinia in the late Middle Ages. Although modern rifles were imported into Ethiopia during the 19th century, contemporary British historians noted that, along with slingshots, matchlock rifle weapons were used by the elderly for self-defense and by the militaries of the Ras.

Under Qing rule, the Hakka on Taiwan owned matchlock muskets. Han people traded and sold matchlock muskets to the Taiwanese aborigines. During the Sino-French War, the Hakka and Aboriginals used their matchlock muskets against the French in the Keelung Campaign and Battle of Tamsui. The Hakka used their matchlock muskets to resist the Japanese invasion of Taiwan (1895) and Han Taiwanese and Aboriginals conducted an insurgency against Japanese rule.

== 20th century use ==
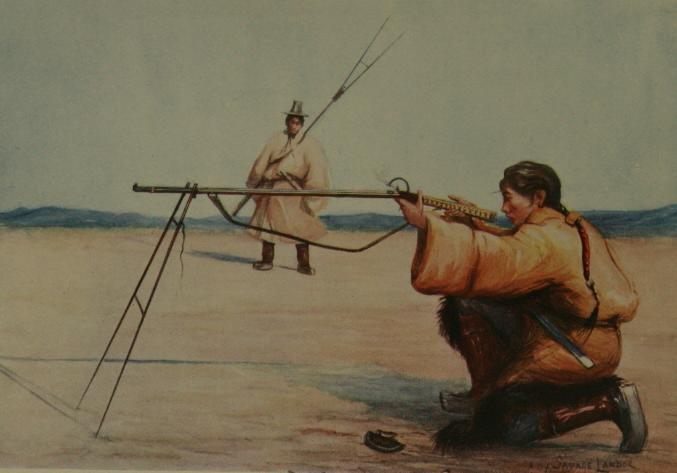
Tibetans with matchlock rifle (1905 painting)

Arabian Bedouin families continued using matchlocks well into the 20th century, and matchlocks were often passed down as family heirlooms within Bedouin families. The reliability of the matchlock made it the weapon of choice for Bedouins, who sometimes chose to convert flintlocks into matchlocks.

Tibetans have used matchlocks from as early as the sixteenth century until very recently. The early 20th century explorer Sven Hedin also encountered Tibetan tribesmen on horseback armed with matchlock rifles along the Tibetan border with Xinjiang. Tibetan nomad fighters used arquebuses for warfare during the Annexation of Tibet by the People's Republic of China as late as the second half of the 20th century—and Tibetan nomads reportedly still use matchlock rifles to hunt wolves and other predatory animals. These matchlock arquebuses typically feature a long, sharpened retractable forked stand.

== Literary references ==
A Spanish matchlock, purchased in Holland, plays an important role in Walter D. Edmonds' children's novel The Matchlock Gun.

== See also ==
- Arquebus
