= Paul Sperry =

Paul Sperry may refer to:

- Paul Sperry (lyric tenor) (1934–2024), American lyric tenor
- Paul A. Sperry (1895–1982), American inventor, businessman, photographer, screen printer and sailor
- Paul E. Sperry, American author and investigative journalist
