= Elizabeth Enright =

American writer (1907–1968)

- Born: Elizabeth Wright Enright; September 17, 1907; Oak Park, Illinois
- Died: June 8, 1968 (aged 60); Wainscott, Long Island, New York, U.S.
- Occupations: Writer, illustrator
- Spouse: Robert Gillham
- Children: Nicholas, Robert, Oliver
- Writing career
- Period: 1935–1968
- Genre: Children's fiction
- Notable works: Thimble Summer (1938); Gone-Away Lake (1957); Return to Gone-Away (1961); The Saturdays (1941); The Four-Story Mistake (1942); Then There Were Five (1944); Spiderweb for Two: A Melendy Maze (1951)
- Notable awards: Newbery Medal; 1939

Elizabeth Wright Enright Gillham (September 17, 1907 – June 8, 1968) was an American writer of children's books, an illustrator, writer of short stories for adults, literary critic and teacher of creative writing. Perhaps best known as the Newbery Medal-winning author of Thimble Summer (1938) and the Newbery runner-up Gone-Away Lake (1957), she also wrote the popular Melendy quartet (1941 to 1951). A Newbery Medal laureate and a multiple winner of the O. Henry Award, her short stories and articles for adults appeared in many popular magazines and have been reprinted in anthologies and textbooks.

In 2012 Gone-Away Lake was ranked number 42 among all-time children's novels in a survey published by School Library Journal, a monthly with primarily U.S. audience. The first two Melendy books also made the Top 100, The Saturdays (novel) and The Four-Story Mistake.

== Biography ==
Enright was born September 17, 1907, in Oak Park, Illinois. Her father, Walter J. Enright, was a political cartoonist. Her mother, Maginel Wright Enright (the younger sister of famous American architect Frank Lloyd Wright), was also a book and magazine illustrator, a shoe designer for Capezio, and author of the memoir, The Valley of the God-Almighty Joneses. The Enrights divorced when Elizabeth was eleven, and after that she attended boarding school in Connecticut. Her mother remarried, becoming Maginel Wright Barney. Originally, Enright intended to be a dancer, and for a time she studied under the famous Martha Graham. Her summers were spent on Nantucket Island, off the coast of New England, a location she later used in some of her books.

Preparing for a career as an illustrator, Enright studied at the Art Students League of New York in 1927–1928, and at the Parsons School of Design, Paris. Enright also reviewed children's literature for The New York Times, taught creative writing at Barnard College, a women's college affiliated with the then all-male Columbia University in New York City's Morningside Heights neighborhood on the Upper Westside (1960–1962), and led writing seminars at colleges across the U.S.A.

Enright married Robert Gillham, an advertising executive with the J. Walter Thompson agency, April 24, 1930. They had three sons: Nicholas, Robert and Oliver (1948–2008).

She died aged 60 in her home in Wainscott, Long Island, New York State on June 8, 1968. Her obituary in The New York Times states that she "died in her sleep at her home... after a short illness."

She is buried in Wainscott Cemetery in Wainscott, Long Island, New York State in Suffolk County, New York, next to her husband and mother. There is also a flat stone commemorative tablet for Elizabeth Enright, along with her husband and mother in Unity Chapel Cemetery in rural Spring Green, Wisconsin, where many members of her mother's family, the Lloyd-Joneses, are buried. The cemetery is adjacent to her uncle Frank Lloyd Wright's landmark home, Taliesin.

== Career ==
Beginning as a magazine illustrator, in 1930 Enright illustrated Marian King's Kees, a children's book about a Dutch boy and his pet duck. At one point Enright developed a series of sketches with an African flair. She then wrote a story to go with them, and in 1935 her first book, Kintu: A Congo Adventure was published. It is significant that reviewers sometimes preferred the story over the pictures, as this encouraged Enright to turn more and more to writing. After 1951 her children's books were illustrated by other artists.

Her next book, Thimble Summer, (1938), blended memories of summers spent on Frank Lloyd Wright's farm in Wisconsin and family stories from her mother and grandmother. It received the Newbery Medal for 1939, making Enright, at thirty, one of the youngest writers ever to win the award.

Enright's Gone-Away Lake appeared two decades later in 1957 and became a Newbery Honor book. It also received the New York Herald Tribune's Children's Spring Book Festival Award. In 1963, the American Library Association named Gone-Away Lake as the United States nominee for the international Hans Christian Andersen Award, from the International Board on Books for Young People (announced at the Bologna Children's Book Fair in Bologna, Italy, and presented by Queen Ingrid of Denmark). In 1970, thirteen years after its publication, the book also received the Lewis Carroll Shelf Award. The first editions of Gone-Away Lake and its 1961 sequel, Return to Gone-Away, were illustrated by noted illustrators Joe and Beth Krush. In the early twenty-first century, reissued American editions of the Gone-Away books featured cover art by Harry Potter illustrator Mary GrandPre but retained the Krushes' interior illustrations.

Enright also wrote the popular Melendy Quartet, a series of four children's novels published between 1941 and 1951: The Saturdays (novel), The Four-Story Mistake, Then There Were Five, and Spiderweb for Two: A Melendy Maze. This series tells the adventures of four siblings who live in New York City and later in upstate New York with their father, an economist, and a housekeeper named Cuffy.

Tatsinda, a traditional fairy tale, was named an Honor Book at the 1963 New York Herald Tribune's Children's Spring Book Festival. Enright's final children's book, Zeee, the story of a naughty fairy, appeared in 1966.

Enright's short stories for adult readers were published in magazines such as The New Yorker, Ladies Home Journal, Cosmopolitan, The Yale Review, Harper's Magazine (monthly) and The Saturday Evening Post. They have been reprinted in anthologies, including The Best American Short Stories (1951, 1952) and O. Henry Prize Stories (1946, 1949, 1950, 1960); and were collected in Borrowed Summer and Other Stories, The Moment Before the Rain, and The Riddle of the Fly. Her final book, Doublefields: Memories and Stories, is a combination of short fiction and tales from her own life experiences.

== Reception and legacy ==
According to children's literature expert May Hill Arbuthnot, "Elizabeth Enright has a gift for realism" and her style is "forthright and lively". Speaking of the Melendy series, Anita Silvey wrote, "These cosmopolitan children are intelligent, artistic, affectionate, and, most of all, interesting." Reviewer Irene Haas says Enright's "Keen perception of childhood and her remarkable gifts as a writer place her books among the select few that are timeless and enduring." She goes on to say her books are ones to "become deeply involved in, to absorb easily and happily and to remember always."

According to Charisse Gendron, "Enright's most original contribution to children's literature remains her humorous and lyrical description of characters... They are ardently individual, each one, and... fascinating to read about."

== Works ==
=== Children's books ===
- 1935 - Kintu: A Congo Adventure, Farrar & Rinehart;
- 1938 - Thimble Summer, Farrar & Rinehart — Newbery Medal Winner
- 1940 - The Sea Is All Around, Farrar & Rinehart
- 1951 - A Christmas Tree for Lydia, Henry Holt and Company — a small-format gift book illustrated by the author; originally published in the magazine Woman's Home Companion as "A Tree for Lydia")
- 1957 - Gone-Away Lake, Harcourt, Brace & World, Inc. — Newbery Honor book, ALA Notable Book
- 1961 - Return to Gone-Away, Harcourt, Brace & World, Inc.
- 1963 - Tatsinda, Harcourt, Brace & World, Inc.
- 1965 - Zeee, Harcourt, Brace & World, Inc.

Melendy quartet

- 1941 - The Saturdays, Farrar & Rinehart — ALA Notable Book
- 1942 - The Four-Story Mistake, Farrar & Rinehart
- 1944 - Then There Were Five, Farrar & Rinehart
- 1951 - Spiderweb for Two: A Melendy Maze, Farrar & Rinehart

=== Collections of short stories for adults ===
- 1946 - Borrowed Summer and Other Stories, Rinehart
- 1951 - The Moment Before the Rain, Harcourt, Brace & World, Inc.
- 1956 - The Riddle of the Fly and Other Stories, Harcourt, Brace & World, Inc.
- 1966 - Doublefields: Memories and Stories, Harcourt, Brace & World, Inc.

=== Other works ===
- "The Hero's Changing Face", in The Contents of the Basket, Spain, Francis (editor), New York Public Library, 1960;
- "Newbery Medal Acceptance Speech", The Horn Book Magazine, July 1939, pp. 231–235;
- "Realism in Children's Literature", The Horn Book Magazine, April 1967, pp. 2165–170.

== See also ==
- Tale for a Deaf Ear, a 1957 opera based on a story by Enright
