= Return to Gone-Away =

- First edition cover with Krush artwork
- Author: Elizabeth Enright
- Illustrator: Beth and Joe Krush
- Cover artist: Krush
- Genre: Children's novel
- Publisher: Harcourt, Brace & World
- Publication date: 1961
- Publication place: United States
- Media type: Print (hardcover, paperback), audiobook
- Pages: 191 pp.
- OCLC: 905159
- LC Class: PZ7.E724 Re
- Preceded by: Gone-Away Lake

Return To Gone-Away is a children's book written by Elizabeth Enright, which is the sequel to the book Gone-Away Lake and discusses how the Blake family buys a house in Gone-Away. The book was first published in 1961.

== Plot introduction ==
When Portia learns of her parents buying Villa Caprice, a tumbledown Victorian house close to Gone-Away Lake, she is excited. She, her brother Foster and her cousin Julian enjoy learning about the "new" old house, with the help of elderly neighbors Mr. Payton and Mrs. Cheever.
