= Armstrong Sperry =

American writer and illustrator (1897–1976)

Armstrong Wells Sperry
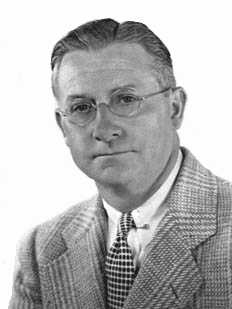
- Born: November 7, 1897; New Haven, Connecticut
- Died: April 26, 1976 (aged 78); Hanover, New Hampshire, US
- Occupations: Writer, illustrator
- Spouse(s): Margaret Mitchell Robertson, M.D. (m. 1930)
- Children: Susan, John
- Writing career
- Period: 1933–?
- Genre: Children's literature
- Website: armstrongsperry.com

Armstrong Wells Sperry (November 7, 1897 – April 26, 1976) was an American writer and illustrator of children's literature. His books include historical fiction and biography, often set on sailing ships, and stories of boys from Polynesia, Asia and indigenous American cultures. He is best known for his 1941 Newbery Medal-winning book Call It Courage.

== Early training as an artist ==
Born the third and youngest son of a businessman in New Haven, Sperry attended Stamford Preparatory School from 1908 to 1915. His older brother Paul A. Sperry invented what became the first boat shoe, the Sperry Top-Sider. He attended the Art Students League of New York from 1915 to 1918, where he studied with F. Luis Mora and George Bellows. He then studied at the Yale School of Art in the fall of 1918 until drafted into the United States Navy at the very end of World War I.

Inspired by reading the work of Herman Melville, Robert Louis Stevenson, and Jack London as a boy, and then Frederick O'Brien's White Shadows in the South Seas in 1919, he traveled around the South Pacific from October 1920 to May 1921, spending time on Tahiti, Raiatea, Bora Bora, New Zealand, Australia, the Fiji Islands, and Hawaii. In December 1921, one of his paintings of the South Seas was exhibited at the Art Centre, NYC.

In the summer of 1922, Sperry was introduced to Kenneth Emory, an ethnologist at the Bishop Museum, Honolulu, by his foster sister, Anne Kinnear. He spent the spring of 1923 studying at the Académie Colarossi in Paris, and continued to enroll at the Art Students League during the 1920s and early 1930s.

From September 1924 to May 1925, he was employed as an assistant to Kenneth Emory on board the Kaimiloa, a yacht owned by Medford Kellum, sailing from Hawaii to Fanning Island, Christmas Island, Malden Island, Penrhyn Island, Tahiti, Bora Bora and Raiatea on scientific research, before sailing to San Francisco in June 1925. During the voyage he continued to paint, later exhibiting his work in Honolulu.

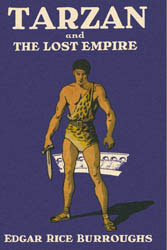
Dustjacket by Armstrong Sperry for the first edition of Tarzan and the Lost Empire by Edgar Rice Burroughs

Returning to New York in 1925, he worked in an advertising agency, "drawing vacuum cleaners, milk bottles, Campbell's Soup, etc.", then he had steady work as an illustrator of pulp romances, primarily for All-Story Love Stories for the Frank A. Munsey Company, and adventure and romance newspaper serials for Metropolitan Newspaper Service/United Feature Syndicate, including many 72-part stories by Mildred Barbour. He started writing his own adventure stories with tales of the South Seas that were syndicated by Metropolitan. He illustrated books and dust jackets for other writers, including the first edition of Tarzan and the Lost Empire by Edgar Rice Burroughs in 1929 and the first of several books he would illustrate for Helen Follet, Magic Portholes in 1932. He married Margaret Robertson, a medical doctor and daughter of San Francisco bookseller and publisher A. M. Robertson, in 1930, whom he had met on his trip to Hawaii in 1925.

== From illustrator to award-winning writer ==
Sperry's first book, One Day with Manu, a colorfully illustrated tale of everyday life in Bora Bora, appeared in 1933. Critic Joan McGrath, cautions modern readers to take his depictions of other cultures in context, stating,

"His early work, such as the tales of Manu, Jambi, and Tuktu, are unlikely to be found in library collections of today, in an era rendered more sensitive to the feelings of minority cultures and racial pride than in the 1930s. Coloured as they were by the prevailing attitudes of his day, Sperry's ethnological works for young readers would by critics of today be stigmatized as condescending in their approach: it is all too easy to lose the historical perspective that would credit him with enlightenment and objectivity, given their date of publication."

Sperry's great-grandfather was a sea captain, inspiring his love of the ocean and his book All Sail Set about the clipper ship Flying Cloud, which won him a Newbery Honor Book award in 1936. Although settled in New Canaan, Connecticut, in 1934, Sperry and his family lived Santa Fe, New Mexico, for a year, inspiring several books, including Wagons Westward: The Story of the Old Trail to Santa Fe in 1936 and Little Eagle, a Navaho Boy in 1938.

Dustjacket of the first printing of Call It Courage

On February 13, 1940 Call It Courage was published by The MacMillan Company, the story about a young boy on the island of Hikueru in Polynesia written and illustrated by Sperry. He was awarded the Newbery Medal for 1940 on June 20, 1941, in Cambridge, Massachusetts, by the Children's Library Section of the American Library Association. At his acceptance of the Medal, he said, "I had been afraid that perhaps in Call It Courage, the concept of spiritual courage might be too adult for children, but the reception of this book has reaffirmed a belief I have long held: that children have imagination enough to grasp any idea, and respond to it, if it is put to them honestly and without a patronizing pat on the head."

Sperry purchased a farm in Thetford Center, Vermont, in the late 1930s, and then moved to Hanover, New Hampshire, at the beginning of World War II. In 1944, he won the New York Herald Tribune Children's Spring Book Festival Award for Storm Canvas, a story of a boy on the U.S. frigate Thunderbolt in 1814, and in 1949, he won the Boys' Clubs of America Junior Book Award for the 1947 publication of The Rain Forest.

Although established as a writer, Sperry continued to illustrate dustjackets for other well-known authors of young adult fiction of his era, including Howard Pease, Agnes D. Hewes, Edgar Rice Burroughs, Florence C. Means, and Hildegarde Hawthorne, as well as illustrating various basal readers for the Ginn Co. In 1951, he illustrated an adaptation by Allen Chaffee of Longfellow's Story of Hiawatha.

In 1942, he published his only novel for adult readers, No Brighter Glory, about the Astor family.

== Titles in print ==
In addition to Call It Courage, which has been in print continuously since first published in 1940 and translated into dozens of languages, All Sail Set and Wagons Westward were reissued in 1986 and 2001 respectively by David R. Godine, and John Paul Jones, Fighting Sailor was reissued in 2006 as John Paul Jones, The Pirate Patriot by Sterling Point Books.

- Call It Courage ISBN 978-1-4169-5368-5
- All Sail Set ISBN 978-0-87923-523-9
- Wagons Westward ISBN 978-1-56792-128-1
- John Paul Jones, The Pirate Patriot ISBN 978-1-4027-3615-5
