= Daniel Boone (book) =

1939 book by James Daugherty

- Author: James Daugherty
- Language: English
- Subject: Children's, Historical Biography
- Genre: Non fiction
- Publisher: Viking Press
- Publication date: Jan 1939
- Publication place: United States
- Media type: Print (Hardback & Paperback)
- ISBN: 9780670255894

Daniel Boone is a book by James Daugherty about the famous pioneer and frontiersman. Daniel Boone was first published on 1939 by Viking Press. It won the Newbery Medal for excellence in American children's literature in 1940. It deals with the life, death, and legacy of Daniel Boone. The book is currently out of print, but scans can be found on the Internet.

== Plot and settings ==
Daniel Boone was an American frontiersman who is known for his explorations and settling of Kentucky. In the biography "Daniel Boone" by Daugherty, the author weaves together the most exciting moments of Boone's life into a captivating narrative. The book also provides information on the historical setting in which Boone lived, allowing readers to better understand his motivations and experiences.

The story begins in the 1740s when Boone is a young boy living in Berks County, Pennsylvania. As the area becomes more crowded, the Boone family decides to move to the Yadkin River Valley in North Carolina in 1751. However, they are forced to relocate to Culpeper, Virginia a few years later due to Native American raids. The Boones eventually return to the Yadkin River Valley, but eventually move on to Kentucky through the Cumberland Gap.

The book follows Boone as he goes on "long hunts" in Georgia, Florida, and Kentucky, and also details his involvement in various battles and expeditions. These include General William Braddock's campaign against the French and Native Americans, a campaign against the Cherokee in Tennessee, and Lord Dunsmore's expedition down the Ohio River. Boone is also instrumental in opening Kentucky to white settlers.

Later in life, Boone becomes a member of the Virginia legislature and is captured by the Shawnee. He spends his final years with his family on the banks of the Femme Osage Creek in Missouri, where he dies in September 1820.

== Work ==
- Daniel Boone, wilderness scout , New York: Viking Press: Junior Literary Guild, 1939.

Awards
Preceded by Thimble Summer	Newbery Medal recipient 1940	Succeeded by Call It Courage
