= The Matchlock Gun =

1941 children's book by Walter D. Edmonds

- First edition
- Author: Walter D. Edmonds
- Illustrator: Paul Lantz
- Language: English
- Genre: Children's, Historical novel
- Publisher: Dodd, Mead & Company
- Publication date: 1941
- Publication place: United States
- Media type: Print (hardback & paperback)
- ISBN: 0-698-11680-1

The Matchlock Gun is a children's book by Walter D. Edmonds. It won the Newbery Medal for excellence as the most distinguished contribution to American children's literature in 1942.

== Synopsis ==
The book is set in the year 1756 during the French and Indian War in Guilderland, New York. Ten-year-old Edward Van Alstyne (throughout the book, he is called "Ateoord", which is his name in Dutch) and his mother Gertrude are determined to protect their home and family with an ancient (and much too heavy) Spanish matchlock gun that Edward's great-grandfather had brought from Bergen Op Zoom in the Netherlands while his father Teunis is away from home with the local militia fighting the enemy (using, to Edward's disappointment, a musket instead of the matchlock).

Gertrude, Edward, and his younger sister Trudy go about their everyday chores, but news arrives that the French-Indian forces have been attacking and burning nearby settlements and that Teunis and his militia company have been sent to intercept them. Later that day, while she and the children are out herding the cows, Gertrude spots a column of smoke in the distance and realizes that raiders are getting closer. Rather than take herself and the children over to her mother-in-law's brick house as Teunis had previously suggested, since raiders would be more likely to attack it rather than their house, she devises a plan for a possible Indian attack. Returning home, she loads the matchlock gun, fixes it in position to fire and instructs Edward how and when to fire it. She then goes outside to keep a watch for any approaching raiders.

At the book's climax, Gertrude sees flames in the distance and realizes that her mother-in-law's house has indeed been attacked. Moments later, she spots five Indians approaching in the darkness, bent on burning the house. Barely able to outrun them, she reaches the front porch and manages to shout a pre-arranged warning to Edward, but is wounded in the shoulder by a thrown tomahawk, and the boy fires the gun through the front window, killing three raiders and driving off the remaining two (one of them, apparently wounded, is later killed by the returning militia). As their house burns, Edward and Trudy manage to drag their unconscious mother to safety. Edward goes back into the burning house to save the Spanish gun, and later he, Trudy and their mother are found by their father and the other militiamen.

The book's foreword states that this is a true story handed down from Trudy's descendants (Trudy became widely known as an expert spinner, having been taught by her mother who, because of her crippled shoulder, could no longer perform the task).

== Audio adaptations ==
The book has been recorded twice, first in 1969 as an audio dramatization by Newbery Awards Records, Inc. (NAR 3005) and again in 2015 by Blackstone Audio read by Mark Turetsky.

== Criticism ==
The book has been accused of depicting Native Americans as "horror, the ultimate nightmare [...which] may very well be one of the worst descriptions of Native people in children’s literature, certainly in the 20th century", and "eulogiz[ing] an American past in which the indigenous populations were regarded as sub-human, and every effort made to exterminate them."

Awards
| Preceded by Call It Courage | Newbery Medal recipient 1942 | Succeeded by Adam of the Road |
