= Then There Were Five =

1944 novel by Elizabeth Enright

- First edition cover with Enright artwork
- Author: Elizabeth Enright
- Illustrator: Enright
- Series: Melendy family
- Genre: Realistic children's fiction
- Publisher: Farrar & Rinehart
- Publication date: 1944
- Publication place: United States
- Media type: Print (hardcover)
- Pages: 241 pp.
- OCLC: 299613
- LC Class: PZ7.E724 Te
- Preceded by: The Four-Story Mistake
- Followed by: Spiderweb for Two

Then There Were Five is a children's novel written and illustrated by Elizabeth Enright, published by Farrar & Rineheart in 1944. It is the third of four books in the Melendy family series which Enright inaugurated in 1941. Continuing life at the "four-story mistake" country house during World War II, the four children have adventures that include a neighbor boy who finally joins the family.

== Plot introduction ==
The four Melendy children live with their father, a widowed professor of economics, and Cuffy, their beloved housekeeper, in an old house in the countryside of New York. Their Father has been hired by the government for a secret, World War II-related job, and the children venture into their new neighborhood with the intention of helping their country. They end up making new friends collecting scrap metal, and also brush up against some local scoundrels. The most notable of their new friends is Mark, a boy about Rush's age, who is under the care of his abusive adult cousin Oren Meeker. The Melendy children want to help Mark, but don't know how.

Meanwhile, there are adventures to be had: Rush composes his Opus 3, Miranda "Randy" and Mona try their hand at canning, and Oliver is entranced by the possibilities presented by fish and caterpillars. But when Cuffy, their housekeeper, goes away to visit a sick cousin in Ithaca, the unexpected occurs. A fire brings Mark to live at The Four-Story Mistake, where he becomes a permanent member of their family.

== Reception ==
Then There Were Five capitalizes on the country setting and young Oliver's fascination with nature. Charisse Gendron writes, "Enright expresses the wonder in nature and in children's feelings. This is most remarkable in the chapter 'Oliver's Other World' in which the child ... is visited one night by a Luna moth." She also praises the fact that the emotional effect of Oren Meeker's death on his young cousin is not ignored.

The addition of Mark, according to Irene Haas, "adds much to the family and the book." Kirkus Reviews says "There is a certain guilelessness about Elizabeth Enright's stories – but they leave you with a warm and pleasant glow." The Saturday Review of Literature also liked the addition of Mark and the way he proved his worth to the Melendys. "Mark's whole relationship to the Melendy family and their final acceptance of him show a fine sense of values ... As you finish this story you can almost hear the children say: 'That is a good book!'."
