= Gone-Away Lake =

1957 novel by Elizabeth Enright

- First edition cover with Krush artwork
- Author: Elizabeth Enright
- Illustrator: Beth and Joe Krush
- Cover artist: Krush
- Genre: Children's novel
- Publisher: Harcourt, Brace & Co.
- Publication date: 1957
- Publication place: United States
- Media type: Print (hardcover, paperback), audiobook
- Pages: 192 pp.
- OCLC: 42736382
- LC Class: PZ7.E724 Go
- Followed by: Return to Gone-Away

Gone-Away Lake is a children's novel written by Elizabeth Enright, illustrated by Beth and Joe Krush, and published by Harcourt in 1957. It was a runner-up for the annual Newbery Medal and was named to the Lewis Carroll Shelf Award list in 1970. It tells the story of cousins who spend a summer exploring and discover a lost lake and the two people who still live there.

Enright, the Krushes, and Harcourt produced a sequel published in 1961, Return to Gone-Away, in which the children's family buys a house near Gone-Away.

== Plot summary ==
Gone-Away Lake opens on a train traveling through the countryside of western New York state. Ten-year-old Portia Blake and her six-year-old brother Foster are going to see their favorite cousin, enthusiastic amateur naturalist Julian Jarman. The Jarmans have recently purchased a house in the country. Once there, Portia and Julian spend their days exploring, and one day they discover an abandoned Victorian resort community next to a bog. Elderly siblings Mr. Payton and Mrs. Cheever, the town's only remaining inhabitants, soon become friends with the children, who set up a club in one of the empty houses.

Stories of the days when the bog was a lake called Tarrigo are interspersed with the modern-day adventures of Portia and Julian, who at first keep the lake and their new friends a secret. Foster soon discovers the secret and eventually the rest of the Jarman and Blake families also become acquainted with the charms of Gone-Away and its inhabitants. In Return to Gone-Away, a sequel published in 1961, the Blake family buys and restores a house at Gone-Away.

== Reception ==
Gone-Away Lake was a runner-up for the Newbery Medal in 1958 (now called a Newbery Honor Book). It received the New York Herald Tribune's Children's Spring Book Festival Award in 1957. In 1963 the American Library Association named Gone-Away Lake as the U.S. nominee for the international Hans Christian Andersen Award. It was named to the Lewis Carroll Shelf Award list in 1970.

Reviewers then and now praise Enright's excellent characterization, her use of description, and strong presentation of setting and nature in Gone-Away Lake. A review by Irene Haas mentioned that "animals abound, and secrets and clubs, danger and daring". According to Saturday Review, Enright "knows how to create real children". Writer and reviewer Anita Silvey calls Gone-Away Lake "Enright's finest achievement" and praises "her descriptive powers and unique ability to observe the world through the eyes of a child". Children's book expert May Hill Arbuthnot also praised Enright's fine use of description and observed, "Good prose style for any age level surprises and delights."

In 2012 Gone-Away Lake was ranked number 42 among all-time best children's novels in a survey published by School Library Journal – the first of three books by Enright in the top 100.
