= Glory of the Seas =

1933 children's novel by Agnes Hewes

- Author: Agnes Hewes
- Illustrator: N.C. Wyeth
- Language: English
- Genre: Children's literature / Historical fiction
- Publication date: 1933
- Publication place: United States

Glory of the Seas is a 1933 children's historical fiction novel written by Agnes Hewes and illustrated by N.C. Wyeth. It is set in Boston, Massachusetts, during the 1850s. The book was a Newbery Honor book in 1934, Hewes' second after Spice and the Devil's Cave (1931).

== Plot summary ==
John Seagrave is a sailing enthusiast excited to hear about the Flying Cloud's journey from the East Coast to California around Cape Horn in 89 days. John lives with his uncle, a federal judge, in Boston. Soon after the Fugitive Slave Law of 1850 passes, his uncle resigns from his position rather than enforce the act. John learns his boss, Mr. Fay, is shipping slaves and plans to use the Grand Republic to import his largest shipment of slaves so far. After the ship is destroyed in a fire, John and his uncle decide to move to California.
