= Agnes Hewes =

American children's writer (1874–1963)

Agnes Danforth Hewes
- Born: Agnes Danforth; March 30, 1874 (Note: A collection compiled by her daughter gives date of birth March 30, 1874; a Davis family genealogy website gives March 30, 1872, and birthdate November 1, 1874, for her sister Helen Danforth.); Tripoli, Lebanon
- Died: September 30, 1963 (aged 89); San Francisco, California, USA
- Writing career
- Genre: Children's literature

Agnes Danforth Hewes (March 30, 1874 – September 30, 1963) was an American writer of children's literature, three times a runner-up for the annual Newbery Medal. Her early childhood overseas had a huge influence on her life and writing.

== Biography ==
Hewes was born in Tripoli, Lebanon to medical missionary parents working for the American Presbytery Board of Missions, Galen Bancroft Danforth and Emily Reynolds Calhoun Danforth. Galen had graduated from Amherst College in 1867 and then studied medicine in Germany and Edinburgh, eventually following in the footsteps of his father, who was also a medical doctor, receiving his medical degree from New York University in 1871. He began his mission work in 1871 and married Emily in Abeih, on Mount Lebanon, Lebanon, on December 25, 1871.

Hewes's father died of a fever and pneumonia on July 9, 1875—shortly after she was born—in Lebanon, and her mother died on January 12, 1881. Hewes was left in the care of a nurse and household servants. She stayed in the family home in Abeih with her maternal grandmother, Emily Pitkin Reynolds Calhoun, until she was 12 years old; she grew up speaking Arabic. Hewes's maternal grandfather was another missionary, Dr. (Rev.) Simeon Howard Calhoun. Calhoun died in Buffalo, New York, on December 13, 1876. Thus when Emily Pitkin Calhoun returned to Lebanon to care for her daughter and granddaughter, Hewes could not answer in English. Rev. Simeon and Emily Calhoun's other daughter, Susan Howard Calhoun (Hewes' aunt) married Rev. Charles Newton Ransom and they were also missionaries in Lebanon. These formative years in Lebanon greatly inspired Hewes's lifelong love of foreign lands and cultures:

My fairy godmother's priceless gift to me was to let me live my first twelve years in Syria. That, in a nutshell, is my feeling about Syria! That is why I wrote my first book, because I loved Syria so much—its magnificent brilliant scenery, its dear warm-hearted people, its customs come down from the Bible times, its beautiful dignified speech, its rich historical background—that I wanted American children to love it, to see it with my eyes. I felt as if no one could afford to miss knowing my Syria. I feel so still.

Hewes apparently graduated from Elmira College, in Elmira, New York. In 1901 she married Laurence Ilsley Hewes. They had several children between 1902 and 1916, including Mary, who wrote a book about her mother in 1967. Hewes wrote her first of many youth books in 1923, several of which dealt with culture clashes and early international trade. Following in her family tradition, Hewes became a minister at some point prior to November 1928, which was unusual for women in Protestantism at that time. She eventually settled in San Francisco, California, and died there on September 30, 1963.

== Selected works ==
- A Boy of the Lost Crusade (1923)
- Swords on the Sea (1928)
- Spice and the Devil's Cave (1930) (NH 1931)
- Glory of the Seas (1933) (NH 1934)
- The Codfish Musket (1936) (NH 1937)
- The Sword of Roland Arnot (1939)
- Jackhammer; Drill Runners of the Mountain Highways (1942)
- Two Oceans to Canton, the Story of the Old China Trade (1944)
- Spice Ho! A Story of Discovery (1947)
- A Hundred Bridges To Go (1950)

NH: Three children's books by Hewes were among the annual Newbery Medal runners-up, now called Newbery Honor Books.

== See also ==
- Ordination of women
- Ordination of women in Protestant churches
