= Bert Breen's Barn =

1975 children's historical novel by Walter D. Edmonds

- First edition
- Author: Walter D. Edmonds
- Illustrator: Eric Sloane
- Language: English
- Genre: Children's novel
- Publisher: Little, Brown and Company
- Publication date: 1975
- LC Class: PZ7.E247 Be 1991 (later edition)

Bert Breen's Barn is a children's historical novel set in the early 1900s, written by Walter D. Edmonds and first published by Little Brown in 1975. The main character is Tom Dolan, an impoverished young man who lives in the north Adirondack country. The plot concerns Tom's fascination with Bert Breen's Barn, as well as the fortune that he believes to be buried beneath it.

The book won the 1976 National Book Award in category Children's Books.
