= The Saturdays (novel) =

1941 novel by Elizabeth Enright

- First edition dustjacket with Enright artwork
- Author: Elizabeth Enright
- Illustrator: Enright
- Series: Melendy family
- Genre: Realistic children's fiction
- Publisher: Farrar & Rinehart
- Publication date: 1941
- Publication place: United States
- Media type: Print (hardcover)
- Pages: 175 pp.
- OCLC: 172840
- LC Class: PZ7.E724 Sat
- Followed by: The Four-Story Mistake

The Saturdays is a children's novel written and illustrated by Elizabeth Enright, published by Farrar & Rinehart in 1941. It is the first of four books in the Melendy family series, introducing the four Melendy children who determine to stop wasting their Saturdays, pool their allowances, and take turns having adventures in pre-World War II New York City.

In 2012 The Saturdays was ranked number 75 among all-time best children's novels in a survey published by School Library Journal – the second of three books by Enright in the top 100.

== Plot ==
The four Melendy children live with their father, a widowed professor of economics, and Cuffy, their beloved housekeeper, in a brownstone in New York City. There's thirteen-year-old Mona, who has her heart set on becoming an actress; twelve-year-old mischievous Rush, who plays the piano; ten-year-old Miranda "Randy" who loves to dance and paint; and thoughtful Oliver, who is six.

Tired of wasting Saturdays doing nothing but wishing for allowances, the four Melendys jump at Randy's idea to start the Independent Saturday Afternoon Adventure Club (I.S.A.A.C.). If they pool their resources and take turns spending the whole amount, they can each have at least one memorable Saturday afternoon of their own. Before long, I.S.A.A.C. is in operation and every Saturday is definitely one to remember. Each Melendy child is able to do exactly what he or she pleases, discovering new ideas along the way. Randy becomes friends with an old lady who was once kidnapped by gypsies, Rush brings home a stray dog, and Mona shocks her family by taking her first step toward adulthood. But when Oliver wants to be out on his own, too, the rest of the family has second thoughts.

In an incident involving a coal gas leak, the Paul Muni film The Life of Emile Zola is referenced.

== Reception ==
Kirkus gave The Saturdays a starred review for "books of remarkable merit", calling it "[a] delightful family story, built around an original pattern." May Hill Arbuthnot also liked the unusual structure of the book, pointing out that "[t]heir adventures in New York City are characteristic of each child". She also calls them "often startling and always amusing".

Concerning the four Melendy children, the Dictionary of Literary Biography cites Enright's ability to "include the interactions and various viewpoints of a fully developed group of characters". Reviewer Irene Haas agrees, calling the Melendy children "satisfying characters".
