= The Farmer Takes a Wife (1935 film) =

1935 film by Victor Fleming

- Theatrical release poster
- Directed by: Victor Fleming
- Screenplay by: Edwin J. Burke; Marc Connelly; Frank B. Elser
- Based on: The Farmer Takes a Wife by Marc Connelly and Frank B. Elser
- Produced by: Winfield R. Sheehan
- Starring: Janet Gaynor; Henry Fonda; Charles Bickford; Slim Summerville; Andy Devine; Roger Imhof; Jane Withers; Margaret Hamilton
- Cinematography: Ernest Palmer
- Edited by: Harold D. Schuster
- Music by: Cyril J. Mockridge
- Production company: Fox Film Corporation
- Distributed by: 20th Century-Fox
- Release date: August 2, 1935
- Running time: 91 minutes
- Country: United States
- Language: English

The Farmer Takes a Wife is a 1935 American romantic comedy film directed by Victor Fleming, written by Edwin J. Burke, and starring Janet Gaynor, Henry Fonda (in his screen debut) and Charles Bickford. It is based on the 1934 Broadway play of the same name by Marc Connelly and Frank B. Elser, with Fonda reprising his stage role as the farmer. The film was released on August 2, 1935, by 20th Century-Fox.

== Plot ==
Dan Harrow goes to work as a driver for Samson Weaver on the Erie Canal, but his heart is set on buying a farm and settling down, even though his father was a canal man. This ambition and his distaste for fighting puzzle Molly Larkins, the girlfriend and cook of Jotham Klore, but she develops a liking for him anyway.

When Samson wins $5,000 in a lottery, he gives Dan a half share of his boat. This prompts Dan to propose to Molly, but she wants to stay on the Erie Canal, not live on a farm, so she will only go work for him, much to Jotham's displeasure. Jotham arrives at a big fair at the same time as Molly and Dan. Samson warns Dan, so he asks Molly to leave for Utica. Molly is ashamed of him, thinking he is a coward, but he confesses that he is going to Utica to finalize the purchase of a farm. Molly is so disgusted by this news that she quarrels with him. He departs for his new farm, leaving his share of the boat to Molly and warning her that the Erie Canal's days of prosperity are numbered, as the railroads move in.

Molly is miserable, but refuses to admit it. She tells her friend Fortune Friendly that she might have gotten used to the idea of being a farmer's wife, but she could never marry a coward. Fortune decides to take matters into his own hands. He goes to see Dan. He lies and tells Dan that Molly is being shunned and insulted for having worked for a coward. Dan decides to have it out with Jotham. Molly then tries to prevent the fight, but without success. When Dan manages to beat Jotham, Molly tells him he is the new champion of the Canal and that he should stay, but he finally gives up on her. He tells that he no longer wants her and heads home. However, she follows him to his place, and he embraces her.

== Cast ==
- Janet Gaynor as Molly Larkins
- Henry Fonda as Dan Harrow
- Charles Bickford as Jotham Klore
- Slim Summerville as Fortune Friendly
- Andy Devine as Elmer Otway
- Roger Imhof as Samson 'Sam' Weaver
- Jane Withers as Della
- Margaret Hamilton as Lucy Gurget
- Sig Ruman as Blacksmith
- John Qualen as Sol Tinker
- Kitty Kelly as Ivy
- Robert Gleckler as Fisher
- Erville Alderson as Wagon Father (uncredited)
- Philip Cooper as John Wilkes Booth (uncredited)
- George 'Gabby' Hayes as Lucas (uncredited)
- J.M. Kerrigan as Angus (uncredited)
- Mitchell Lewis as Boatman in Office (uncredited)
- Robert Warwick as Junius Brutus Booth (uncredited)

== Reception ==
Andre Sennwald, critic for The New York Times, called The Farmer Takes a Wife "a rich and leisurely comedy of American manners" and singled out the performances of Fonda and Bickford for praise. However, while he wrote that Summerville and Gaynor gave "pleasant performances", he felt that "Miss Gaynor is really too nice a person to be playing bad girls like Molly Larkins."
