= Spiderweb for Two: A Melendy Maze =

1951 novel by Elizabeth Enright

- First edition dustjacket with Enright artwork
- Author: Elizabeth Enright
- Illustrator: Enright
- Series: Melendy family
- Genre: Children's mystery fiction
- Publisher: Rinehart & Company
- Publication date: 1951
- Publication place: United States
- Media type: Print (hardcover)
- Pages: 209 pp.
- OCLC: 8989834
- LC Class: PZ7.E724 Sp
- Preceded by: Then There Were Five

Spiderweb for Two: A Melendy Maze is a children's novel written and illustrated by Elizabeth Enright and published by Rinehart in 1951. It is the last of four books in the Melendy family series which she inaugurated in 1941. It tells the story of the two youngest among five children after they alone remain at the family's "four-story mistake" house in the country.

The first three novels, published from 1941 to 1944, had been reissued by Rinehart in a 1947 omnibus edition entitled The Melendy Family.

== Plot ==
"Randy was certain this was going to be the worst winter of her life." Miranda "Randy" Melendy and her younger brother Oliver find themselves the only children in their family for the first time in their lives. Rush and Mark have gone away to a boarding school, and Mona now lives in New York City with the family's elderly friend, Mrs. Oliphant. Randy hates change of any sort, and even placid Oliver has a hard time dealing with being left behind. Then a mysterious note arrives in the mail, inviting the children to solve a rhyming clue. Each note leads to another one, with the promise of a treasure at the end.

Randy and Oliver find themselves exploring the countryside, their community, and even discovering family history as they race through a maze of guesses and misdirection. The final chapter reveals the authors of the clues to be their family and Mrs. Oliphant, and Randy and Oliver are treated to the "rare reward" they were promised at the start of the game, with everyone together again for the summer.

== Reception ==
After three books about all the Melendy children, some reviewers found they missed the lively personalities of the now absent older siblings as much as Randy and Oliver do in the book. Anita Silvey wrote, "The last book in the series ... disappoints only because the older Melendy children have left home, though the writing has the usual Enright charm and percipience."

As the Dictionary of Literary Biography points out, all of the Melendy books "capture the world of the 1940s, where holidays were major family events and children invented their own games". This can be seen in Spiderweb for Two where young Randy and Oliver wander freely around the countryside without any supervision. "All Enright children do things that children dream of doing", according to Irene Haas.
