= Thimble Summer =

1938 book by Elizabeth Enright

- Author: Elizabeth Enright
- Illustrator: Elizabeth Enright
- Language: English
- Genre: Children's novel
- Publisher: Farrar & Rinehart
- Publication date: August 18, 1938
- Publication place: United States
- Media type: Print (Hardback & Paperback)
- ISBN: 9780440486817

Thimble Summer is a 1938 novel by American author Elizabeth Enright, set in Depression-era rural Wisconsin. It won the 1939 Newbery Medal.

The very evening that nine-year-old Garnet Linden finds a silver thimble in a dried-up riverbed near the farm where she lives, the drought that has threatened her family's financial future is broken with a rainstorm. The days that follow are filled with exciting events: the Lindens come by money to rebuild their barn, Garnet's pig wins a blue ribbon at the fair, and a young boy named Eric comes to live with the Lindens as their adopted son.

When the time comes for the show, Garnet is stuck on the Ferris wheel. She can't get down for almost another hour, and the show starts in thirty minutes.

The summer is so wonderful that Garnet comes to believe that the thimble had magical powers, and she vows to remember that time as her "thimble summer."

In another chapter, "Locked In," Garnet and her friend, Citronella, stay too long at the library and are locked in for the night.

Awards
| Preceded by The White Stag | Newbery Medal recipient 1939 | Succeeded by Daniel Boone |
