= The Farmer Takes a Wife =

1934 play by Frank B. Elser and Marc Connelly

A Farmer Takes a Wife
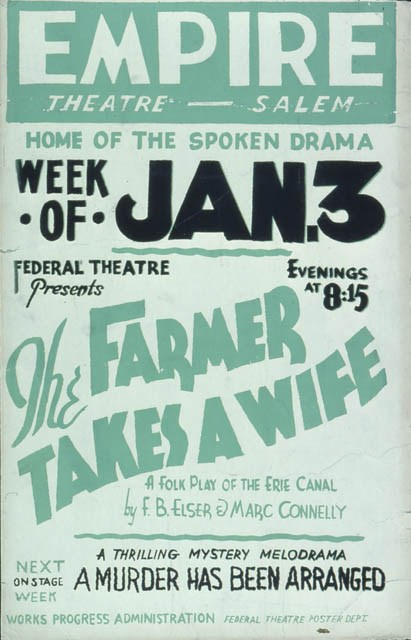
- Poster from the Federal Theatre Project, Work Projects Administration, production 1938
- Original language: English
- Based on: Rome Haul by Walter D. Edmonds
- Characters: Dan Harrrow; Molly Larkins
- Setting: Erie Canal

Premiere
- Date: October 30, 1934
- Place: 46th Street Theatre
- Directed by: Marc Connelly

Henry Fonda and Janet Gaynor

The Farmer Takes a Wife is a 1934 play by Frank B. Elser and Marc Connelly based on the 1929 novel Rome Haul by Walter D. Edmonds. It was well-received upon its opening night on Broadway on October 30, 1934, at the 46th Street Theatre. The production was directed by Marc Connelly, used set designs by Donald Oenslager, and starred Henry Fonda as Dan Harrow and June Walker as Molly Larkins. It ran for 104 performances, closing on January 16, 1935.

== Film adaptations ==
The play spawned two film adaptations. The first, a 1935 comedy film, was directed by Victor Fleming, starred Janet Gaynor, and marked the Hollywood debut of Henry Fonda. Dan Harrow (Henry Fonda) works along the Erie Canal during the mid-19th century to raise money to buy a farm. While working, he meets Molly Larkins, a beautiful canal boat cook (Janet Gaynor). Although Harrow wants to marry Larkins, she's apprehensive about leaving the exciting canal life for one of a farmer's wife.

A 1953 musical remake used a score by Harold Arlen and Cyril J. Mockridge. The picture was directed by Henry Levin and starred Betty Grable, Dale Robertson, Eddie Foy, Jr., and Thelma Ritter.

== Radio adaptation ==
The Farmer Takes a Wife was presented as the season premiere of Radio Reader's Digest on CBS on September 12, 1946. Olivia de Havilland starred in the episode, with the adaptation by Robert Cenedella.
