= The Four-Story Mistake =

1942 novel by Elizabeth Enright

- First edition cover with Enright artwork
- Author: Elizabeth Enright
- Illustrator: Enright
- Genre: Realistic children's fiction
- Publisher: Farrar & Rinehart
- Publication date: 1942
- Publication place: United States
- Media type: Print (hardcover)
- Pages: 177 pp.
- OCLC: 2023039
- LC Class: PZ7.E724 Fo
- Preceded by: The Saturdays
- Followed by: Then There Were Five

The Four-Story Mistake is a children's novel written and illustrated by Elizabeth Enright, published by Farrar & Rinehart in 1942. It is the second book in the Melendy family series which Enright inaugurated in 1941. The family leaves World War II-era New York City for a house in the country, a house that is an adventure in itself.

In 2012 The Four-Story Mistake was ranked number 80 among all-time best children's novels in a survey published by School Library Journal – the third of three books by Enright in the top 100.

== Plot ==
The four Melendy children live with their father, a widowed professor of economics, and Cuffy, their beloved housekeeper. During the height of World War II, the Melendy family moves out of New York City and into the countryside. Miranda "Randy", the third child, dislikes change and is saddened by the move. But the house they move into turns out to be an adventure. Called by locals "The Four-Story Mistake", it is an odd-looking house with a rich architectural history, surrounded by the country.

The four Melendy children soon find adventure discovering the many hidden attractions of the house. Oliver discovers buried history, Rush is stranded in a tree during a storm, Randy finds a diamond in the most unlikely of places, and Mona learns what it truly means to be an actress. None of them could have guessed at the secret hidden in their very own play space, the office—a secret that had been shut away for over 60 years.

== Reception ==
The Saturday Review of Literature called The Four-Story Mistake "special because of its uncontrived, carefree humor and its modern appeal to everyone". Kirkus Reviews gave it a starred review for "books of remarkable merit" and praised it for "[p]lenty of action and incident; good dialogue; and a feel for people and the things they think and do".
