= Superga (brand) =

Italian shoe brand

- Type: Subsidiary
- Industry: Sportswear
- Founded: 1911
- Headquarters: Turin, Italy
- Products: Shoes
- Parent: BasicNet
- Website: superga.com

Superga is an Italian brand of shoes founded in 1911. It originally made tennis shoes, including the famous model "2750 Classic", but then diversified.

== History ==
Superga was born in 1911 in Turin, Italy, when Walter Martiny started production of rubber-soled footwear marked with the Superga logo. In 1925 Superga invented the 2750 model, shoes with vulcanized rubber soles. From 1934, the firm diversified its production to new collections dedicated to other sports and daily life.

After World War II, Superga restarted production specializing solely in high quality footwear. In 1951 the firm merged with Pirelli, which brought it new funds and made it possible to sharply increase the production of tennis shoes.

In the 1970s, as the sales of the 2750 continued, Superga diversified to add sport shoes with technical attributes. In the 1980s, the firm launched the production of clothes.

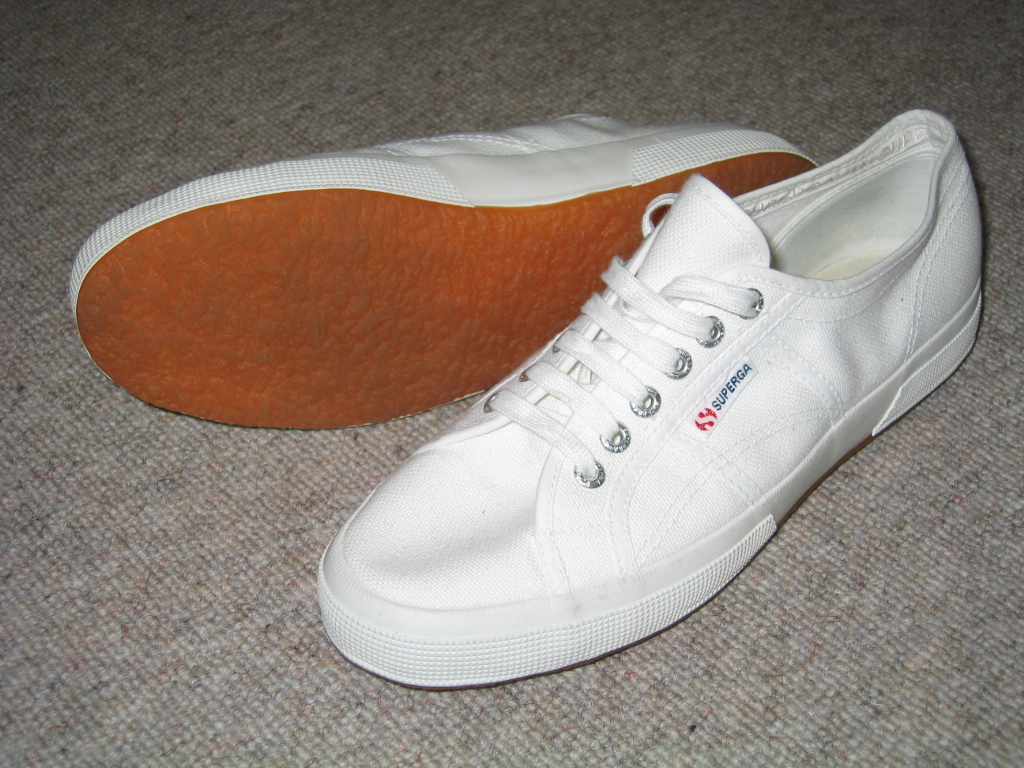
The original white Superga model

Superga UK employs popular celebrities as their brand ambassadors, with whom they collaborate to create a collection of shoes designed by the ambassador each year, including Alexa Chung in 2012, Rita Ora in 2013, and Suki Waterhouse in 2014. Supermodel Binx Walton was announced as brand ambassador for 2015, followed by Abbey Lee Kershaw for 2016. 2017 sees supermodel and bass guitarist Pyper America Smith, sister of male supermodel Lucky Blue, as the brand ambassador.

As of 2011, Steve Madden corporation acquired the license to sell, market, and distribute Superga products in North America. Shortly thereafter, he engaged Mary-Kate Olsen and Ashley Olsen to join the brand as creative directors for Superga in the US. In 2012 the women launched a collection of Superga shoes as a collaboration with their luxe ready-to-wear line, The Row, in conjunction with the opening of a Superga Store in New York City.

== Styles ==
Superga now offers a wide range of colors, fabrics, and prints each season for women, men, and kids. Apart from the original Superga Vulcanized and Sport lines or "2750 Cotu Classic", the collections include Superga City leather and Superga Country rubber rain and outerwear boots. Superga’s Cotu Classics gained additional popularity after being worn by Catherine, Princess of Wales.

== Stores ==
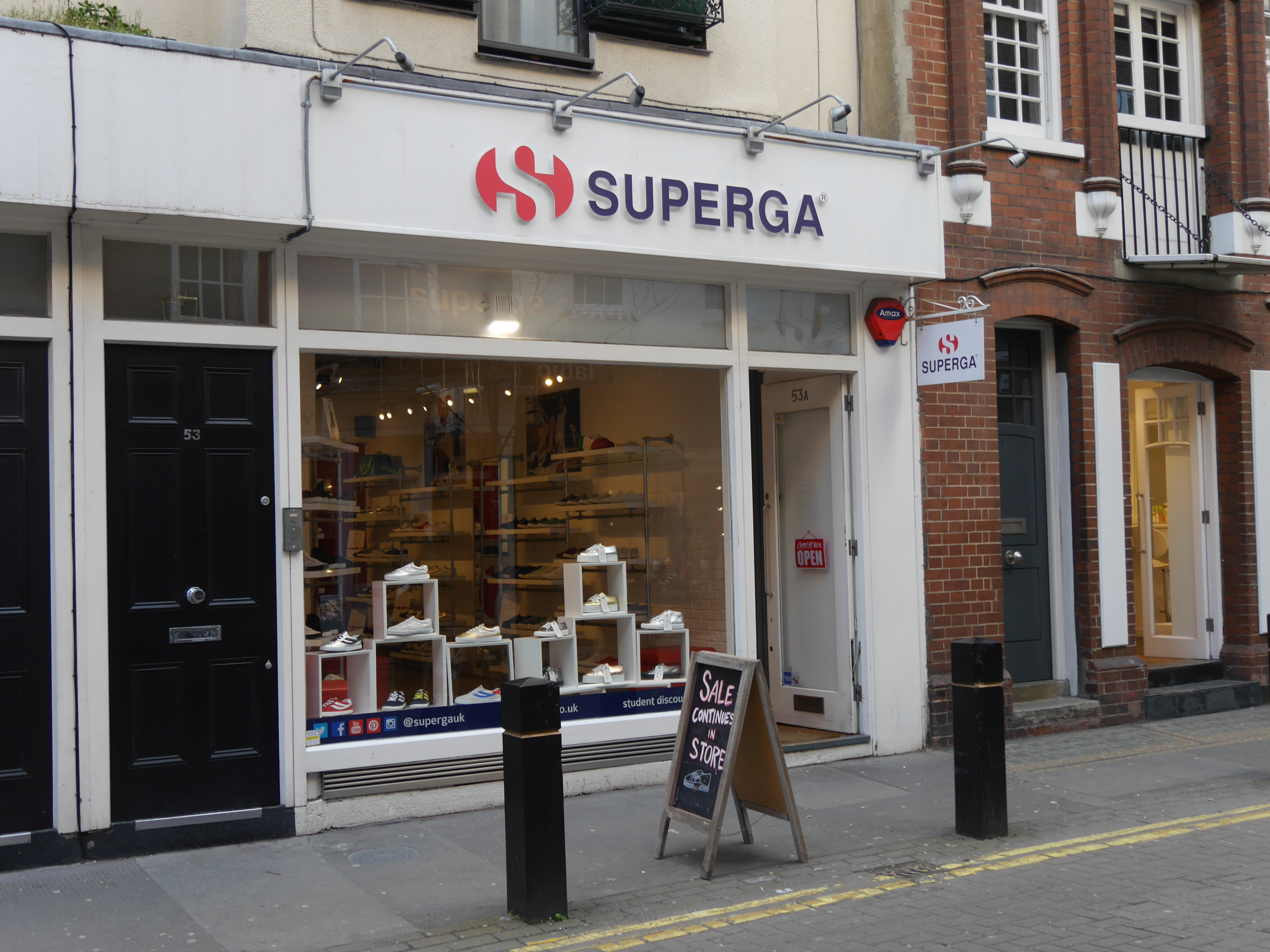
Superga store, Neal Street, Covent Garden, London

Superga has stores in the United States, Europe, South America, Asia and South Africa, and online stores along with direct selling on www.Superga.co.uk, www.Superga.com, and www.Superga-USA.com. Superga opened its first store in the United Kingdom in Covent Garden in June 2011. Followed by its first US store in the Soho neighborhood of NYC in May 2012 and in 2015 the first store of South America in Chile. Superga wholesales through premium department stores and specialty retailers in other countries.

== In the media ==
In the 2019 film Knives Out, the character Marta Cabrera (portrayed by Ana de Armas) wears a pair of Superga 2750 shoes.

In HBO Max's The Pitt, Dr. Cassie McKay (portrayed by Fiona Dourif) wears Superga 2750 shoes in black, with white laces.

== See also ==
Excludes articles found in Category:Sporting goods manufacturers of Italy.

- Sergio Tacchini
