= Walter D. Edmonds =

American writer (1903–1998)

Walter Dumaux Edmonds
- Born: July 15, 1903; Boonville, New York
- Died: January 24, 1998 (aged 94); Concord, Massachusetts
- Education: Harvard University
- Known for: writing

Walter "Wat" Dumaux Edmonds (July 15, 1903 – January 24, 1998) was an American writer best known for historical novels. One of them, Drums Along the Mohawk (1936), was adapted as a Technicolor feature film in 1939, directed by John Ford and starring Henry Fonda and Claudette Colbert.

== Life ==
Edmonds was born in Boonville, New York. In 1919 he entered The Choate School (now Choate Rosemary Hall) in Wallingford, Connecticut. Originally intending to study chemical engineering, he became more interested in writing and worked as managing editor of the Choate ‘’Literary Magazine‘’. He graduated in 1926 from Harvard, where he edited ‘’The Harvard Advocate‘’, and where he studied with Charles Townsend Copeland. He married Eleanor Stetson in 1930.

In 1929, he published his first novel, ‘’Rome Haul‘’, a work about the Erie Canal. The novel was adapted for the 1934 play ‘’The Farmer Takes a Wife‘’ and the 1935 film of the same name.

‘’Drums Along the Mohawk‘’ was on the bestseller list for two years, second only to Margaret Mitchell‘s famous 1936 novel ‘’Gone with the Wind‘’ for part of that time. Edmonds justifies his approach to historical accuracy in the preface:

A novelist has, if he chooses, a greater opportunity for the faithful presentation of a bygone time than an historian; for the historian is compelled to a presentation of cause and effect, and feels, as a rule, that he must present them through the lives and characters of ‘famous’ or ‘historical’ figures. My concern, however, has been with life as it was, as you or I, our mothers or wives, our brothers and husbands and uncles might have experienced it.

Edmonds eventually published 34 books, many for children, as well as a number of magazine stories. He won the Lewis Carroll Shelf Award in 1960 and the Newbery Medal in 1942, for ‘’The Matchlock Gun‘’, and the National Book Award for Young People's Literature in 1976, for ‘’Bert Breen's Barn‘’.

His 1953 novel The Boyds of Black River was turned into a 1979 television movie. It was retitled “Born to Run” and aired on The Wonderful World of Disney.

When Eleanor died in 1956, Walter married Katherine Howe Baker Carr, who died in 1989. Walter Edmonds died in Concord, Massachusetts, in 1998.

== Work ==
=== Novels ===
- Rome Haul (1929) *
- The Big Barn (1930)
- Erie Water (1933)
- Drums Along the Mohawk (1936) *
- Chad Hanna (1940) *
- Young Ames (1942) *
- The Wedding Journey (1947)
- The Boyds of Black River (1953)
- Wolf Hunt (1970)

=== Juvenile novels ===
- The Matchlock Gun (1941)
- Tom Whipple (1942)
- Two Logs Crossing: John Haskell's Story (1943)
- Cadmus Henry (1949)
- Time to Go House (1969)
- Bert Breen's Barn (1975)

=== Autobiographical novel ===
- The South African Quirt (1985)

=== Short story collections ===
- Mostly Canallers (1934) *
- In the Hands of the Senecas (1947)
- Seven American Stories (1970)
- The Night Raider and Other Stories (1980)

=== Non-fiction ===
- They Fought with What They Had: The Story of the Army Air Forces in the Southwest Pacific, 1941-1942 (1951)
- The Musket and the Cross: The Struggle of France and England for North America (1968)
- Tales My Father Never Told (1995)

* Novels Rome Haul, Drums Along the Mohawk, Chad Hanna, Young Ames and the short story collection Mostly Canallers were published as Armed Services Editions during WWII.
