= The Athlete's Foot =

American clothing store chain

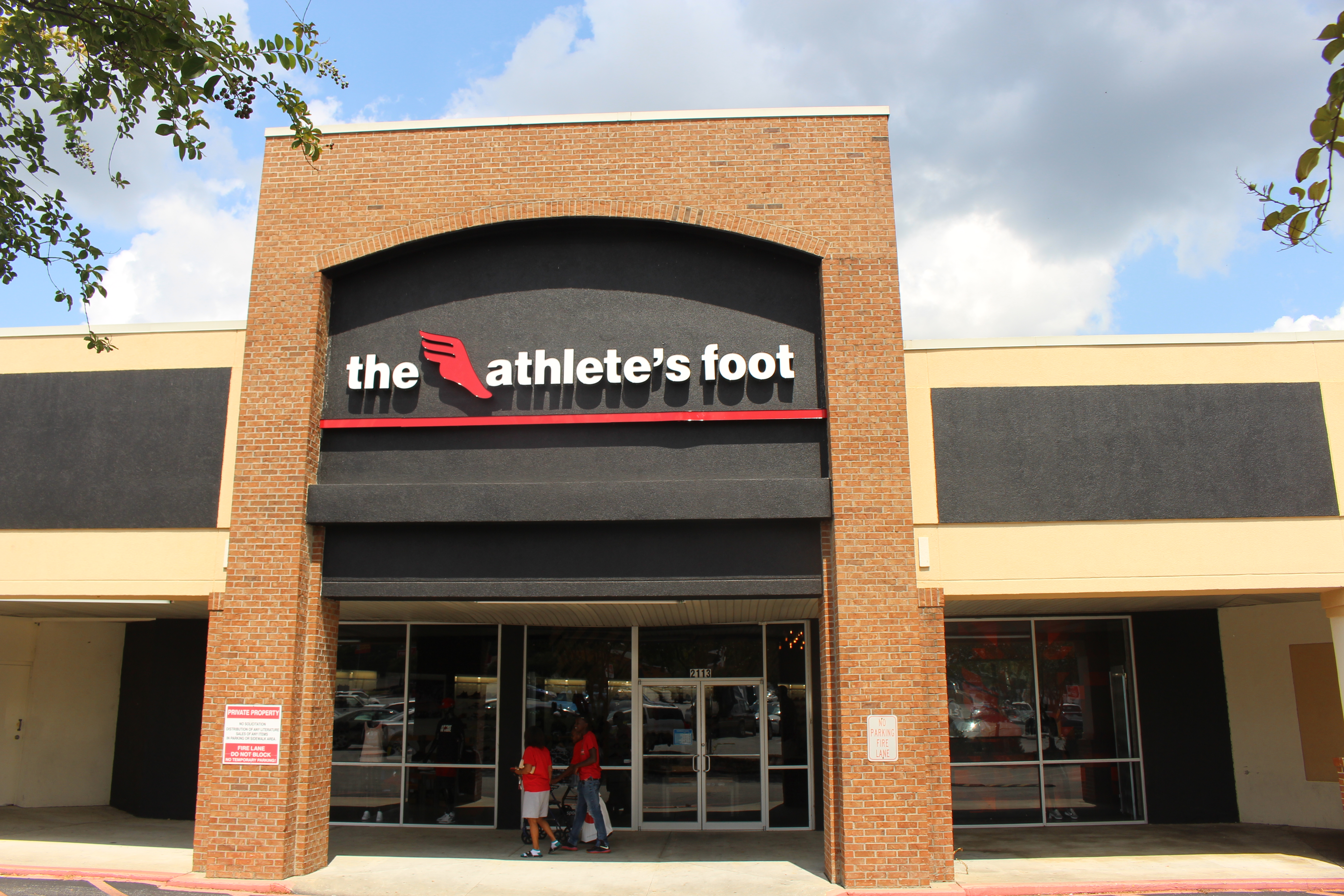
- The Athlete's Foot store in Valdosta, Georgia
- Type: Subsidiary
- Industry: Retail Franchising
- Founded: 1971
- Headquarters: Stans, Switzerland, Atlanta, Georgia
- Products: Footwear, clothing, accessories
- Parent: Arklyz Group
- Website: www.theathletesfoot.com

The Athlete's Foot (TAF) is a global retailer of athletic-inspired lifestyle and streetwear, including footwear, apparel and accessories. Its global headquarters are located in Stans, Switzerland, and its US headquarters are in Atlanta, Georgia.

== History ==
In 1971, David Lando realized that athletic shoes were by far the highest selling product in his store. That year, he and his son, Michael Lando, opened the first The Athlete's Foot store in Pittsburgh, Pennsylvania. It was the first athletic footwear specialty store of its kind in the United States. Soon thereafter, The Athlete's Foot began expanding in the United States. Among Lando's partners were his brother Robert and Sidney Gilbert of Rochester, New York. The first international franchise store opened in 1976 in Adelaide, Australia, the beginning of The Athlete's Foot expansion across the world.

In 2004, The Athlete's Foot filed for Chapter 11 bankruptcy protection, and announced that they would close all of their 124 company-owned stores in the United States, leaving the brand with 593 independent franchise locations left.

In 2012, the brand was acquired by Intersport International Corporation (IIC), the world's largest sporting goods retail group, headquartered in Bern, Switzerland. In 2021, Intersport sold The Athlete's Foot business to the Arklyz Group.

As of 2025, The Athlete's Foot is present in 20 countries across the world with over 250 stores, from United States and Australia, to Europe, Asia, Middle East and Latin America.

Strategic brand partners of The Athlete's Foot include Nike, Adidas, Reebok, Asics, New Balance, Converse, Puma SE and Vans.

== Stores ==
Africa

- Algeria: 10
- Reunion: 1

Asia and Middle East

- Australia: 128
- Philippines: 21
- Indonesia: 18
- New Zealand: 12
- Kuwait: 9
- United Arab Emirates: 3
- Northern Mariana Islands: 2
- Palau: 1
- Qatar: 1
- Turkey: 3

Europe

- Netherlands: 57
- France: 15
- Greece: 14
- Italy: 9
- Croatia: 8
- Serbia: 7
- Denmark: 6
- Finland: 6
- Ireland: 3
- Slovenia: 3
- Ukraine: 2
- Belgium: 1
- Faroe Islands: 1
- North Macedonia: 1
- Bosnia and Herzegovina: 1

Americas

- Mexico: 125
- United States: 44
- Ecuador: 8
- Peru: 6
- Bahamas: 2
- Aruba: 2
- Curacao: 1
