= Sebago (company) =

American shoe company

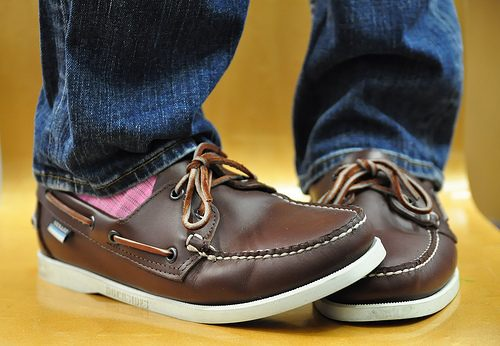
- Type: Subsidiary
- Industry: Sportswear; Sports equipment
- Founded: 1946
- Founder: Daniel J. Wellehan, Sr. William Beaudoin; Joseph Cordeau
- Headquarters: Rockford, Michigan, United States
- Area served: Worldwide
- Products: Boating shoes Apparel
- Parent: BasicNet
- Website: Sebago.co.uk

Sebago is an American Maine-based company creating boating and deck shoes, as well as dress shoes. Sebago was founded in 1946. In 2017, Italian holding company BasicNet acquired Sebago from Wolverine World Wide.

During the 1980s, the Sebago "Docksides" become a fashion trend at universities and high schools across the United States, as it was mentioned in The Official Preppy Handbook. In 1981, Sebago "Campsides" (a type of blucher moccasin, which, like docksiders, are traditionally worn without socks) were introduced. Three years later in 1984, Sebago sponsored the Single-Handed Trans-Atlantic Race in 1984 and the America's Cup in 1992.

Sebago also offers penny loafers in casual and dress styles; the Classic Dan style is the most popular.
