= Nicholas Gillham =

American geneticist (1932–2018)

- Born: Nicholas Wright Gillham; May 14, 1932; New York City, US
- Died: March 19, 2018 (aged 85); Fearrington Village, North Carolina, US
- Education: Harvard University
- Spouse: Carol Collins (m. 1956–2018)
- Awards: Guggenheim Fellowship (1984)
- Scientific career
- Fields: Genetics
- Workplaces: Duke University
- Thesis: Spontaneous and induced mutations to streptomycin resistance in Chlamydomonas Reinhardi (1962)

Nicholas Wright Gillham (May 14, 1932 – March 19, 2018) was an American geneticist who served as the James B. Duke Professor of Biology at Duke University. In addition to his scientific research, he is known for his 2001 biography of Francis Galton, A Life of Sir Francis Galton: From African Exploration to the Birth of Eugenics.

== Early life and education ==
Gillham was born on May 14, 1932, in New York City, New York. His father, Robert Marty Gillham, was an advertising executive, and his mother, Elizabeth Enright, was a writer of children's books and the niece of the architect Frank Lloyd Wright. He received his Ph.D. from Harvard University in 1962, and completed his postdoc at Yale University from 1961 to 1963.

== Academic career ==
After serving as an instructor and later as assistant professor at Harvard, Gillham joined the faculty of Duke University in 1968, where he was named James B. Duke Professor in 1982. He served as chair of the Department of Zoology at Duke from 1986 to 1989. He would remain on the faculty at Duke until his retirement in 2002. He was a member of the President's Biomedical Research Panel in 1975 and a member of the National Institute of Health's study section in genetics from 1976 to 1980, as well as a senior editor of the journal Plasmid from 1977 to 1986.

== Books ==
Gillham wrote three technical books during his career: one about microbiology and two about the genetics of organelles. In 2001, he published the book A Life of Sir Francis Galton: From African Exploration to the Birth of Eugenics, a biography of Francis Galton. A review of this book in Publishers Weekly stated that "[t]his may well prove to be the definitive biography" of Galton. Similarly, Theodore M. Porter reviewed the book favorably, describing it in the journal Isis as "a sound, readable account that will become, for most, the Galton biography of choice."

== Honors and awards ==
Gillham received a Research Career Development Award from 1972 to 1977 and a Guggenheim Fellowship in 1984. He was also a member of the Genetics Society of America.

== Personal life and death ==
Gillham married Carol Lenore Collins on June 2, 1956. They remained married until Gillham's death. Gillham died of a heart attack at his home in Fearrington Village, North Carolina, on March 19, 2018.
