= Stamford Yacht Club =

Sailing club in Stamford, Connecticut

- Stamford Yacht Club Burgee
- Formation: 1890
- Legal status: active
- Purpose: advocate and public voice, educator and network for Recreational boating, and competitive sailors, coaches, volunteers and events
- Location: Stamford, Connecticut
- Official language: English
- Website: stamfordyc.com

The Stamford Yacht Club is located in Stamford, Connecticut. The club is located on Stamford Harbor, and has approximately 550 members. The current commodore is Claudia P. Recker. The yacht club hosts a number of significant sailboat races during the season, including the Vineyard Race, held every Labor Day weekend, and the Valeur-Jensen Stamford Denmark Race, held in the fall.

== History ==
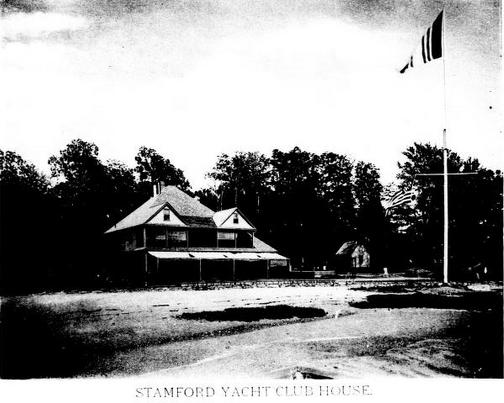
Stamford Yacht Club House c 1894

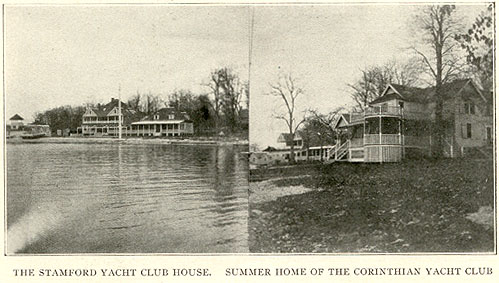
Pictures taken in Shippan for The Guide to Nature Magazine, June 1910 issue

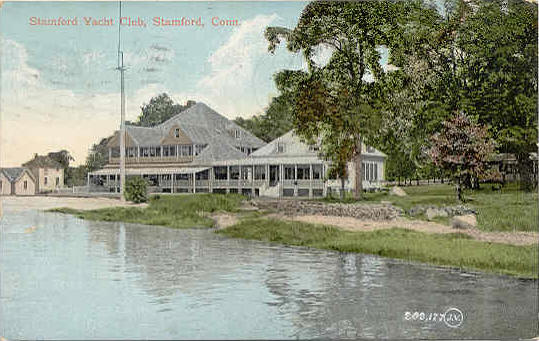
Stamford Yacht Club Postcard c 1913

The club was founded on October 16, 1890, at the home of William Lottimer.

The first race sailed at the club took place in August 1893. According to Yachts and Yachtsman of America, the race was open to sloops and cutters, 36 to 43 feet long. The course was from Cow's Buoy, off Shippan Point, to Matinnecock Point, then to Eaton's Neck and back, for a total of 25 miles. Kathleen, sailed by P.M. Hoyt of Stamford, was the winner.

Members of the club have won many prestigious yacht races, including the America's Cup, Fastnet Race, the Bermuda Race, the Great China Sea Race, the Ocean Race, and the SORC.

In 1990 as part of the club's centennial celebrations, the Centennial Book Editorial Committee of the Stamford Yacht Club wrote "One hundred years : on sound and shore of Stamford Yacht Club, 1890-1990."
