= Vineyard Race =

- Date: Starts annually on Friday of Labor Day Weekend
- Location: Stamford, CT
- Event type: Ocean Racing
- Distance: 238 nautical miles
- Primary sponsor: Stamford Yacht Club
- Established: 1932, 94 years ago
- Course records: 15 hours 54 minutes (2020)
- Website: Race Page

The Vineyard Race is an annual sailboat race hosted by the Stamford Yacht Club in Stamford, Connecticut. It is held every Labor Day weekend with the first start scheduled for Friday afternoon. A trophy award party is held on the Stamford Yacht Club lawn on Sunday afternoon.

The 238 nautical miles (274 mi; 441 km) race was started in 1932 and the current course takes racers from Stamford off of navigational buoy R32, east to a clockwise rounding of Buzzards Bay Light Tower, around the south shore of Block Island, and back to R32, honoring R2 off the harbor breakwater, to a finish extending from the Green marker on the breakwater to the race committee finish boat anchored inside Stamford Harbor.

The first race had 23 starters with five finishers. The race has been held every year since its founding, except for three years during World War II.

Competitors who have raced in 10 or more Vineyard races are eligible for entrance into The Buzzard Society.

It is also the final race of the Northern Ocean Racing Trophy series, the New England Lighthouse Series and the Doublehanded Ocean Racing Trophy.

In 1982, the race was described by Bob Bavier in Yachting as one of the "yachting classics." and:

The greatest distance races of the world have several things in common -- a challenging course, competitive fleets and an interesting array of famous yachts. By those standards, the Stamford Yacht Club's Vineyard Race rates close to the top. Like a miniature Fastnet, the Vineyard has a combination of coastal cruising, where currents play a big role, a stretch of ocean sailing, and a mark to round -- the Buzzards Bay tower -- before returning.

== Course and records ==
In recent years the event expanded to three courses. The course selection depends on the size and rating of the boat. There are divisions for double-handed boats as well as fully crewed boats.

- Vineyard Course - 238 nm 238 nautical miles (274 mi; 441 km)
- Seaflower Reef Course - 143 nm 143 nautical miles (165 mi; 265 km)
- Cornfield Point Course - 116 nm 116 nautical miles (133 mi; 215 km)

The Vinyard course records stand:

- Overall: 14 hours, 53 minutes, and 55 seconds in 2020 - Argo MOD 70 Trimaran owned by Jason Carroll
- Monohull: 17 hours, 42 minutes and 9 seconds in 2017 - WARRIOR Volvo 70 owned by the US Merchant Marine Academy Skippered by Stephen Murray, Jr.

The Vineyard Race Course is several races in one. Competitors must navigate Long Island Sound before passing into Block Island Sound through one of several narrow passages where there are tough tidal currents. After rounding the Buzzards Bay Entrance Light, they must leave Block Island to starboard before heading back into the Sound where they must again navigate through one of the several narrow passages and changing tidal currents.

A typical race involves a variety of conditions, and competitors that are able to rapidly adjust to the often-wide variety of changing conditions ranging from being becalmed in adverse current to reaching or running downwind in 25kts of wind most are the ones most often on the podium at the end of the race.
