= Call It Courage =

1940 novel by Armstrong Sperry

- Dust jacket of 1st edition, 1st printing
- Author: Armstrong Sperry
- Illustrator: Armstrong Sperry
- Language: English
- Genre: Children's novel
- Publisher: Macmillan
- Publication date: 1940
- Publication place: United States
- Media type: Print (Hardback & Paperback)
- Pages: 117
- ISBN: 0-689-86229-6

Call It Courage (published as The Boy Who Was Afraid in the United Kingdom) is a 1940 children's novel written and illustrated by American author Armstrong Sperry. The novel won the Newbery Medal for excellence in American children's literature in 1941.

== Plot / summary ==
The book Call It Courage is a novel of 116 pages. It is about a boy who tries to overcome his fear of the sea.

Call It Courage is a story set in the Pacific Islands. It chronicles the journey of Mafatu (literal translation: "Stout Heart"), the son of the chief of Hikueru Island, Tavana Nui. Mafatu is afraid of the sea due to witnessing his mother die while he was a young child, which makes him a shame to his father, and referred to as a coward among his tribe. Mafatu takes a dugout canoe and sets sail into the ocean without knowing where he will end up. He is caught in a storm and the canoe is lost. He lands on a deserted island and learns to hunt and fish for himself, along with his companions Uri, a small yellow dog, and Kivi, an albatross.

Soon Mafatu finds a sacrificial altar built by cannibals from a neighboring island. Mafatu realizes he has inhabited the island for about a week and begins designing his escape by making a canoe. He gathers things he will need to survive a trip across the ocean. He finds a spearhead on the terrible altar and, after attaching it to a shaft, uses it for hunting and defense.

After a number of encounters with natural foes, including a hammerhead shark, a wild boar, and an octopus, all of which he successfully kills, this is when he realizes he is gaining courage and learning to deal with the things that have frightened him. The cannibals return and he makes a daring escape from them, returning home at last to his village. The experience has transformed him into an imposing figure. His father does not recognize him at first, but then he proudly accepts him on his return. Mafatu's story is told throughout the ages to the future generations by his tribe's people. The book has five chapters and 92 readable pages.

== Publications ==
The book was originally published in 1940 and has had numerous printings since then, and has been translated into many languages, including:

- Afrikaans - Die seun wat bang was
- Spanish - Estos es coraje
- French - Le Garçon qui avait peur
- German - Mafatu heißt "Starkes Herz"
- Dutch - Mafatu: een jongen die moed had
- Finnish
- Swedish - Kalla det mod
- Norwegian
- Persian
- Mandarin Chinese - Dahai de haizi
- Japanese
- Samoan - Alaga ia, o le lototele!, translated by Fanaafi Ma`ia`i Larkin, 1965.
- Hindi
- Turkish
- Indonesian
- Arabic
- Hebrew
- Urdu
- Braille
- Portuguese - Mafatu o menino destemido

== Film ==
Call It Courage
- Also known as: The Wonderful World of Disney: Call it Courage
- Based on: Call It Courage by Armstrong Sperry
- Teleplay by: Benjamin Manliness
- Directed by: Roy Edward Disney
- Starring: Evan Marinate
- Narrated by: Don Ho
- Theme music composer: Robert F. Brenner
- Country of origin: United States
- Original language: English

Production
- Editor: Toby Brown
- Running time: 47 min.
- Production company: Walt Disney Pictures

Original release
- Network: NBC
- Release: 1 April 1973

Call it Courage was filmed for television with a teleplay by Benjamin Masselink and a narration by Don Ho, and appeared on The Wonderful World of Disney for the first time on 1 April 1973 (Season 19, Episode 20).

=== Cast ===
- Don Ho as Narrator
- Evan Temarii as Mafatu

=== Production ===
Filmed on location in 1972 on the islands of Bora Bora and Tahiti using local actors speaking in their native dialect. It was directed by Roy Disney.

== Other media ==
=== Musical play ===
A musical version of Call It Courage was performed between 9 April 2010 and 8 May 2010 by Zachary Scott Showstoppers. The music and lyrics for the production were by Adam Overett, and it was directed and choreographed by Adam Roberts. The Associate Director for the musical was Jaclyn Loewenstein.

Awards
Preceded by Daniel Boone	Newbery Medal recipient 1941	Succeeded by The Matchlock Gun
