= Spice and the Devil's Cave =

1930 book by Agnes Hewes

- Author: Agnes Hewes
- Illustrator: Lynd Ward
- Language: English
- Genre: Children's literature / Historical fiction
- Publisher: Knopf
- Publication date: 1930
- Publication place: United States

Spice and the Devil's Cave is 1930 children's historical fiction book written by Agnes Hewes and illustrated by Lynd Ward. Set in Lisbon, Portugal in the late 1490s, Vasco de Gama, Bartholomew Diaz, and Ferdinand Magellan discuss their plans to find the elusive sea route around the Cape of Good Hope, which would enable Portugal to access the spice-rich countries of the Far East. This book earned a Newbery Honor award in 1931.
