= Boat shoe =

Style of footwear

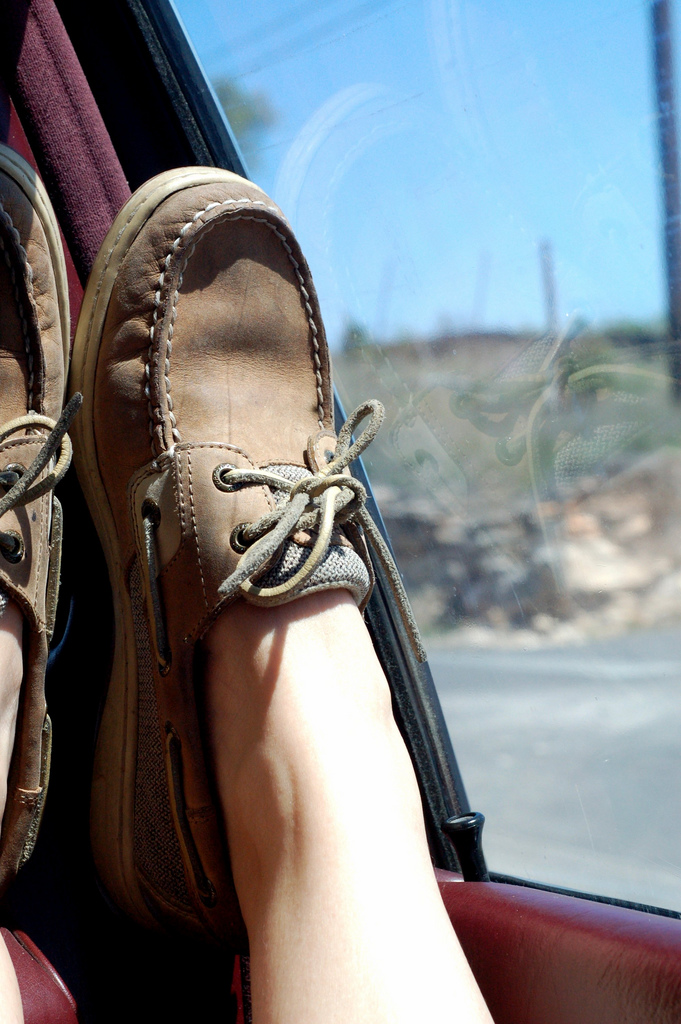
Boat shoes are traditionally worn without socks.

Boat shoes (also known as deck shoes or top-siders) are typically canvas or leather with non-marking rubber soles designed for use on a boat. A siping pattern is cut into the soles to provide grip on a wet deck; the leather construction, along with the application of oil, is designed to repel water; and the stitching is highly durable. Boat shoes are traditionally worn without socks.

== History ==
Modern boat shoes were invented in 1935 by American Paul A. Sperry of New Haven, Connecticut, after noticing his dog's ability to run easily over ice without slipping. Using a knife, he cut siping into his shoes' soles, inspiring a shoe appropriate for boating and a company called Sperry Top-Sider; Sperry Top-Siders are still a popular brand of boat shoe today, among many others, including Boatman Shoes, Portside, Sebago and Timberland. Boat shoes are worn by both women and men.

== Use ==
Sailors use boat shoes, as the name suggests; however, since the 1970s they have become casual footwear in coastal areas of the Netherlands, the United States, Canada, Argentina, Australia, China, France, Italy, Portugal, Spain, Germany and the United Kingdom. Many boat shoes today retain traditional white, non-marking soles, though many others have dark non-marking soles. They usually have a moc-toe (like a moccasin) construction.

They are partially seen as a status symbol as boat ownership is associated with wealth. The fashion is widely popular in many countries from elementary to college age. Boat shoes are popular for everyday wear. Many schools with uniform requirements allow boat shoes to be worn as they are made in part or entirely of leather.

In the 1980s, they became a fashion trend that returned in the late 2000s. They can be worn with everyday and dress wear by all ages and genders.

Sebago, Sperry Top-Siders and Eastland were the most popular brands and have remained so through 2000s revival. Boat shoes are a common component in nautical style and preppy fashion. They can be worn with socks and pants or shorts and no socks.

== See also ==
- List of shoe styles
