= Jaunzeme =

Family name

Origin
- Origin: Latvian
- Meaning: "new farmer"

Jaunzeme (masculine: Jaunzems or Jaunzemis) is a Latvian occupational surname, derived from the Latvian word for "new farmer" (from jauns – "new" and zeme – "land"). Individuals with the surname include:

- Inese Jaunzeme (1932–2011), Latvian javelin thrower
- Žaneta Jaunzeme-Grende (born 1964), Latvian politician and businesswoman
- Ryan Jaunzemis (born 1980), Latvian-American Soap master
