= Heelys, Inc. =

American footwear company

- Company type: Public
- Traded as: Nasdaq: HLYS (2006–2013)
- Industry: Footwear
- Founded: May 2000; 26 years ago (as Heeling Sports Limited); Nevada, U.S. December 2000 (as Heelys, Inc.)
- Headquarters: Carrollton, Texas, U.S.
- Revenue: ▼US$ 5.60 million (2011)
- Number of employees: About 20,000
- Website: www.heelys.com

Heelys, Inc., formerly known as Heeling Sports Limited, is the company which currently owns the Heelys, Soap, and Axis (unofficially defunct) brands. Heelys' headquarters is, and for its entire history has been, located in Carrollton, Texas.

Heeling Sports Limited started in 2000 as the parent company to the brand responsible for its existence - Heelys shoes. The concept of shoes with a wheel in the sole was pushed forward by the company's founder and the creator of the Heely, Roger Adams.

Heavy marketing for the Heely was always focused on advancing the shoes outreach. Heelys once rapidly gained popularity. However, from 2009 onward, Heelys have lost much of their popularity from declining sales, inventory issues and safety concerns (especially among children).

Even before the invention of the shoe with a wheel in the heel, Mr. Adams had been in contact with the creator of Soap shoes, Chris Morris. Mr. Adams presented to him the idea of a hybrid shoe: a Heelys shoe which utilizes Soap's patented grindplate. Morris ultimately turned down the idea, and the two innovators went their separate ways, pursuing what they had started.

On August 31, 2021, Heelys' parent company, Sequential Brands, filed for Chapter 11 bankruptcy protection.

Roger Adams died on March 24, 2026 at the age of 71.

== Acquisition ==
On September 25, 2002, the agreement to purchase Soap and all of its assets from the recently bankrupted company In-Stride was signed by Heelys CEO, Mike Staffaroni. Plans for a large line of new models were immediately set, and were released in 2003.

Many of Heelys' signature colorways and styles can be seen incorporated into the newest Soap shoes. A number of changes were also made. The center of complaint replying to Heelys' new styling was the lack of variety; nearly all of the shoes had the same lower half, and even their upper sections were somewhat similar, more or less from model to model. In some cases, the designs were direct recycles from older Heelys shoes, except sporting a different grindplate and trademark. In 2013, Heelys stock had sunk down to $2.25 per share and was sold to Sequential Brand Group for $63.2 million.

Shortly before Sequential Brands had filed for bankruptcy, Sequential Brands sold the Heelys brand to BBC International for $11 million.
