= Soap (shoes) =

Shoe brand

- Company type: Subsidiary of Heelys
- Industry: Extreme Sports Equipment
- Founded: Torrance, California (1997)
- Headquarters: Carrollton, Texas, U.S.
- Products: Grinding shoes, Grindplates, apparel
- Revenue: undisclosed
- Number of employees: undisclosed

Soap was a brand of athletic shoes designed specifically for grinding, similar in concept to aggressive inline skating. The shoes were introduced in 1996 by Chris Morris of Artemis Innovations Inc. under the brand name "Soap." They featured a plastic concavity embedded in the sole, enabling the wearer to grind on surfaces such as handrails, ledges, and pipes. The brand gained popularity through online communities and live demonstrations, and Soap shoes were featured in the Sonic the Hedgehog video game franchise. The brand faced legal and financial difficulties and was sold multiple times, eventually acquired by Heeling Sports Limited (HSL), the company behind Heelys.

== History ==
Soap shoes were inspired by rollerblades and aggressive skating. Chris Morris, a former Rollerblade employee in Torrance, California, developed a shoe with a grind plate embedded in the sole for grinding. Morris enlisted the design firm Concept 21 to create a prototype, leading to the founding of Artemis Innovations, which sold Soap shoes for the first four years. In 2001, Morris lost control of the Soap license due to legal issues, and the remaining executives sold the brand.

Soap was then acquired by In-Stride, a company primarily known for wrestling gear. However, In-Stride filed for bankruptcy in late 2002, making Soap available for acquisition again. Later that year, Heeling Sports Limited, the manufacture of Heelys, purchased Soap.

"Soap" had a professional team, including former professional inline skaters such as Ryan Jaunzemis, Brandon L. Blackburn, Danny Lynch, Paul Cifuentes, Eddie Ramirez, and Ben Kelly, who led research and wear-testing. In the late 1990s and early 2000s, regional crews from across the Americas and Europe shared online videos, supported by a dedicated online community of "Soapers." These crews and forums have since become inactive. Derek Brooks, a former team captain, continues to promote Soap through the website SolidGrind.com. The Melbourne Soapers, led by Greg Crellin, also maintain a Facebook page dedicated to the brand.

== Soap shoes in Sonic the Hedgehog ==
In the 2001 video game Sonic Adventure 2, developed by Sonic Team USA, Soap shoes were featured as an in-game accessory. Billboards, blimps, and benches in the game displayed Soap advertisements, and the character Sonic wore a custom version of the Scorcher/Nitro model. Soap shoes reappeared in Sonic Forces as an unlockable accessory for the Avatar character in three colors, one matching the 'Sonic Adventure 2' design, and in Sonic Frontiers as a bonus DLC for newsletter subscribers, then later for all players.In the anime Sonic X, Sonic wears Soap shoes in two episodes to gain an advantage in battles. The HD re-release of 'Sonic Adventure 2' retained in-game advertisements but removed the Soap-specific branding.
