= Heelys =

Brand of roller shoes

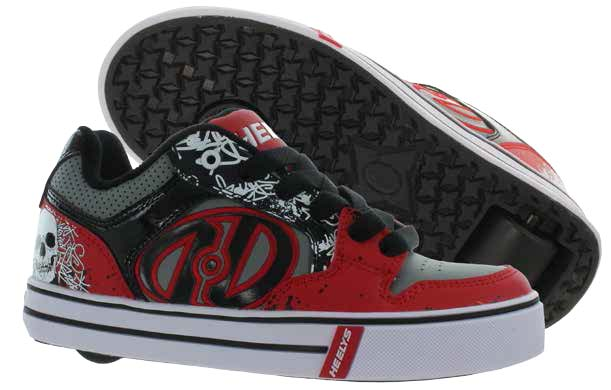
A pair of Heelys

Heelys (formerly known as Heeling Sports Limited) is an American brand of roller shoe (marketed by Heelys, Inc.) that have one or more removable wheels embedded in each sole, similar to inline skates, allowing the wearer to walk, run, or, by shifting their weight to their heels, roll. Braking can be achieved by lowering the back of the foot so that the sole contacts the ground. Roger Adams (1954-2026) patented Heelys in 1999. The headquarters are located in Carrollton, Texas.

== Protective equipment ==
Per the manufacturer, "We highly recommend [the use of protective gear] when the wheels are in the shoes." Most users do not wear protective gear because the shoes are worn for everyday use (unlike more specialized sporting equipment such as inline skates).

== Tricks ==
Advanced Heelys users can perform tricks such as spins, backwards skating and skating on one foot.

There are four categories of tricks used in heeling: ground tricks, grinding tricks, stalling tricks and vert tricks.

- Ground tricks — the main category of tricks used in heeling.
- Grinds — these tricks can only be performed if the model has a nylon pad in the shoe, it involves jumping on a surface, landing on the nylon pad and sliding across the surface.
- Stalls — generally involves jumping onto a raised object and pausing before jumping off and heeling once more.
- Vert — any type of tricks performed on a vert ramp.
- Flips — usually performed on a trampoline or off a high surface that has a soft surface under. Jump up and tuck just as a normal flip (try landing on wheels after feet).

== Roger R. Adams ==
Roger Ralph Adams (1954 – March 24, 2026) was an American psychologist and inventor best known for creating Heelys. Adams died from pancreatic cancer on March 24, 2026, at the age of 71.

== Controversy ==
The journal of the American Academy of Pediatrics published a study of injuries resulting from the use of Heelys (and Street Gliders, a similar product that is strapped onto regular shoes). The study counted only significant injuries that required assessment by an orthopedic surgeon, ignoring minor injuries that were treated solely in the emergency department. The 10-week study (conducted during summer school holiday), found:

- An injury rate of approximately 51 injuries per 100,000 children (for injuries requiring orthopedic attention; the rate for less-serious injuries is unknown but presumably much higher). For comparison, in 1997 in the United States, nonfatal dog bites required 151 emergency department visits per 100,000 people in the population (including adults).
- 34% of the injuries were suffered by children using Heelys (or Street Gliders) for the very first time. 70% had used the products five or fewer times.
- The injuries comprised 8% of the workload for the pediatric orthopedic department.
- 12% of the injured children were familiar with the instructions for use of the products.

== See also ==
- Inline skates
- Roller shoe
- Roller skates
- Skateboard
- List of shoe styles
