= Roller shoe =

Shoe with wheels

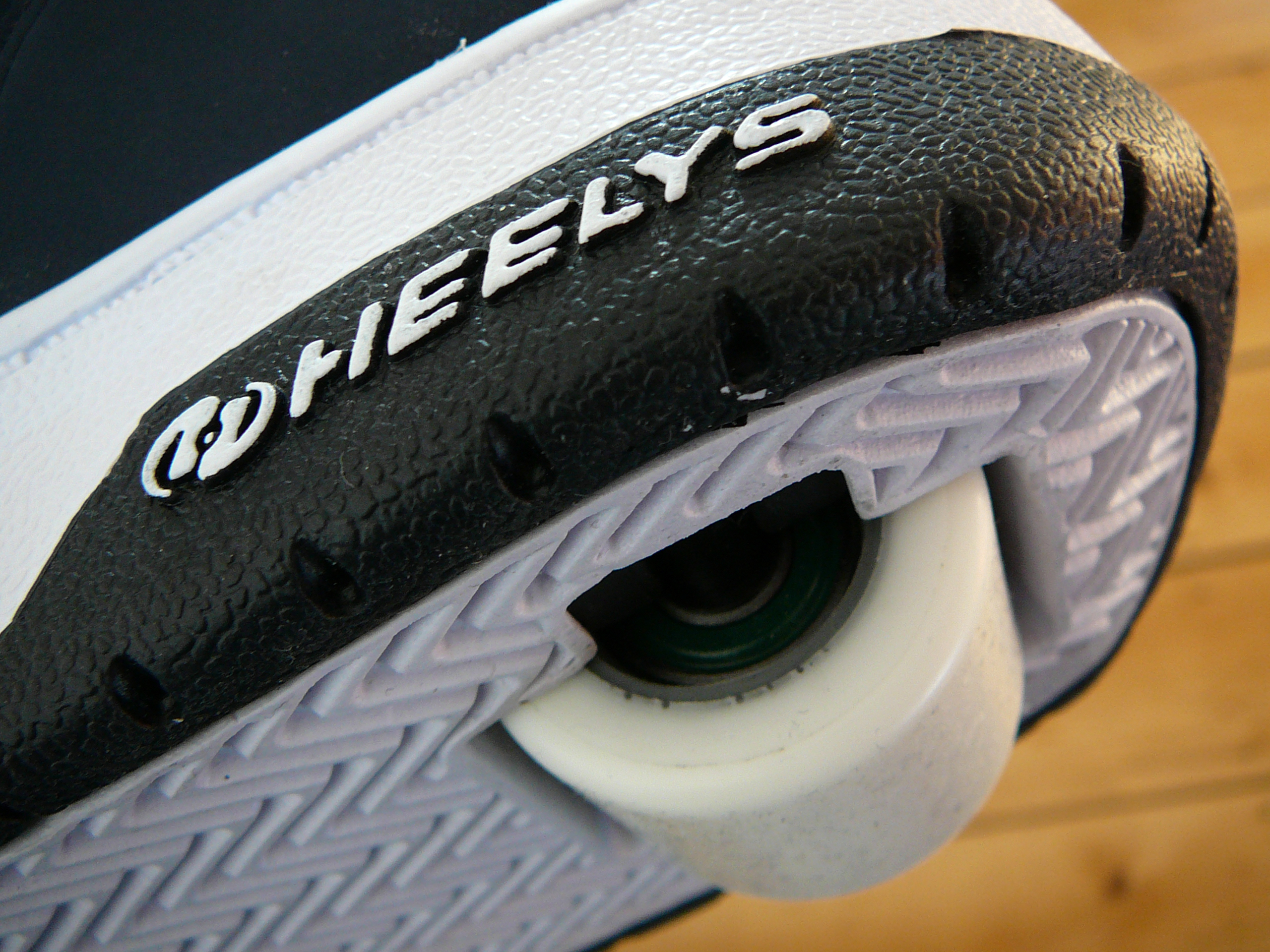
The wheel of a Heelys roller shoe.

Roller shoes are shoes that have wheels protruding slightly from the heel, allowing the wearer to alternate between walking and rolling. They were first created by Roger Adams in 1999 and popularized under the brand name Heelys. They became a trend in the 2000s, becoming popular with children and teenagers. Following the growth in popularity, roller shoes with 2 wheels became popular in order to make learning easier for beginners. Roller Shoes have seen a resurgence in the 2020s as 2000s culture has seen an increase in nostalgic interest.

In order to roll using the shoes, the user keeps their feet flat to keep the wheel on the ground and stopping is done by pointing the foot upwards so the rear of the shoe makes contact with the ground. There are a number of tricks that can be done with them, including pop wheelies and spins

== See also ==
- Heelys
- List of shoe styles
