= Ryan Jaunzemis =

American internet personality and songwriter

Ryan Jaunzemis (born February 5, 1980, Inglewood, California), is an American dating coach, YouTuber, and professional rollerblader, and is most known for being sponsored by Soap Shoes.

== Early career ==
Jaunzemis rose to prominence in 1997 after being signed onto the fledgling "grind shoe" company, Soap Shoes. He became known after being featured in sales commercials for Soap Shoes depicting Jaunzemis grinding down a 5-stair handrail, which went viral on the internet and America Online in 1998. He was described by Vice as being the "poster boy for the 90s fad". These commercials were also played in retail stores such as Journeys (company), Pacific Sunwear (now PacSun), Gadzooks (retailer), and many other national & local retailers throughout the country. He was also featured in Relate Video Productions' famous full-length Soap videos, "oNe" & "tWo". Jaunzemis toured with Soap Shoes on their 1997, ‘98, & ‘99 US demo tours. This earned Jaunzemis the title, "Best Soaper In The World" by the website, "SoapShoe.com".

In 1999 Jaunzemis was fired from Soap Shoes by then CEO, Chris Morris, after Jaunzemis mis-sent an expletive & insult filled E-mail; describing his personal issues with the company, and with the owner.

On December 31, 1999, Jaunzemis went to Times Square to celebrate the 3rd millennium.

Jaunzemis was the subject of a documentary, Soap Or Die in 2016. He was also a major character in the film, Lords of Soaptown,
