= Jaunzems =

Jaunzems is a surname. Notable people with the surname include:

- Alvis Jaunzems (born 1999), Latvian footballer
- Linards Jaunzems (born 1995), Latvian basketball player
