= Shoe =

Footwear

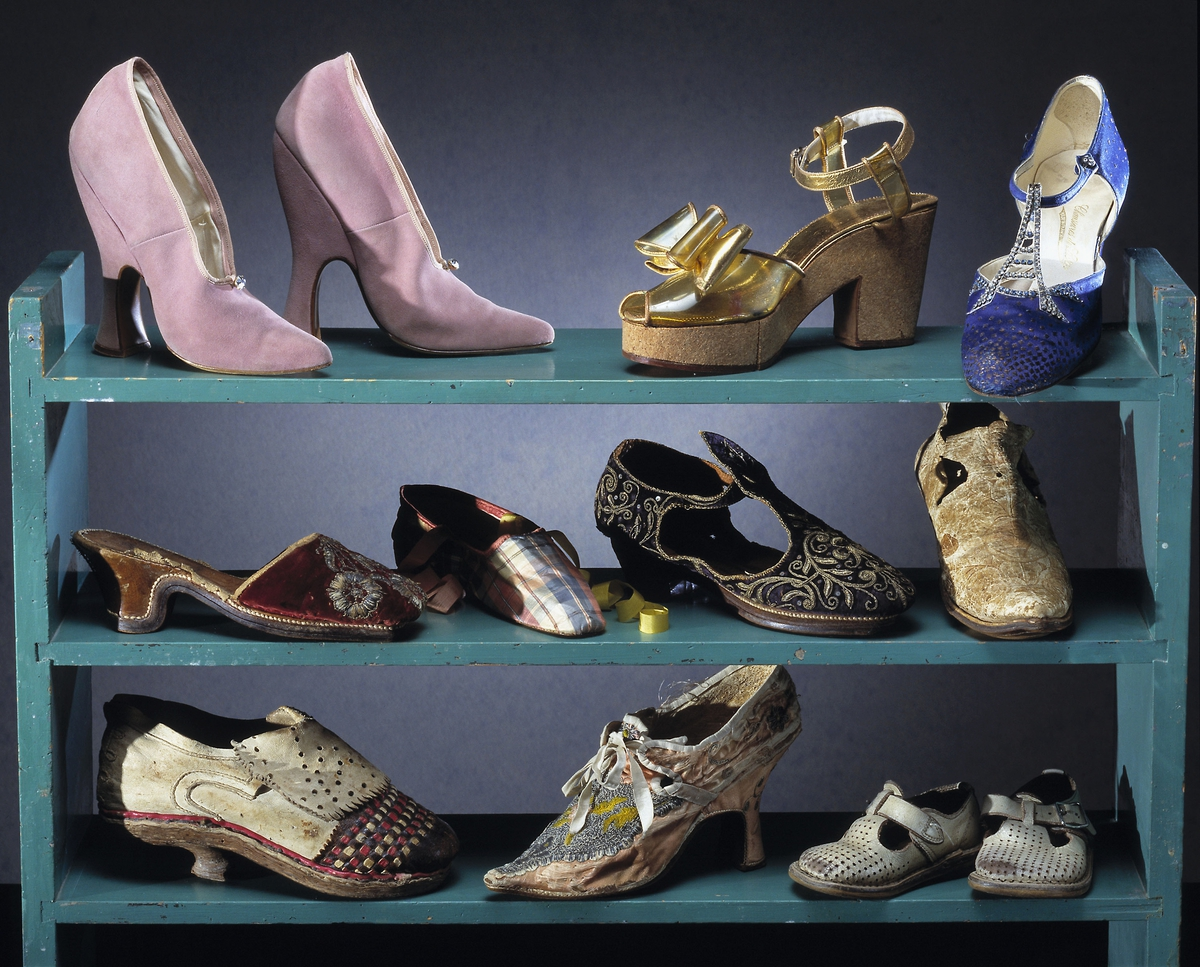
A variety of shoes displayed at the Nordic Museum, including models from 1700 to the 1960s.

A shoe is an item of footwear normally found in pairs intended to protect and comfort the human foot, usually made in such a way that one is designed to fit the left foot and the other the right foot.

Shoes are intended to provide further protection to the vulnerable human foot, though the foot is highly adaptable to various terrains. Form was originally tied to function, but over time, shoes also became fashion items. Some shoes are worn as safety equipment, such as steel-toe boots, which are required footwear at industrial worksites.

Additionally, shoes have often evolved into many different designs; high heels, for instance, are most commonly worn by women during fancy occasions. Contemporary footwear varies vastly in style, complexity and cost. Basic sandals may consist of only a thin sole and simple strap and be sold for a low cost. High fashion shoes made by famous designers may be made of expensive materials, use complex construction and sell for large sums of money. Some shoes are designed for specific purposes, such as boots designed specifically for mountaineering or skiing, while others have more generalized usage such as sneakers which have transformed from a special purpose sport shoe into a general use shoe.

Traditionally, shoes have been made from leather, wood or canvas, but are increasingly being made from rubber, plastics, and other petrochemical-derived materials. Globally, the shoe industry is a $200 billion a year industry. 90% of shoes end up in landfills, because the materials are hard to separate, recycle or otherwise reuse.

== History ==
=== Antiquity ===
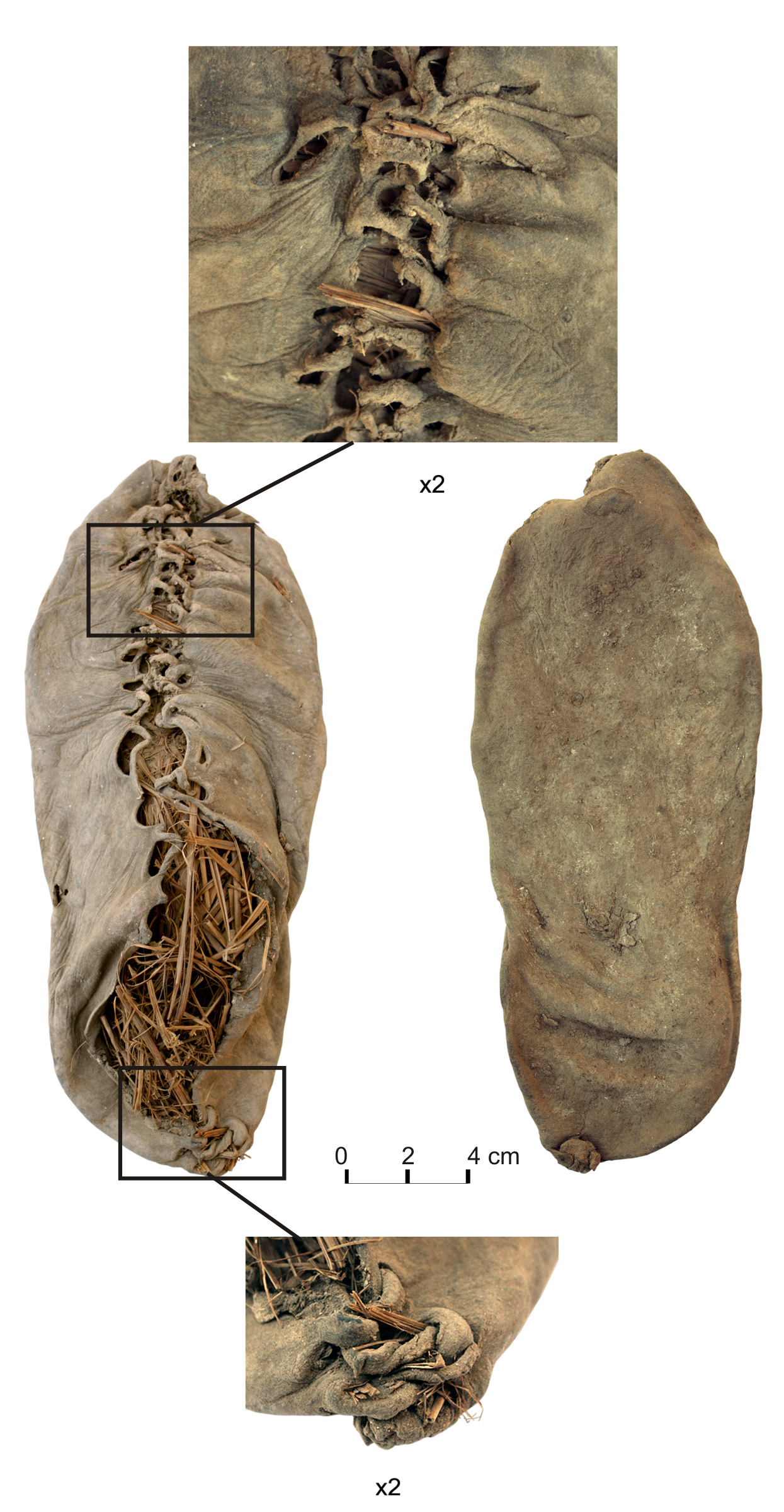
The oldest known leather shoe, about 5500 years old, found in Armenia

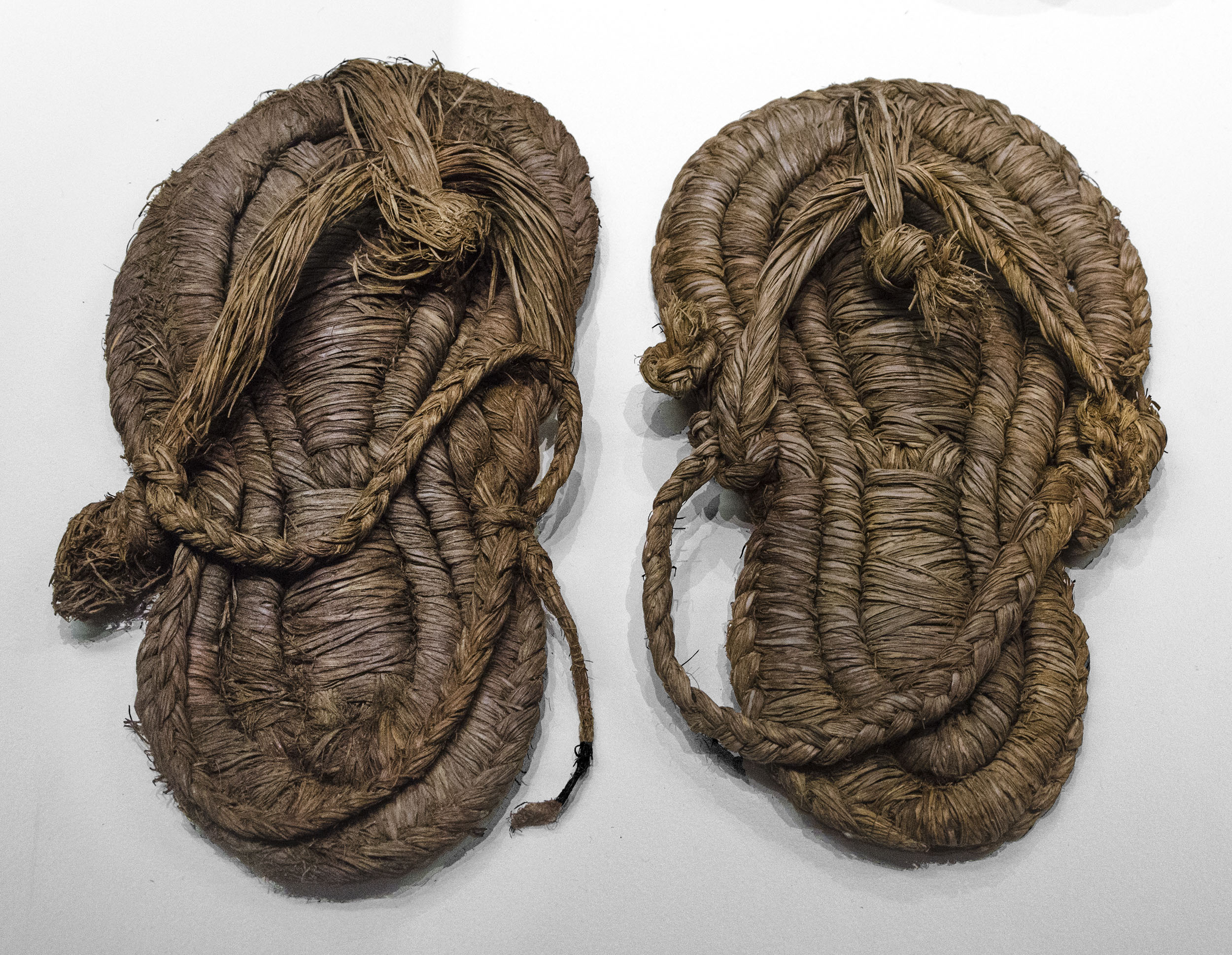
Esparto sandals from the 6th or 5th millennium BC found in Spain

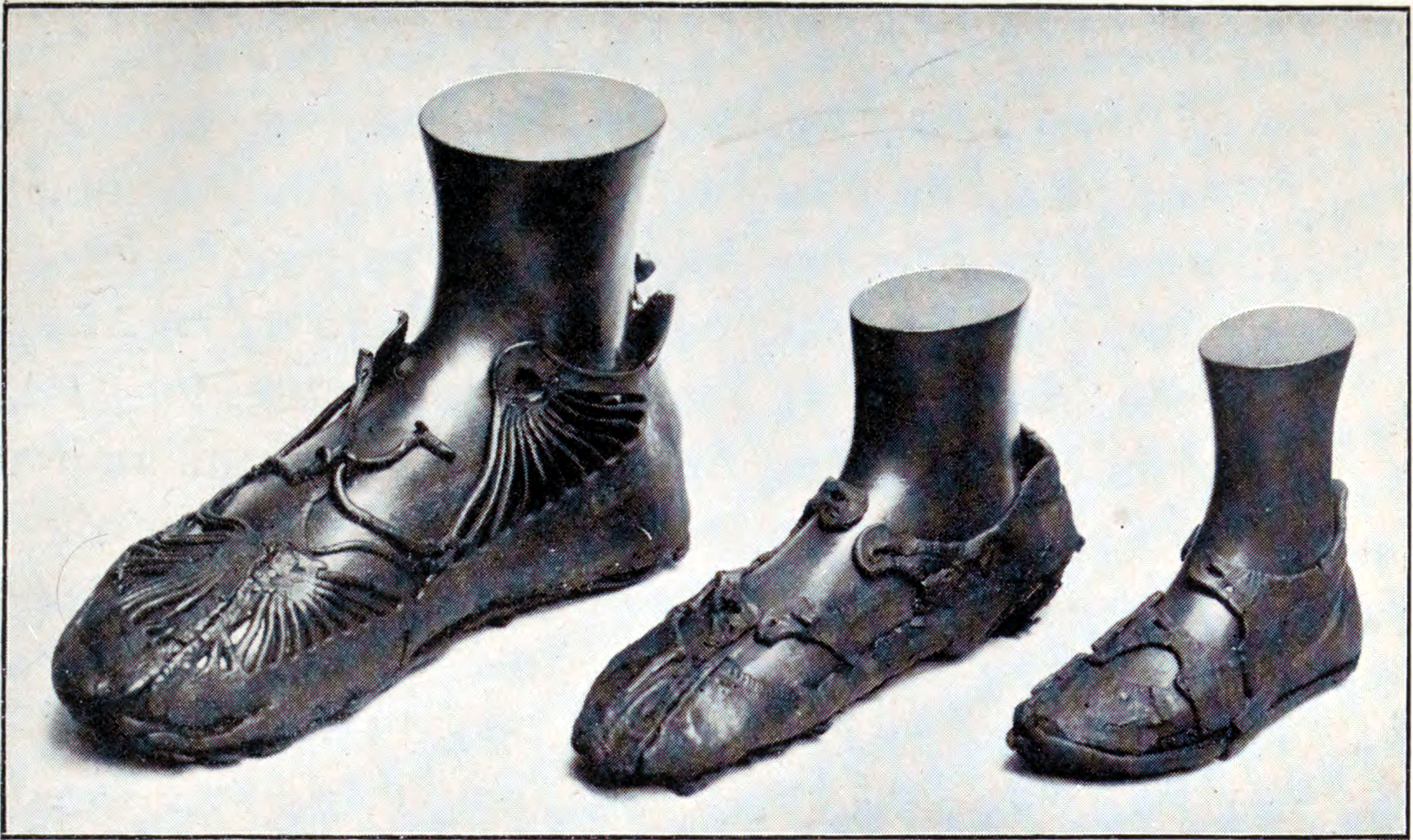
Roman shoes: a man's, a woman's and a child's shoe from Bar Hill Roman Fort, Scotland.

==== Earliest evidence ====
The earliest known shoes are sagebrush bark sandals dating from approximately 10,500 BP to 9200 BP, found in the Fort Rock Cave in the US state of Oregon in 1938. The world's oldest leather shoe, made from a single piece of cowhide laced with a leather cord along seams at the front and back, was found in the Areni-1 cave complex in Armenia in 2008 and is believed to date to 3500 BC. Ötzi the Iceman's shoes, dating to 3300 BC, featured brown bearskin bases, deerskin side panels, and a bark-string net, which pulled tight around the foot. The Jotunheimen shoe was discovered in August 2006: archaeologists estimate that this leather shoe was made between 1800 and 1100 BC, making it the oldest article of clothing discovered in Scandinavia. Sandals and other plant fiber based tools were found in Cueva de los Murciélagos in Albuñol in southern Spain in 2023, dating to approximately 7500 to 4200 BC, making them what are believed to be the oldest shoes found in Europe.

It is thought that shoes may have been used long before this, but because the materials used were highly perishable, it is difficult to find evidence of the earliest footwear.

Footprints suggestive of shoes or sandals due to having crisp edges, no signs of toes found and three small divots where leather tying laces/straps would have been attached have been at Garden Route National Park, Addo Elephant National Park and Goukamma Nature Reserve in South Africa. These date back to between 73,000 and 136,000 BP. Consistent with the existence of such shoe is the finding of bone awls dating back to this period that could have made simple footwear.

Another source of evidence is the study of the bones of the smaller toes (as opposed to the big toe); it was observed that their thickness decreased approximately 40,000 to 26,000 years ago. This led archaeologists to deduce the existence of common rather than an occasional wearing of shoes as this would lead to less bone growth, resulting in shorter, thinner toes. These earliest designs were very simple, often mere "foot bags" of leather to protect the feet from rocks, debris, and cold.

==== Americas ====
Many early natives in North America wore a similar type of footwear, known as the moccasin. These are tight-fitting, soft-soled shoes typically made out of leather or bison hides. Many moccasins were also decorated with various beads and other adornments. Moccasins were not designed to be waterproof, and in wet weather and warm summer months, most Native Americans went barefoot. The leaves of the sisal plant were used to make twine for sandals in South America while the natives of Mexico used the Yucca plant.

==== Africa and Middle East ====
As civilizations began to develop, thong sandals (precursors to the modern flip-flop) were worn. This practice dates back to pictures of them in ancient Egyptian murals from 4000 BC. "Thebet" may have been the term used to describe these sandals in Egyptian times, possibly from the city Thebes. The Middle Kingdom is when the first of these thebets were found, but it is possible that it debuted in the Early Dynastic Period. One pair found in Europe was made of papyrus leaves and dated to be approximately 1,500 years old. They were also worn in Jerusalem during the first century of the Christian era. Thong sandals were worn by many civilizations and made from a vast variety of materials. Ancient Egyptian sandals were made from papyrus and palm leaves. The Masai of Africa made them out of rawhide. In India they were made from wood.

While thong sandals were commonly worn, many people in ancient times, such as the Egyptians, Hindus and Greeks, saw little need for footwear, and most of the time, preferred being barefoot. The Egyptians and Hindus made some use of ornamental footwear, such as a soleless sandal known as a "Cleopatra", which did not provide any practical protection for the foot.

==== Asia and Europe ====
The ancient Greeks largely viewed footwear as self-indulgent, unaesthetic and unnecessary. They typically preferred to go barefoot, with shoes primarily worn in the theater, as a means of increasing stature. Athletes in the Ancient Olympic Games participated barefoot and naked. The ancient Greek gods and heroes were primarily depicted barefoot, as well as the hoplite warriors. They fought battles in bare feet; Alexander the Great led barefoot armies in military campaigns. The runners of ancient Greece are also believed to have run barefoot.

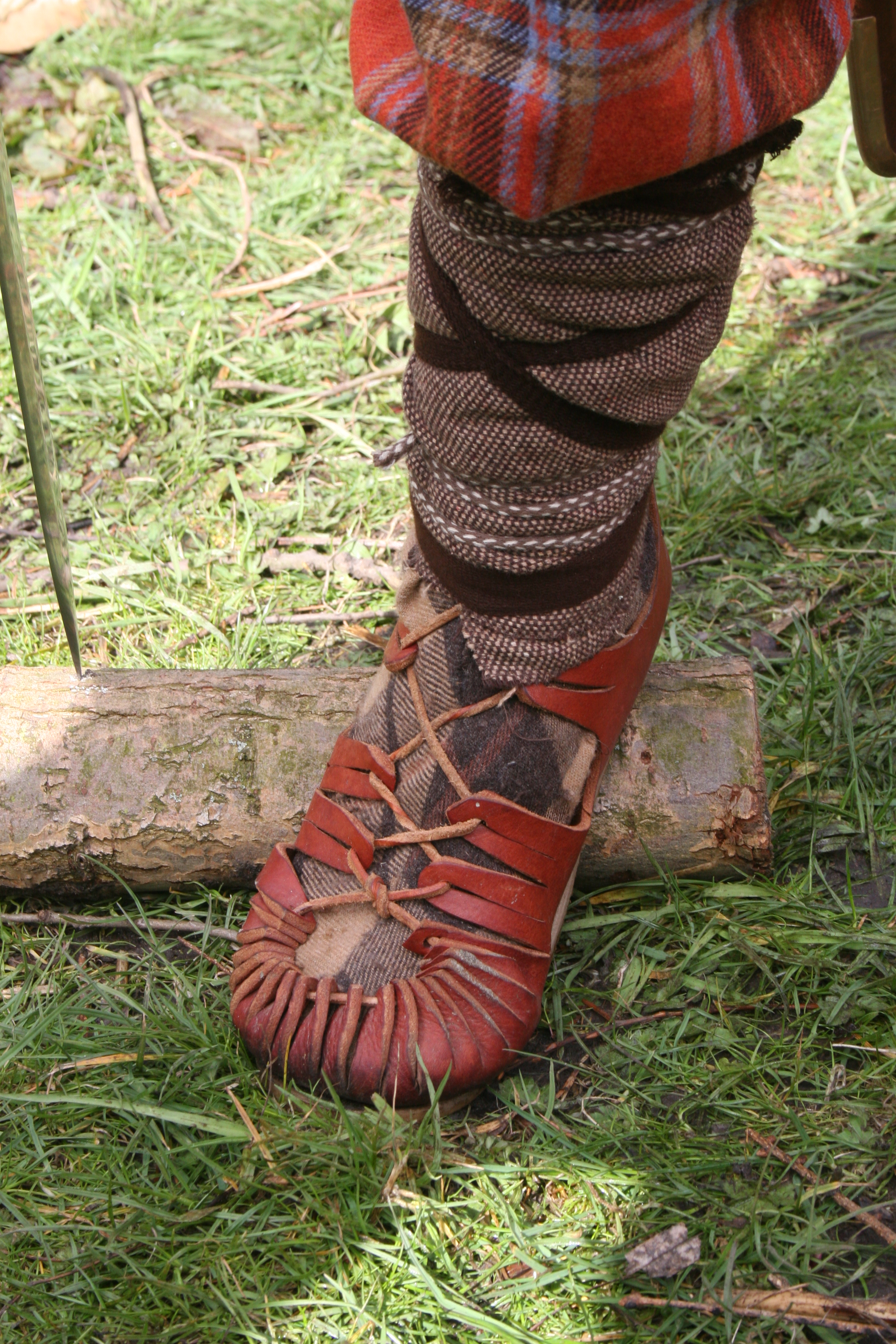
Footwear of Roman soldiers (reconstruction)

The Romans did not accept the Greek perception of footwear and clothing, despite having adopted much else of their culture. Clothing in ancient Rome signified power and footwear was seen as a civilizational necessity, although the slaves and paupers usually went barefoot. Roman soldiers were issued with chiral (left and right shoe different) footwear. Shoes for soldiers had riveted insoles to extend the life of the leather, increase comfort, and provide better traction. The design of these shoes also designated the rank of the officers. The more intricate the insignia and the higher up the boot went on the leg, the higher the rank of the soldier. There are references to shoes being worn in the Bible. In China and Japan, rice straw is a traditional material for making footwear.

Starting around 4 BC, the Greeks began wearing symbolic footwear. These were heavily decorated to clearly indicate the status of the wearer. Courtesans wore leather shoes colored with white, green, lemon or yellow dyes, and young woman betrothed or newly married wore pure white shoes. Because of the cost to lighten leather, shoes of a paler shade were a symbol of wealth in the upper class. Often, the soles would be carved with a message so it would imprint on the ground. Cobblers became a notable profession around this time, with Greek shoemakers becoming famed in the Roman Empire.

=== Middle Ages and early modern period ===
==== Asia and Europe ====
A common casual shoe in the Pyrenees during the Middle Ages was the espadrille. This is a sandal with braided jute soles and a fabric upper portion, and often includes fabric laces that tie around the ankle. The term is French and comes from the esparto grass. The shoe originated in the Catalonian region of Spain as early as the 13th century, and was commonly worn by peasants in the farming communities in the area.

New styles began to develop during the Song dynasty in China, some of them resulting from the binding of women's feet, first used by the noble Han classes, but soon spreading throughout Chinese society. The practice allegedly started during the Shang dynasty, but it grew popular by c. AD 960.

When the Mongols conquered China, they dissolved the practice in 1279, and the Manchus banned foot binding in 1644. The Han people, however, continued the practice without much government intervention.

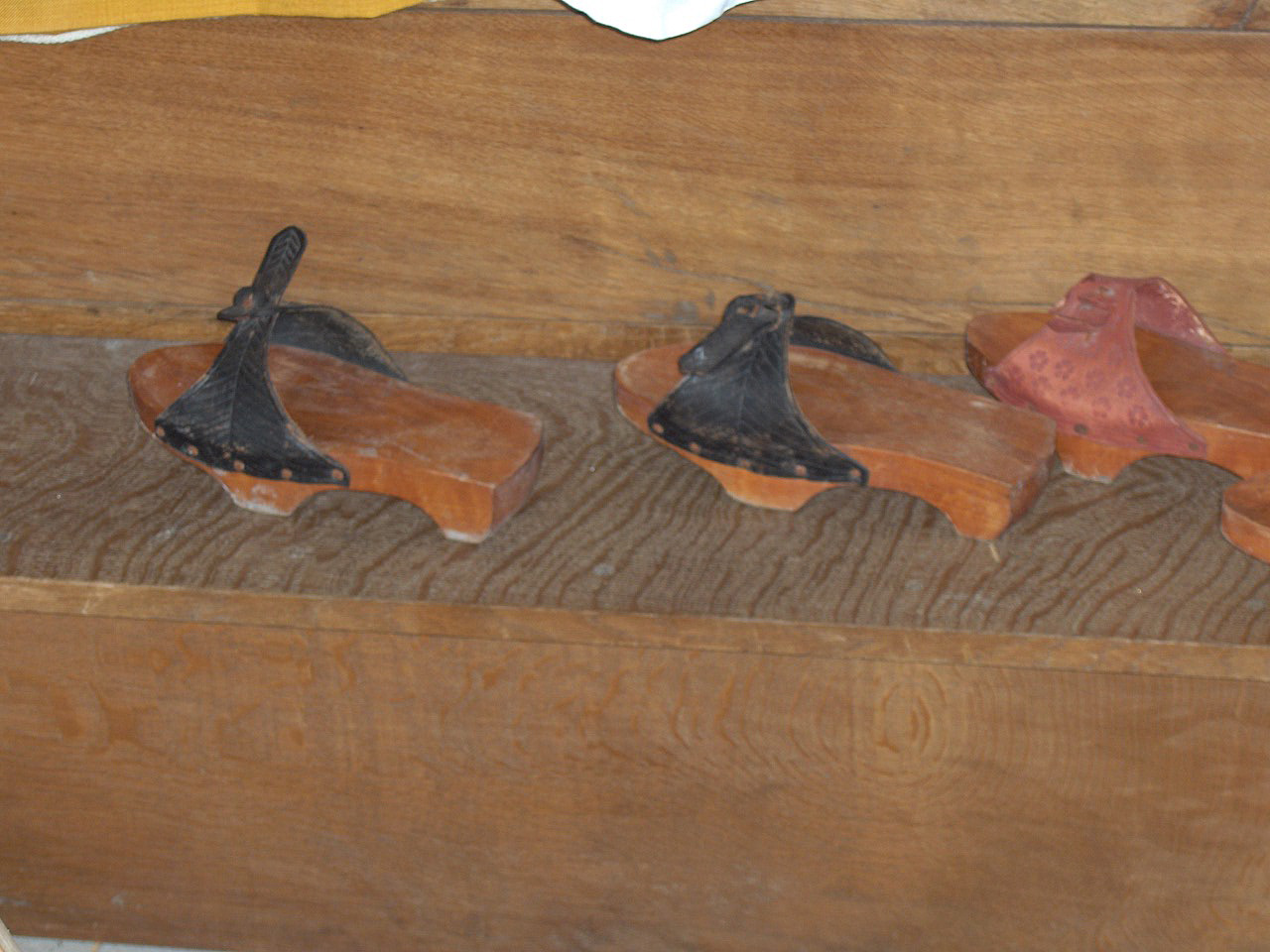
Dutch pattens, c. 1465. Excavated from the archeological site of Walraversijde, near Ostend, Belgium

In medieval times shoes could be up to 2 feet (61 cm) long, with their toes sometimes filled with hair, wool, moss, or grass. Many medieval shoes were made using the turnshoe method of construction, in which the upper was turned flesh side out, and was lasted onto the sole and joined to the edge by a seam. The shoe was then turned inside-out so that the grain was outside. Some shoes were developed with toggled flaps or drawstrings to tighten the leather around the foot for a better fit. Surviving medieval turnshoes often fit the foot closely, with the right and left shoe being mirror images. Around 1500, the turnshoe method was largely replaced by the welted rand method (where the uppers are sewn to a much stiffer sole and the shoe cannot be turned inside-out). The turn shoe method is still used for some dance and specialty shoes.

By the 15th century, pattens became popular by both men and women in Europe. These are commonly seen as the predecessor of the modern high-heeled shoe, while the poor and lower classes in Europe, as well as slaves in the New World, were barefoot. In the 15th century, the Crakow was fashionable in Europe. This style of shoe is named because it is thought to have originated in Kraków, the capital of Poland. The style is characterized by the point of the shoe, known as the "polaine", which often was supported by a whalebone tied to the knee to prevent the point getting in the way while walking. Also during the 15th century, chopines were created in Spain, and were usually 7–8 in (180–200 mm) high. These shoes became popular in Venice and throughout Europe, as a status symbol revealing wealth and social standing. During the 16th century, royalty, such as Catherine de Medici or Mary I of England, started wearing high-heeled shoes to make them look taller or larger than life. By 1580, even men wore them, and a person with authority or wealth was often referred to as, "well-heeled". In 17th century France, heels were exclusively worn by aristocrats. King Louis XIV outlawed anybody from wearing red high heels except for himself and his royal court.

Eventually the modern shoe, with a sewn-on sole, was devised. Since the 17th century, most leather shoes have used a sewn-on sole. This remains the standard for finer-quality dress shoes today. Until around 1800, welted rand shoes were commonly made without differentiation for the left or right foot. Such shoes are now referred to as "straights". Only gradually did the modern foot-specific shoe become standard.

=== Industrial era ===
==== Asia and Europe ====
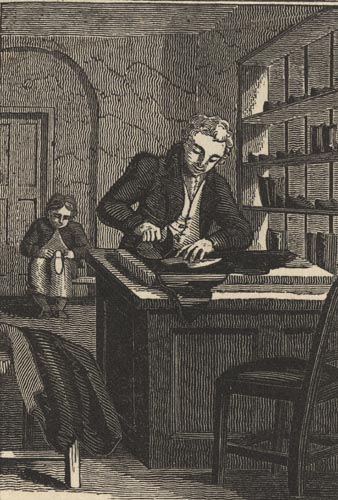
A shoemaker in the Georgian era, from The Book of English Trades, 1821.

Shoemaking became more commercialized in the mid-18th century, as it expanded as a cottage industry. Large warehouses began to stock footwear, made by many small manufacturers from the area.

Until the 19th century, shoemaking was a traditional handicraft, but by the century's end, the process had been almost completely mechanized, with production occurring in large factories. Despite the obvious economic gains of mass production, the factory system produced shoes without the individual differentiation that the traditional shoemaker was able to provide.

In the 19th century Chinese feminists called for an end to foot binding, and a ban in 1902 was implemented. The ban was soon repealed, but it was banned again in 1911 by the new Nationalist government. It was effective in coastal cities, but countryside cities continued without much regulation. Mao Zedong enforced the rule in 1949 and the practice is still forbidden. A number of women still have bound feet today.

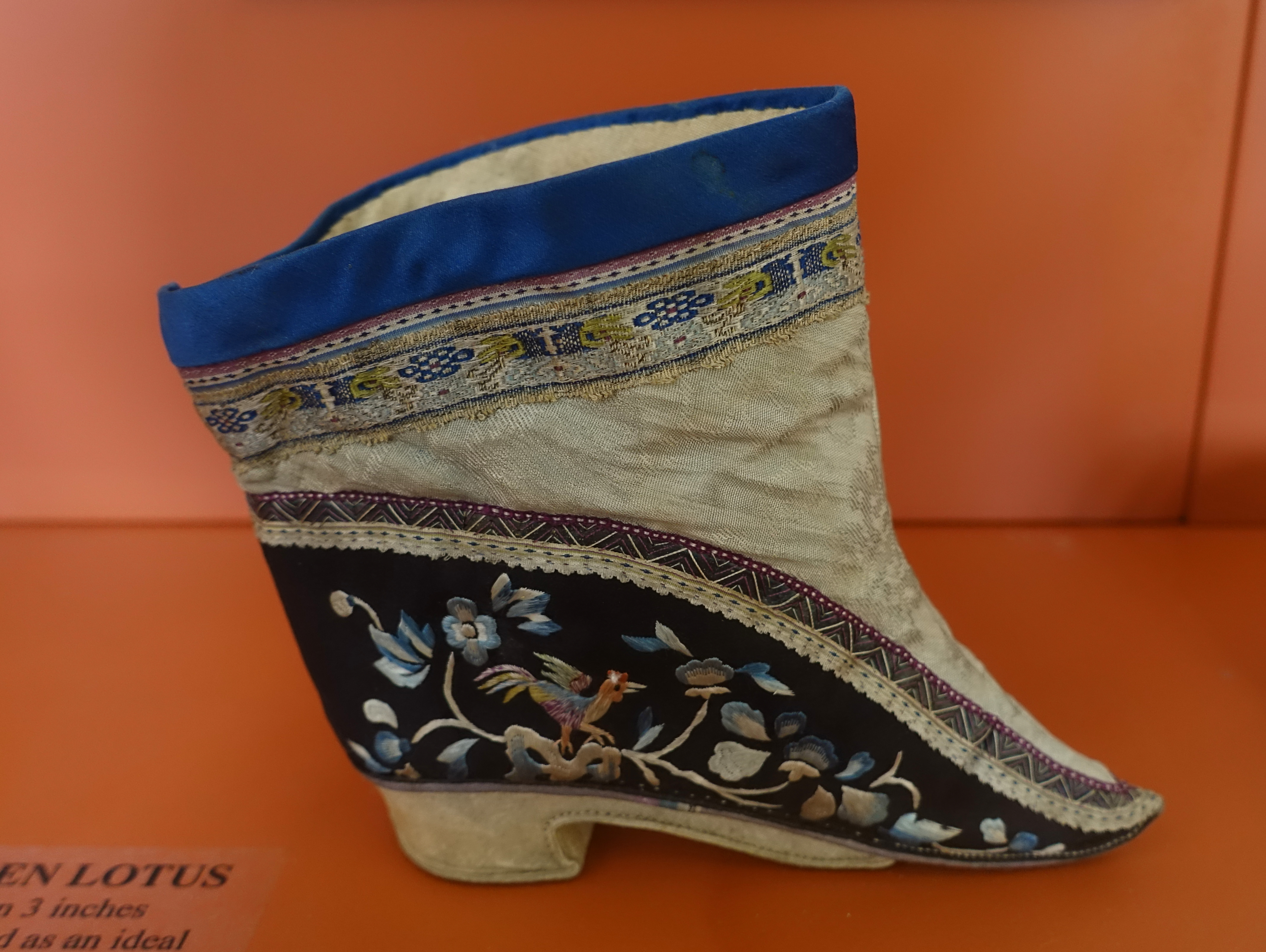
Woman's shoe, China, possibly Shanxi or Ningbo style, late 19th to early 20th century

The first steps towards mechanisation were taken during the Napoleonic Wars by the engineer, Marc Brunel. He developed machinery for the mass production of boots for the soldiers of the British Army. In 1812, he devised a scheme for making nailed-boot-making machinery that automatically fastened soles to uppers by means of metallic pins or nails. With the support of the Duke of York, the shoes were manufactured, and, due to their strength, cheapness, and durability, were introduced for the use of the army. In the same year, the use of screws and staples was patented by Richard Woodman. Brunel's system was described by Sir Richard Phillips as a visitor to his factory in Battersea as follows:

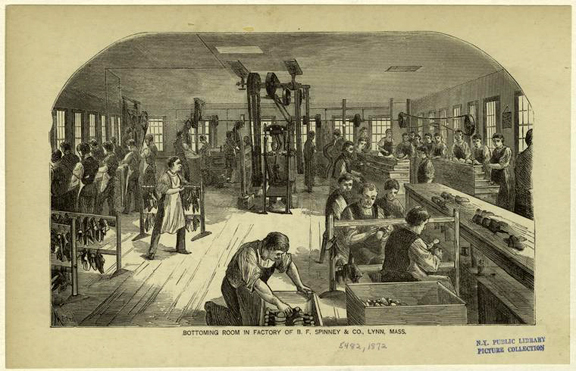
By the late 19th century, the shoemaking industry had migrated to the factory and was increasingly mechanized. Pictured, the bottoming room of the B. F. Spinney & Co. factory in Lynn, Massachusetts, 1872.

In another building I was shown his manufactory of shoes, which, like the other, is full of ingenuity, and, in regard to subdivision of labour, brings this fabric on a level with the oft-admired manufactory of pins. Every step in it is affected by the most elegant and precise machinery; while, as each operation is performed by one hand, so each shoe passes through twenty-five hands, who complete from the hide, as supplied by the currier, a hundred pairs of strong and well-finished shoes per day. All the details are performed by the ingenious application of the mechanic powers; and all the parts are characterised by precision, uniformity, and accuracy. As each man performs but one step in the process, which implies no knowledge of what is done by those who go before or follow him, so the persons employed are not shoemakers, but wounded soldiers, who are able to learn their respective duties in a few hours. The contract at which these shoes are delivered to Government is 6s. 6d. per pair, being at least 2s. less than what was paid previously for an unequal and cobbled article.

However, when the war ended in 1815, manual labour became much cheaper, and the demand for military equipment subsided. As a consequence, Brunel's system was no longer profitable and it soon ceased business.

==== Americas ====
Similar exigencies at the time of the Crimean War stimulated a renewed interest in methods of mechanization and mass-production, which proved longer lasting. A shoemaker in Leicester, Tomas Crick, patented the design for a riveting machine in 1853. His machine used an iron plate to push iron rivets into the sole. The process greatly increased the speed and efficiency of production. He also introduced the use of steam-powered rolling-machines for hardening leather and cutting-machines, in the mid-1850s.

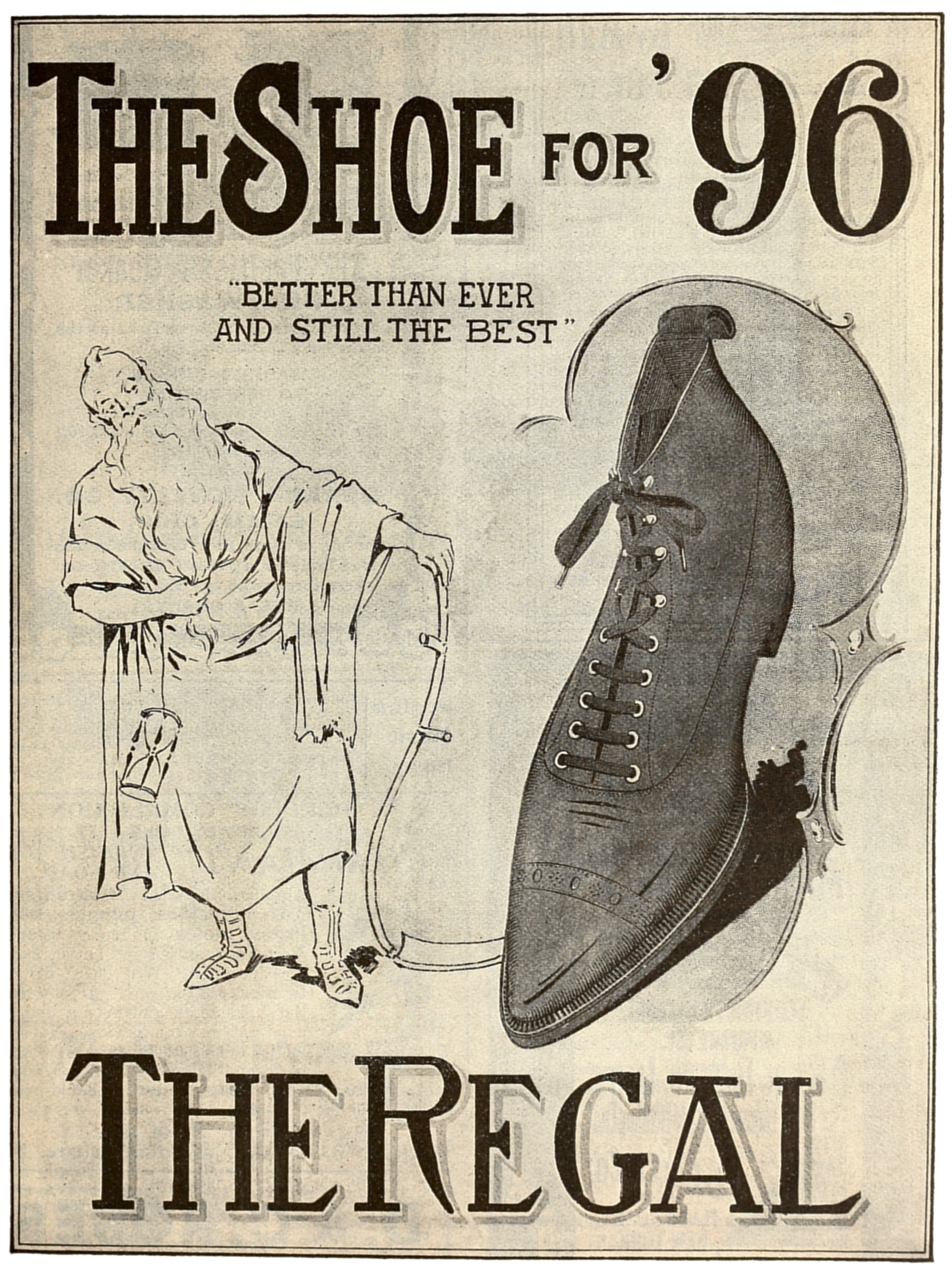
Advertisement in an 1896 issue of McClure's for "The Regal".

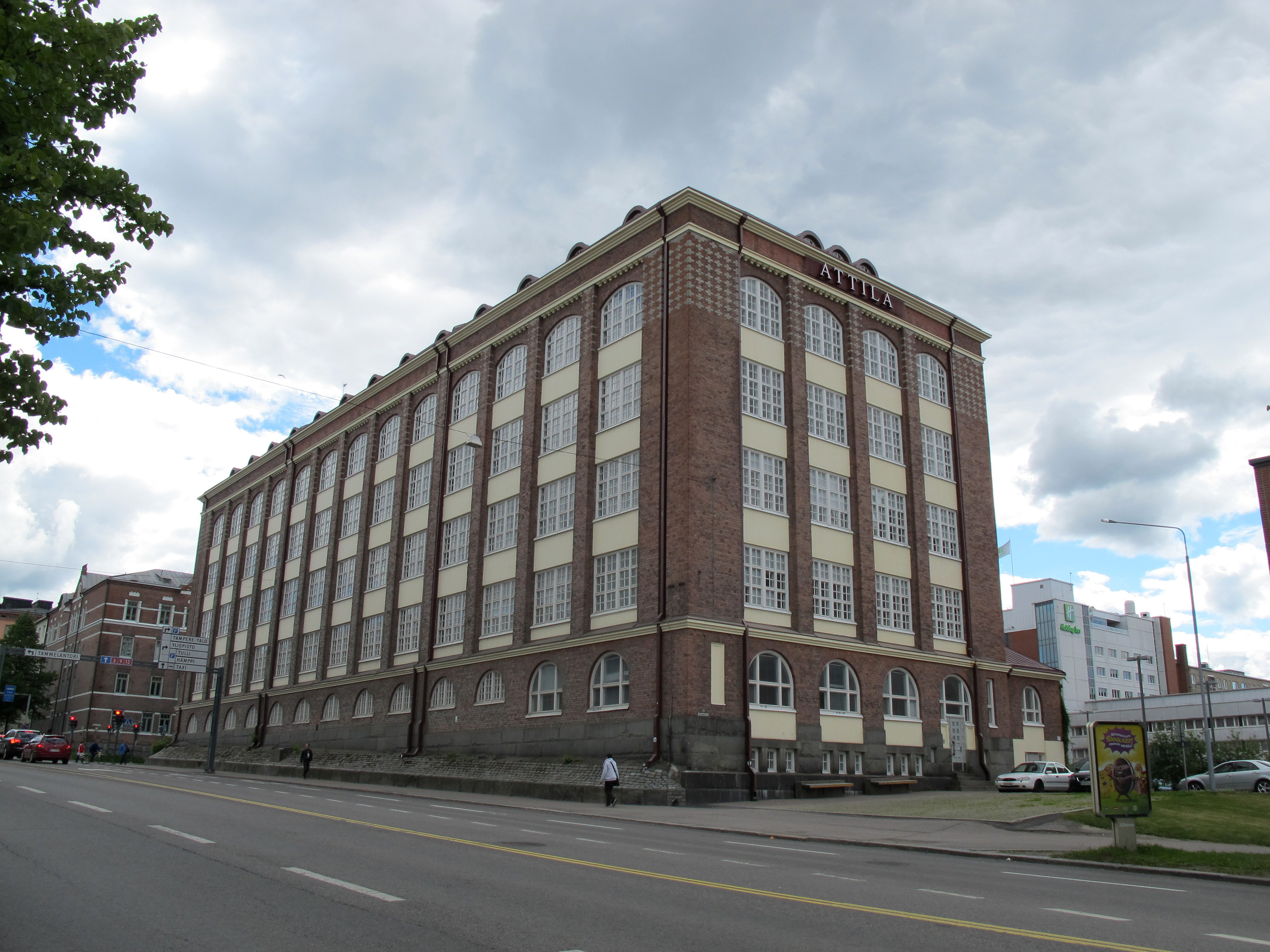
Attila, a former shoe factory from the 1910s in Tampere, Finland

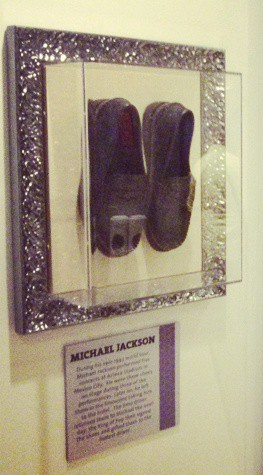
Michael Jackson’s shoes

The sewing machine was introduced in 1846, and provided an alternative method for the mechanization of shoemaking. By the late 1850s, the industry was beginning to shift towards the modern factory, mainly in the US and areas of England. A shoe-stitching machine was invented by the American Lyman Blake in 1856 and perfected by 1864. Entering into a partnership with McKay, his device became known as the McKay stitching machine and was quickly adopted by manufacturers throughout New England. As bottlenecks opened up in the production line due to these innovations, more and more of the manufacturing stages, such as pegging and finishing, became automated. By the 1890s, the process of mechanisation was largely complete.

On January 24, 1899, Humphrey O'Sullivan of Lowell, Massachusetts, was awarded a patent for a rubber heel for boots and shoes. By the 20th century, the United States had become the largest manufacturer of shoes worldwide.

==== Globalization ====
In 1910, the AGO system of stitchless, glued shoes was developed. Since the mid-20th century, advances in rubber, plastics, synthetic cloth, and industrial adhesives have allowed manufacturers to create shoes that stray considerably from traditional crafting techniques. Leather, which had been the primary material in earlier styles, has remained standard in expensive dress shoes, but athletic shoes often have little or no real leather. Soles, which were once laboriously hand-stitched on, are now more often machine stitched or simply glued on. Many of these newer materials, such as rubber and plastics, have made shoes less biodegradable. It is estimated that most mass-produced shoes require 1000 years to degrade in a landfill. In the late 2000s, some shoemakers picked up on the issue and began to produce shoes made entirely from degradable materials, such as the Nike Considered.

As a result of globalization, share of shoe imports in the United States rose from 4% in 1960 to 89% by 1995. In the Philippines, the town of Marikina produced 70% of the shoes sold domestically in the 1970s and 1980s, but after the country joined the World Trade Organization in 1995 for the economy's liberalization, a large influx of cheaply-produced shoes from China, Taiwan and other Asian countries made a sizable negative effect on its shoe industry.

In 2007, the global shoe industry had an overall market of $107.4 billion, in terms of revenue, and is expected to grow to $122.9 billion by the end of 2012. Shoe manufacturers in the People's Republic of China account for 63% of production, 40.5% of global exports and 55% of industry revenue. However, many manufacturers in Europe dominate the higher-priced, higher value-added end of the market.

=== Culture and folklore ===
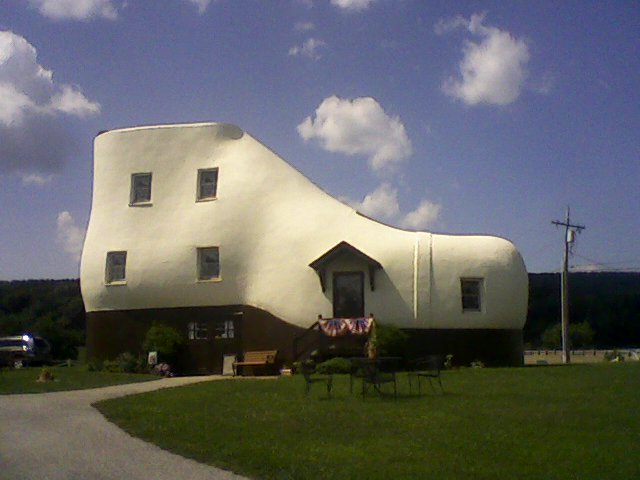
Haines Shoe House in Hallam, Pennsylvania

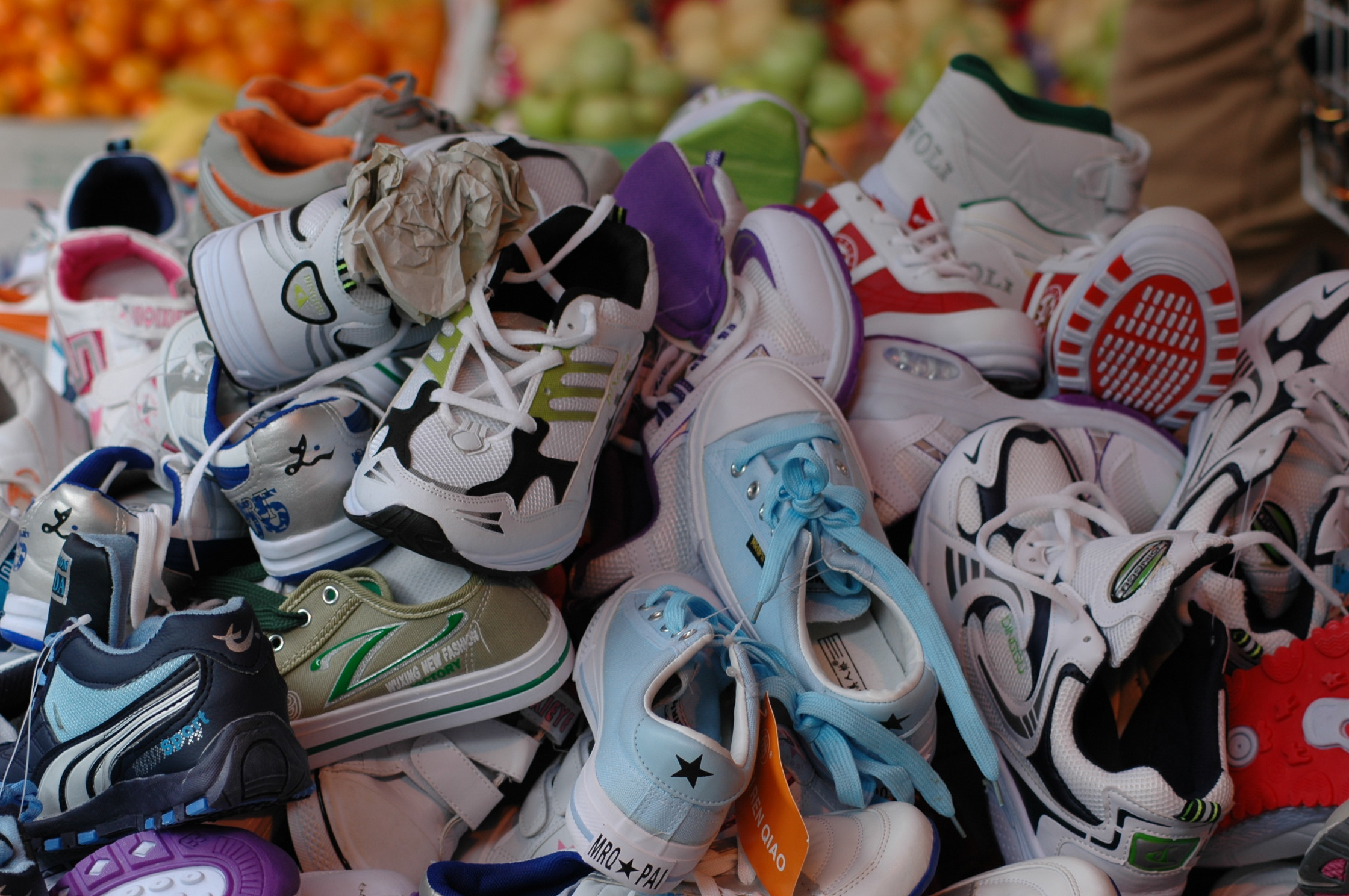
Sports shoes in Hong Kong

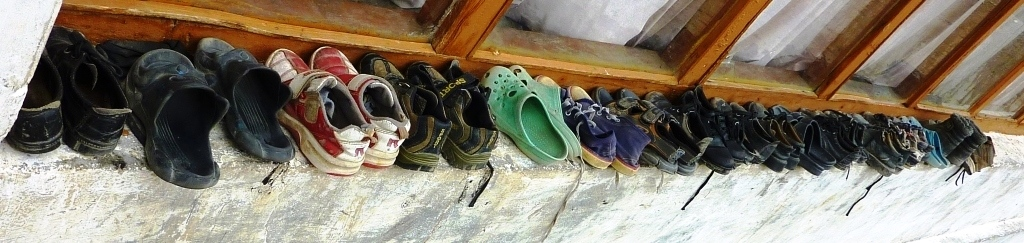
Children's shoes at school in Ladakh

As an integral part of human culture and civilization, shoes have found their way into culture, folklore, and art. A popular 18th-century nursery rhyme is There was an Old Woman Who Lived in a Shoe. In 1948, Mahlon Haines, a shoe salesman in Hallam, Pennsylvania, built an actual house shaped like a work boot as a form of advertisement; the Haines Shoe House still stands today and is a popular roadside attraction.

Shoes also play an important role in the fairy tales Cinderella and The Red Shoes. In the movie adaption of the children's book The Wonderful Wizard of Oz, a pair of red ruby slippers play a key role in the plot. The 1985 comedy The Man with One Red Shoe features an eccentric man wearing one normal business shoe and one red shoe that becomes central to the plot.

Athletic sneaker collection has also existed as a part of urban subculture in the United States for several decades. Recent decades have seen this trend spread to European nations such as the Czech Republic. A Sneakerhead is a person who owns multiple pairs of shoes as a form of collection and fashion.

In the Bible's Old Testament, the shoe is used to symbolize something that is worthless or of little value. In the New Testament, the act of removing one's shoes symbolizes servitude. Ancient Semitic-speaking peoples regarded the act of removing their shoes as a mark of reverence when approaching a sacred person or place. The removal of the shoe also symbolizes the act of giving up a legal right. In Hebrew custom, if a man chose not to marry his childless brother's widow, the widow removed her brother-in-law's shoe to symbolize that he had abandoned his duty. In Arab custom, the removal of one's shoe also symbolized the dissolution of marriage.

In Arab culture, showing the sole of one's shoe is considered an insult, and to throw a shoe and hit someone with it is considered an even greater insult. Shoes are considered to be dirty as they frequently touch the ground, and are associated with the lowest part of the body—the foot. As such, shoes are forbidden in mosques, and it is also considered unmannerly to cross the legs and display the soles of one's shoes during conversation. This insult was demonstrated in Iraq, first when Saddam Hussein's statue was toppled in 2003, Iraqis gathered around it and struck the statue with their shoes. In 2008, United States President George W. Bush had a shoe thrown at him by a journalist as a statement against the war in Iraq. More generally, shoe-throwing or shoeing, showing the sole of one's shoe or using shoes to insult are forms of protest in many parts of the world.

Empty shoes may also symbolize death. In Greek culture, empty shoes are the equivalent of the American funeral wreath. For example, empty shoes placed outside of a Greek home would tell others that the family's son has died in battle. The Shoes on the Danube Bank is a memorial in Budapest, Hungary, to honor the Jews who were killed by fascist Arrow Cross militiamen in Budapest during World War II.

== Construction ==
The basic anatomy of a shoe is recognizable, regardless of the specific style of footwear.

=== Sole ===
All shoes have a sole, which is the bottom of a shoe, in contact with the ground. Soles can be made from a variety of materials, although most modern shoes have soles made from natural rubber, polyurethane, or polyvinyl chloride (PVC) compounds. Soles can be simple—a single material in a single layer—or they can be complex, with multiple structures or layers and materials. When various layers are used, soles may consist of an insole, midsole, and an outsole.

=== Insole ===
The insole is the interior bottom of a shoe, which sits directly beneath the foot under the footbed (also known as sock liner). The purpose of the insole is to attach to the lasting margin of the upper, which is wrapped around the last during the closing of the shoe during the lasting operation. Insoles are usually made of cellulosic paper board or synthetic non woven insole board. Many shoes have removable and replaceable footbeds. Extra cushioning is often added for comfort (to control the shape, moisture, or smell of the shoe) or health reasons (to help deal with differences in the natural shape of the foot or positioning of the foot during standing or walking).

=== Outsole ===
The outsole is the layer in direct contact with the ground. Dress shoes often have leather or resin rubber outsoles; casual or work-oriented shoes have outsoles made of natural rubber or a synthetic material like polyurethane. The outsole may comprise a single piece or may be an assembly of separate pieces, often of different materials. On some shoes, the heel of the sole has a rubber plate for durability and traction, while the front is leather for style. Specialized shoes will often have modifications on this design: athletic or so-called cleated shoes like soccer, rugby, baseball and golf shoes have spikes embedded in the outsole to improve traction.

=== Midsole ===
The midsole is the layer in between the outsole and the insole, typically there for shock absorption. Some types of shoes, like running shoes, have additional material for shock absorption, usually beneath the heel of the foot, where one puts the most pressure down. Some shoes may not have a midsole at all.

=== Heel ===
The heel is the bottom rear part of a shoe which rests below the heel bone. Its function is to support the heel of the foot. They are often made of the same material as the sole of the shoe. This part can be high for fashion or to make the person look taller, or flat for more practical and comfortable use. On some shoes the inner forward point of the heel is chiselled off, a feature known as a "gentleman's corner". This piece of design is intended to alleviate the problem of the points catching the bottom of trousers and was first observed in the 1930s. High-heeled shoes, also known as high heels (colloquially shortened to heels), are a type of shoe with an upward-angled sole. The heel in such shoes is raised above the ball of the foot. High heels cause the legs to appear longer, make the wearer appear taller, and accentuate the calf muscle.

=== Upper ===
The upper helps hold the shoe onto the foot. In the simplest cases, such as sandals or flip-flops, this may be nothing more than a few straps for holding the sole in place. Closed footwear, such as boots, trainers and most men's shoes, will have a more complex upper. This part is often decorated or is made in a certain style to look attractive. The upper is connected to the sole by a strip of leather, rubber, or plastic that is stitched between it and the sole, known as a welt.

Most uppers have a mechanism, such as laces, straps with buckles, zippers, elastic, velcro straps, buttons, or snaps, for tightening the upper on the foot. Uppers with laces usually have a tongue that helps seal the laced opening and protect the foot from abrasion by the laces. Uppers with laces also have eyelets or hooks to make it easier to tighten and loosen the laces and to prevent the lace from tearing through the upper material. An aglet is the protective wrapping on the end of the lace.

=== Vamp ===
The vamp is the front part of the shoe, starting behind the toe, extending around the eyelets and tongue and towards back part of the shoe.

=== Medial ===
The medial is the part of the shoe closest to a person's center of symmetry, and the lateral is on the opposite side, away from their center of symmetry. This can be in reference to either the outsole or the vamp. Most shoes have shoelaces on the upper, connecting the medial and lateral parts after one puts their shoes on and aiding in keeping their shoes on their feet. In 1968, Puma SE introduced the first pair of sneakers with Velcro straps in lieu of shoelaces, and these became popular by the 1980s, especially among children and the elderly.

The toe box is the part that covers and protects the toes. People with toe deformities, or individuals who experience toe swelling (such as long-distance runners) usually require a larger toe box.

Diagram of a typical dress shoe. The area labeled as the "Lace guard" is sometimes considered part of the quarter and sometimes part of the vamp.

A shoemaker making turnshoes at the Roscheider Hof Open Air Museum. English subtitles.

Cutaway view of a typical shoe.

== Types ==
Most types of shoes are designed for specific activities. For example, boots are typically designed for work or heavy outdoor use. Athletic shoes are designed for particular sports such as running or walking. Some shoes are designed to be worn at more formal occasions, and others are designed for casual wear. There are also a vast variety of shoes designed for different types of dancing. Orthopedic shoes are special types of footwear designed for individuals with particular foot problems or special needs. Clinicians evaluate patient's footwear as a part of their clinical examination. However, it is often based on each individual's needs, with attention to the choice of footwear worn and if the shoe is adequate for the purpose of completing their activities of daily living. Other animals, such as dogs and horses, may also wear special shoes to protect their feet as well.

Depending on the activity for which they are designed, some types of footwear may fit into multiple categories. For example, Cowboy boots are considered boots, but may also be worn in more formal occasions and used as dress shoes. Hiking boots incorporate many of the protective features of boots, but also provide the extra flexibility and comfort of many athletic shoes. Flip-flops are considered casual footwear, but have also been worn in formal occasions, such as visits to the White House.

=== Athletic ===
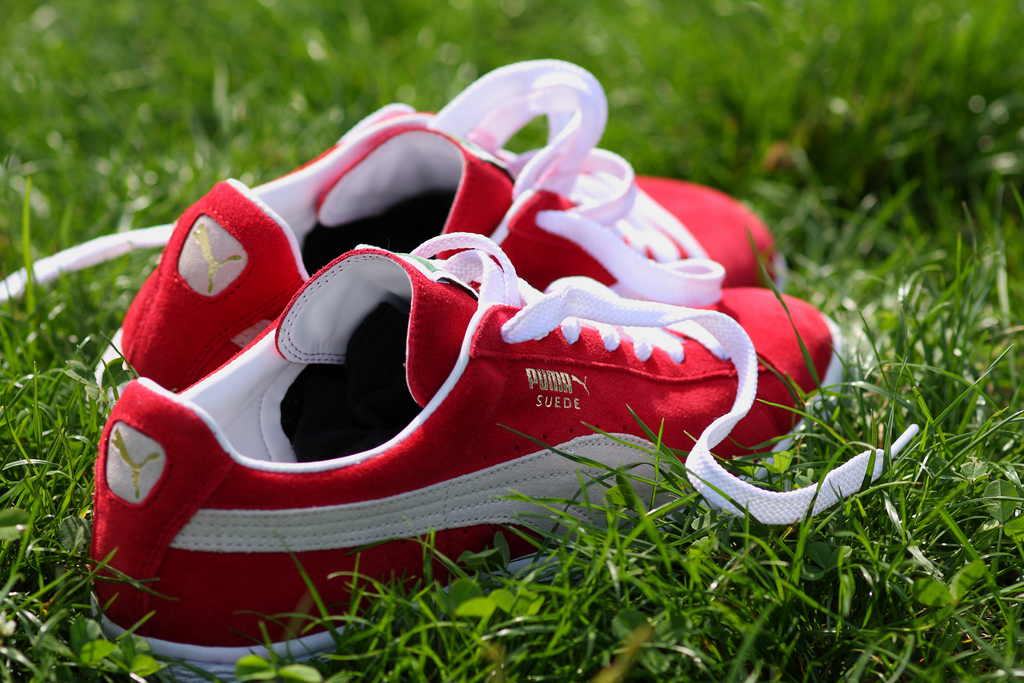
A pair of athletic running shoes

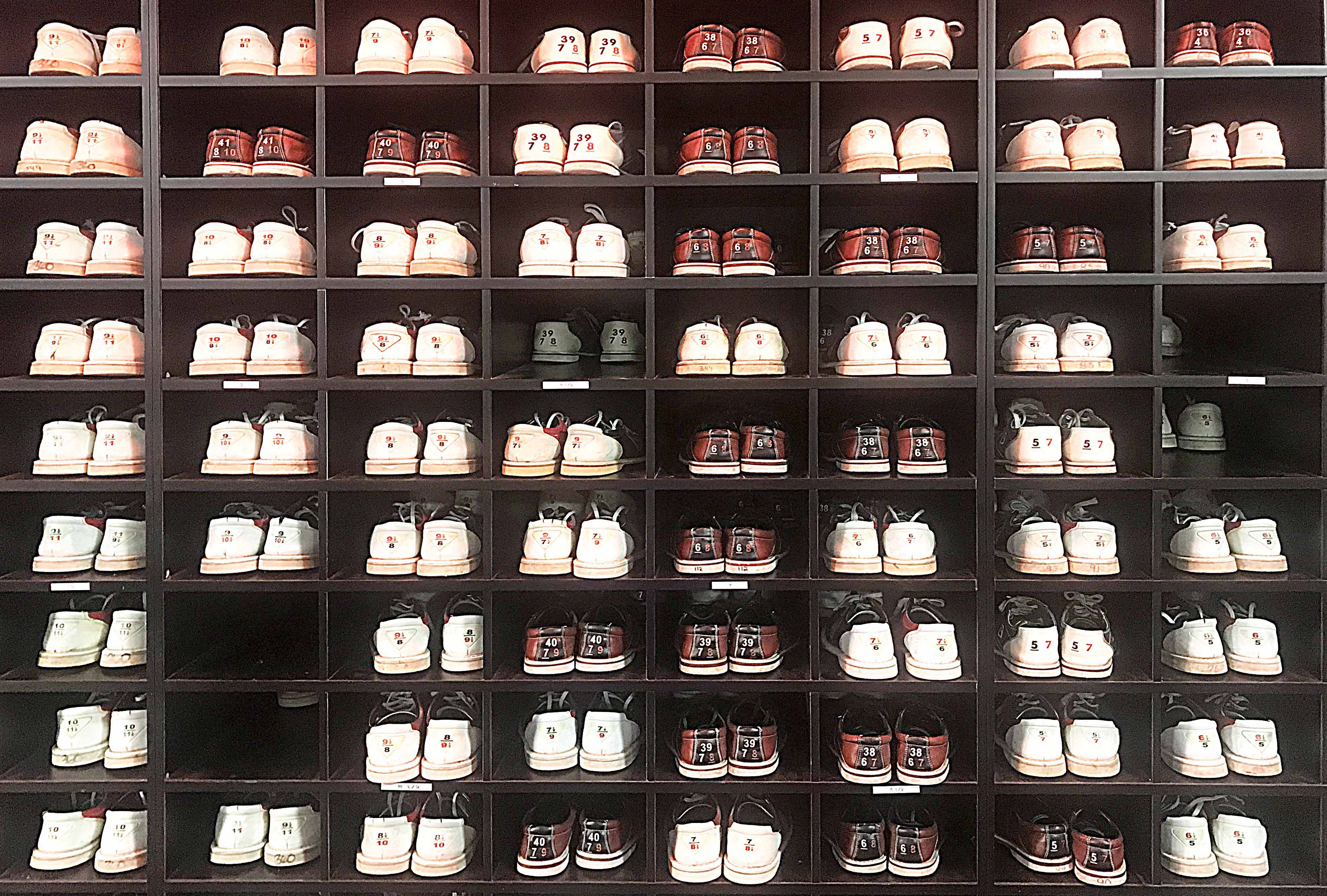
Bowling centers maintain bowling shoes for rental to patrons, to prevent damage to lane approaches.

Athletic shoes are designed for various sports activities, focusing on maximizing friction between the foot and the ground. These shoes often utilize materials like rubber to achieve this purpose. The earliest athletic shoes, dating to the mid-19th century, were track spikes with metal cleats for increased traction. Over time, athletic shoe design evolved, with companies like Reebok and Adidas contributing to the development of modern athletic shoes. Notable innovations include rubber-soled athletic shoes and the introduction of specialized shoes for different sports, such as basketball and golf. More recently, minimalist shoes have gained popularity as barefoot running became popular by the late 20th and early 21st century, maintaining optimum flexibility and natural walking while also providing some degree of protection. Their purpose is to allow one's feet and legs to feel more subtly the impacts and forces involved in running, allowing finer adjustments in running style.

The earliest rubber-soled athletic shoes date back to 1876 in the United Kingdom, when the New Liverpool Rubber Company made plimsolls, or sandshoes, designed for the sport of croquet. Similar rubber-soled shoes were made in 1892 in the United States by Humphrey O'Sullivan, based on Charles Goodyear's technology. The United States Rubber Company was founded the same year and produced rubber-soled and heeled shoes under a variety of brand names, which were later consolidated in 1916 under the name, Keds. These shoes became known as, "sneakers", because the rubber sole allowed the wearer to sneak up on another person. In 1964, the founding of Nike by Phil Knight and Bill Bowerman of the University of Oregon introduced many new improvements common in modern running shoes, such as rubber waffle soles, breathable nylon uppers, and cushioning in the mid-sole and heel. During the 1970s, the expertise of podiatrists also became important in athletic shoe design, to implement new design features based on how feet reacted to specific actions, such as running, jumping, or side-to-side movement for men and women.

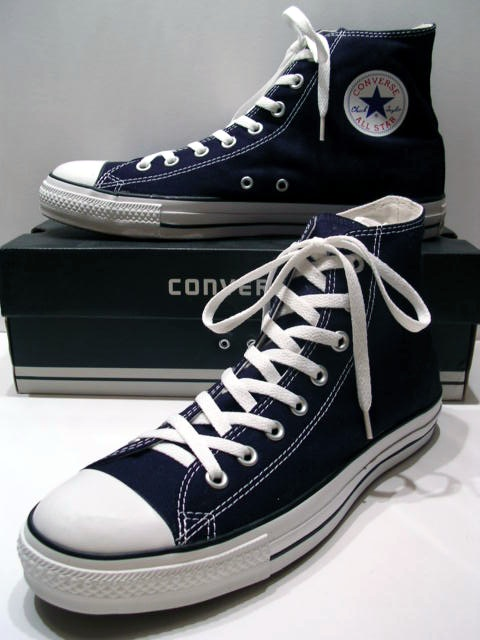
A pair of Converse All-Stars

Shoes specific to the sport of basketball were developed by Chuck Taylor, and are popularly known as Chuck Taylor All-Stars. In 1969, Taylor was inducted into the Naismith Memorial Basketball Hall of Fame in recognition of this development, and in the 1970s, other shoe manufacturers, such as Nike, Adidas, Reebok, and others began imitating this style of athletic shoe. In April 1985, Nike introduced its own brand of basketball shoe which would become popular in its own right, the Air Jordan, named after the then-rookie Chicago Bulls basketball player, Michael Jordan. The Air Jordan line of shoes sold $100 million in their first year.

As barefoot running became popular by the late 20th and early 21st century, many modern shoe manufacturers have recently designed footwear that mimic this experience, maintaining optimum flexibility and natural walking while also providing some degree of protection. Some of these shoes include the Vibram FiveFingers, Nike Free, and Saucony's Kinvara and Hattori. Mexican huaraches are also very simple running shoes, similar to the shoes worn by the Tarahumara people of northern Mexico, who are known for their distance running abilities. Wrestling shoes are also very light and flexible shoes that are designed to mimic bare feet while providing additional traction and protection.

Many athletic shoes are designed with specific features for specific activities. One of these includes roller skates, which have metal or plastic wheels on the bottom specific for the sport of roller skating. Similarly, ice skates have a metal blade attached to the bottom for locomotion across ice. Skate shoes have also been designed to provide a comfortable, flexible and durable shoe for the sport of skateboarding. Climbing shoes are rubber-soled, tight-fitting shoes designed to fit in the small cracks and crevices for rock climbing. Cycling shoes are similarly designed with rubber soles and a tight fit, but also are equipped with a metal or plastic cleat to interface with clipless pedals, as well as a stiff sole to maximize power transfer and support the foot. Some shoes are made specifically to improve a person's ability to weight train. Sneakers that are a mix between an activity-centered and a more standard design have also been produced: examples include roller shoes, which feature wheels that can be used to roll on hard ground, and Soap shoes, which feature a hard plastic sole that can be used for grinding.

=== Boot ===
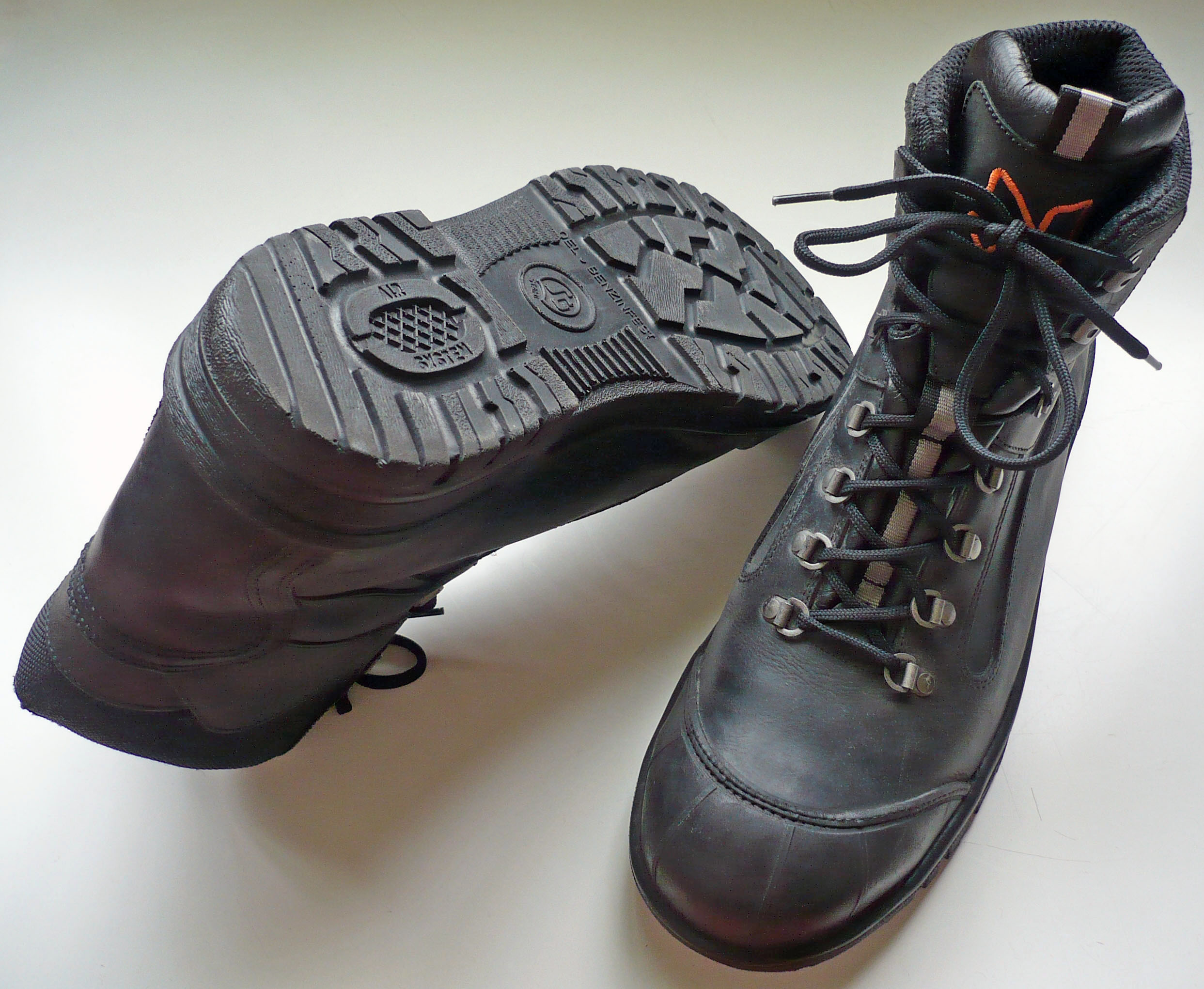
A pair of steel-toed safety boots

Boots are a specialized type of footwear that covers the foot and extends up the leg. They serve both functional and fashion purposes, offering protection from elements like water, snow, and mud while also being a fashion statement.

Cowboy boots, for instance, are known for their distinctive style and are popular among cowboys in the western United States. Hiking boots, on the other hand, are designed for comfort and support during long walks in rough terrains. Snow boots are ideal for wet or snowy weather, providing warmth and protection against the elements. Additionally, boots are used in specialized activities like skiing, ice skating, and climbing due to their unique features tailored to these activities.

Boots may also be attached to snowshoes to increase the distribution of weight over a larger surface area for walking in snow. Ski boots are a specialized snow boot which are used in alpine or cross-country skiing and designed to provide a way to attach the skier to his/her skis using ski bindings. The ski/boot/binding combination is used to effectively transmit control inputs from the skier's legs to the snow. Ice skates are another specialized boot with a metal blade attached to the bottom which is used to propel the wearer across a sheet of ice. Inline skates are similar to ice skates but with a set of three to four wheels in lieu of the blade, which are designed to mimic ice skating on solid surfaces such as wood or concrete.

Boots are designed to withstand heavy wear to protect the wearer and provide good traction. They are generally made from sturdy leather uppers and non-leather outsoles. They may be used for uniforms of the police or military, as well as for protection in industrial settings such as mining and construction. Protective features may include steel-tipped toes and soles or ankle guards.

=== Dress and casual ===
Dress shoes are characterized by their smooth leather uppers, leather soles, and sleek design, suitable for formal occasions. In contrast, casual shoes have sturdier leather uppers, non-leather outsoles, and a wider profile for everyday wear. Some dress shoe designs are unisex, while others are specific to men or women.

==== Men's ====
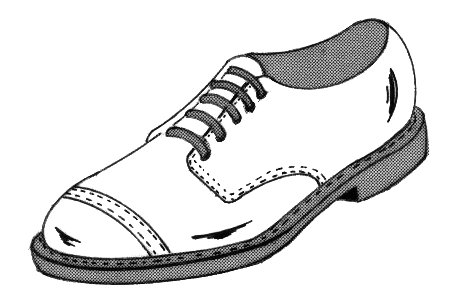
This male dress shoe, known as a derby shoe, is distinguished by its open lacing.

Men's dress shoes include styles like Oxfords, Derbies, Monk-straps, and Slip-ons, each with its unique characteristics in terms of lacing, decoration, and formality.

==== Women's ====
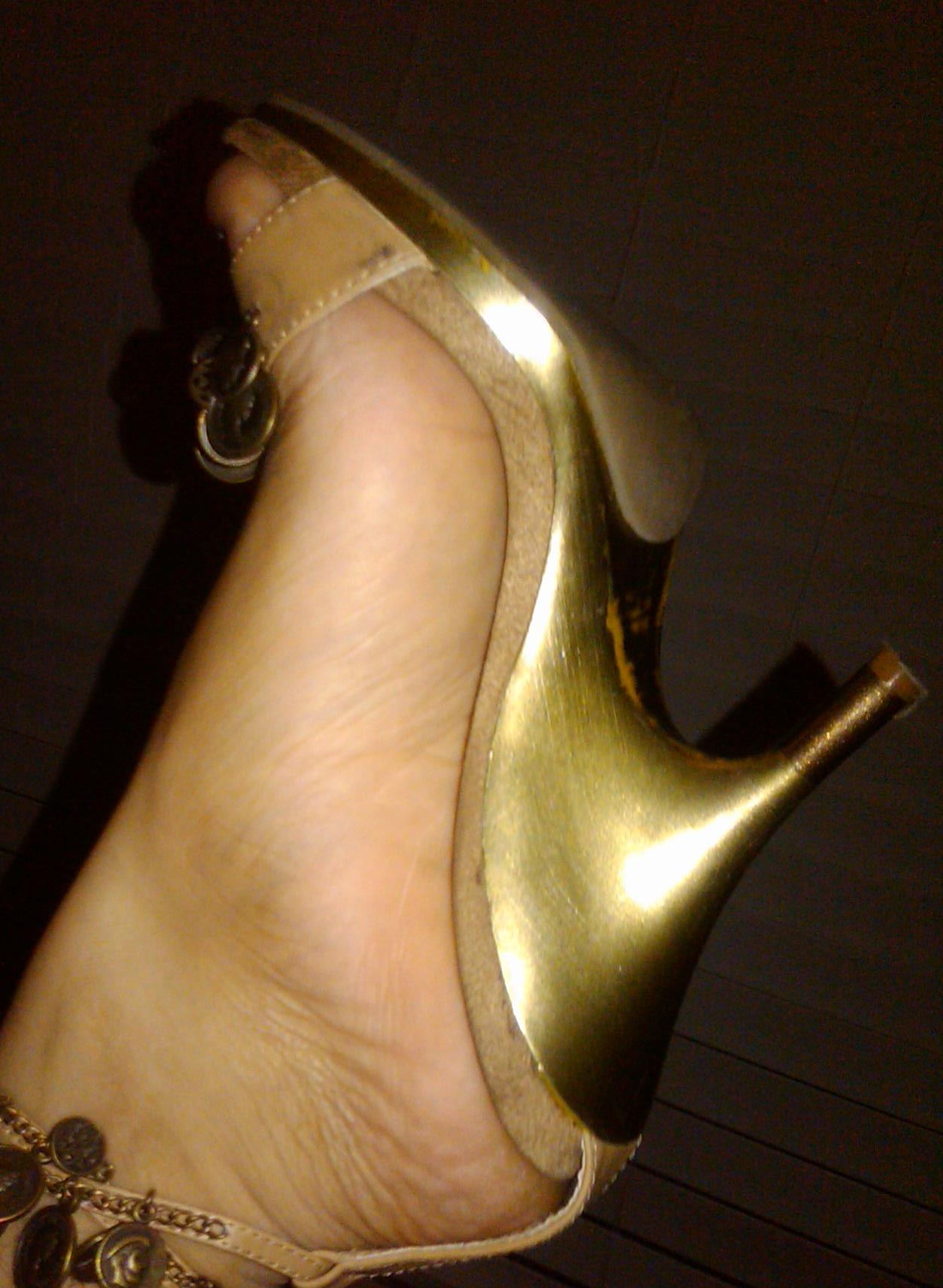
High heel sandals

Women's shoes cover a wide range of styles, including high heels, mules, slingbacks, ballet flats, and court shoes, with high-heeled footwear being a popular choice for formal occasions.

=== Unisex ===
- Clog
- Platform shoe: shoe with very thick soles and heels
- Sandals: open shoes consisting of a sole and various straps, leaving much of the foot exposed to air. They are thus popular for warm-weather wear, because they let the foot be cooler than a closed-toed shoe would.
- Saddle shoe: leather shoe with a contrasting saddle-shaped band over the instep, typically white uppers with black "saddle".
- Slip-on shoe: a dress or casual shoe without shoelaces or fasteners; often with tassels, buckles, or coin-holders (penny loafers).
- Boat shoes, also known as "deck shoes": similar to a loafer, but more casual. Laces are usually simple leather with no frills. Typically made of leather and featuring a soft white sole to avoid marring or scratching a boat deck. The first boat shoe was invented in 1935 by Paul A. Sperry.
- Slippers: For indoor use, commonly worn with pajamas.

=== Dance ===
Dancers use a variety of footwear depending on the style of dance and the surface they will be dancing on. Pointe shoes, for instance, are designed for ballet dancing, featuring a stiffened toe box and hardened sole to allow dancers to stand on the tips of their toes. Ballet shoes, on the other hand, are soft, pliable shoes made of canvas or leather, providing flexibility and comfort for ballet dancing. Other dance shoe types include jazz shoes, tango, and flamenco shoes, ballroom shoes, tap shoes, character shoes, and foot thongs, each designed to meet the specific needs of different dance styles.

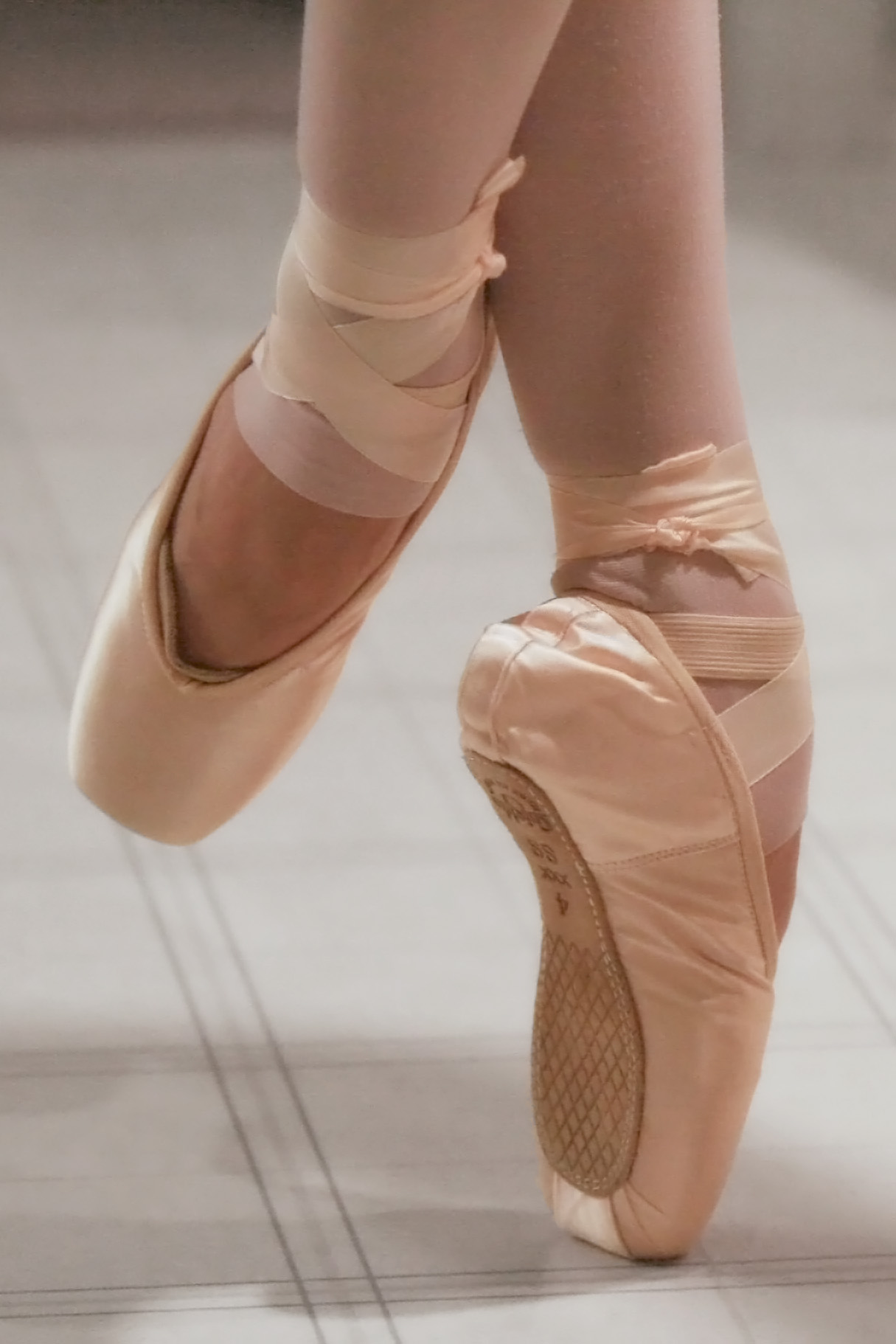
Pointe shoes

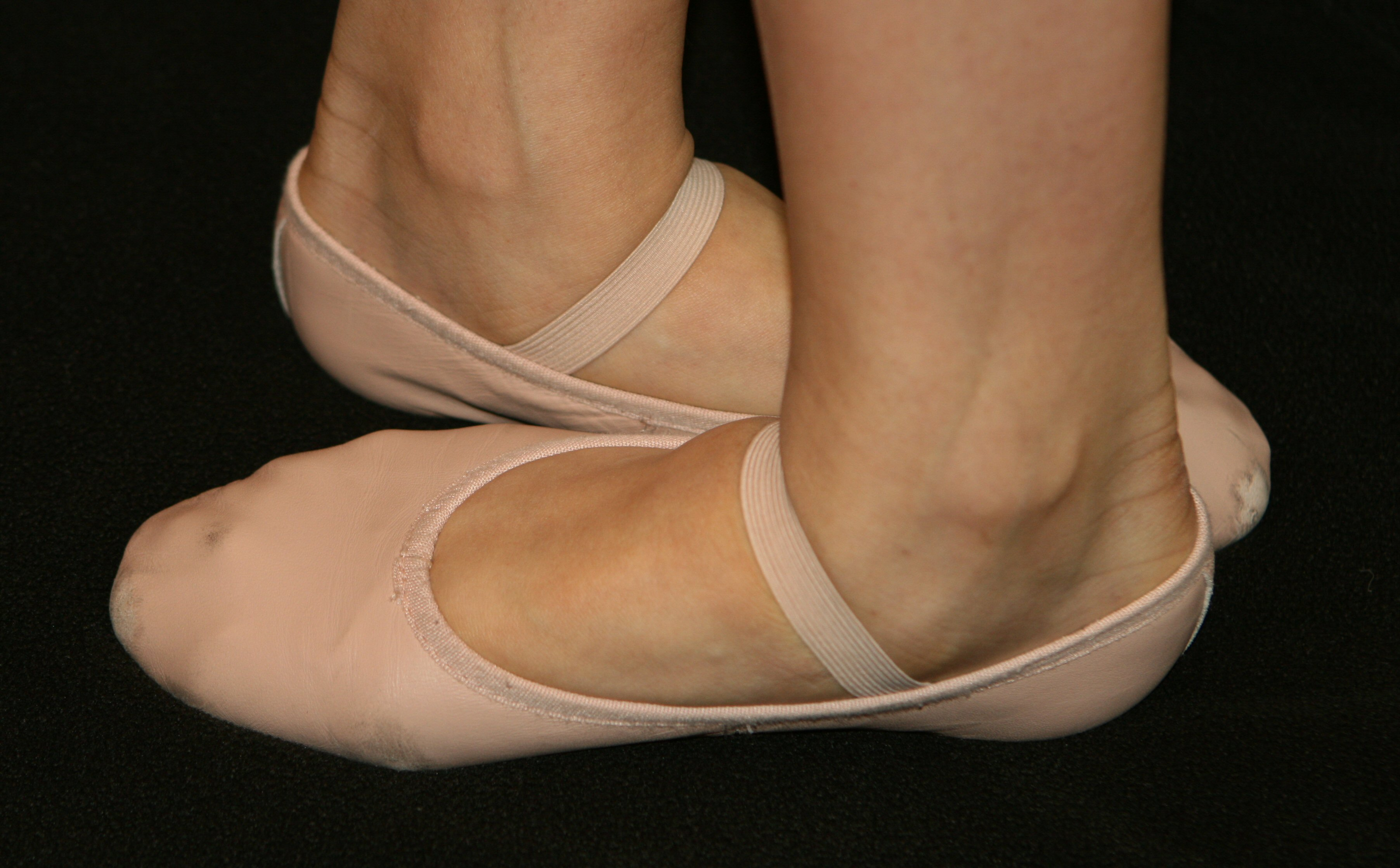
Ballet shoes

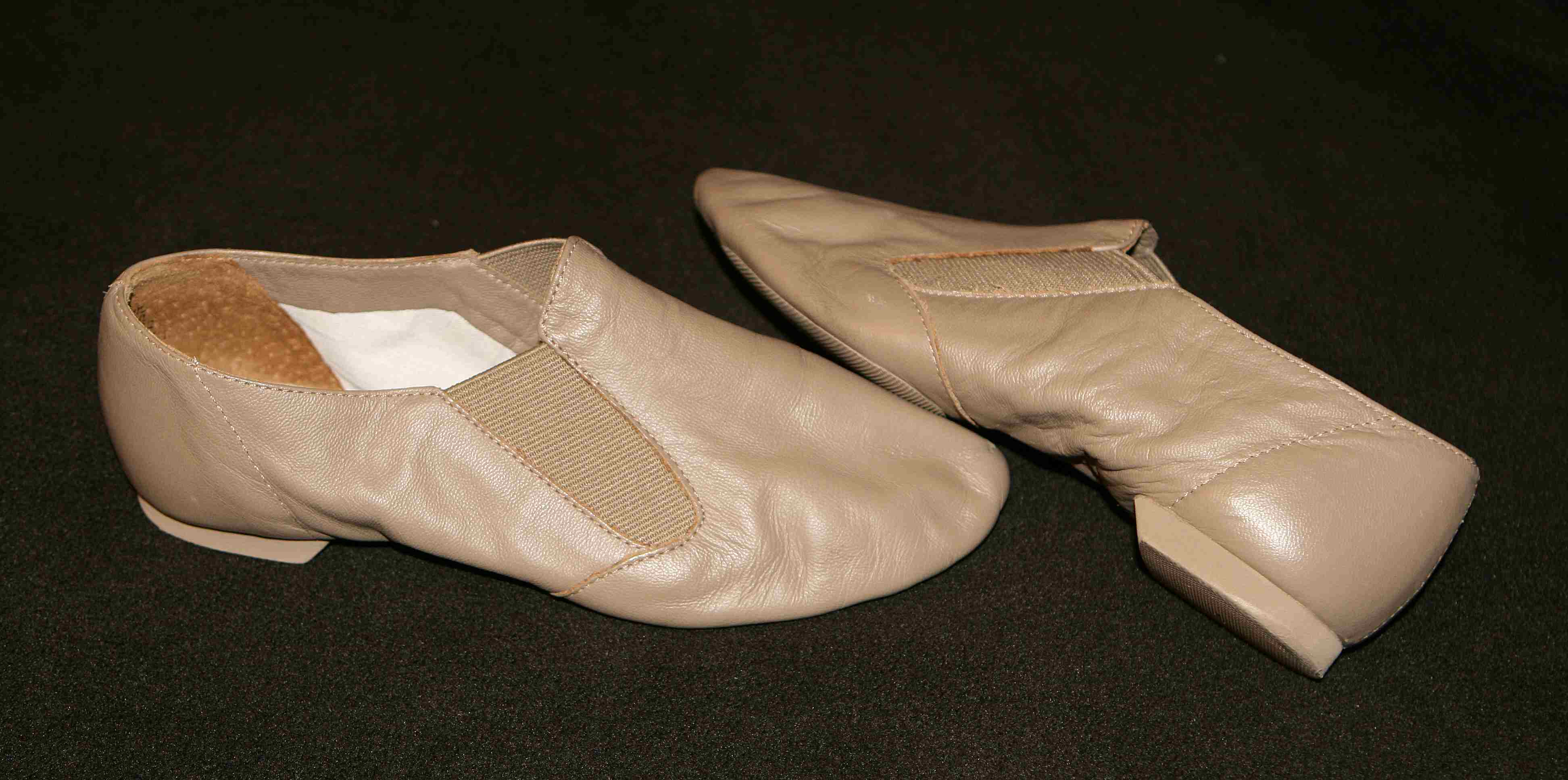
Jazz shoes. This style is frequently worn by acro dancers

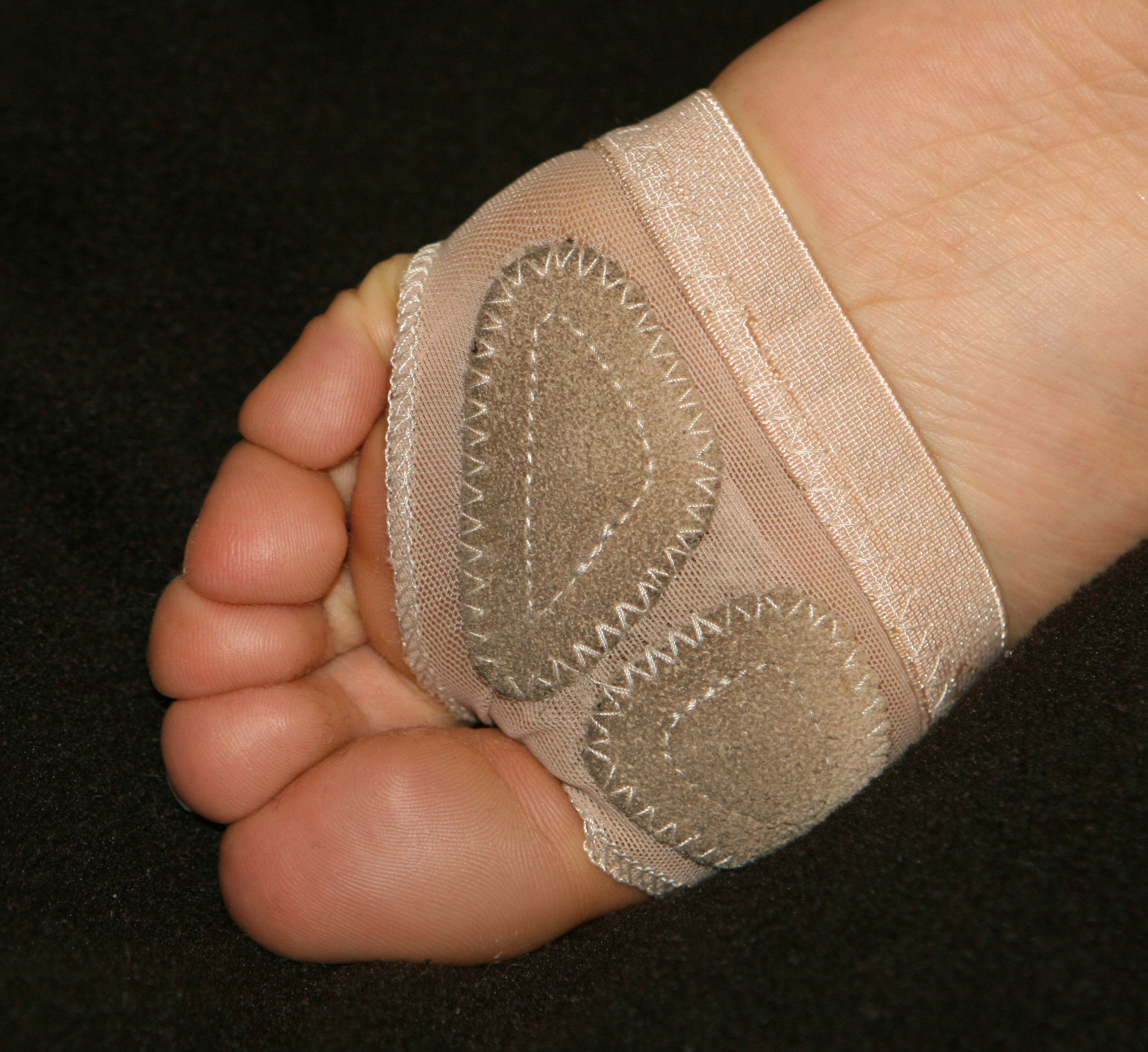
A foot thong, viewed from the bottom

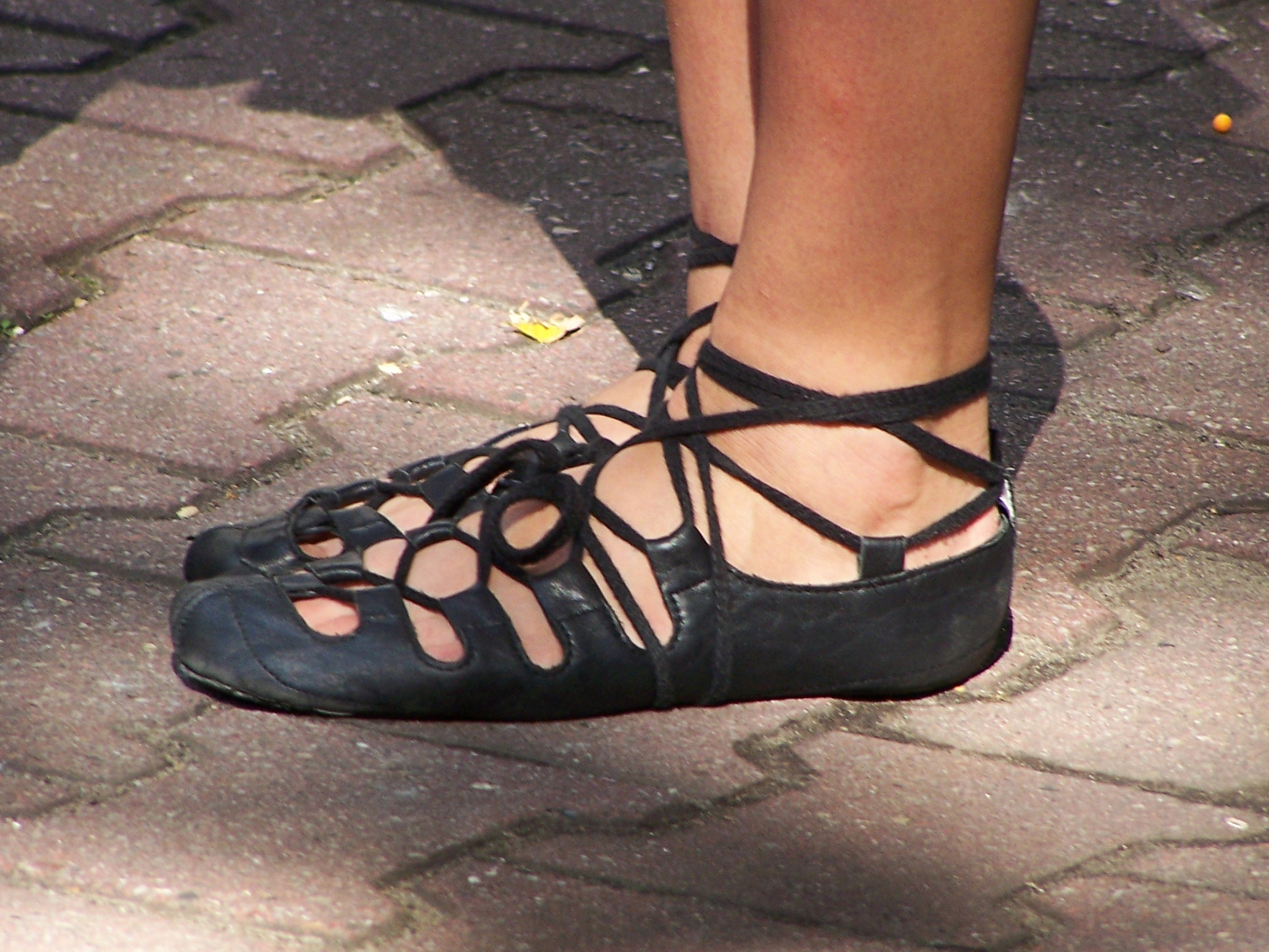
Ghillies

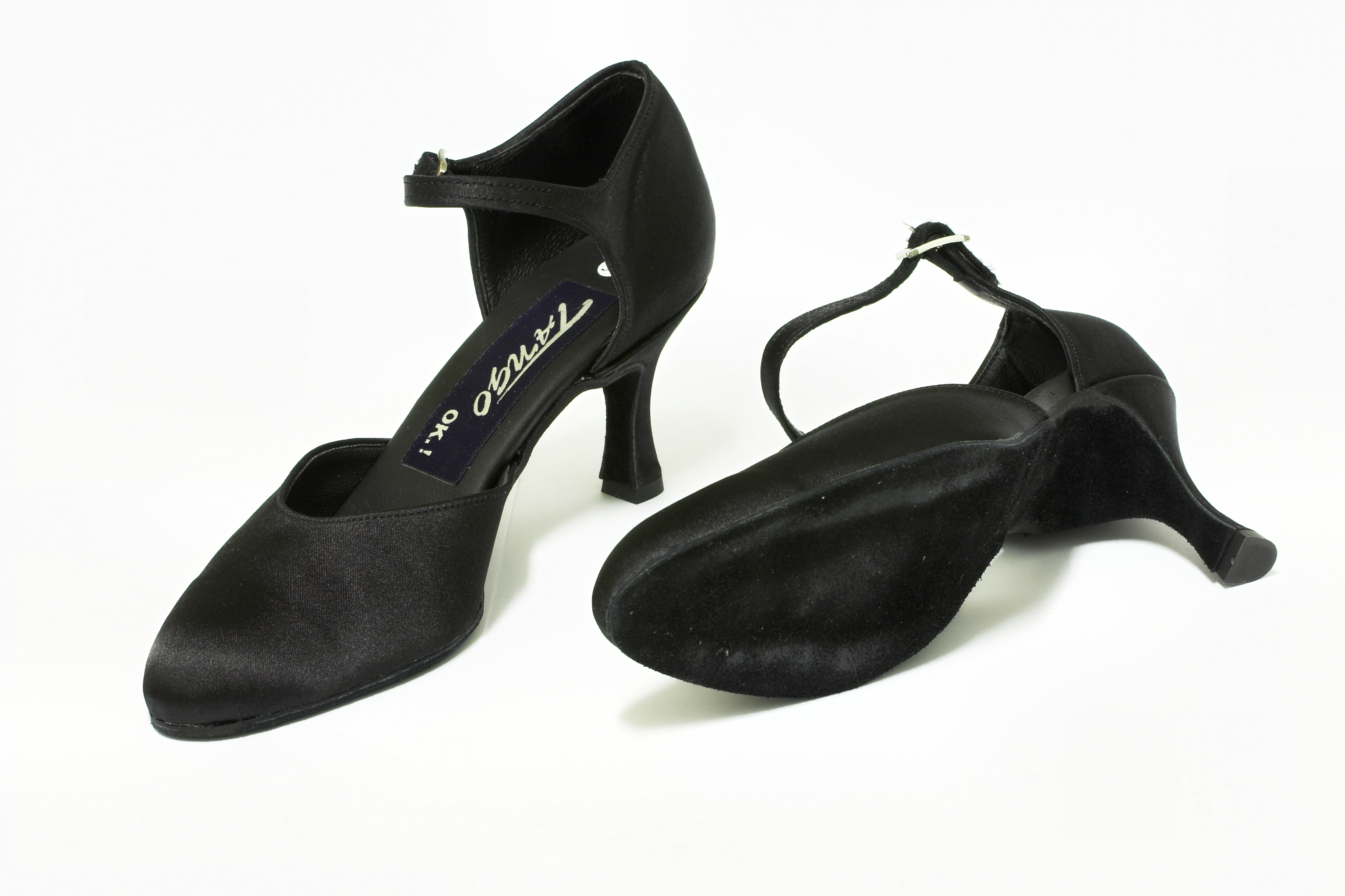
Ladies' ballroom shoes

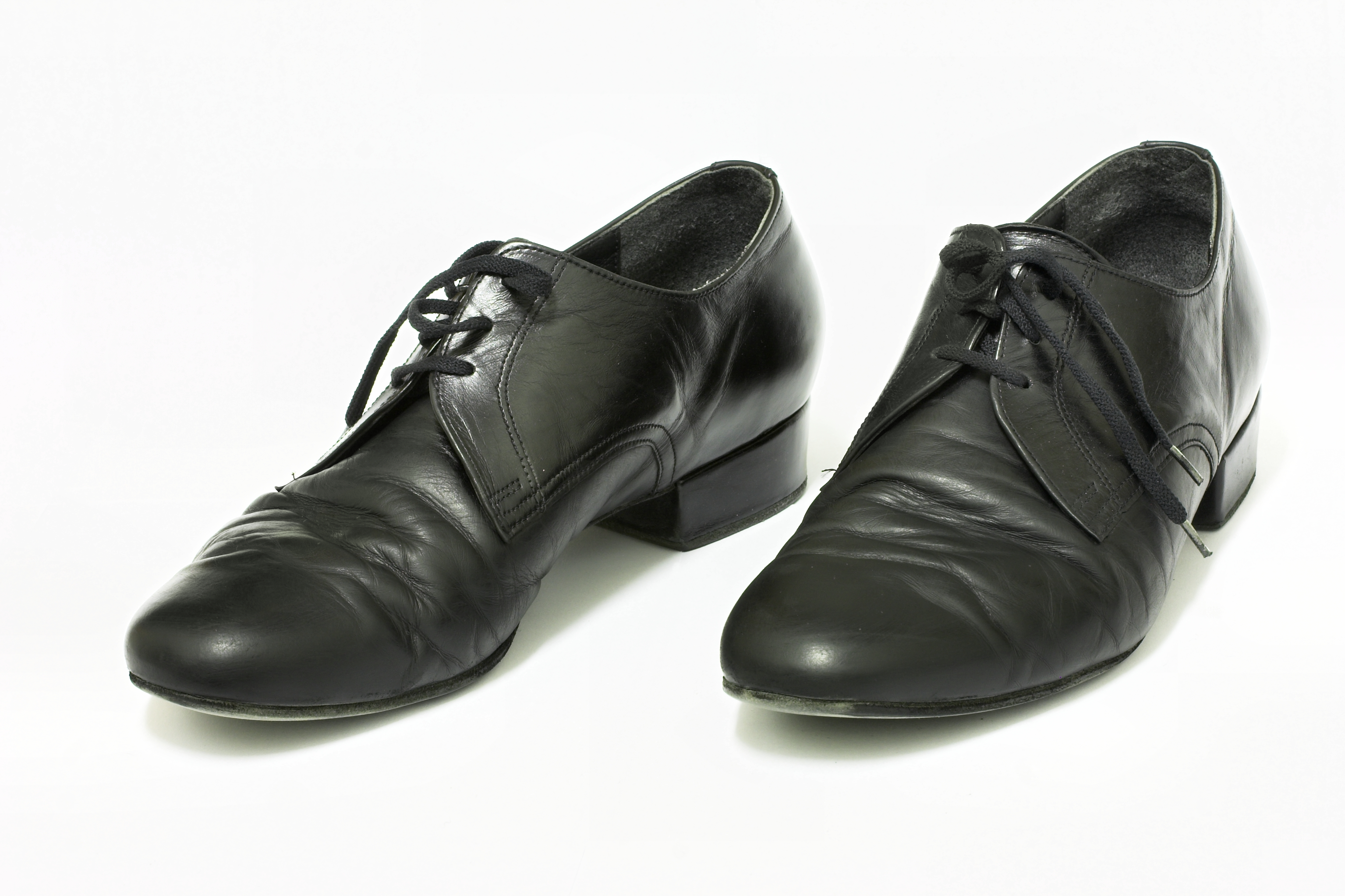
Men's ballroom shoes

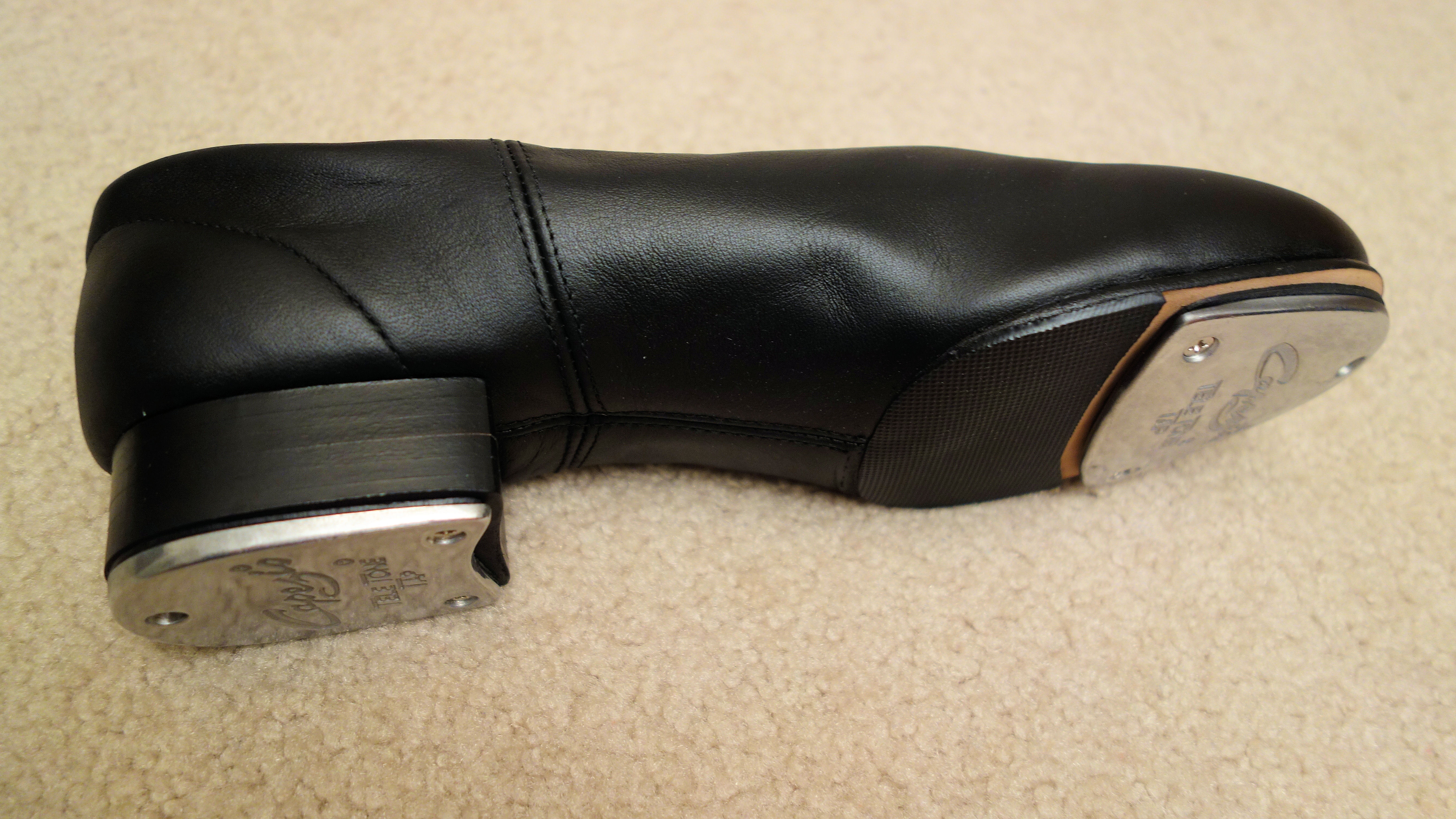
Tap shoes

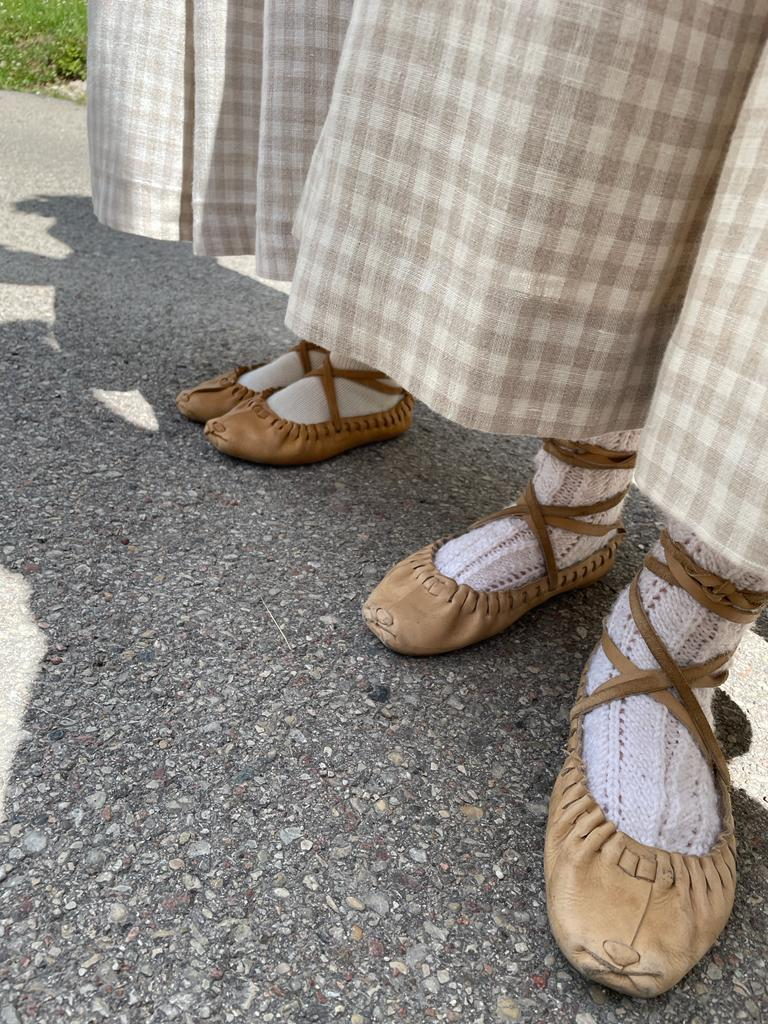
Kierpce

=== Orthopedic ===
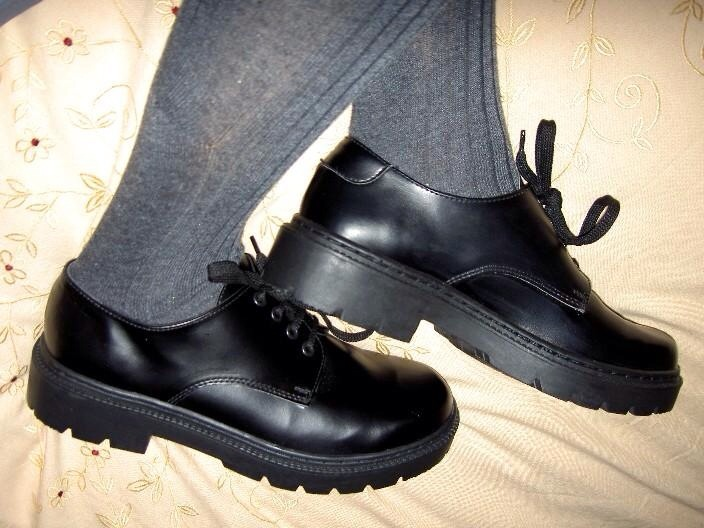
Orthopedic heavy duty black leather school uniform shoes

Orthopedic shoes are specially designed to alleviate discomfort associated with various foot and ankle disorders, such as blisters, bunions, calluses, and plantar fasciitis. They are also used by individuals with diabetes, unequal leg length, or children with mobility issues. These shoes typically feature a low heel, wide toe box, and firm heel for added support. Some orthopedic shoes come with removable insoles or orthotics to provide extra arch support.

== Measures and sizes ==
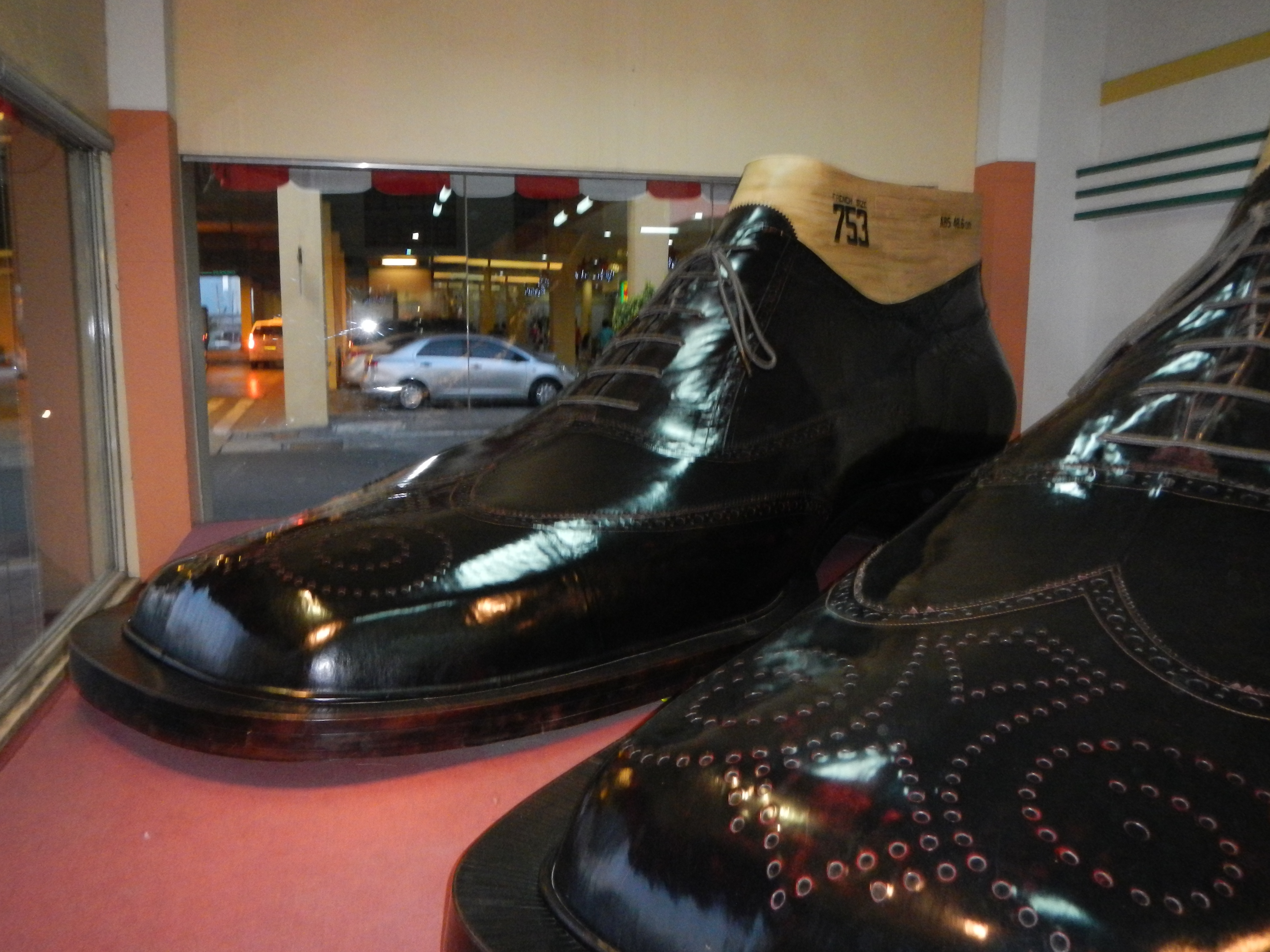
World's largest pair of shoes, Riverbank Center, Philippines—5.29 metres (17.4 ft) long and 2.37 metres (7 ft 9 in) wide, equivalent to a French shoe size of 75.

Shoe sizes are indicated by a numerical value representing the length of the shoe, with different systems used globally. European sizes are measured in Paris Points, while the UK and American units are based on whole-number sizes spaced at one barleycorn (1/3 inch) with UK adult sizes starting at size 1 = 8 2/3 in (22.0 cm). In the US, this is size 2. Men's and women's shoe sizes often use different scales, and some systems are measured using a Brannock Device which considers the width and length size values of the feet. The Mondopoint system, introduced in the 1970s by International Standard ISO 2816:1973 "Fundamental characteristics of a system of shoe sizing to be known as Mondopoint" and ISO 3355:1975 "Shoe sizes – System of length grading (for use in the Mondopoint system)" includes measurements of both length and width of the foot.

Toddler-sized shoe.

== Accessories ==
Various accessories are used to enhance the functionality and comfort of shoes. Crampons provide traction on icy terrain, foam taps adjust shoe fit, heel grips prevent slipping, and ice cleats enhance stability on slippery surfaces. Overshoes protect shoes from rain and snow, while shoe bags are used for storage. Shoe brushes and polishing cloths maintain shoe appearance, while shoe inserts offer additional comfort.

== Removal of shoes ==
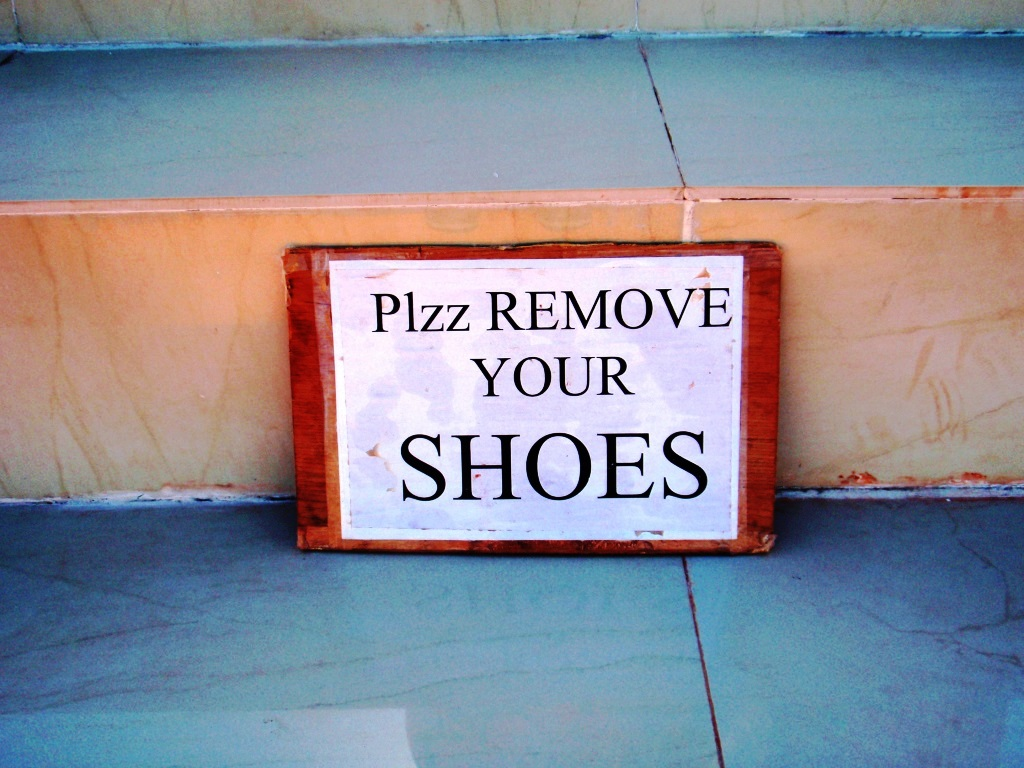
"Plzz REMOVE YOUR SHOES" sign at entrance to stupa. Nubra, India

In many places in the world, shoes are removed when moving from exteriors to interiors, particularly in homes and religious buildings. In many Asian countries, outdoor shoes are exchanged for indoor shoes or slippers. Fitness center etiquette encourages the exchange of outdoor shoes for indoor shoes, both to prevent dirt and grime from being transferred to the equipment and to ensure that participants are wearing the right shoes for their activities.

== See also ==
- Cordwainer
- Shoemaking
- Foot binding
- List of shoe companies
- List of shoe styles
- Locomotor effects of shoes
- Runner's toe, injury from malfitting shoes
- Shoe dryer
- Shoe rack
- Shoe tossing
- Trousers
- Shoe fetish

== Bibliography ==
- Bergstein, Rachelle (2012). Women from the Ankle Down: The Story of Shoes and How They Define Us (Hardback). New York: Harper Collins. pp. 284 pages. ISBN 978-0-06-196961-4.
- Doe, Tamasin (1998), Patrick Cox: Wit, Irony, and Footwear, ISBN 0-8230-1148-8.
- Pattison, Angela, A Century of Shoes: Icons of Style in the 20th Century, ISBN 0-7858-0835-3.
- Swann, June. History of Footwear in Norway, Sweden and Finland: Prehistory to 1950, ISBN 91-7402-323-3.
