= Silahlik =

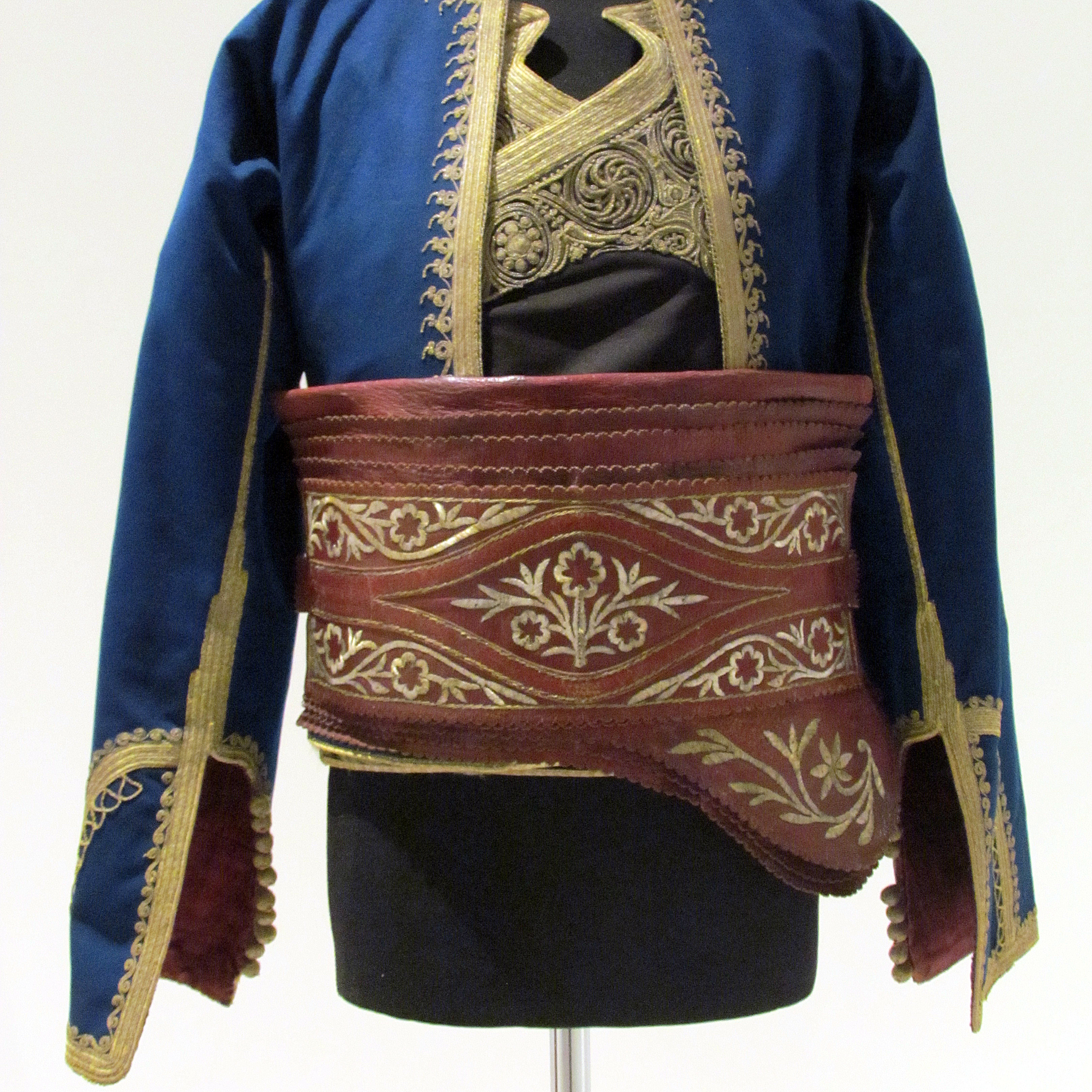
Serbian Silahlik

The Silahlik (Selahlik) also referred to as Bensilah is a wide, multi layered belt worn throughout the Ottoman Empire with partitions in which tobacco, pipes, tinder, money and weapons were stored.

== Design and features ==
Materials: Common versions were made from sturdy leather. For higher-status individuals, such as officials and wealthy merchants, the belt was often crafted from luxurious gold-embroidered fabrics like velvet or silk, adorned with elaborate decoration.

Compartments: The belt was constructed from multiple layers of material, creating a series of vertical purpose-built pockets for a range of items. Standard compartments were dedicated to storing tobacco, tinder, a long-stemmed pipe (chibouk), and money.

Weapon Storage: Its most recognizable function was as a holster for weapons. It featured specific, snug-fitting partitions for a yataghan and a pair of pistols (Kubur). A dedicated channel for a ramrod was also common. With the advent of cartridge-based firearms in the late 19th century, the design was adapted to include pockets for revolvers, such as the Gasser.

Protection: A long protective flap, often attached to the top of the belt, could be pulled down and secured over the openings of the compartments to shield the valuable contents from rain, dust, or theft.

Decoration: Decoration varied widely. Both leather & fabric belts were embroidered with metallic thread in intricate floral or geometric patterns.

== Use and significance ==
The Silahlik was a standard part of military equipment for officers and irregular troops, allowing them to carry essential arms and supplies. Aside from its military application, the belt was incorporated into the formal national dress of various regions within the Empire, signifying status, wealth, and readiness. As such, it was worn by civilians for ceremonial occasions, festivals, and as a marker of social standing.

== Gallery ==
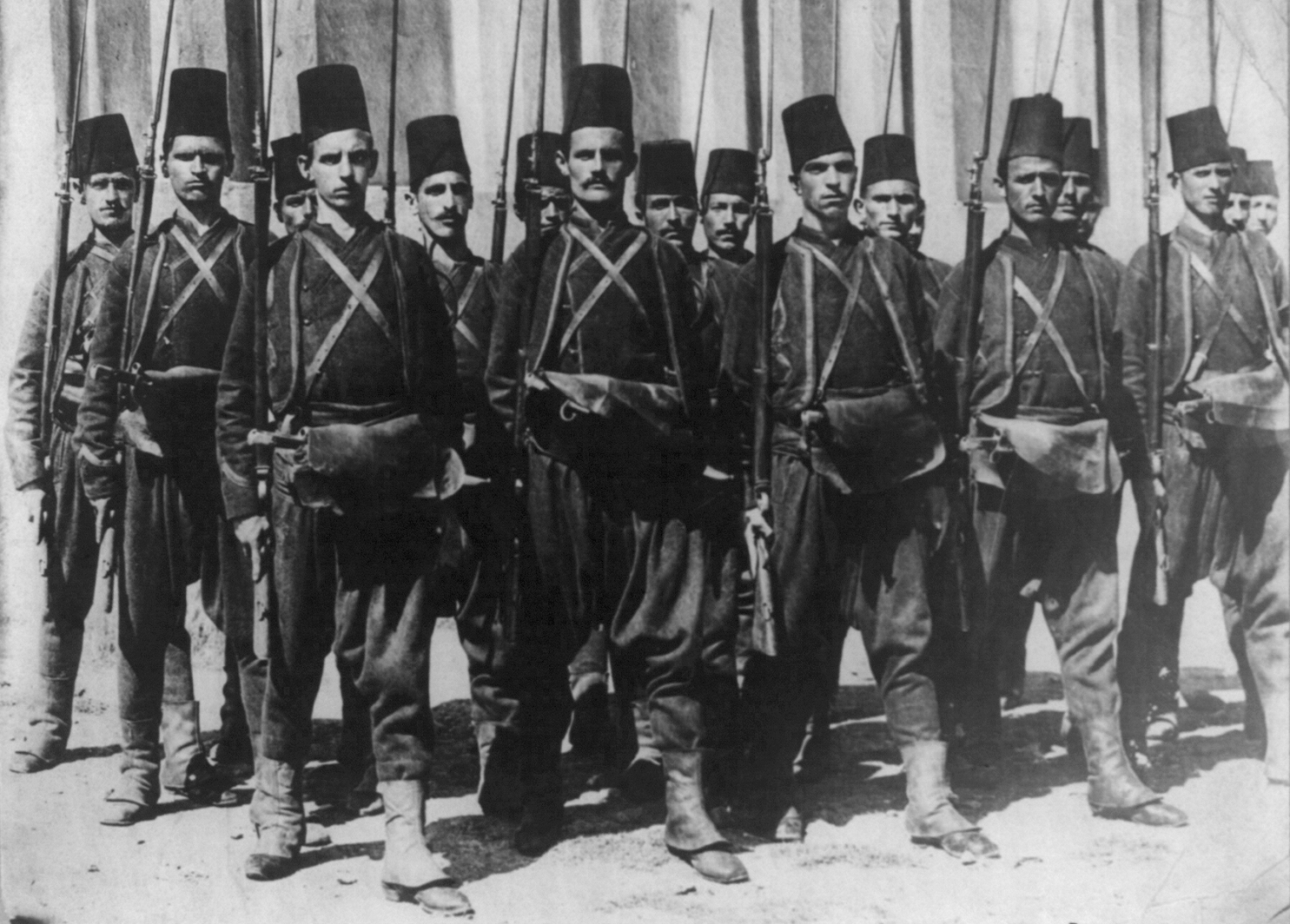
Ottoman Soldiers

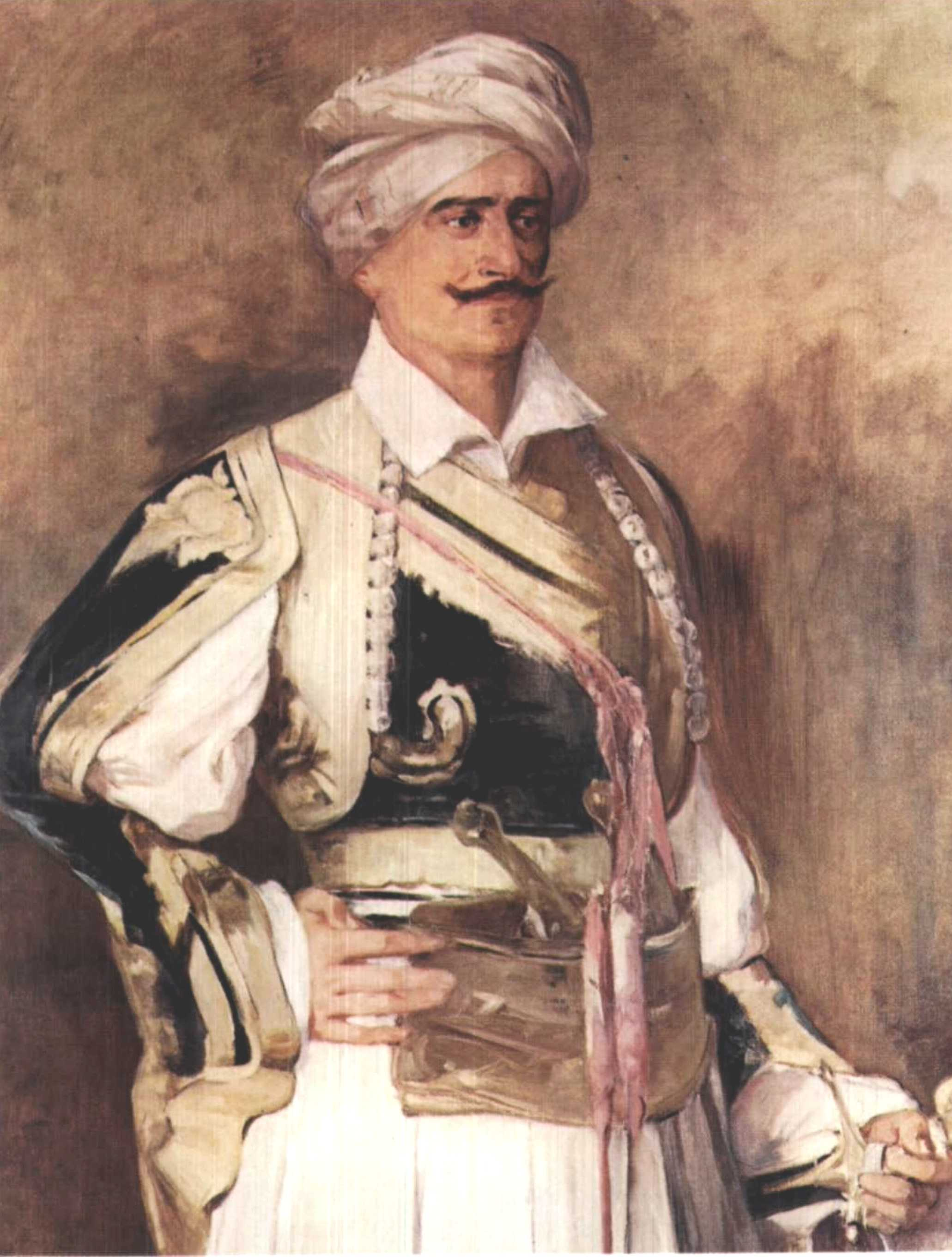
Montenegrin General, Vasos Mavrovouniotis

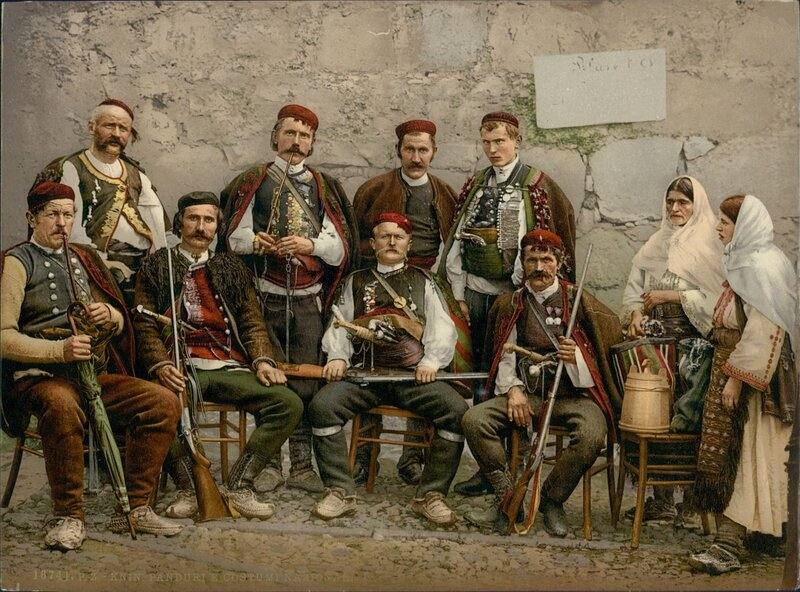
Armed Serbians

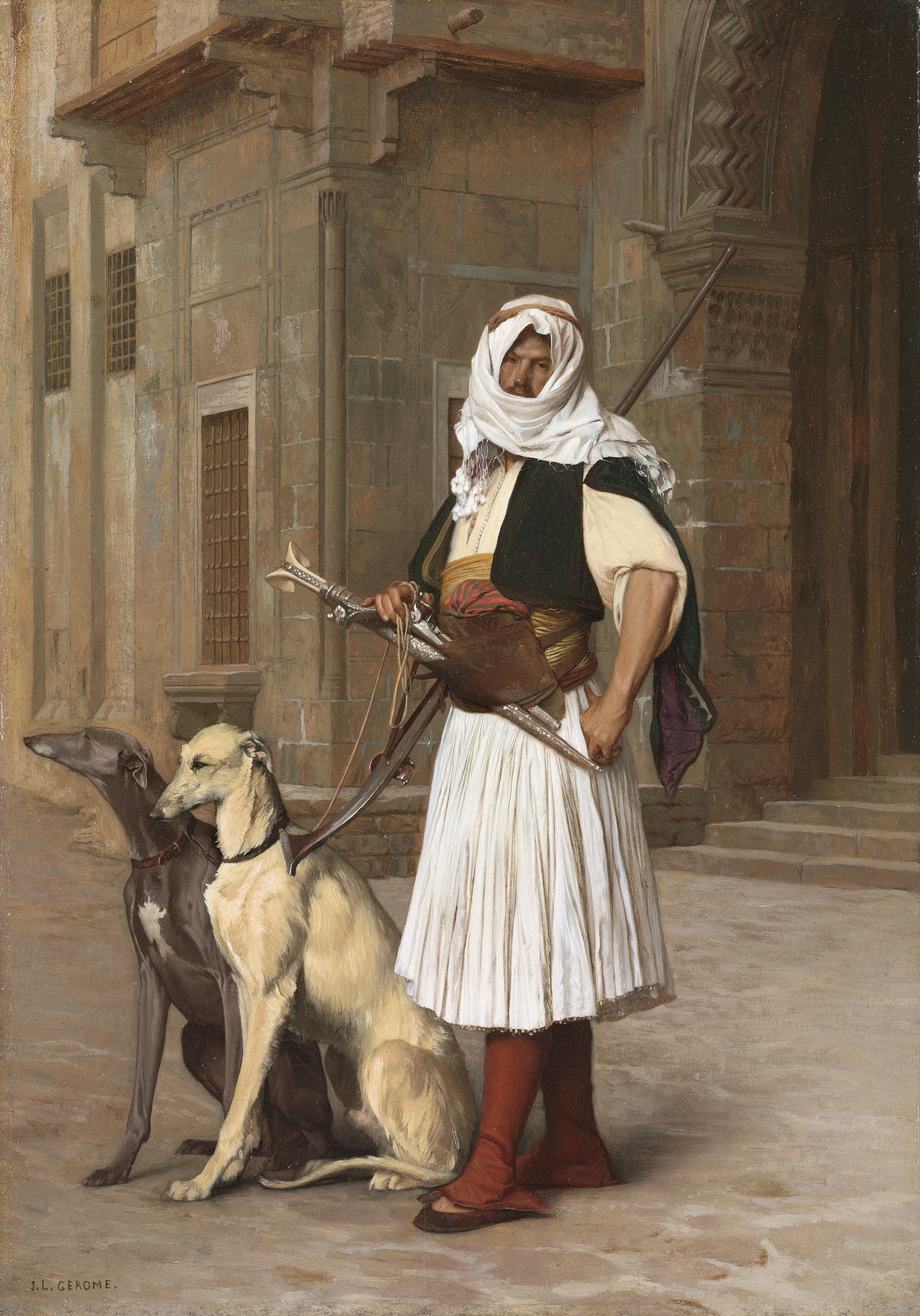
Albanian in Egypt

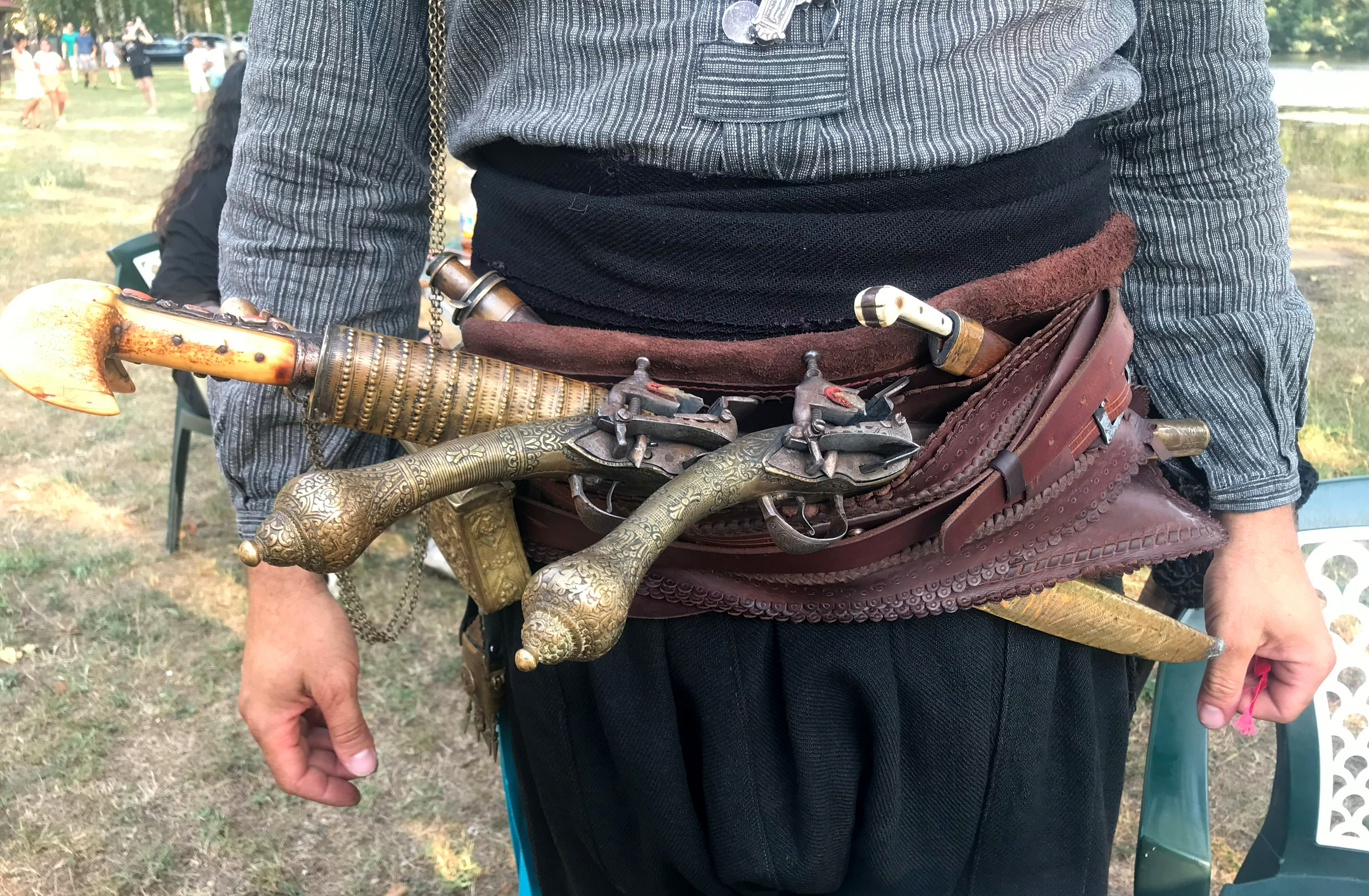
Bulgarian Reenactor

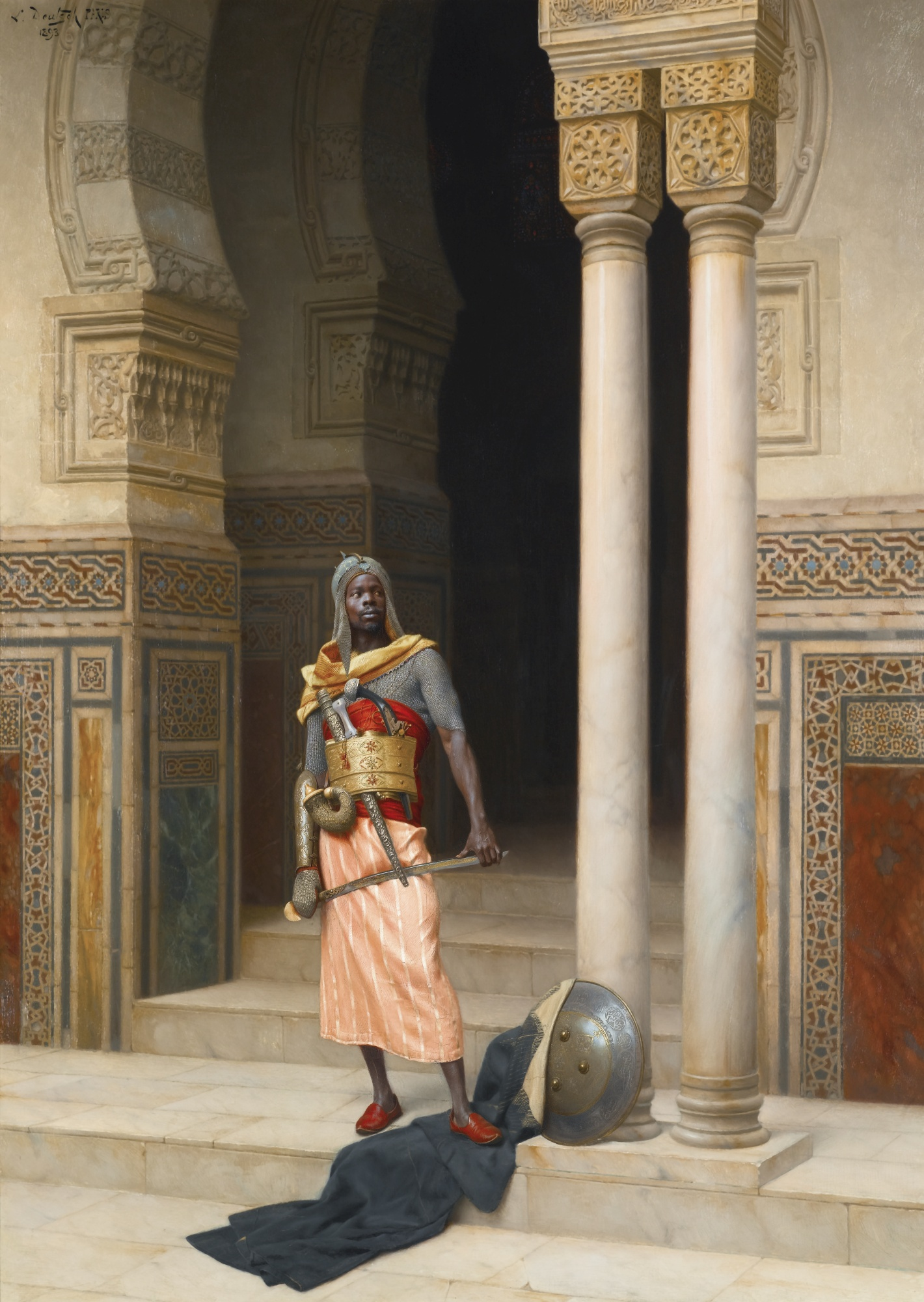
Palace Guard with Fabric Silahlik

== See also ==
- Yataghan
- Kubur
- Ottoman clothing
- Military of the Ottoman Empire
