= Jaitsar =

- City
- Location in Rajasthan, India Jaitsar (India)
- Coordinates: 29°20′43″N 73°39′36″E
- Country: India
- State: Rajasthan
- District: Anupgarh district

Government
  - Type: Sub-Tehsil

Population
  - Total: 7,297
- Time zone: Indian Standard Time (IST)
- PIN code: 335702
- Website: www.jaitsar.com

Jaitsar was named after Th. Sahab Shri Jatan Singh Rathore, The town is in the Anupgarh district district of Rajasthan,

Jaitsar Central State Farm was established in 1964. It is the second largest farm of Asia. Indian cabinet also approved 200 mW solar plant on 400 hectare of CSF, Jaitsar . Jaitsar panchayat is also known as 1Gb-A Village.

Jaitsar is a designated sub tehsil.

== Demographics ==
According to census 2011 by government of India, total population of Jaitsar was 7,297.

Religious demographics of Jaitsar.
Tehsil	Percentage
Hindu	88.62%
Sikh	10.61%
Muslim	0.49 %
Buddhist	0.01%
Christian	0.0%
Jain	0.0%

== Culture ==
Jaitsar town contains a wide cultural diversity. Most of the people from the main city are local merchants and the people from surrounded rural area are farmers. The city has native Rajasthani people living there along with Arora community who follow traditional Punjabi culture with some native Rajasthani influence. Kashmiri Pandits (Kashmiri migrants) have been living in the city and nearby villages of 3LC (A) and 4LC since 1950 speak their native language 'Poonchi'.

== Tourist attractions ==
- Historical Gurudwara Buddha Johad. A large gurudwara, which is 14 km from Jaitsar and 74 km from Anupgarh & 55 km from Ganganagar in the south-west. This is a place where Bhai Sukha Singh and Mehtab Singh brought the head of Massa Rangarh (guilty of sacrilege of the Amritsar Golden Temple) and hung it on a tree on 11 August 1740.
- Jaitsar-Sardargarh Central State Farm

== Sports ==
Jaitsar Stadium

Jaitsar Stadium is located at Government Senior secondary school. Hundreds of people come here on daily basis for the physical training for the recruitment processes. TH. Shri Ravindar Singh Rathore is National Gold medalist in kabaddi from here.

There is infrastructure for the practice of sports such as cricket, football, kabaddi, badminton, volleyball and basketball.

== Railway stations ==
Jaitsar Station connects it to major stations such as Sriganganagar, Suratgarh, Jaipur, Delhi, Amritsar, etc

Sarupsar Junction is a Jaitsar Area Railway Junction which connects it to Vijaynagar, Anoopgarh etc.

Bugia Halt: a Jaitsar Area Railway Station which is constructed for people of nearby rural Area
