= Shiazo =

German brand of steam stones

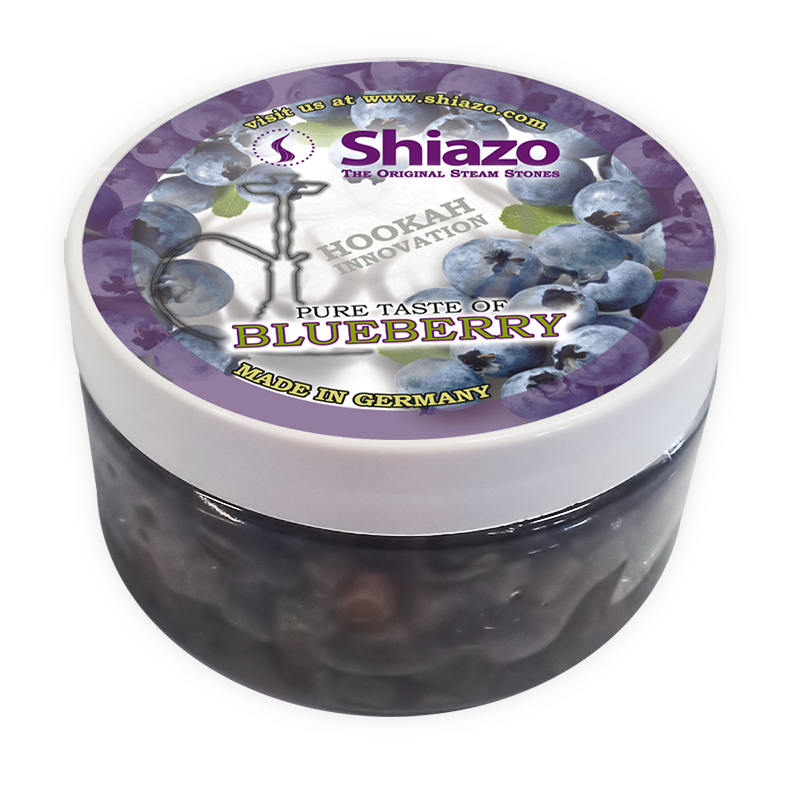
A 100 g container of Shiazo Blueberry being sold as a tobacco substitute

Shiazo is a brand of steam stones from Germany. It was the first brand in the world offering this type of product that consists of a porous mineral which soaks up vegetable glycerol and flavors to generate flavored vapor when being heated. Shiazo can be used as a substitute for hookah tobacco or as a room scent.

Using Shiazo as tobacco substitute is similar to how electronic cigarettes work and thus supposed to be a healthier alternative to smoking and may be used inside public buildings even after the smoking ban in the European Union.
