= Gurudwara Buddha Johad =

Gurudwara Buddha Johad ਗੁਰੂਦੁਆਰਾ ਬੁੱਢਾ ਜੋਹੜ
- Gurudwara
- Location in Rajasthan, India Gurudwara Buddha Johad (India)
- Coordinates: 29.4664283°N 73.6408289°E
- Country: India
- State: Rajasthan
- District: Shri Ganganagar district
- Time zone: UTC+5:30 (IST)
- ISO 3166 code: RJ-IN

Gurudwara Buddha Johad (in Punjabi ਗੁਰੂਦੁਆਰਾ ਬੁੱਢਾ ਜੋਹੜ, in Hindi and Rajasthani गुरूद्वारा बुड्ढा जोहड़) is a historical Gurudwara in Ganganagar district of Rajasthan, India. It was built in the remembrance of the event when Sukha Singh and Mehtab Singh brought here head of Massa Ranghar, who was guilty of sacrilege of Amritsar's Golden Temple.

== Location ==
Gurudwara Buddha Johad is located by Dabla village in the Raisinghnagar tehsil of Ganganagar district of Rajasthan. It is situated on Padampur-Jaitsar road. It is 350 km from Amritsar. It is 85 km from Ganganagar, 30 km from Raisinghnagar and about 550 km from state capital Jaipur. The nearest major town is Jaitsar,15 km from Gurudwara Sahib.

== History ==
The birth of Khalsa in 1699 brought changes in socio-political circumstances of Punjab. Sikhs began to protest religious policies of Mughal government. The death of Aurangzeb caused chaos in Punjab and Sikhs started protest campaigns against representatives of Mughal empire. Consequently, Mughal government began to crush Sikhs.

=== Massa Ranghar occupied the Golden temple ===
Zakariya Khan Bahadur was the governor of Lahore district from 1726 to 1745, after 1739 he intensified his campaign against Sikhs, forcing them to flee to hilly or desert areas beyond the central Punjab. Zakriya Khan in 1740, Zakaria Khan stationed Massa Ranghar the task of preventing Sikhs devotees to come around Amritsar. Massa Ranghar or Mir Musalul Khan was the choudhry of Mandiala. Massa Rangar physically very strong. He is a fit man with 5'11" height.He placed his cot in the centre of the temple, and set about desecrating it to his heart's fill. Ranghar not only occupied the holy place, but committed sacrilege by carousing with dancing girls and consuming meat and alcohol in the Sanctum Sanctorum situated in the midst of the sacred pool.

=== Sukha Singh and Mehtab Singh ===
Sukkha Singh a brave Sikh devotee, was born at Mari Kamboke, in Amritsar district, .Mahtab singh was from village of Mirankot, near Amritsar. On 11 August 1740, these Sikh brave men disguised themselves as Muslims of Patti and went inside Golden temple with the sacks on their shoulders. They saw that Massa Ranghar was smoking Hukka, prostitutes were dancing and wine was flowing freely. They placed the sacks under the bed and said, "We have come to pay the revenue." When Massa Ranghar bent to feel the sacks, Mehtab Singh cut off his head and put it in a sack. They escaped before the Mughal soldiers could realize what had happened. Then, he and his friend walked their horses into the village. People saw them and very joyful and surprised to see them alive. They saw the head of a man on top of the lance and realized that Bhai Mehtab Singh had succeeded in his mission.

=== Sukhha Singh and Mehtab Singh in Rajasthan ===
Bhai Sukha Singh and Mehtab Singh brought the head of Massa Rangarh came to northern Rajasthan, that time this was jungle area. At the site of Buddha Johad they hung the head of Massa Ranghar on a tree. After many years a large Gurudwara was established here and became worship place of sikhs.

== The Gurudwara Buddha Johad Complex and areas ==
The historical paintings and monuments are seeing worthy. The Jand tree still stood where Sukha Singh and Mehtab Singh tied their horses and handed over the head of Massa to Jathedar Baba Budha Singh but fell down in 2000. There is a big pond in the complex. Devotees gather here specially on Massya(dark moon day). A fair is held on this occasion. Many students come here to learn about Gurbani singing.
