= Chibouk =

Long-stemmed Turkish tobacco pipe

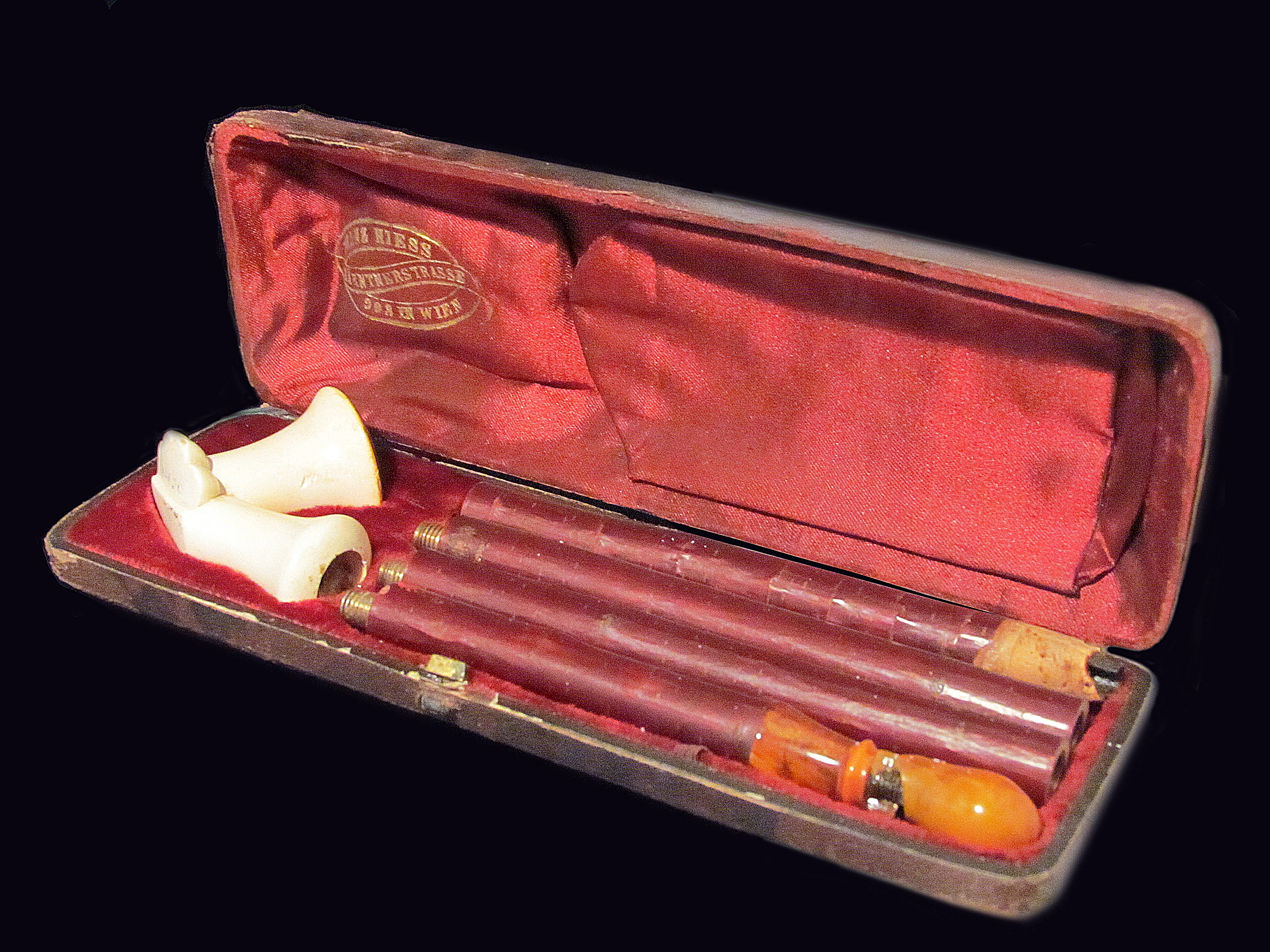
An Austrian-made chibouk that belonged to Miloš Obrenović, Prince of Serbia

A chibouk (/tʃɪˈbʊk, -ˈbuːk/; French: chibouque; from the Turkish: çıbık, çubuk (English: "stick" from the Persian word choobak "چوبک" meaning small wooden stick) (Albanian: "Çibuk"); also romanized čopoq, ciunoux or tchibouque) is a very long-stemmed Turkish tobacco pipe, often featuring a clay bowl ornamented with precious stones. The stem of the chibouk generally ranges between 4 and 5 ft. (1.2 and 1.5 m), much longer than even Western churchwarden pipes. While primarily known as a Turkish pipe, the chibouk was once popular across the Ottoman Empire and in Iran as well.

Like Chinese opium pipes, chibouk are antiquated smoking devices, and are rarely, if at all produced in modern times. Their use in Turkey and the Middle East may have died out with the growing popularity of the hookah and cigarettes. Old chibouk and chibouk bowls can still be purchased as antiques.

Similar pipes were once used in North Africa to smoke hashish. Some specialized chibouk were produced to act as long, cigarette-holding pipes. Some had detachable mouthpieces.

Ismail Pasha was known to have smoked chibouk, as was Jirjis al-Jawhari (Moallem Guerguis Koft), a Coptic Egyptian leader appointed the General Steward of all Egypt by Napoleon in 1798.

The Chibouk Smoker by Théobald Chartran, Turc Au Chibouk by James Lewis Caw, Interieur d'un café Turc by Chevalier Auguste de Henikstein, and Guerrier fumant le Chibouk by Johann Hermann are examples of chibouk featured in art and illustration. Chibouques also appear in literature: in Alexandre Dumas's The Count of Monte Cristo, they are described as having jasmine stems and amber mouthpieces.

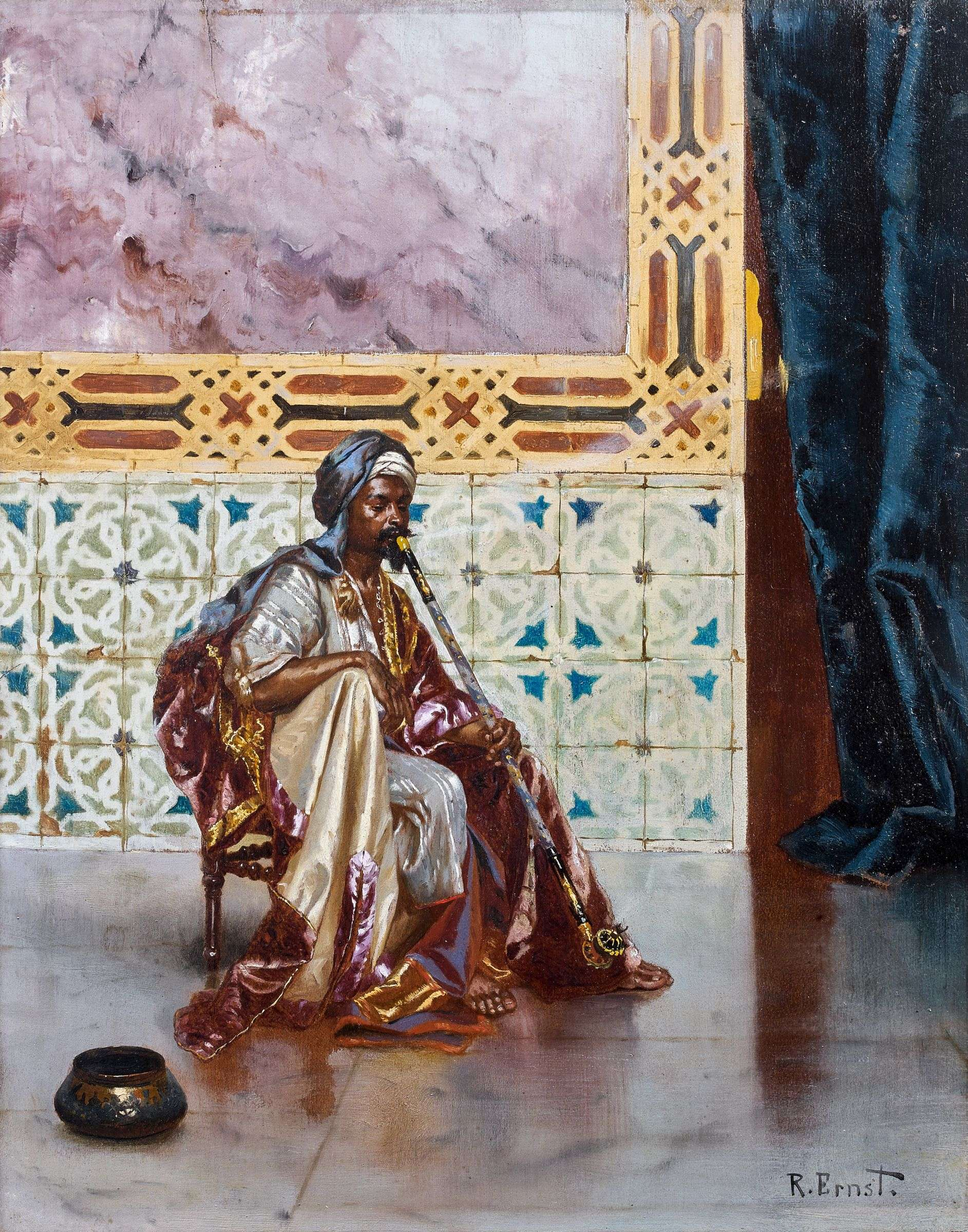
Rudolf Ernst, Chibouk smoker

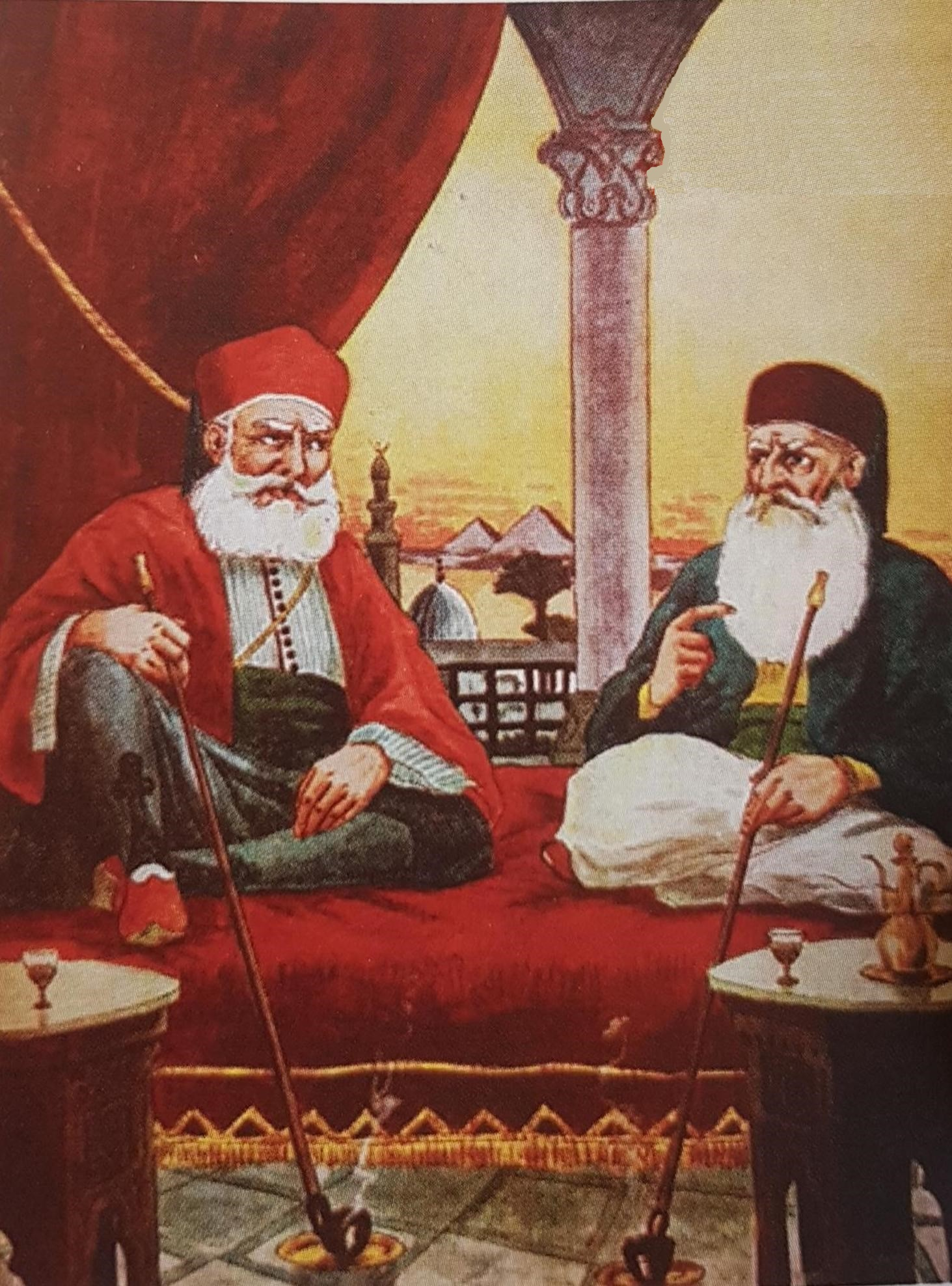
Depiction of Muhammad Ali and Bashir Shihab II with chibouks

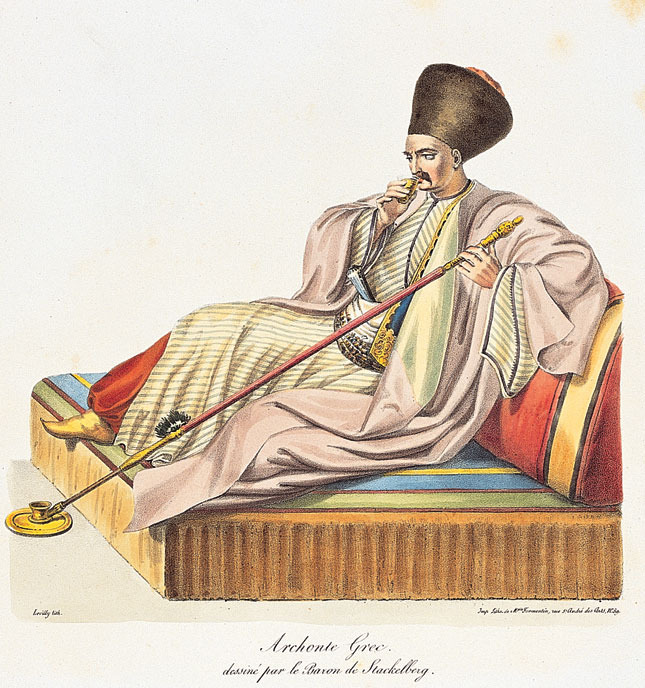
An 1828 illustration of a Greek archon holding a chibouk by Otto Magnus von Stackelberg.

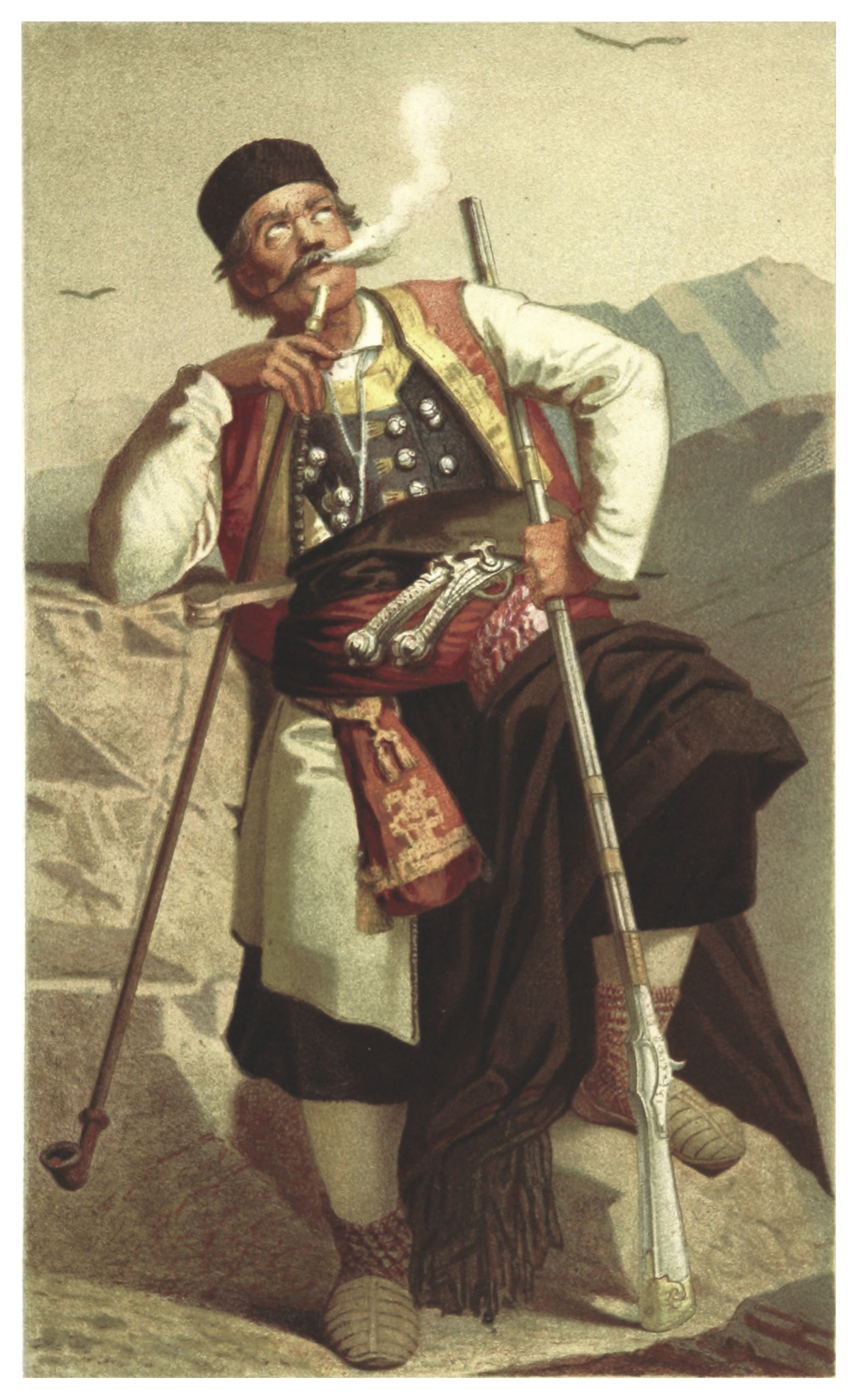
An 1870 painting of a Montenegrin man smoking a chibouk by Louis Salvator
