= Churchwarden pipe =

Style of tobacco pipe

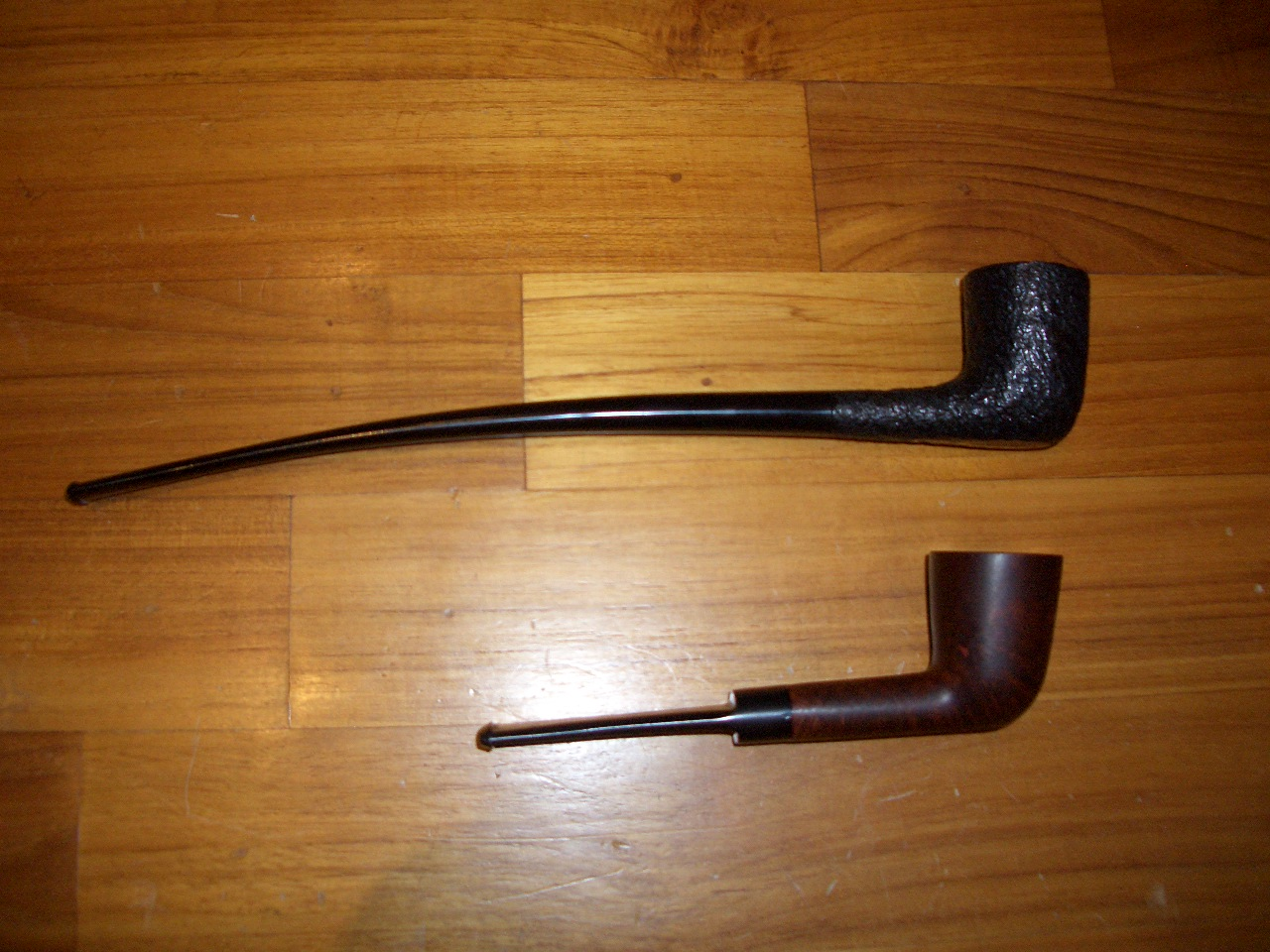
Savinelli churchwarden pipe (above) in comparison to a more "traditional" pipe (below)

A churchwarden pipe is a tobacco pipe with a long stem. The history of the pipe style is traced to the late eighteenth or early nineteenth century. Some churchwarden pipes can be as long as 16 inches (40 cm). In German the style is referred to as "Lesepfeife" or "reading pipe", presumably because the longer stem allowed an unimpeded view of one's book, and smoke does not form near the reader's eyes, allowing one to look down.

== History ==
Such pipes were very popular as an Oriental influence from the seventeenth century onwards in Europe. They remained most popular in Eastern Europe, as an emblem of the Hussars, cavalry troops with roots in Hungary and Poland, whose employment and influence spread from Russia to France and England during the Napoleonic Wars and brought the pipes with them as part of their characteristic dress. It was even known as the "Hussar pipe" at the time. Engraved portraits exist of men smoking such an instrument. This long stem pipe type has its origins in the Ottoman Empire, geographically and historically.

Clay churchwarden pipes were also used during the pioneer era in North America. Many clay pieces of these pipes have been found by archaeologists, giving rise to the myth that the long stems of the clay churchwarden pipes would, for sanitation purposes, be broken off by the next client of the tavern or saloon who wished to smoke. However, there is no evidence to support this claim. In fact, pipes were cleaned by being placed in iron cradles and baked in ovens. Examples of such clay pipes can be seen at the historic Fort Osage museum in Fort Osage, Missouri.

== Practical considerations ==
Churchwarden pipes generally produce a cooler smoke due to the distance smoke must travel from the bowl to the mouthpiece. They have the added benefit of keeping the user's face further away from the heat and smoke produced by combustion in the bowl. They are also more prone to breakage since more pressure is placed on the tenon when the pipe is supported around the mouthpiece. Long ago, churchwarden pipes were made of clay and were common in taverns, and sometimes a set of pipes would have been owned by the establishment and used by different clients like other service items (plates, tankards, etc.).

== Etymology ==
Churchwarden pipes are reputedly named after churchwardens, who are lay members of a parish community with various official duties in the church. The long stem serves to keep smoke and heated tobacco away from the face and allow for unimpeded views. The pipe's resemblance to the long "candle snuffer" used by Churchwardens in their duties is also a possible source for the name.

== See also ==
- Chibouk
