= Jaitsar Central State Farm =

Farms in india

The Jaitsar Central State Farm was established by the Indian government in 1964 on 12150 hectares of land in Jaitsar, Sri Ganganagar. The Soviet Union provided agriculture machinery and trained Indian farm operators.

The primary crops of the farm are wheat, gram, mustard, rapeseed, moong, bajra and Sorghum bicolor.

The Indian cabinet also approved a 200 mW solar plant on 400 hectares of CSF Jaitsar land.
