= Jirjis al-Jawhari =

- Arabic: جرجس الجوهري
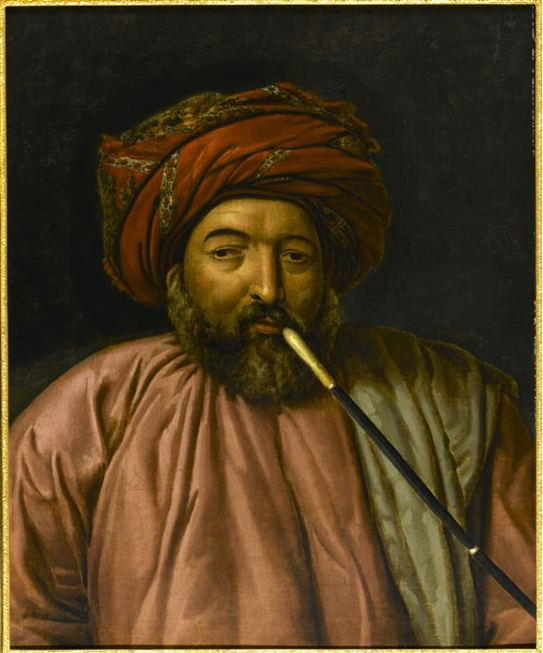
- In office 1795–1801
- Monarch: Murad Bey
- Preceded by: Ibrahim al-Jawhari
- Succeeded by: Mu‘allim Ghali

Personal details
- Died: September 26, 1810; Cairo, Khedivate of Egypt

Jirjis al-Jawhari (Egyptian Arabic: جرجس الجوهري, romanized: girges algawhari) was an Egyptian minister of finance and chief archon of the Copts in 1795-1801 during the reign of the Mamluk Murad Bey and a General Steward of Egypt (French: l’Intendant Général de l’Égypte) during the French administration.

== Biography ==
Jirjis, born to a Coptic family, inherited his title from his brother, Ibrahim al-Jawhari, after his death in 1795. His position can be described as "gray eminence", in whose hands all threads of the Egyptian administration converged.

After the conquest of Egypt by Napoleon al-Jawhari started cooperating with the French and was given a position of a General Steward of Egypt. Collecting taxes and providing French army with supplies were among his responsibilities.

During the revolt of Cairo al-Jawhari's house was set on fire and he almost got killed, but saved by the French troops. Nonetheless after the suppression of the revolt he was replaced by another Coptic general Yaqub bin Hena. With the reorganization of the financial administration, al-Jawhari was relieved of responsibility for the collection of public revenues, which was given to a Frenchman named Estève. However, he continued to work as one of the five leading provincial general intendants.

al-Jawhari's willingness to support the French was motivated by the belief that the Coptic community would have a better future under a Christian government than under Muslim rule. And indeed, Napoleon granted some of his requests concerning the status of Dhimmis immediately, in anticipation of earning further Coptic support.

After the departure of the French in 1801 he decided to immigrate to France but later returned to Egypt gaining a favour of the Ottoman governor Mehmed Hüsrev Pasha.

Under Muhammad Ali, who seized power in Cairo in July 1805, al-Jawhari fell into disgrace and had to flee to the Mamluk beys in Upper Egypt. He was pardoned after four years of exile.

Ten months after his return to Cairo, he became ill and died in September 1810.
