= Mandiala =

- Village
- Country: India
- State: Punjab
- District: Gurdaspur
- Tehsil: Batala
- Region: Majha

Government
  - Type: Panchayat raj
  - Body: Gram panchayat

Area
  - Total: 212 ha (520 acres)

Population (2011)
  - Total: 1,998; 1,057/941 ♂/♀
  - Scheduled Castes: 854; 438/416 ♂/♀
  - Total Households: 385

Languages
  - Official: Punjabi
- Time zone: UTC+5:30 (IST)
- Telephone: 01871
- ISO 3166 code: IN-PB
- Vehicle registration: PB-18
- Website: gurdaspur.nic.in

Mandiala is a village in Batala in Gurdaspur district of Punjab State, India. It is located 25 kilometres (16 mi) from sub district headquarter, 55 kilometres (34 mi) from district headquarter and 15 kilometres (9.3 mi) from Sri Hargobindpur. The village is administrated by Sarpanch an elected representative of the village.

== Demography ==
As of 2011, the village has a total number of 385 houses and a population of 1998 of which 1057 are males while 941 are females. According to the report published by Census India in 2011, out of the total population of the village 854 people are from Schedule Caste and the village does not have any Schedule Tribe population so far.

== See also ==
- List of villages in India
