= Hookah =

Type of water pipe

Traditional brass Hookah, Shimla Himachal Pradesh

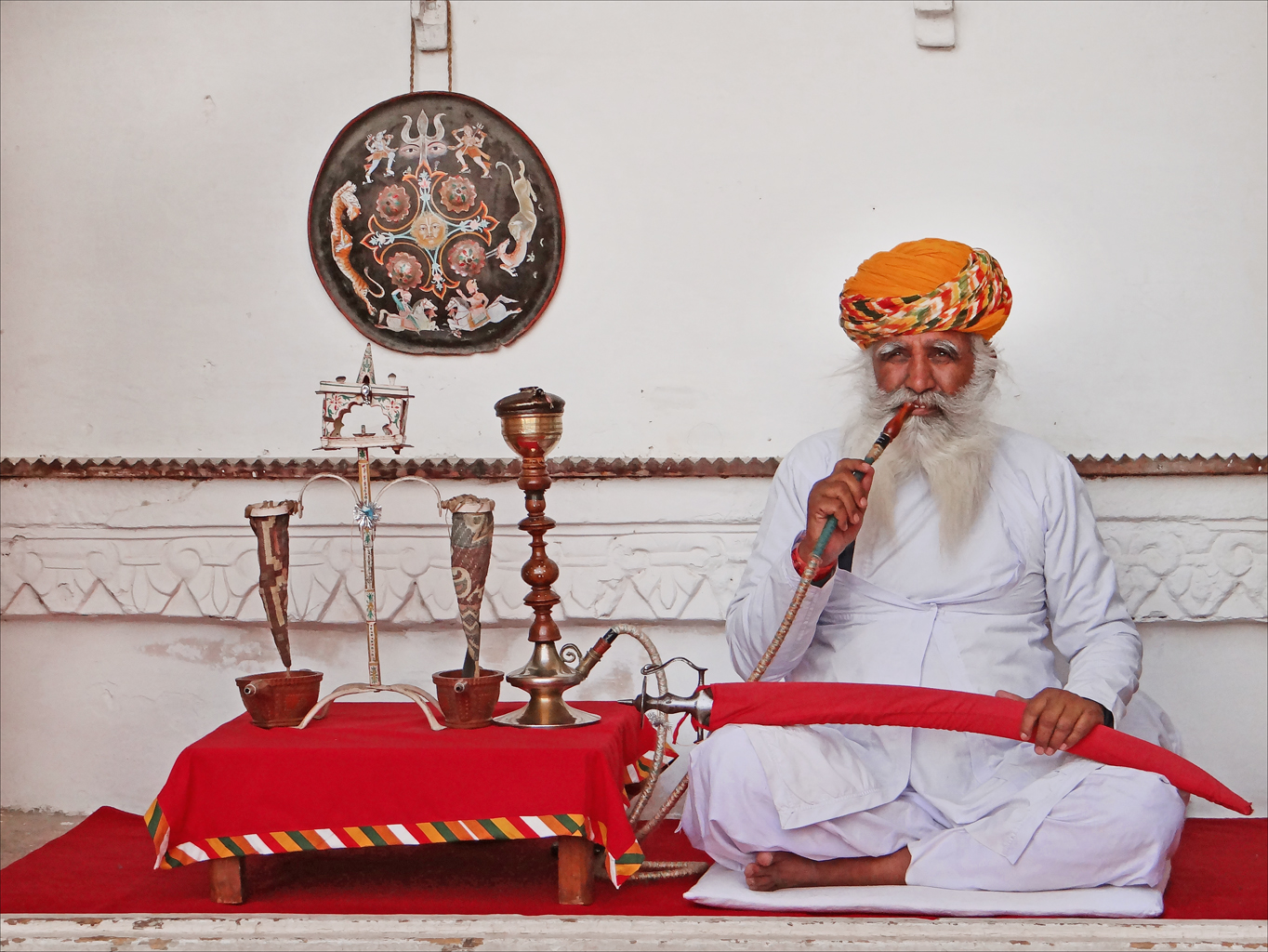
A Rajput man smoking through a hookah, Rajasthan, India.

A hookah (also see other names), shisha, or waterpipe is a single- or multi-stemmed instrument for heating or vaporizing and then smoking either tobacco, flavored tobacco (often muʽassel), or sometimes cannabis, hashish and opium. The smoke is passed through a water basin—often glass-based—before inhalation.

The major health risks of smoking tobacco, cannabis, opium and other drugs through a hookah include exposure to toxic chemicals, carcinogens and heavy metals that are not filtered out by the water, alongside those related to the transmission of infectious diseases when hookahs are shared or not properly cleaned. Hookah and waterpipe use is a global public health concern, with high rates of use in the populations of the Middle East and North Africa as well as in young people in the United States, Europe, Central Asia, and South Asia.

The hookah was invented by Abul-Fath Gilani, an Iranian physician of Akbar, in the Indian city of Fatehpur Sikri during Mughal India. It spread from the Indian subcontinent to Persia first, where the mechanism was modified to its current shape, and then to the Ottoman empire. Alternatively, it could have originated in the Safavid dynasty of Persia, from where it eventually spread to the Indian subcontinent.

Despite tobacco and drug use being considered a taboo when the hookah was first conceived, its use became increasingly popular among nobility and subsequently widely accepted. Burned tobacco is increasingly being replaced by vaporizing flavored tobacco. Still the original hookah is often used in rural South Asia, which continues to use tumbak (a pure and coarse form of unflavored tobacco leaves) and smoked by burning it directly with charcoal. While this method delivers a much higher content of tobacco and nicotine, it also incurs more adverse health effects compared to vaporizing hookahs.

The word hookah is a derivative of "huqqa", a Hindustani word, of Arabic origin (derived from حُقَّة ḥuqqa, "casket, bottle, water pipe"). Outside its native region, hookah smoking has gained popularity throughout the world, especially among younger people.

== Names and etymology ==
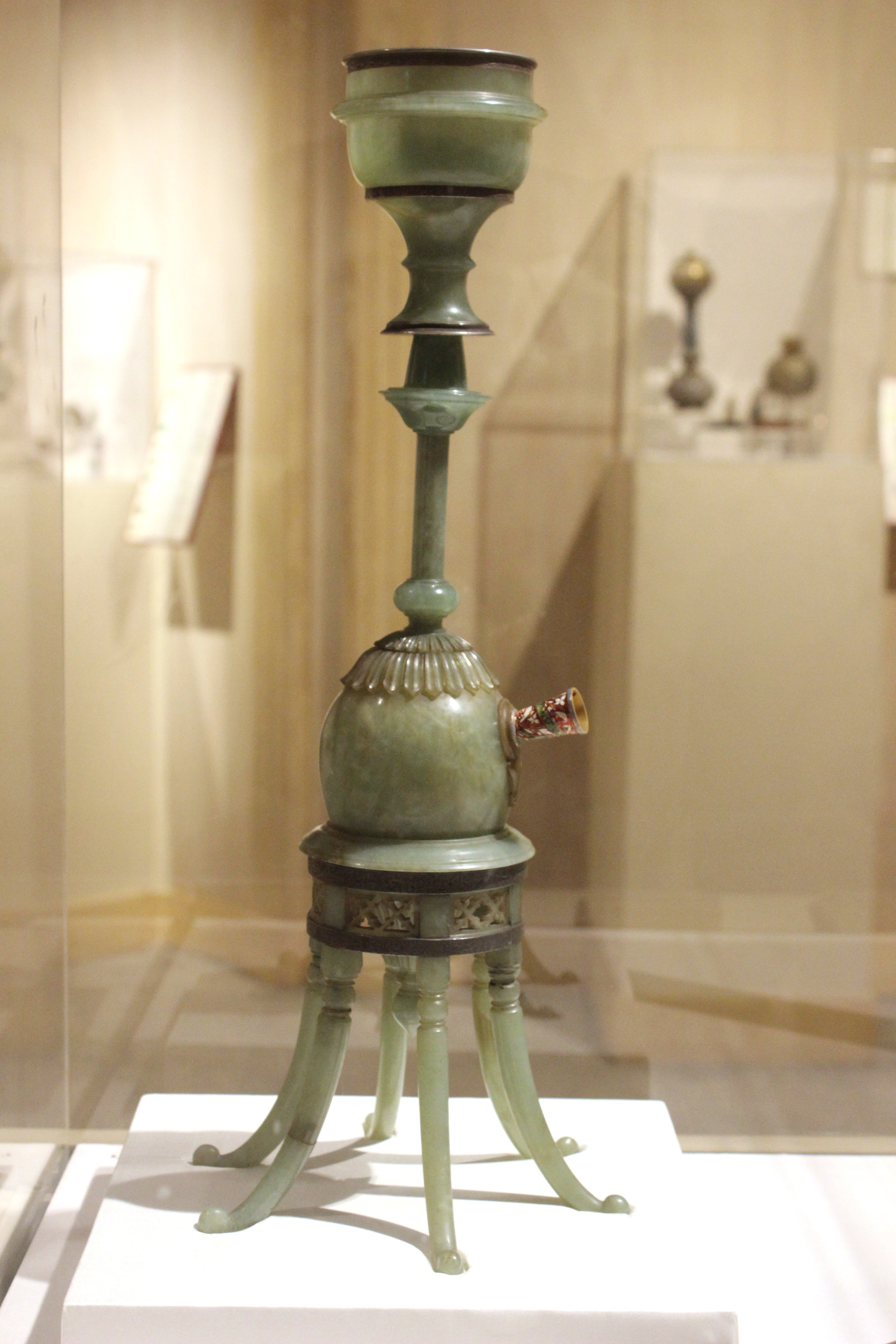
Mughal emperor Jahangir's jade hookah, National Museum, New Delhi, India.

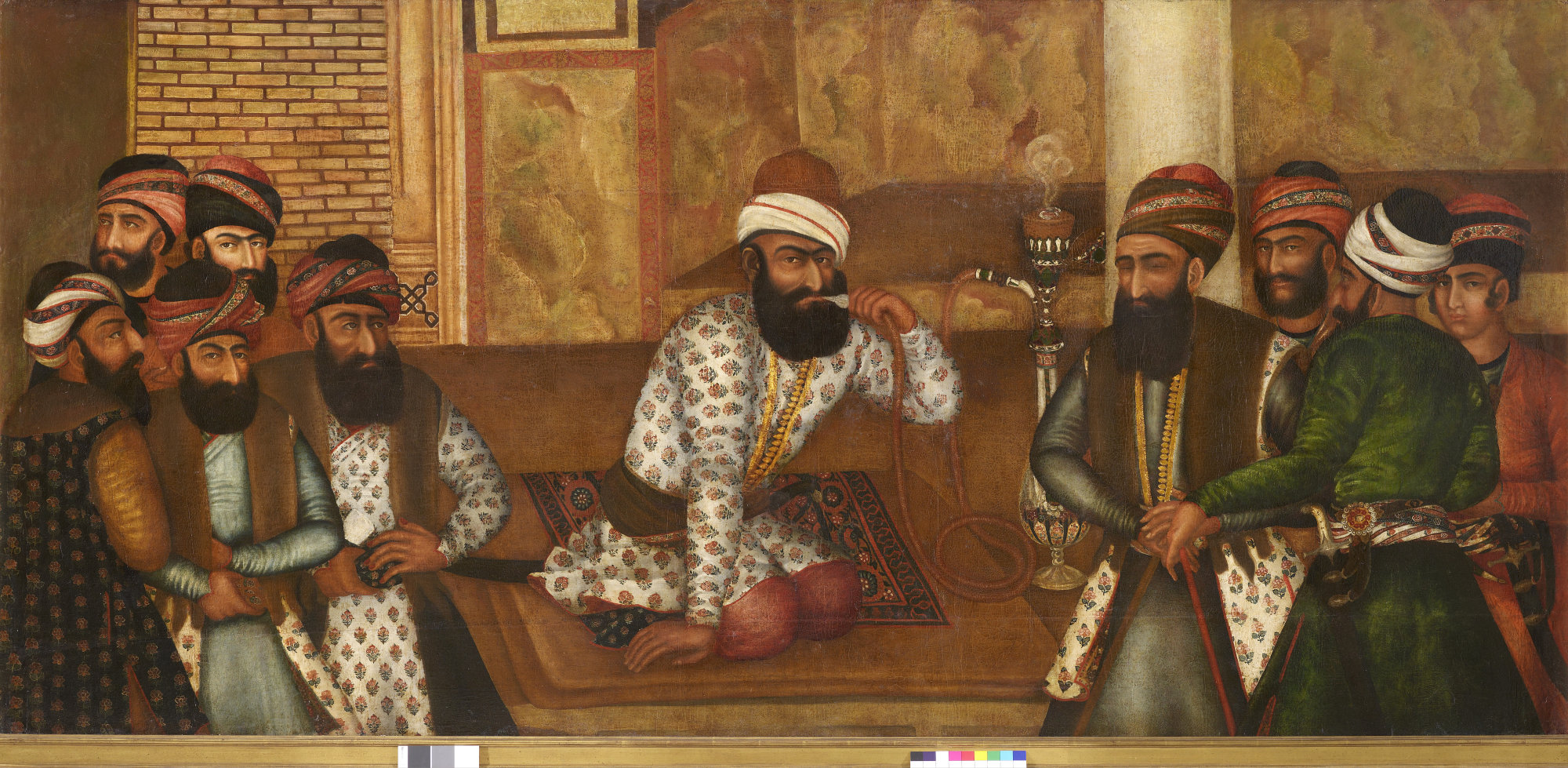
Karim Khan of Persia seated in his royal court in Shiraz, using a Qaelyan (1755).

In the Indian subcontinent, the Hindustani word huqqa (Devanagari: हुक़्क़ा, Nastaleeq: حقّہ) is used and is the origin of the English word "hookah". The widespread use of the Indian word "hookah" in the English language is a result of the colonization in British India (1858–1947), when large numbers of expatriate Britons first sampled the water pipe. William Hickey, shortly after arriving in Calcutta, India, in 1775, wrote in his Memoirs:

The most highly-dressed and splendid hookah was prepared for me. I tried it, but did not like it. As after several trials I still found it disagreeable, I with much gravity requested to know whether it was indispensably necessary that I should become a smoker, which was answered with equal gravity, "Undoubtedly it is, for you might as well be out of the world as out of the fashion. Here everybody uses a hookah, and it is impossible to get on without ...[I] have frequently heard men declare they would much rather be deprived of their dinner than their hookah."

Arabic أرجيلة ('arjīlah) is the name most commonly used in Lebanon, Syria, Palestine, Jordan, Kuwait and Iraq, while nargilah (Hebrew: נַרְגִּילָה, Arabic: نارجيلة) is the name most commonly used in Israel. It derives from nārgil (Persian: نارگیل), which in turn comes from the Sanskrit word nārikela (नारिकेल), meaning coconut, suggesting that early hookahs were hewn from coconut shells.

In Serbia, Bosnia and Herzegovina, North Macedonia, Greece, Cyprus, Turkey and Bulgaria, na[r]gile (на[р]гиле) or na[r]gila (на[р]гила) is used to refer to the pipe, while šiša (шиша) refers to شیشه (šiše) meaning glass bottle in Persian. The pipes there often have one or two mouth pieces. The flavored tobacco, created by marinating cuts of tobacco in a multitude of flavored molasses, is placed above the water and covered by pierced foil with hot coals placed on top, and the smoke is drawn through cold water to cool and filter it. In Albania, the hookah is called "lula" or "lulava". In Romania, it is called narghilea.

"Narguile" is the common word in Spain used to refer to the pipe, although "cachimba" is also used, along with "shisha" by Moroccan immigrants in Spain. The word "narguilé" is used in Portuguese. "Narguilé" is also used in French, along with "chicha".

Arabic شيشة (šīšah), through Ottoman Turkish word شیشه (şîşe), itself a direct loanword from Persian شیشه (šīše) meaning "glass container", is the common term for the hookah in Egypt, Sudan and also other Arab world regions such as Arab Peninsula (including Kuwait, Bahrain, Qatar, Oman, UAE, Yemen and Saudi Arabia), Algeria, Tunisia. It is used also in Morocco and Somalia. In Yemen, the Arabic term مداعة (madā`ah) is also used, but for pipes using pure tobacco.

In Persian-speaking countries, this kind of water pipe is called Persian: غلیان, romanized: ghalyān which is a hypercorrection of Arabic: غليون, romanized: ghalyūn, lit. 'pipe'. It is included in the earliest European compendium on tobacco, the tobacologia written by Johan Neander and published in Dutch in 1622. It seems that over time water pipes acquired a Persian connotation as in eighteenth-century Egypt the most fashionable pipes were called Karim Khan after the Persian ruler of the day. This is also the name used in Ukraine, Russia, Lithuania and Belarus.

In Armenia, a hookah is called nargila or kalyan, due to Persian and Russian influence, respectively.

In Afghanistan, a hookah is called chillim.

In Kashmiri, hookah is called "Jajeer".

In Maldives, hookah is called "Guduguda".

In Germany, Austria and Switzerland, hookah is called "Shisha".

In the Philippines, hookah is called "hitboo" and normally used in smoking flavored marijuana.

In Sindhi, another language of South Asia, it is called huqqo (حُقو / हुक़्क़ो).

In Vietnam, hookah is called hookah shisha (bình shisha) and shisha is called "shisha tobacco" (thuốc shisha).

== History ==
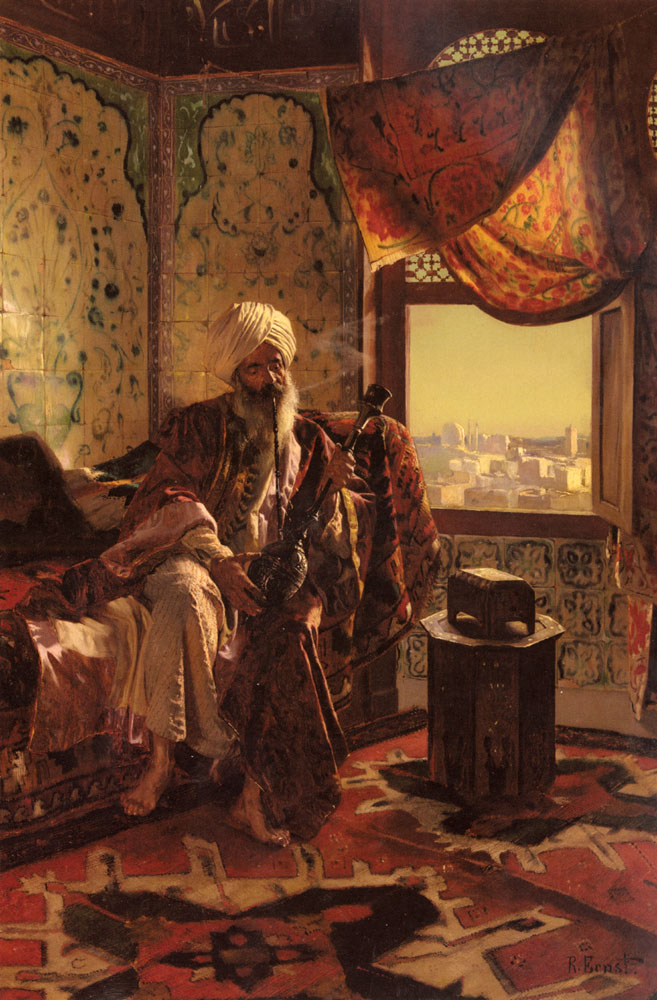
Smoking the Hookah, a painting by Rudolf Ernst

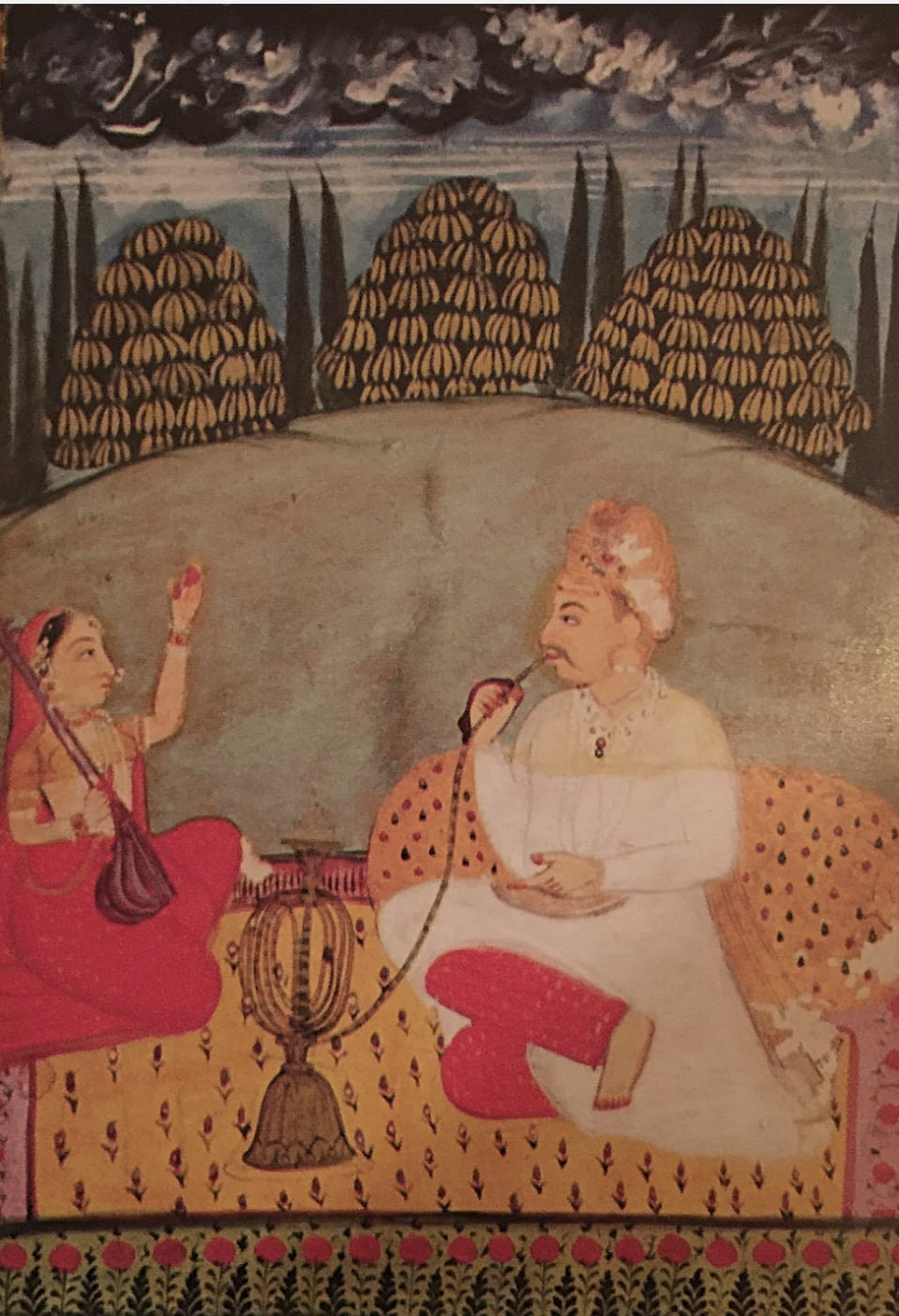
Peshwa Bajirao I smoking a hookah

In the Indian city of Fatehpur Sikri, Roman Catholic missionaries of the Society of Jesus arriving from the southern part of the country introduced tobacco to the Mughal emperor Akbar the Great (1542–1605 AD). Louis Rousselet writes that the physician of Akbar, Hakim Aboul Futteh Ghilani Persian: حکیم ابوالفتح گیلانی, then invented the hookah in India. However, a quatrain of Ahlī Shirazi (d. 1535), a Persian poet, refers to the use of the ḡalyān, thus dating its use at least as early as the time of the Shah Ṭahmāsp I. It seems, therefore, that Abu'l-Fath Gilani should be credited with the introduction of the ḡalyān, already in use in Persia, into India. There is, however, no evidence of the existence of the water pipe until the 1560s. Moreover, tobacco is believed to have arrived in India in the 17th century, until then cannabis was smoked in India, so that suggests another substance was probably smoked in Ahlī Shirazi's quatrain, perhaps through some other method.

Following the European introduction of tobacco to Persia and India, Hakim Abu'l-Fath Gilani, who came from Gilan, a province in the north of Persia, migrated to Hamarastan. He later became a physician in the Mughal court and raised health concerns after smoking tobacco became popular among Indian noblemen. He subsequently envisaged a system that allowed smoke to be passed through water in order to be 'purified'. Gilani introduced the ḡalyān after Asad Beg, the ambassador of Bijapur, encouraged Akbar I to take up smoking. Following popularity among noblemen, this new device for smoking soon became a status symbol for the Indian aristocracy and gentry.

== Modern development ==
Instead of copper, brass and low-quality alloys, manufacturers increasingly use stainless steel and aluminium. Silicone rubber compounds are used for hookah hoses instead of leather and wire. New materials make modern hookahs more durable, eliminate odors while smoking and allow washing without risks of corrosion or bacterial decay. New technologies and modern design trends are changing the appearance of hookahs. Despite the obvious benefits of modern hookahs, because of high production cost and lack of modern equipment in traditional hookah manufacturing regions, most hookahs are still produced with older technologies.

The commercial side of hookah has grown into a global industry. Companies that sell hookah products include Lebanon-based company Al Fakher, founded in 1999 and owned by AIR Global, and the Egypt-based Al-Nakhla or Nakhla Tobacco, both popular in the MENA region. A 2019 report from anti-tobacco nonprofit It's Still Tobacco noted that the industry is about 20 years old, and that innovations include "the creation of pre-prepared ceramic heads, expansion of flavour profiles, and the use of dry ice in the manufacturing process. The public face of the industry is, however, the hospitality sector (waterpipe cafes, bars, and restaurants)."

== Culture ==
=== South Asia ===
==== India ====
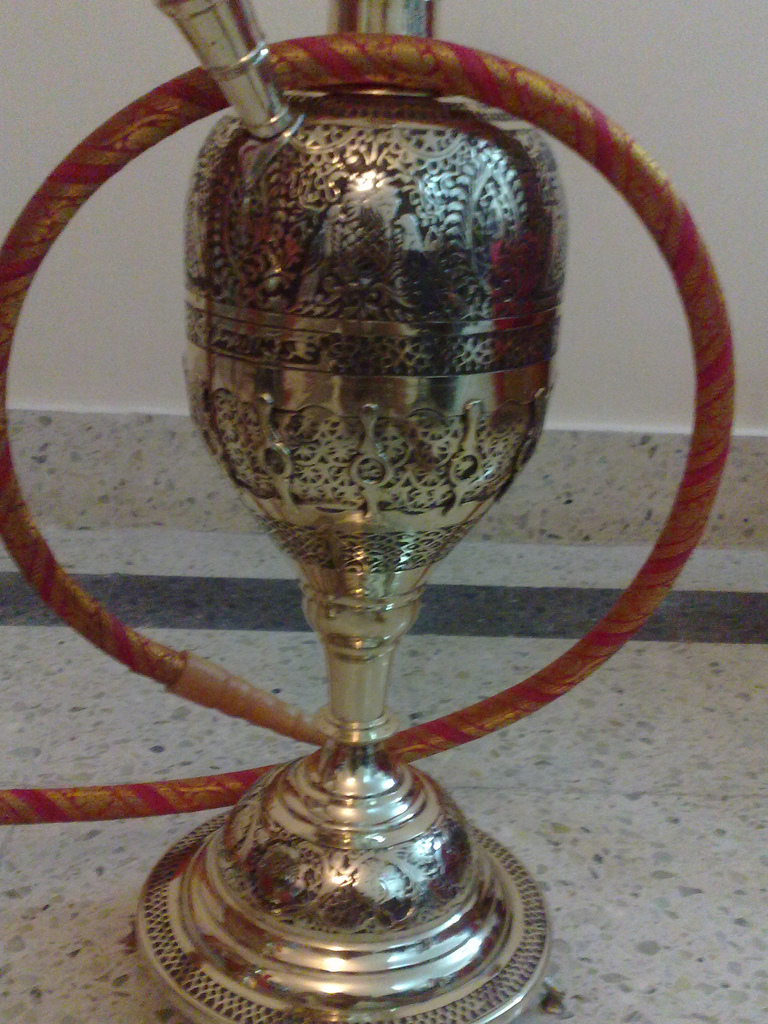
The intricate work on a Malabar hookah.

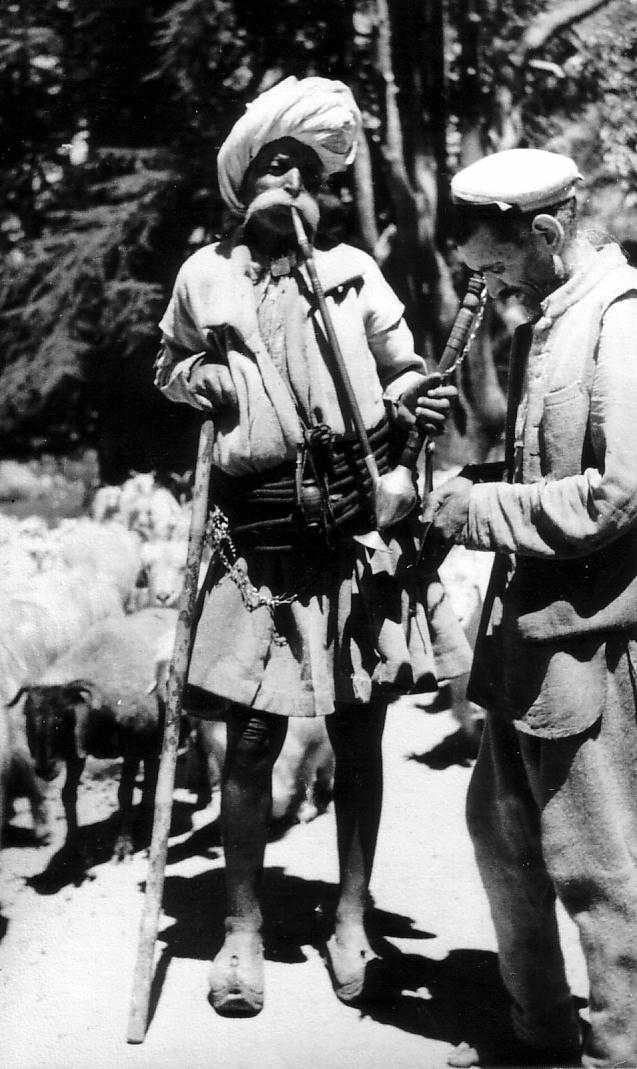
Gaddi village men with hookah, on mountain path near Dharamshala, India.

The concept of hookah is thought to have originated in medieval India. Once the province of the wealthy, it was tremendously popular especially during Mughal rule. The hookah has since become less popular; however, it is once again garnering the attention of the masses, and cafés and restaurants that offer it as a consumable are popular. The use of hookahs from ancient times in India was not only a custom, but a matter of prestige. Rich and landed classes would smoke hookahs.

Tobacco is smoked in hookahs in many villages as per traditional customs. Smoking tobacco-molasses is now becoming popular among the youth in India. There are several chain clubs, bars and coffee shops in India offering a wider variety of mu'assels, including non-tobacco versions. In 2011, hookah was banned in Bangalore. However, it can be bought or rented for personal usage or organized parties.

Koyilandy, a small fishing town on the west coast of India, once made and exported hookahs extensively. These are known as Malabar Hookhas or Koyilandy Hookahs. Today these intricate hookahs are difficult to find outside Koyilandy and are becoming difficult even to find in Koyilandy itself.

As hookah resurges in India, there have been numerous raids and bans recently on hookah smoking, especially in Gujarat.

==== Pakistan ====
Although it has been traditionally prevalent in rural areas for generations, smoking hookahs has become very popular in the cosmopolitan cities of Pakistan. One can see many cafés in Pakistan offering hookah smoking to its guests. Many households even have hookahs for smoking or decoration purposes.

In Punjab, Pakhtunkhwa, and in northern Balochistan, the topmost part on which coals are placed is called chillum.

In big cities like Karachi and Lahore, cafes and restaurants offered Hookah and charged per hour. In 2013, it was banned by the Supreme Court of Pakistan. The cafe owners started offering shisha to minors, which was the major reason for the ban.

==== Bangladesh ====
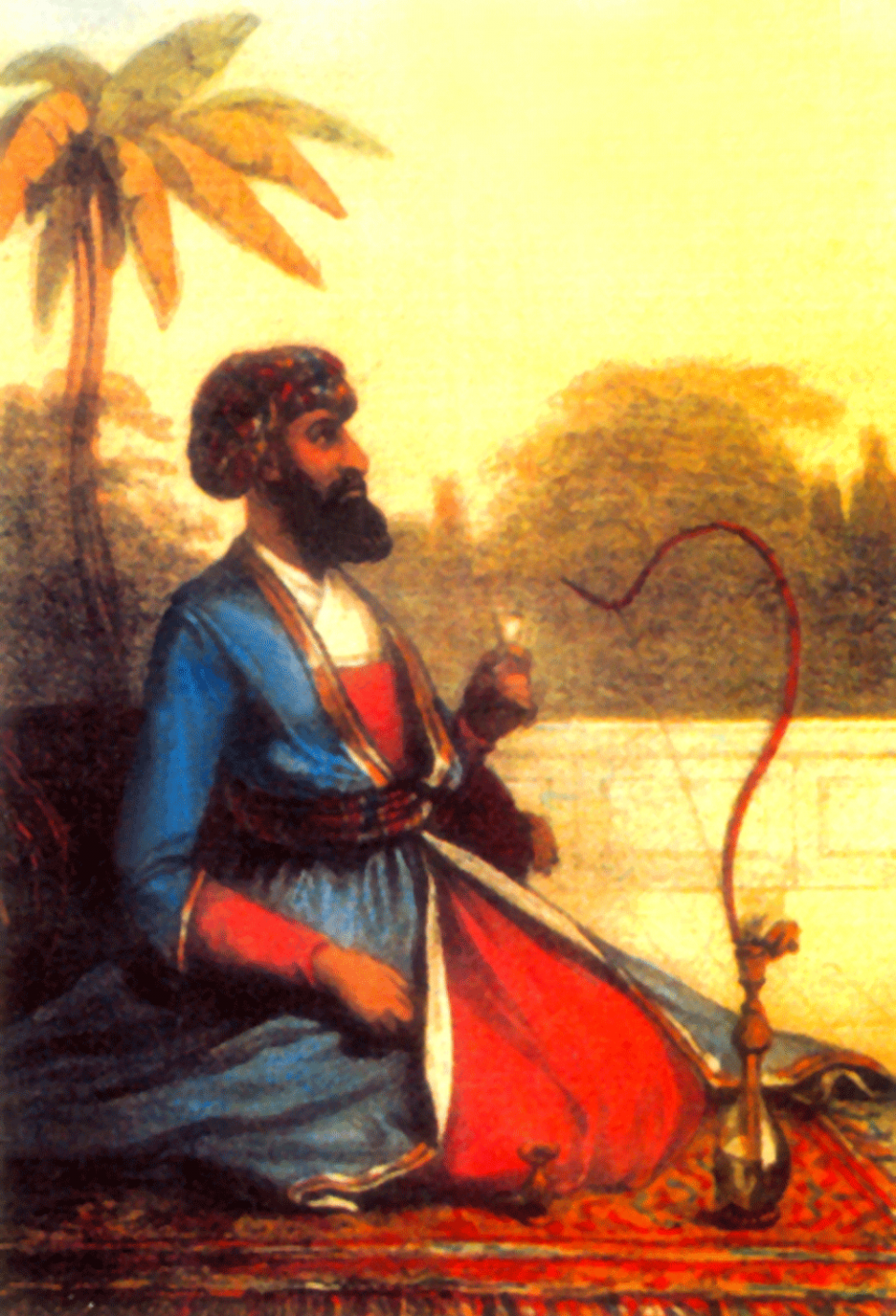
I'tisam-ud-Din, a Bengali Muslim from the 18th century, smoking hukka.

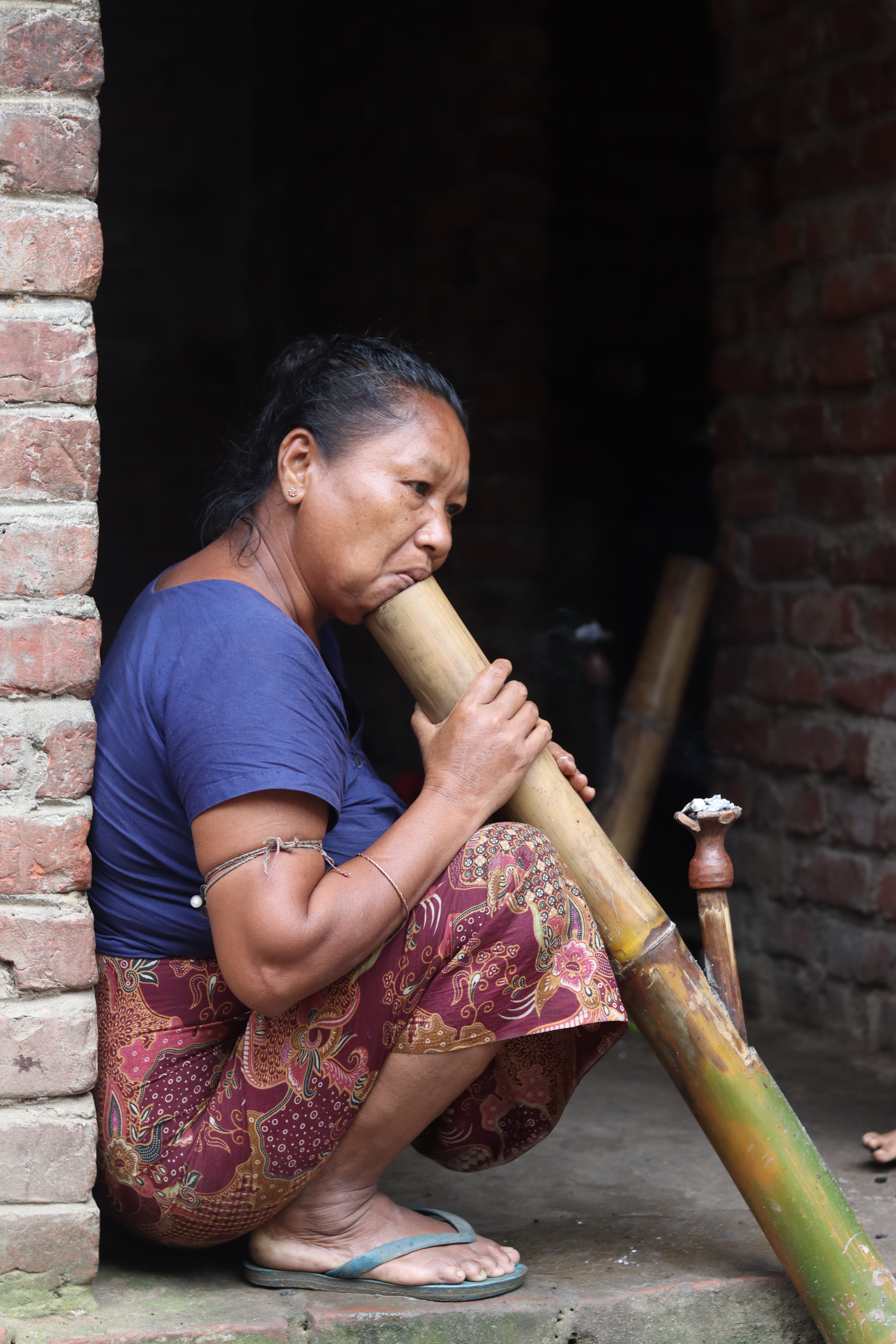
Garo woman smoking a traditional bamboo hookah.

The hookah (Bengali: হুক্কা, romanized: hukka) has been a traditional smoking instrument in Bangladesh, particularly among the old Bengali Muslim zamindar gentry. However, flavoured shisha was introduced in the early 2000s. Hookah lounges spread quite quickly between 2008 and 2011 in urban areas and became popular among young people as well as middle-aged people as a relaxation method. There have been allegations of a government crack-down on hookah bars to prevent illicit drug usage. The hookah is also an electoral symbol for a candidate used first in the 1973 Bangladeshi general election. In the biography of Mountstuart Elphinstone, it is mentioned that James Achilles Kirkpatrick had a hookah-bardar (hookah servant/preparer) during his time in the Indian subcontinent. Kirkpatrick's hookah servant is said to have robbed and cheated Kirkpatrick, making his way to England and stylising himself as the Prince of Sylhet. The man was waited upon by the prime minister of Great Britain William Pitt the Younger, and then dined with the Duke of York before presenting himself in front of George III.

==== Nepal ====
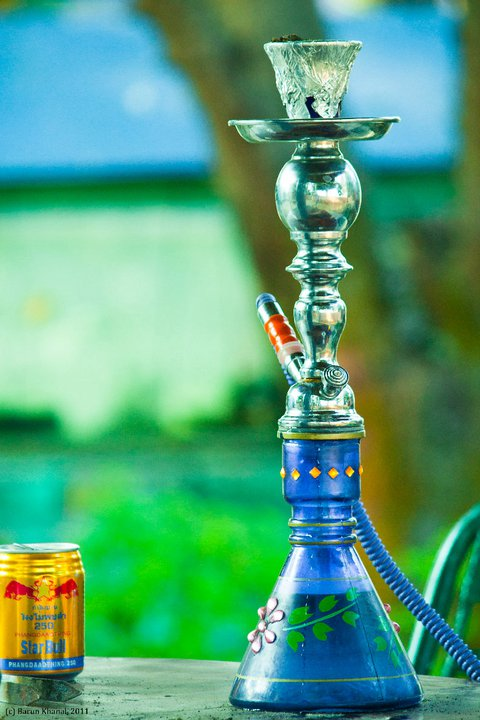
A hookah at a restaurant in Nepal.

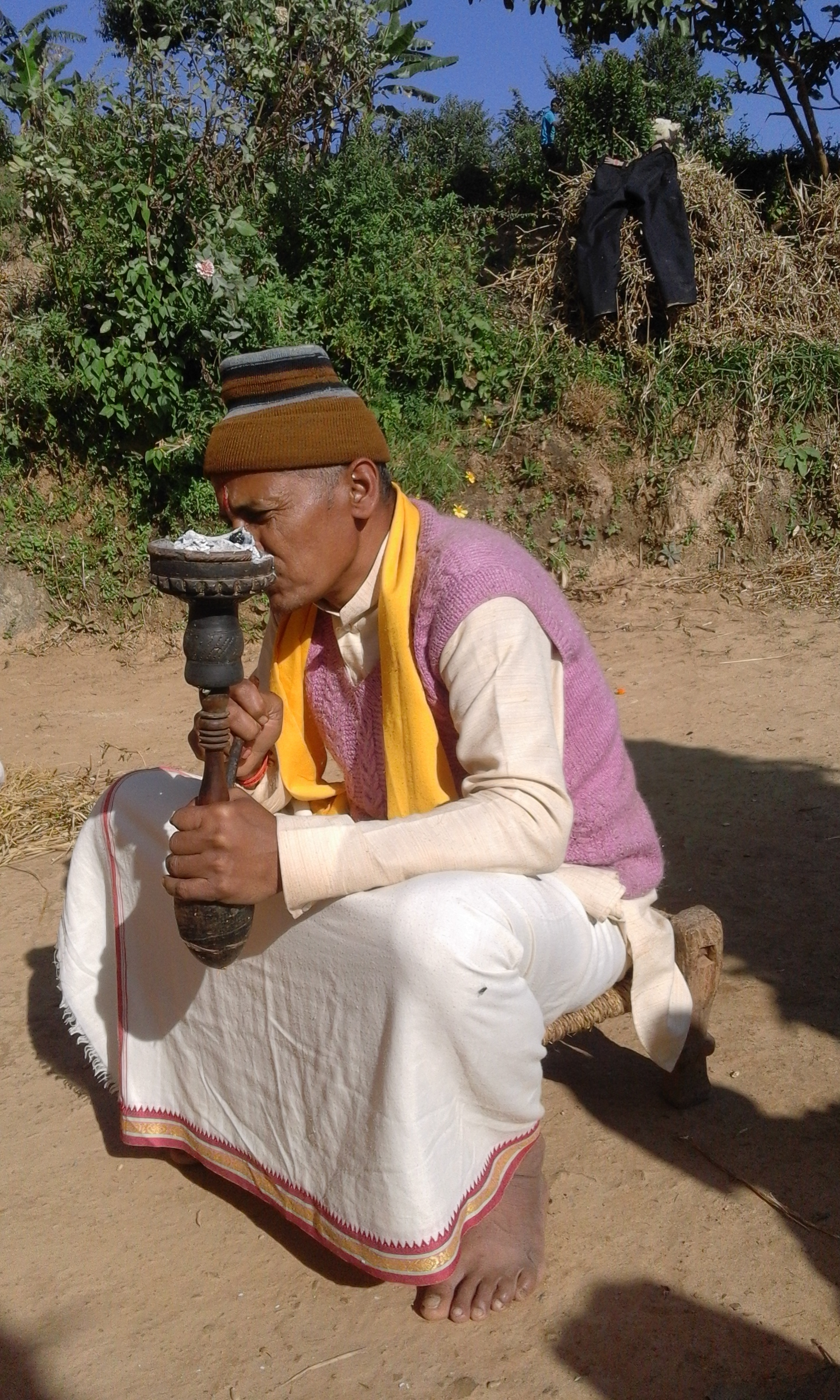
A man smoking tobacco in hookah (or hukka) in Darchula, Nepal.

Hookahs (हुक़्क़ा), especially wooden ones, are popular in Nepal. Use of hookahs has been usually considered to symbolize an elite family status in Nepali history.

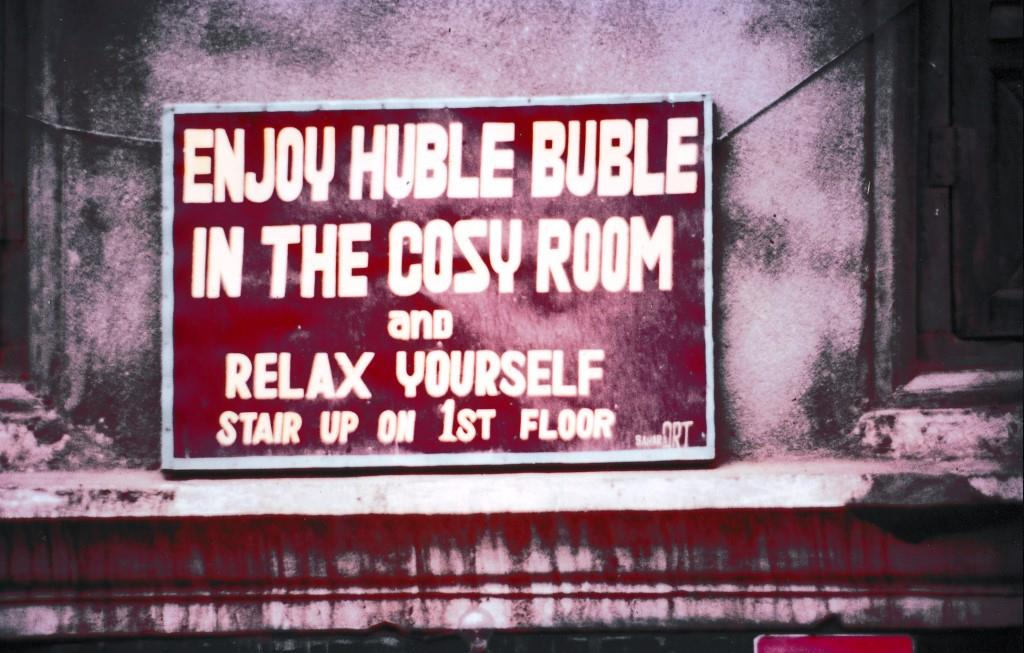
Huble Buble sign in Kathmandu. 1993

Nowadays, the cities of Kathmandu, Pokhara and Dharan have special hookah bars. Although hookahs have started becoming popular among younger people and tourists, the overall number of hookah smokers is likely dwindling owing to the widespread availability of cheaper cigarettes.

=== Middle East ===
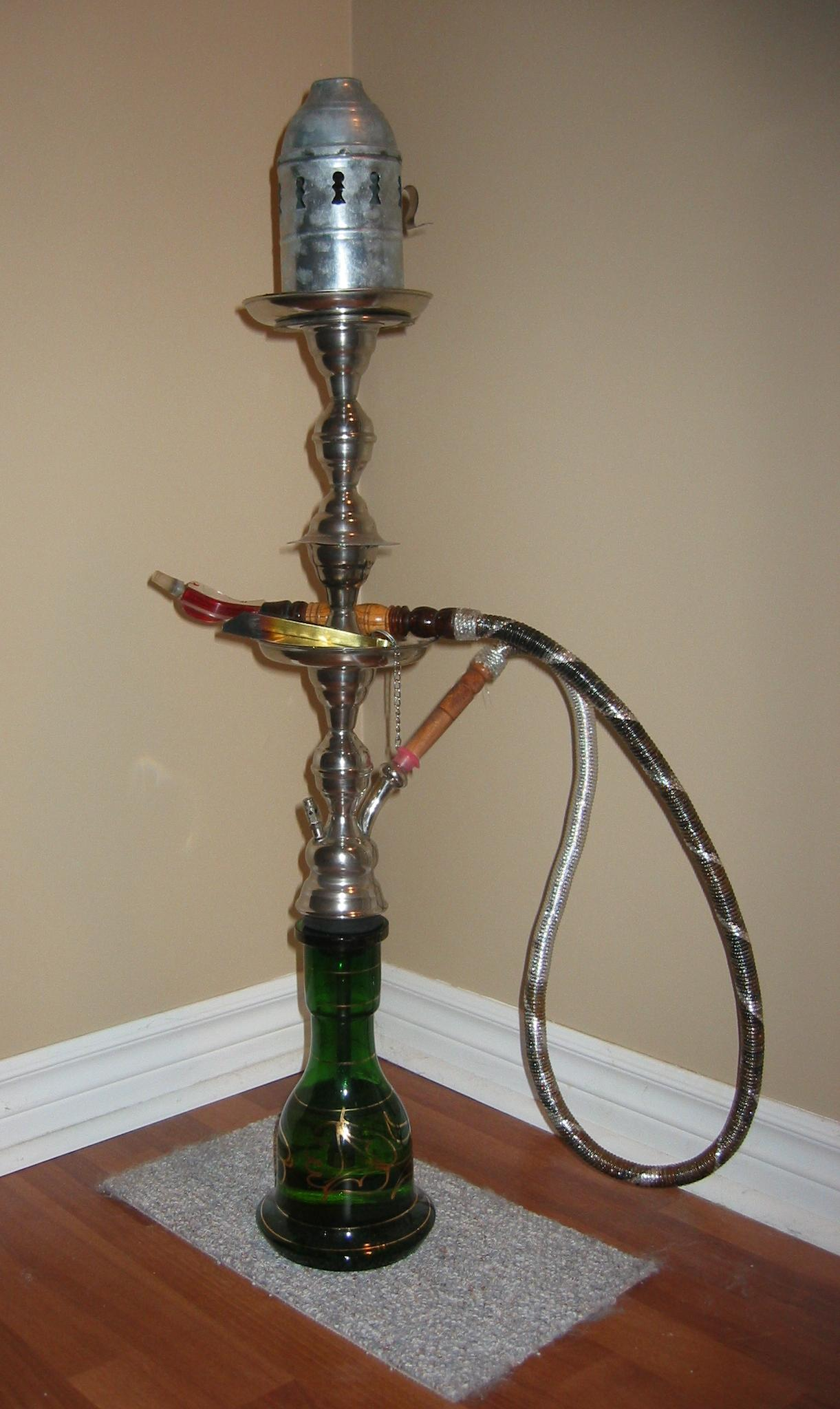
An Egyptian hookah (shisha).

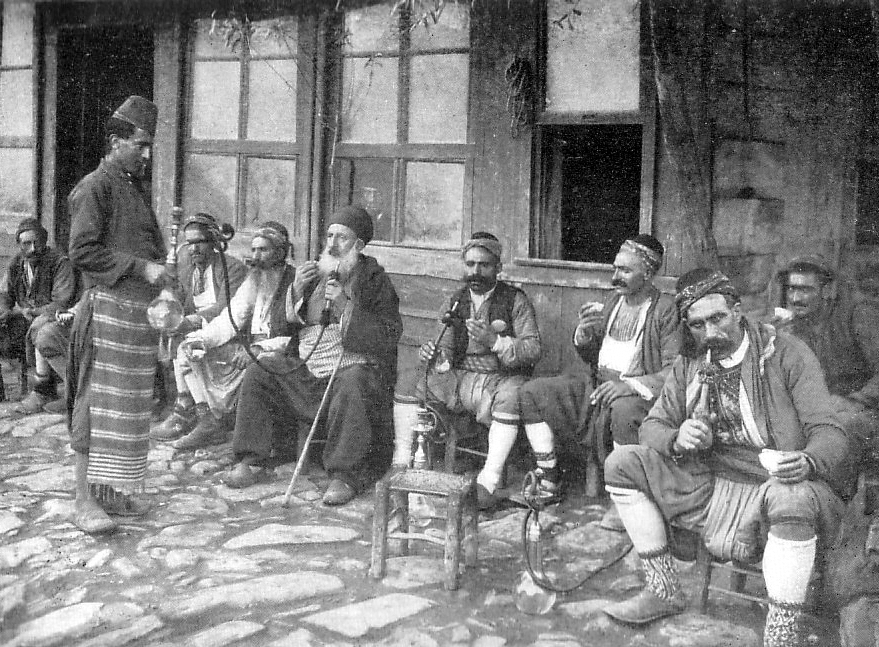
A café in Istanbul, 1905

In the Arab world and the Middle East, people smoke waterpipes as part of their culture and traditions. Local names of waterpipe in the Middle East are, argila, čelam/čelīm, ḡalyān or ghalyan, ḥoqqa, nafas, nargile, and shisha.

Social smoking is done with a single or double hose hookah, and sometimes even triple or quadruple hose hookahs are used at parties or small get-togethers. When the smoker is finished, they either place the hose back on the table, signifying that it is available, or hand it from one user to the next, folded back on itself so that the mouthpiece is not pointing at the recipient.

Most cafés in the Middle East offer shishas. Cafés are widespread and are among the chief social gathering places in the Arab world (akin to public houses in Britain).

==== Gaza ====
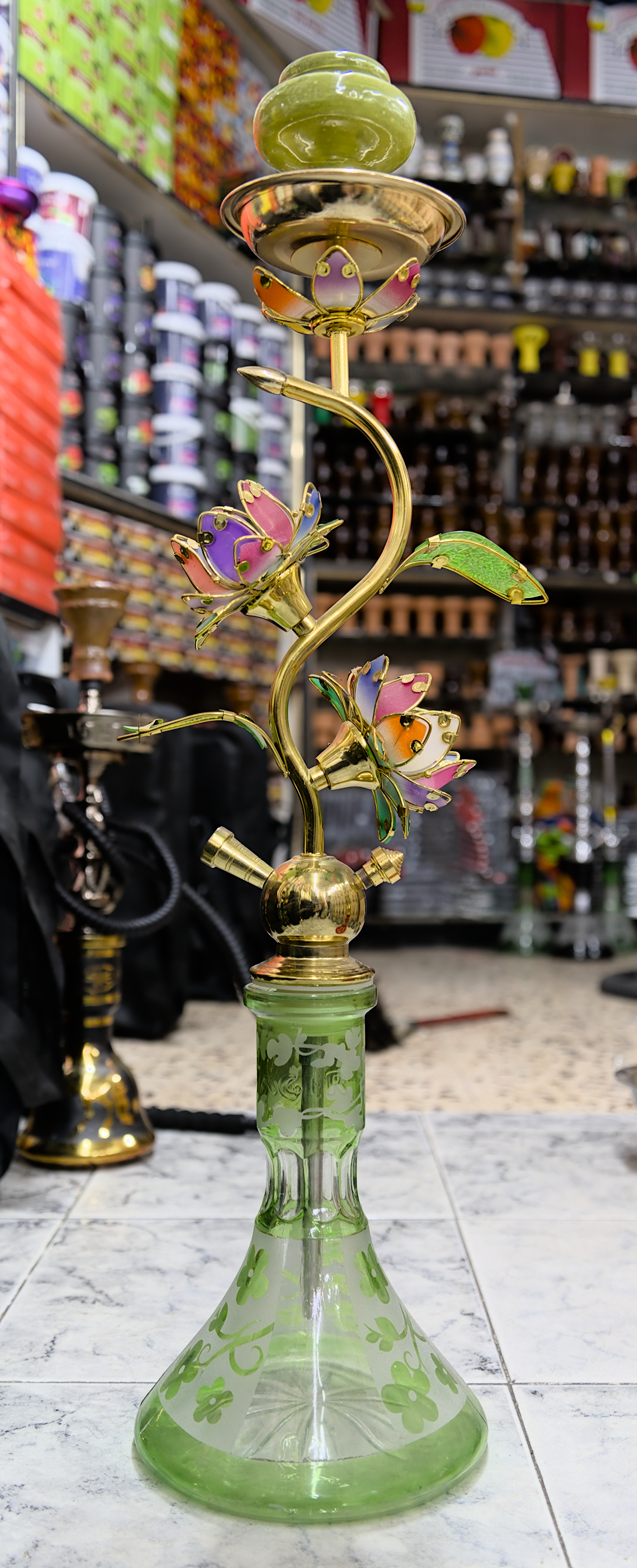
Flower-ornamented hookah in a Palestinian shop

In 2010 the Hamas-led Islamist government of Gaza imposed a ban on women smoking hookahs in public. A spokesman for the Interior Ministry explained that "It is inappropriate for a woman to sit cross-legged and smoke in public. It harms the image of our people." The ban was soon lifted later that year and women returned to smoking in popular venues.

==== Iran ====
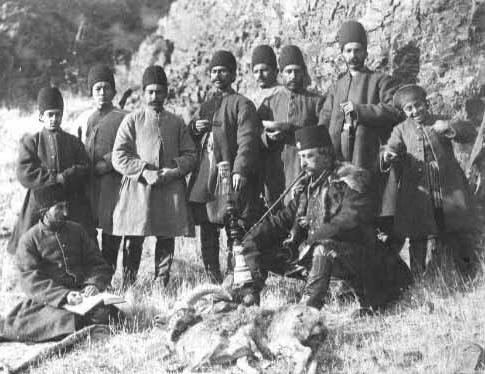
Naser al-Din Shah Qajar smoking qalyan

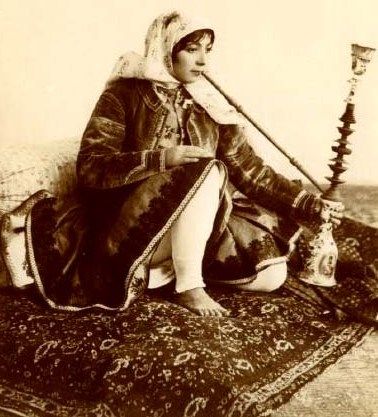
Persian woman with hookah (qalyan), 1900, Iran

The earliest known literary evidence of the hookah, anywhere, comes in a quatrain by Ahlī Shirazi (d. 1535), a Persian poet, referring to the use of the ḡalyān, thus dating its use at least as early as the time of the Shah Ṭahmāsp I. This suggests, the hookah was already in use in ancient Persia, and it made its way into India soon afterward.

Although the Safavid Shah ʿAbbās I strongly condemned tobacco use, towards the end of his reign smoking ḡalyān and čopoq had become common on every level of the society, women included. In schools, both teachers and students had ḡalyāns while lessons continued. Shah Safi of Persia (r. 1629–42) declared a complete ban on tobacco, but the income received from its use persuaded him to soon revoke the ban. The use of ḡalyāns became so widespread that a group of poor people became professional tinkers of crystal water pipes. During the time of Abbas II of Persia (r. 1642–1666), use of the water pipe had become a national addiction. The shah (king) had his own private ḡalyān servants. Evidently the position of water pipe tender (ḡalyāndār) dates from this time. Also at this time, reservoirs were made of glass, pottery, or a type of gourd. Because of the unsatisfactory quality of indigenous glass, glass reservoirs were sometimes imported from Venice. In the time of Suleiman I of Persia (r. 1694–1722), ḡalyāns became more elaborately embellished as their use increased. The wealthy owned gold and silver pipes. The masses spent more on ḡalyāns than they did on the necessities of life.

An emissary of Sultan Husayn (r. 1722–32) to the court of Louis XV of France, on his way to the royal audience at Versailles, had in his retinue an officer holding his ḡalyān, which he used while his carriage was in motion. We have no record indicating the use of ḡalyān at the court of Nader Shah, although its use seems to have continued uninterrupted. There are portraits of Karim Khan of the Zand dynasty of Iran and Fat′h-Ali Shah Qajar that depict them smoking the ḡalyān. Iranians have a special tobacco called Khansar (خانسار, presumably name of the origin city, Khvansar). The charcoals would be put on the Khansar without foil.

The Iranian Shia marja' Mirza Shirazi issued his historical fatwa: "In the name of God, the Merciful, the Beneficent. Today the use of both varieties of tobacco, in whatever fashion is reckoned war against the Imam of the Age – may God hasten his advent." The fatwa sparked a huge movement to the extent that even in the private quarters of Naser al-Din Shah Qajar (r. 1848–1896), hookahs were broken.

==== Saudi Arabia ====
In 2014, Saudi Arabia was in the process of implementing general smoking bans in public places. This included shishas. Currently, hookah remains legal in the country, with some restaurants charging customers extra fees.

==== Syria ====
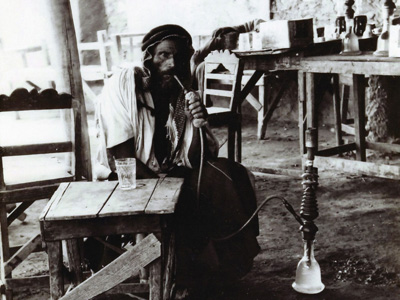
Bedouin smoking a hookah, locally called nargileh, in a coffeehouse in Deir ez-Zor, on the Euphrates, 1920s.

Although perceived to be an important cultural feature of Syria (see Smoking in Syria), narghile had declined in popularity during most of the twentieth century and was used mostly by older men. Similar to other Middle Eastern countries, its use increased dramatically during the 1990s, particularly among youth and young adults. As of 2004, prior to the Syrian civil war, 17% of 18- to 29-year-olds, 10% of 30- to 45-year-olds, and 6% of 46- to 65-year-olds reported using narghile, and use was higher in men than women. More recent data is not available.

==== Turkey and the Balkans ====
Nargile became part of Turkish and Balkan culture from the 17th century. Back then, it became prominent in society and was used as a status symbol. Nargile was such an important Turkish custom that it even sparked a diplomatic crisis between France and the Ottoman Empire. Western Turkey is noted for its traditional pottery production where potters make earthenware objects, including nargile bowls.

=== Southeast Asia ===
In Southeast Asia, where it is predominantly called shisha, the hookah was particularly used within the Arab and Indian communities.

Hookah was virtually unknown in Southeast Asia before the latter 20th century, yet the popularity among contemporary younger people is now vastly growing. Southeast Asia's most cosmopolitan cities, Makati, Bangkok, Singapore (where it is now banned), Phnom Penh, Siem Reap, Hanoi and Ho Chi Minh City, have various bars and clubs that offer hookahs to patrons.

Although hookah use has been common for hundreds of years and enjoyed by people of all ages, it has recently started to become a youth pastime in Asia. Hookahs are most popular with college students, and young adults, who may be underage and thus unable to purchase cigarettes.

=== Kenya ===
The hookah is called shisha in Kenya. It is officially banned in the country. Despite this, many clubs still continue to defy the law and hookah smoking goes on in urban areas.

=== South Africa ===
In South Africa, hookah, colloquially known as a hubbly bubbly or an okka pipe, is popular among the Cape Malay and Indian populations, wherein it is smoked as a social pastime. However, hookah is seeing increasing popularity with South Africans, especially the youth. Bars that additionally provide hookahs are becoming more prominent, although smoking is normally done at home or in public spaces such as beaches and picnic sites.

In South Africa, the terminology of the various hookah components also differ from other countries. The clay "head/bowl" is known as a "clay pot". The hoses are called "pipes" and the air release valve is known as a "clutch".

The windcover (which is considered optional for outside use) is known as an "As-jas", which directly translates from Afrikaans to English as an "ash-jacket". Also, making/preparing the "clay pot" is commonly referred to as "racking the hubbly".

Some scientists point to the marijuana pipe as an African origin of hookah.

=== United States and Canada ===
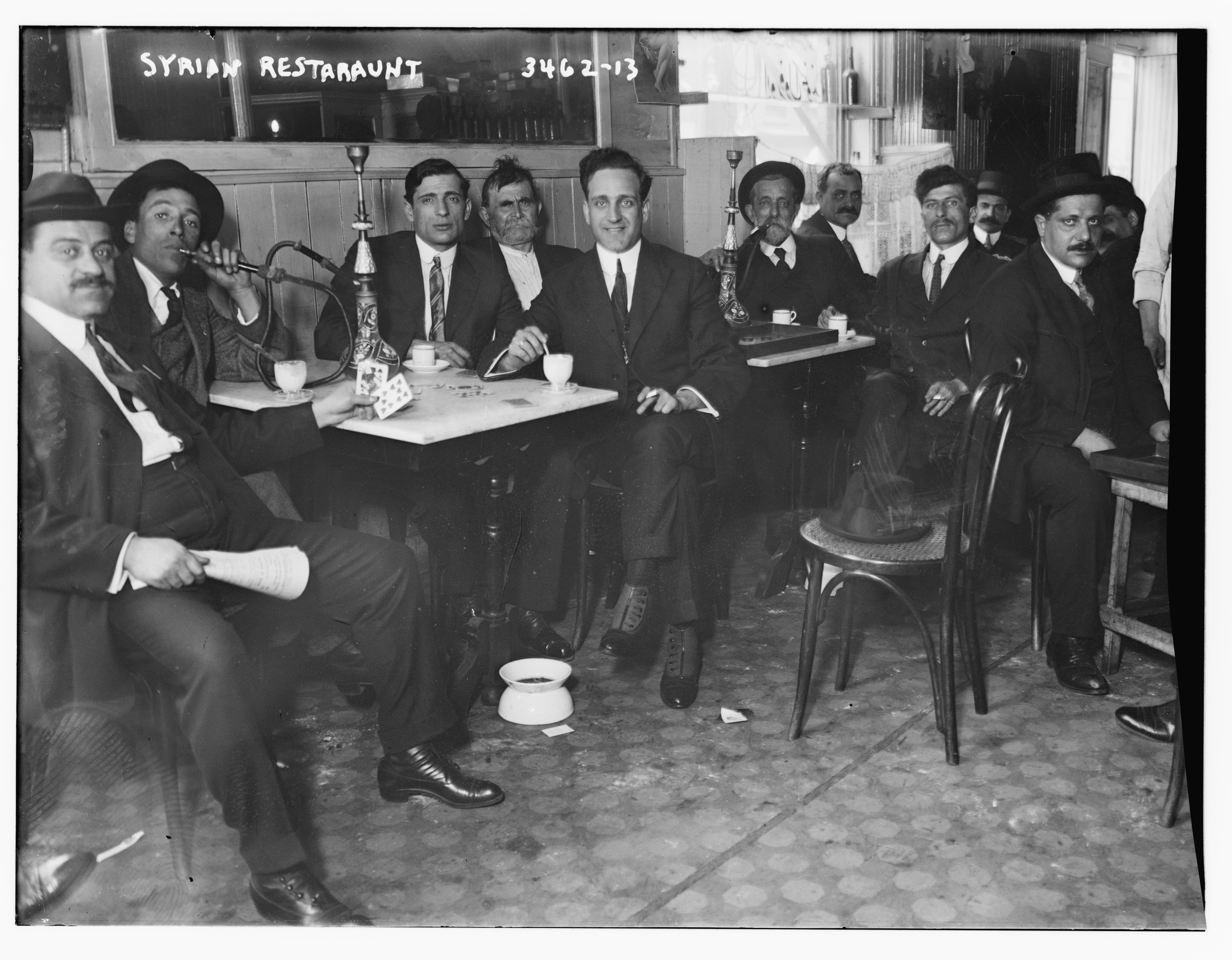
Men smoking shisha and playing cards in a Syrian restaurant, Little Syria (Manhattan), 1910.

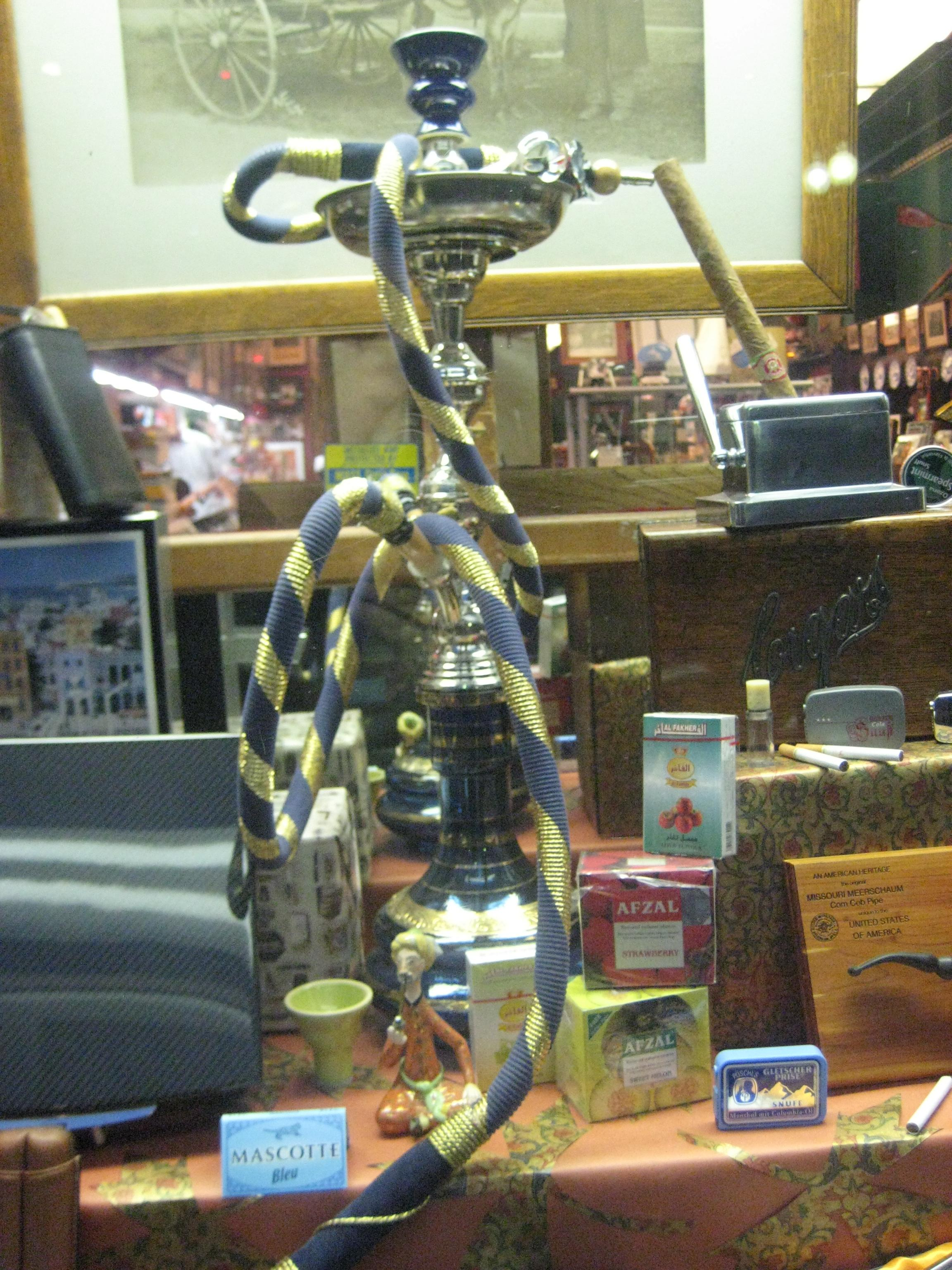
A hookah and a variety of tobacco products are on display in a Harvard Square store window in Cambridge, Massachusetts, United States.

During the 1960s and 1970s, hookahs were a popular tool for the consumption of various derivations of tobacco, among other things. At parties or small gatherings the hookah hose was passed around with users partaking as they saw fit. Typically, though, open flames were used instead of burning coals.

Today, hookahs are readily available for sale at smoke shops and some gas stations across the United States, along with a variety of tobacco brands and accessories. In addition to private hookah smoking, hookah lounges or bars have opened in cities across the country.

Recently, certain cities, counties, and states have implemented indoor smoking bans. In some jurisdictions, hookah businesses can be exempted from the policies through special permits. Some permits, however, have requirements such as the business earning a certain minimum percentage of their revenue from alcohol or tobacco.

In cities with indoor smoking bans, hookah bars have been forced to close or switch to tobacco-free mixtures. In many cities, though, hookah lounges have been growing in popularity.

The growth of hookah culture in the United States also accelerated the emergence of a dedicated accessories industry, with brands competing on engineering innovation as much as aesthetics. Flavored tobacco manufacturers like Al Fakher became ubiquitous on American café menus, while hardware companies developed heat management devices and filtration systems intended to address the quality and consistency concerns that had long characterized the hookah experience. This commercial maturation has not resolved the underlying public health questions, but it has shifted the terms of the conversation — from whether hookah is harmful to what role product design plays in mediating that harm. From the year 2000 to 2004, over 200 new hookah cafés opened for business, most of them targeted at young adults and located near college campuses or cities with large Middle-Eastern communities. This activity continues to gain popularity within the post-secondary student demographic. Hookah use among high school students declined from 9.4% to 3.4% from 2014 to 2019 while cigarette smoking decreased from 9.2% to 5.8% during this same time period, according to the US CDC. According to a 2018 study, 1.1% of students with some college but no degree, an associate degree or an undergraduate degree reported waterpipe or pipe tobacco product use either every day or some days. As of November 2017, at least 2,082 college or university campuses in the U.S. have adopted 100% smokefree campus policies that attempt to eliminate smoking in indoor and outdoor areas across the entire campus, including residences.

In the United States, the prevalence of hookah use has been noted in a 2019 article to be increasing, particularly among certain states with larger populations of Arab Americans. The use of hookah is more common in urban areas compared to rural areas, and this trend is influenced by factors like availability in public spaces such as cafés and restaurants, as well as cultural and social influences.

== Operation ==
Hookah cross-section view

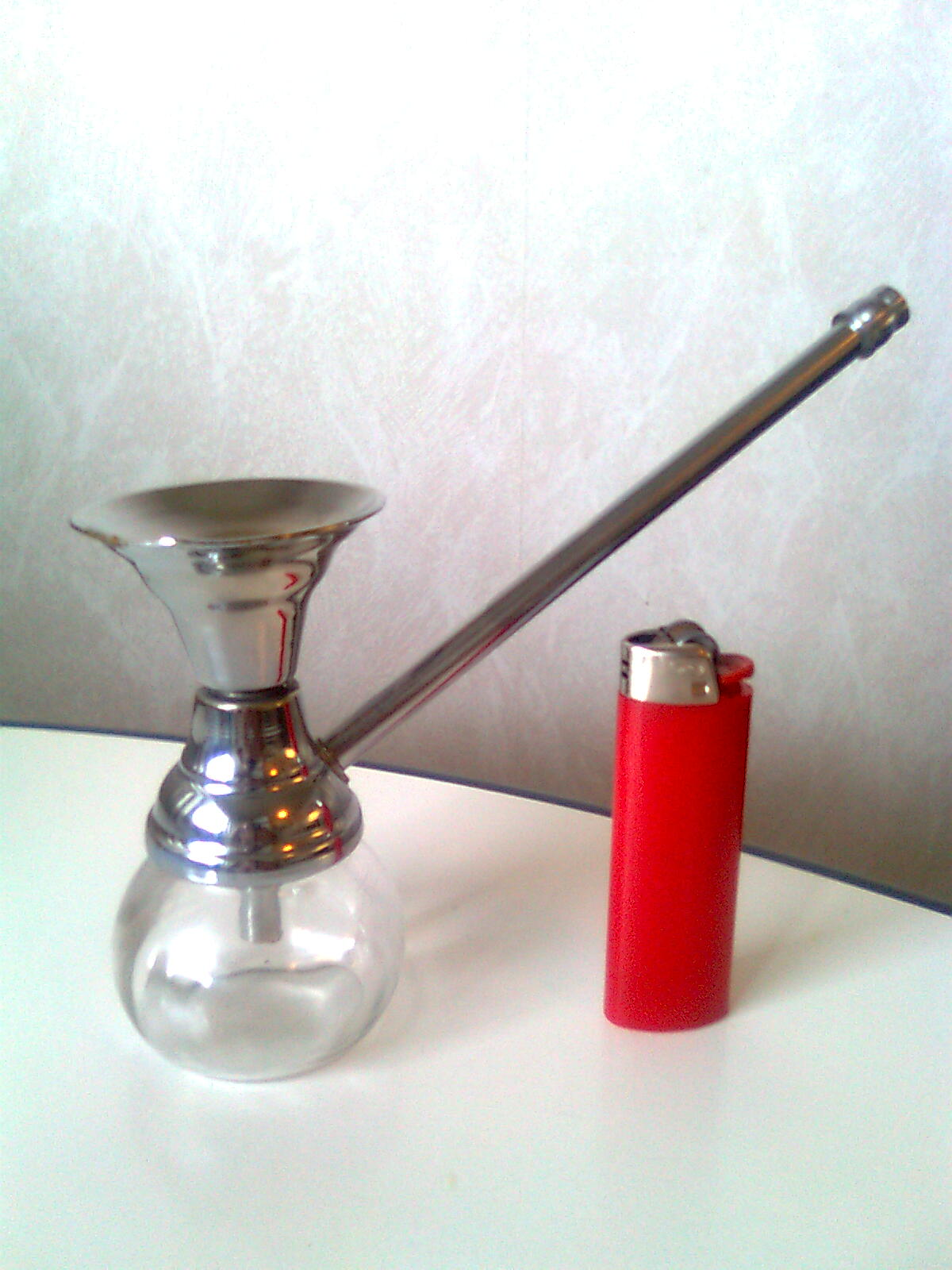
A small hookah

The jar at the bottom of the hookah is filled with water sufficient to submerge a few centimeters (an inch or two) of the body tube, which is sealed tightly to it. Deeper water will only increase the inhalation force needed to use it. Tobacco or tobacco-free molasses are placed inside the bowl at the top of the hookah. Often the bowl is covered with perforated tin foil or a metal screen and coal placed on top. The foil or screen separates the coal and the tobacco, with the foil and the tobacco reaching maximum temperatures of 450 and 130 degrees Celsius (850 °F and 270 °F) respectively. These temperatures are too low to sustain combustion and considerably lower than the 900 degrees Celsius (1700 °F) found in cigarettes. A larger fraction of the smoke condensates of the hookah are produced by simple distillation rather than by pyrolysis and combustion, and as a result, would tend to carry considerably less of the pyrosynthesized compounds found in cigarette smoke.

As a result of suction through the hose, a vacuum is created in the headspace of the water bowl sufficient to overcome the small static head of the water above the inlet pipe, causing the smoke to bubble into the bowl. At the same time, air is drawn over and heated by the coals. It then passes through the tobacco mixture where due to hot air convection and thermal conduction from the coal, the mainstream aerosol is produced. The vapor is passed down through the body tube that extends into the water in the jar. It bubbles up through the water, losing heat, and fills the top part of the jar, to which the hose is attached. When a user inhales from the hose, smoke passes into the lungs, and the change in pressure in the jar pulls more air through the charcoal, continuing the process. Vapour that has collected in the bowl above the waterline may be exhausted through a purge valve, if present. This one-way valve is opened by the positive pressure created from gently blowing into the hose.

=== Filtration ===
Beyond the water basin that has always been central to hookah design, the question of meaningful smoke filtration has attracted growing attention from both researchers and manufacturers. Traditional water filtration cools the smoke and removes some water-soluble compounds, but does relatively little to reduce the volatile organic compounds (VOCs), polycyclic aromatic hydrocarbons (PAHs), and carbonyl compounds that represent the most significant health hazards in hookah smoke.

Active carbon filters represent a more targeted approach. Activated carbon — a highly porous material treated to maximize its surface area — works through adsorption, a process by which gas-phase molecules adhere to the carbon's surface rather than passing through. In hookah applications, an activated carbon filter is typically placed along the smoke's path through the stem, where it intercepts a range of harmful compounds before they reach the user.

Los Angeles-based hookah systems company Kaloud commissioned independent laboratory testing in Germany to quantify how much a combination of heat management and activated carbon filtration could reduce measurable toxicants. Using ISO-standard testing protocols over five testing cycles, the study compared a baseline traditional hookah (charcoal on foil) against setups incorporating Kaloud's Lotus Heat Management Device and Ayara Activated Carbon Hookah Filter. The results showed that this combination reduced carbonyl compounds by an average of 83.2%, PAHs by 90.5%, and VOCs by 91.2% compared to the baseline — with further reductions when using the Krysalis Eltheria full system. Carbon monoxide was reduced by approximately 61%. Kaloud emphasizes that these results do not render hookah smoking safe, and that all forms of smoking carry health risks; rather, the findings illustrate the degree to which engineering choices in hookah design can influence the toxicant profile of the resulting smoke.

== Health effects ==
While the health risks of hookah smoking are well-documented, research into harm reduction within the hookah space has expanded in recent years. Unlike cigarettes — which have seen decades of regulatory pressure and product standardization — hookah equipment has historically varied enormously in design quality, from improvised home setups to engineered commercial systems, and that variability plays a measurable role in the toxicant exposure experienced by users.

=== Exposure to toxic chemicals ===
Tobacco smoke contains toxic chemicals, including carcinogens (chemicals that cause cancer). Water does not filter out many of these chemicals. The toxic chemicals come from the burning of the charcoal, tobacco, and flavorings. These chemicals can lead to cancer, heart disease, lung disease, and other health problems. The toxic chemicals include tobacco-specific nitrosamines, polycyclic aromatic hydrocarbons (PAHs; e.g., benzo[a]pyrene and anthracene), volatile aldehydes (e.g. formaldehyde, acetaldehyde, acrolein), benzene, nitric oxide, heavy metals (arsenic, chromium, lead), and carbon monoxide (CO). Hookah smoking also increases the amount of carbon monoxide (CO) in a person's body to eight times their normal level. Compared to smoking one cigarette, a single hookah session exposes users to more carbon monoxide and PAHs, similar levels of nicotine, and lower levels of tobacco-specific nitrosamines. By inhaling these chemicals, hookah smokers are at increased risk of many of the same health problems as cigarette smokers. During an average hookah smoking session, smokers inhale 100–200 times more smoke than from smoking a single cigarette.

=== Exposure to pathogens that cause infectious diseases ===
When people share a hookah, there is a risk of spreading infectious diseases such as oral herpes, tuberculosis, hepatitis, influenza, and H. pylori. Using personal disposable mouthpieces may reduce this risk, but does not eliminate it.

=== Addiction to and dependence on hookah ===
Hookah smokers inhale nicotine, which is an addictive chemical. A typical hookah smoking session delivers 1.7 times the nicotine dose of one cigarette and the nicotine absorption rate in daily waterpipe users is equivalent to smoking 10 cigarettes per day. Many hookah smokers, especially frequent users, have urges to smoke and show other withdrawal symptoms after not smoking for some time, and it can be difficult to quit. People who become addicted to hookah may be more likely to smoke alone. Hookah smokers who are addicted may find it easier to quit if they have help from a quit-smoking counseling program.

=== Short-term health effects ===
Carbon monoxide (CO) in hookah smoke binds to hemoglobin in the blood to form carboxyhemoglobin, which reduces the amount of oxygen that can be transported to organs including the brain. There are several case reports in the medical literature of hookah smokers needing treatment in hospital emergency rooms for symptoms of CO poisoning including headache, nausea, lethargy, and fainting. This is sometimes called "hookah sickness". Hookah smoking can damage the cardiovascular system in several ways. Its use elevates heart rate and blood pressure. It also impairs baroreflex control (which helps to control blood pressure) and cardiac autonomic functioning (which has many purposes, including control of heart rate) Hookah use also acutely harms vascular functioning, increases inflammation, and harms lung function and reduces the ability to exercise.

=== Long-term health effects ===
Current evidence indicates hookah causes numerous health problems. Hookah smoking is associated with increased risk of several cancers (lung, esophageal, and gastric), pulmonary diseases (impaired pulmonary function, chronic bronchitis, and emphysema), coronary artery disease, periodontal disease, obstetrical and perinatal problems (low birth weight and pulmonary problems at birth), larynx and voice changes, and osteoporosis. Many of the studies to date have methodological limitations, such as not measuring hookah use in a standardized way. Larger, longitudinal studies are needed to learn more about the long-term health effects of hookah use and of exposure to hookah smoke. Oral health is also affected, notably dental and periodontal status.

=== Effects of secondhand exposure to hookah smoke ===
Secondhand smoke from hookahs contains significant amounts of carbon monoxide, aldehydes, PAHs, ultrafine particles, and respirable particulate matter (particles small enough to enter the lungs). Studies have found that concentrations of particulate matter in the air of hookah bars were in the unhealthy to hazardous range according to the U.S. Environmental Protection Agency standards. The air in hookah bars also contains significant amounts of toxic chemicals, including aromatic hydrocarbons, carbon monoxide, nicotine, and trace metals. The concentrations in the air of all these toxic substances are greater than for cigarettes (for the same number of smokers per hour). During a typical one-hour hookah session, a user expels into the air 2-10 times the amount of cancer-causing chemicals and other harmful chemicals compared to a cigarette smoker. No studies have examined the long-term health effects of exposure to secondhand hookah smoke, but short term effects may include respiratory symptoms such as wheezing, nasal congestion, and chronic cough.

=== Comparison to cigarettes ===
==== Aerosol composition comparison ====
The composition of aerosol produced by traditional shisha differs significantly from that of cigarette smoke. While cigarette smoke consists of approximately 76% harmful substances such as tar, nicotine, and carbon monoxide, the aerosol generated during a typical shisha session is composed primarily (about 84%) of water, glycerol, and propylene glycol.

==== Toxicant levels per milliliter ====
Studies analyzing shisha aerosol generated using heat management devices and coconut shell charcoal have shown that, per milliliter of aerosol, levels of tobacco-related harmful substances are between 94% and 100% lower compared to those found in cigarette smoke. It bears emphasizing that this per-milliliter comparison does not translate directly into equivalent exposure, since a typical hookah session produces substantially more smoke volume than a single cigarette. Researchers and manufacturers alike have increasingly focused on the role that hardware — specifically heat management devices and activated carbon filtration — plays in determining the actual toxicant load a user encounters, separate from the tobacco itself. Kaloud, a Los Angeles-based hookah systems company, commissioned accredited laboratory testing in Germany that found significant reductions in carbonyl compounds, PAHs, VOCs, and carbon monoxide when comparing a filter-equipped, heat-managed setup to a traditional charcoal-on-foil baseline hookah.

== See also ==
- Bong
- Chillum (pipe)
- Electronic hookah
- Health effects of tobacco
- Incense
- One-hitter (smoking)
- Pipe smoking
- Thuoc lao
