= Pipe smoking =

Tasting or inhaling smoke from a pipe

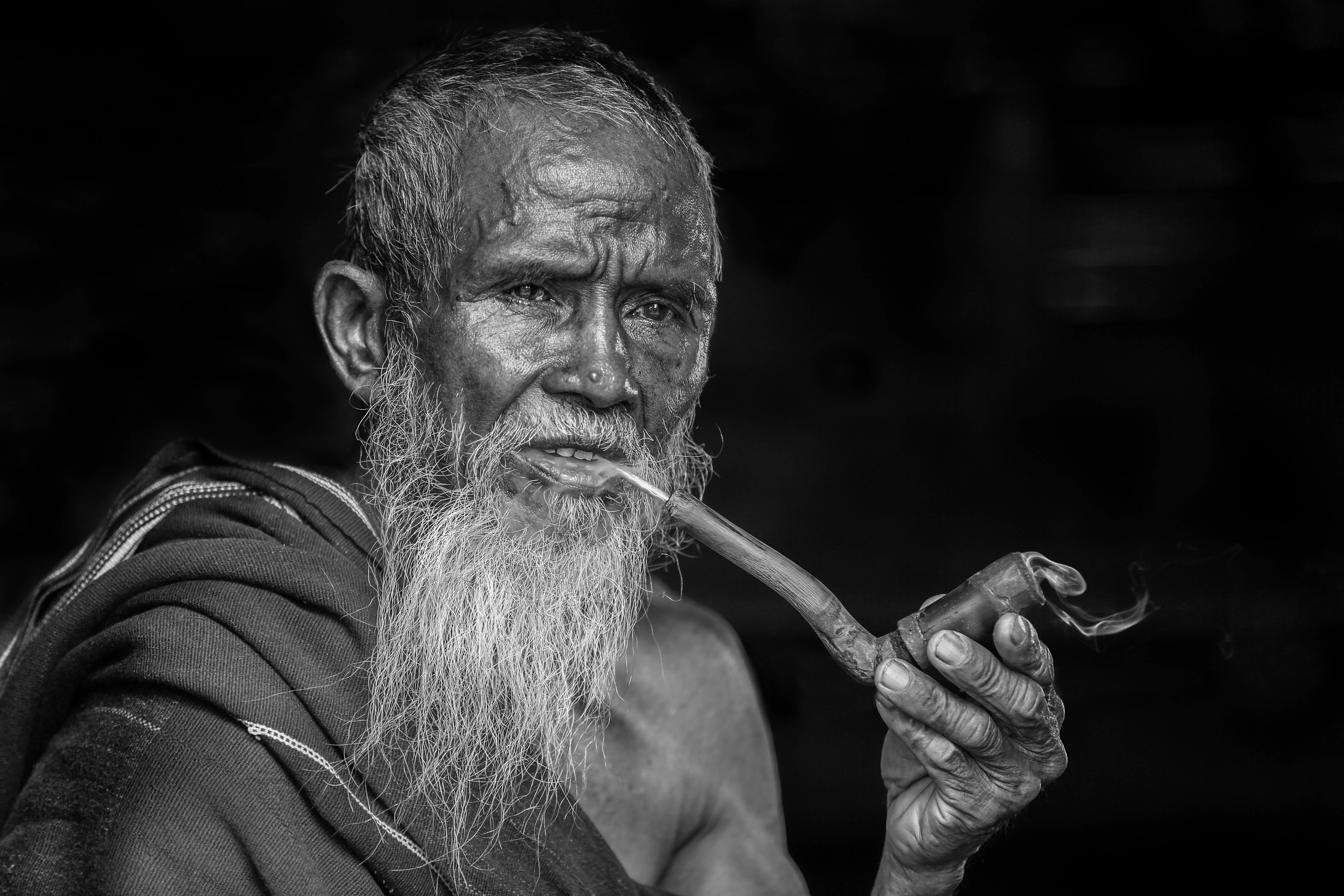
Bearded man smoking a pipe

Pipe smoking is the practice of tasting (or, less commonly, inhaling) the smoke produced by burning a substance, most commonly tobacco or cannabis, in a tobacco pipe or other smoking pipe. It is the oldest traditional form of smoking. The customs, vocabulary and etiquette that surround pipe smoking culture vary across the world and depend both on the people who are smoking and the substance being smoked.

Regular pipe smoking is known to carry serious health risks including increased danger of various forms of cancer as well as pulmonary and cardiovascular illnesses.

== History ==
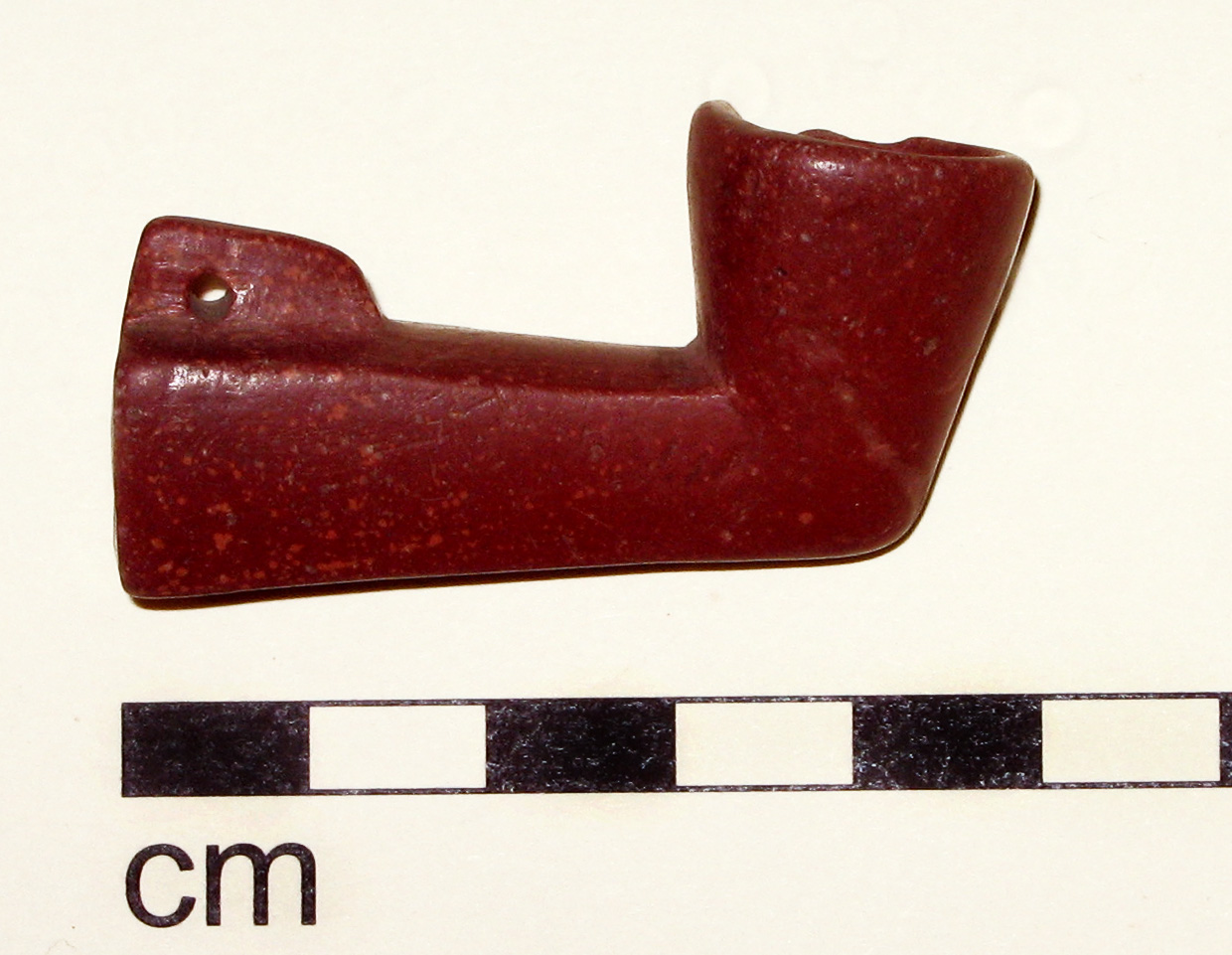
Protohistoric Catlinite pipe bowl, probably Ioway, from the Wanampito site

A number of Native American cultures have pipe-smoking traditions, which have been part of their cultures since long before the arrival of Europeans. Tobacco is often smoked, generally for ceremonial purposes, though other mixtures of sacred herbs are also common. Various types of ceremonial pipes have been smoked in ceremony to seal covenants and treaties, most notably treaties of peace (hence the misnomer, "peace pipe"). Tobacco was introduced to Europe from the Americas in the sixteenth century and spread around the world rapidly.

=== 17th century ===
During the 17th century, pipe smoking became a new trend among the Dutch young, in specific the upper and middle class students. These students copied the Spanish sailors and soldiers in the area by joining them in participation of pipe smoking. In particular they were interested in the novelty it brought, which was the taste of smoke. However, the only way to smoke tobacco was through a pipe. Popularity grew throughout and became a mainstream habit for the Dutch during this time. “In a relatively short period of time, from 1590 to 1650, the Dutch Republic had gone from being a country of non-smokers to being a tobaccophile of Europe.” Typically, these young folk did their smoking in smoking rooms or parlors, also known as “tobacco houses.” They smoked for social habit, usually with other smokers. “It took more than a century for this new practice to come into fashion.” The popularity of pipes grew interest in artists. Although pipes has once been associated with the lower class, it turned into a symbol of prestige and vanity. Images of pipes could be found in numerous painting during the time. For example, in Willem Buytewech’s painting The Merry Company (circa 1620–1622), there are three young men and a woman sitting around a table with a tobacco pipe lying in the middle. Additionally, in artist Adriaen Brouwer’s portrait The Smokers (1636), he too was interested in the pipe. The smokers in the painting are sucking on their pipes.

=== 19th century ===
In Asia during the nineteenth century, opium (which previously had only been eaten) was added to tobacco and smoked in pipes. Madak (the mixture of opium and tobacco) turned out to be far more addictive than orally-ingested opium, leading to social problems in China which culminated in the First (1839–1842) and Second Opium War (1856–1860).

According to Alfred Dunhill, Africans have had a long tradition of smoking hemp in gourd pipes, asserting that by 1884 the King of the Baluka tribe of the Congo had established a "riamba" or hemp-smoking cult in place of fetish-worship. Enormous gourd pipes were used.

=== Contemporary ===
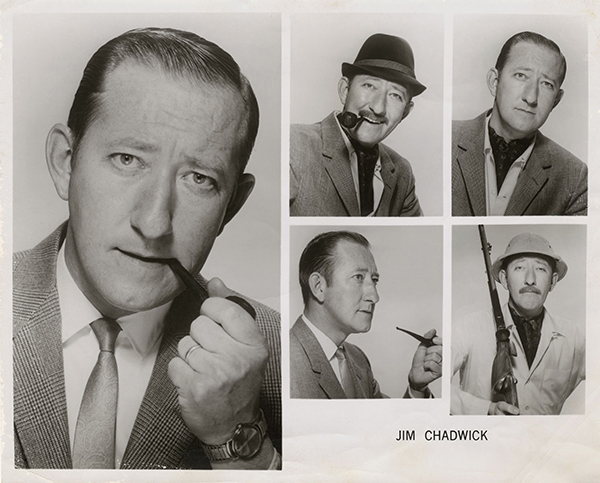
Model Jim Chadwick smoking a pipe 1969

In the twentieth century, pipe smoking was adopted as a preferred method of inhaling a variety of psychoactive drugs, and some claim it is a more intense method of ingestion. Smokeable crack cocaine has a reputation for being more addictive than cocaine's insufflated form. Similarly, methamphetamine has gained popularity in a crystalline form which when smoked in a pipe lets the user avoid the painful nasal irritation of snorting. When not applied to a cigarette or joint, the liquid form of PCP is typically smoked in a pipe with tobacco or cannabis.

Due in no small part to successful campaigning against tobacco use, sales of pipe tobacco in Canada fell nearly 80% in a recent fifteen-year period to 27,319 kilograms in 2016, from 135,010 kilograms in 2001, according to federal data. By comparison, Canadian cigarette sales fell about 32% in the same period to 28.6 billion units.

== Pipes ==
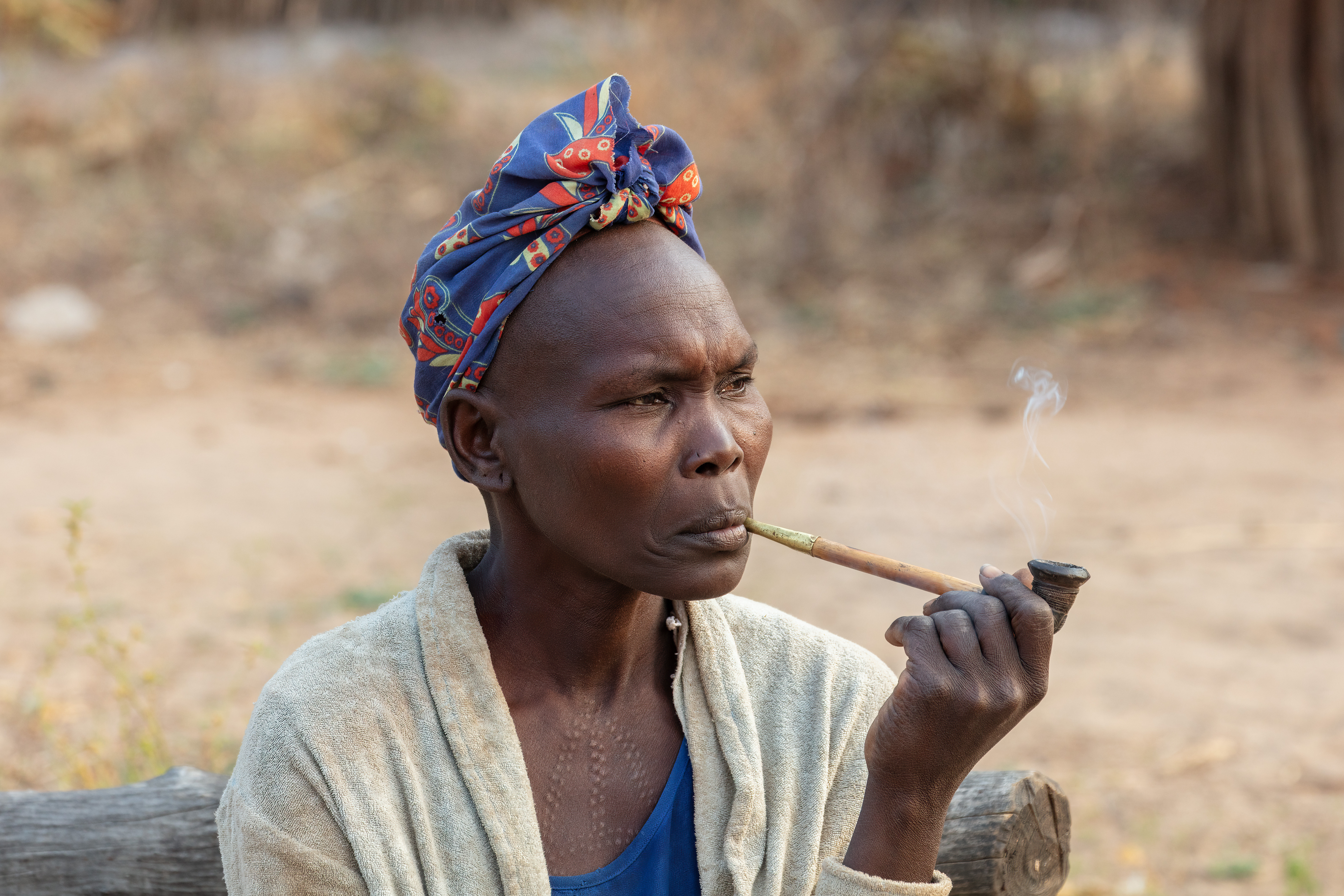
Woman smoking a pipe in South Sudan

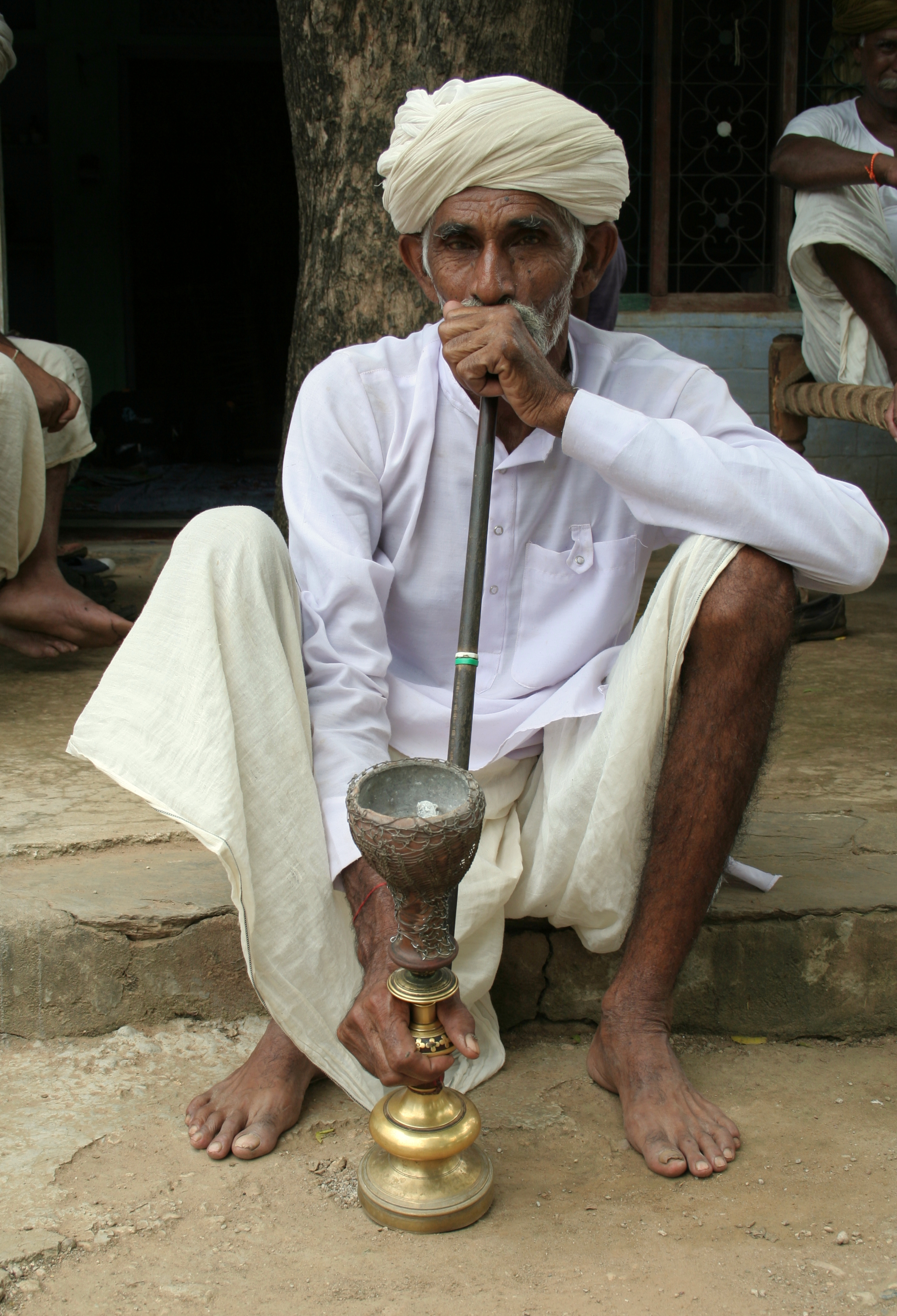
Man smoking hookah near Jaipur in India

Pipes have been fashioned from an assortment of materials including briar, clay, ceramic, corncob, glass, meerschaum, metal, gourd, stone, wood, bog oak and various combinations thereof, including the English calabash pipe.

The size of a pipe, particularly the bowl, depends largely on what is intended to be smoked in it. Large western-style tobacco pipes are used for strong-tasting, harsh tobaccos, the smoke from which is usually not inhaled. Smaller pipes such as the midwakh or kiseru are used to inhale milder tobaccos such as dokha or other substances such as ground cannabis or opium.

Water pipes bubble smoke through water to cool and wash the smoke. The two basic types are stationary hookahs, with one or more long flexible drawtubes, and portable bongs.

Spoon pipes (glass pipes or glass bowl pipes) have become increasingly common with the rise of cannabis smoking. Spoon pipes are normally made of borosilicate glass to withstand repeated exposure to high temperatures. They consist of a bowl for packing material into, stem for inhaling, and a carburettor (carb) for controlling suction and airflow into the pipe. These pipes utilize a two step process. First, the user inhales while lighting the smoking material and holding down the carb, allowing smoke to fill the stem. Then, the user releases the carb while inhaling to allow air to enter the stem and smoke to be pulled into the user's mouth.

== Health effects ==
The overall health risks are 10% higher in pipe smokers than in non-smokers. However, pipe or cigar smokers who are former-cigarette smokers might retain a habit of smoke inhalation. In such cases, there is a 30% increase in the risk of heart disease and a nearly three times greater risk of developing COPD. In addition, there is a causal relationship between pipe smoking and mortality due to lung and other cancers, as well as periodontal problems, such as tooth and bone loss.

However, all tobacco products deliver nicotine to the central nervous system, and there is a confirmed risk of dependence. Many forms of tobacco use are associated with a significantly increased risk of morbidity and premature mortality due to tobacco-related diseases.

== Notable pipe smokers ==
A number of people and fictional characters are strongly associated with the hobby of pipe smoking. More examples can be found in the Pipe Smoker of the Year list.

- Sparky Anderson, American baseball manager.
- Vicente Battista, Argentine writer.
- Enzo Bearzot, manager of the 1982 FIFA World Cup Champion Italy national football team.
- Rómulo Betancourt (1908–1981), President of Venezuela.
- Clarence "Gatemouth" Brown, American blues musician. An avid pipe smoker, the Texas-blues guitarist often sold his own proprietary blend of pipe tobacco as well as autographed pipes at his concerts and shows.
- Abelardo Castillo, Argentine writer.
- Julio Cortázar, Argentine writer.
- Edward VIII, short-reigned (20 January – 11 December 1936) King of the United Kingdom.
- Albert Einstein, a German-born theoretical physicist and Nobel Prize laureate best known for developing the theory of relativity. His briar pipe is currently housed at the National Museum of American History.
- William Faulkner, American author, known to be an enthusiastic proponent of pipe smoking.
- Manuel Felguérez, Mexican artist.
- Gerald R. Ford (1913–2006), 38th President of the United States from 1974 to 1977.
- Graham Chapman (1941-1989), One of six members of Monty Python.
- Che Guevara (1928–1967), Argentinian revolutionary, who was known to enjoy a pipe from time to time, in addition to his usual cigar.
- Herbert Hoover (1874–1964), 31st President of the United States (1928–1933).
- J. Robert Oppenheimer (1904-1967), American theoretical physicist who served as the director of the Los Alamos Laboratory of the Manhattan Project during World War II. Although more known for his chain-smoking of cigarettes, he enjoyed pipe tobacco. His blend of choice was Walnut, a discontinued blend of the John Middleton Co., named after Walnut Street (Philadelphia).
- Douglas MacArthur (1880-1964), US five-star General during World War II and the Korean War. He was often photographed smoking Missouri Meerschaum corncob pipes (he allegedly sent his own pipe design to the company).
- John N. Mitchell (1913–1988), 67th Attorney General of the United States (1969–1972) under President Richard Nixon.
- Charles Stewart Mott, GM executive, philanthropist, Flint Mayor.
- Pablo Neruda, Chilean poet.
- Helmut Schmidt (1918–2015), Chancellor of West Germany (1974–1982).
- Joseph Stalin (1878–1953), Premier of the USSR. He was frequently shown with a pipe: "Photos of him appeared daily in the Soviet press, now in genial pipe-smoking profile, now walking with his comrades..."
- J. R. R. Tolkien (1892-1973), English writer and philologist. He was the author of the high fantasy works The Hobbit and The Lord of the Rings. He favored a billiards pipe and was an aficionado of Capstan Medium Navy Cut.
- Mark Twain (1835–1910), American author, a.k.a. Samuel Clemens, writer of Huckleberry Finn favored Missouri Meershaum corncob pipes. He was notoriously partial to a special blend of "Cuban leaf" pipe tobacco, remarking once that "If I cannot smoke in heaven, then I shall not go."
- Harold Wilson (1916–1995), UK Prime Minister (1964–1970, 1974–1976).

== Fictional characters who smoke pipes ==
- Bacicci, a sailor whose silhouette is featured on U.C. Sampdoria's club crest.
- Roger, Pongo's owner in 101 Dalmatians.
- Sherlock Holmes, British literary character. He is explicitly described as a pipe smoker.
- Kapitein Rob, Dutch comics character.
- Captain Haddock, Tintin's sailor companion in Hergé's The Adventures of Tintin.
- Popeye, fictional sailor. Frequently depicted with a pipe. Over time the use of his pipe as a smoking implement has reduced in favour of its use as a tool, a whistle (for his trademark toot), and as a straw through which he consumes spinach.

== Gallery ==
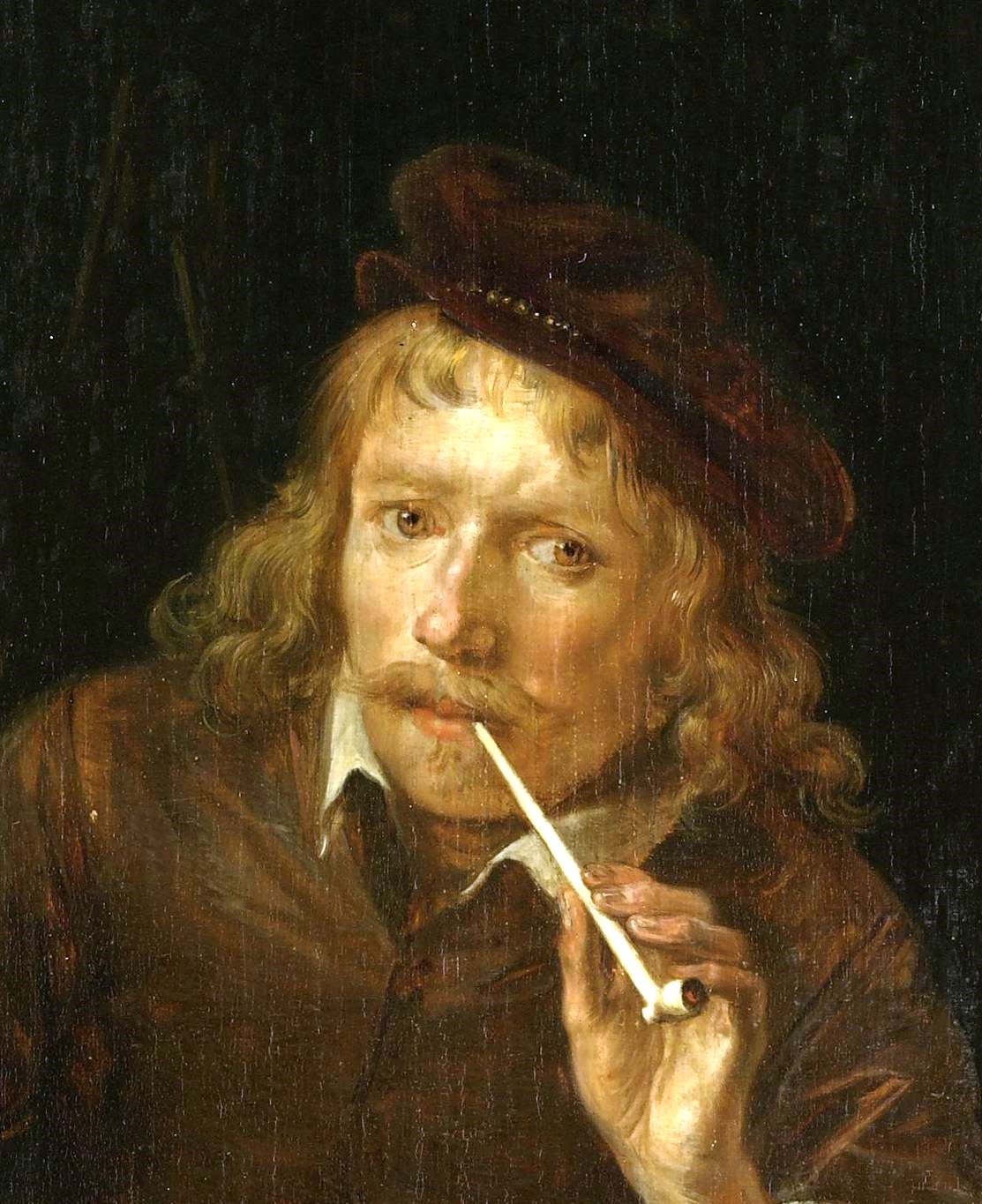
Gerrit Dou: self-portrait with long-stemmed clay pipe (1645)

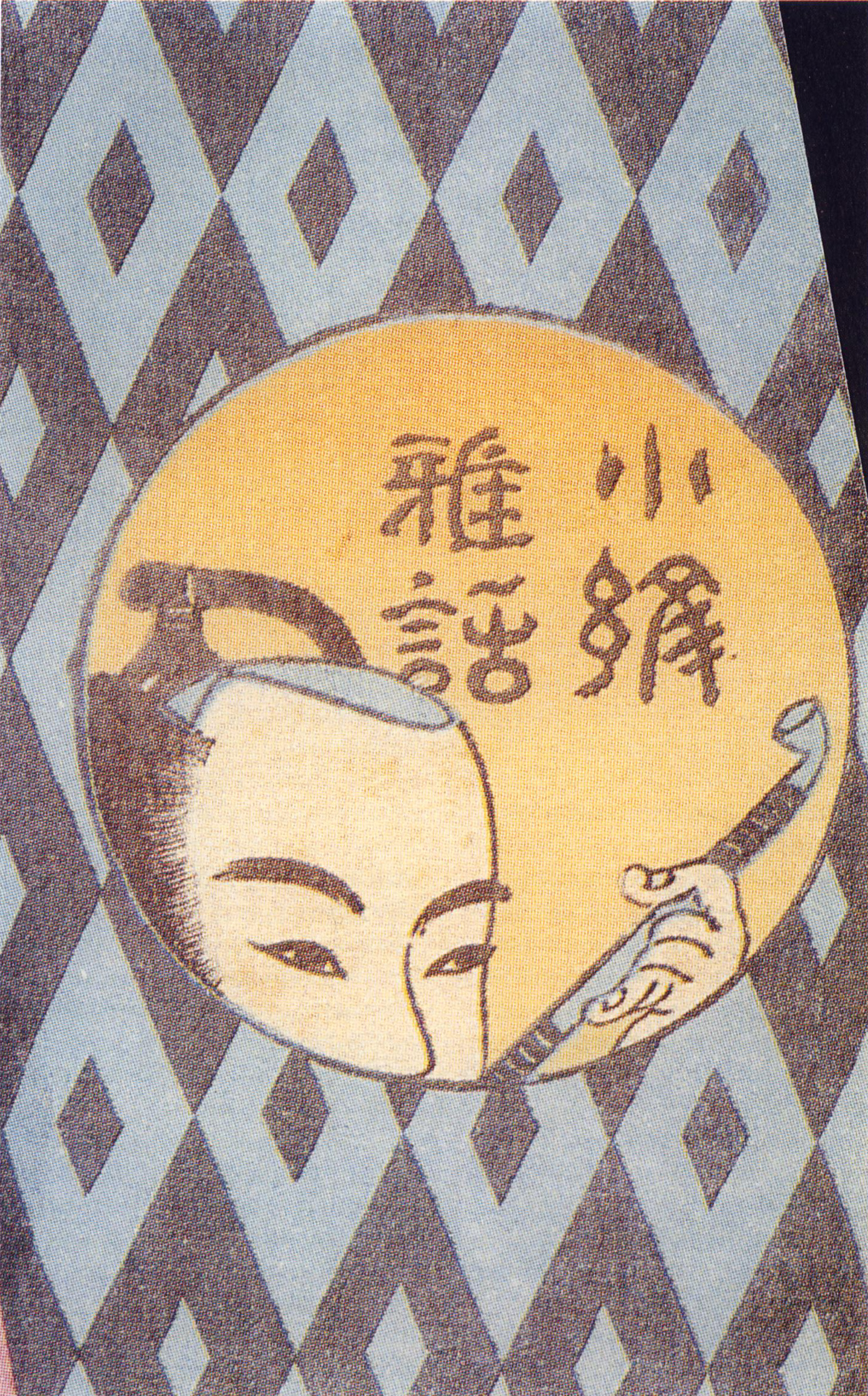
Man smoking kiseru. Cover illustration of the novel Komon gawa ("Elegant chats on fabric design") by Santō Kyōden, 1790

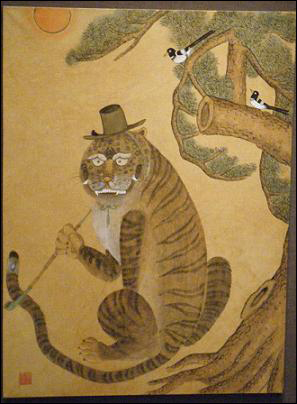
Tiger smoking a bamboo pipe, Korean folk painting from Joseon period

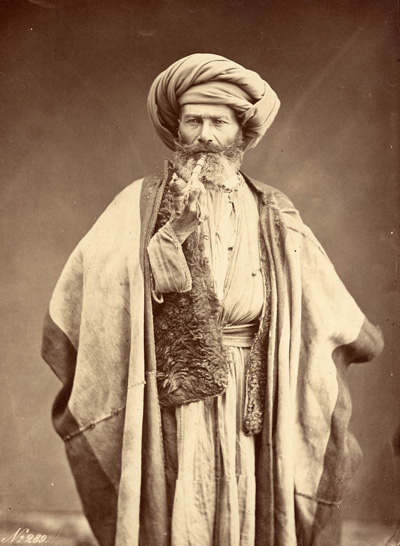
Arab man smoking pipe, late 1800s

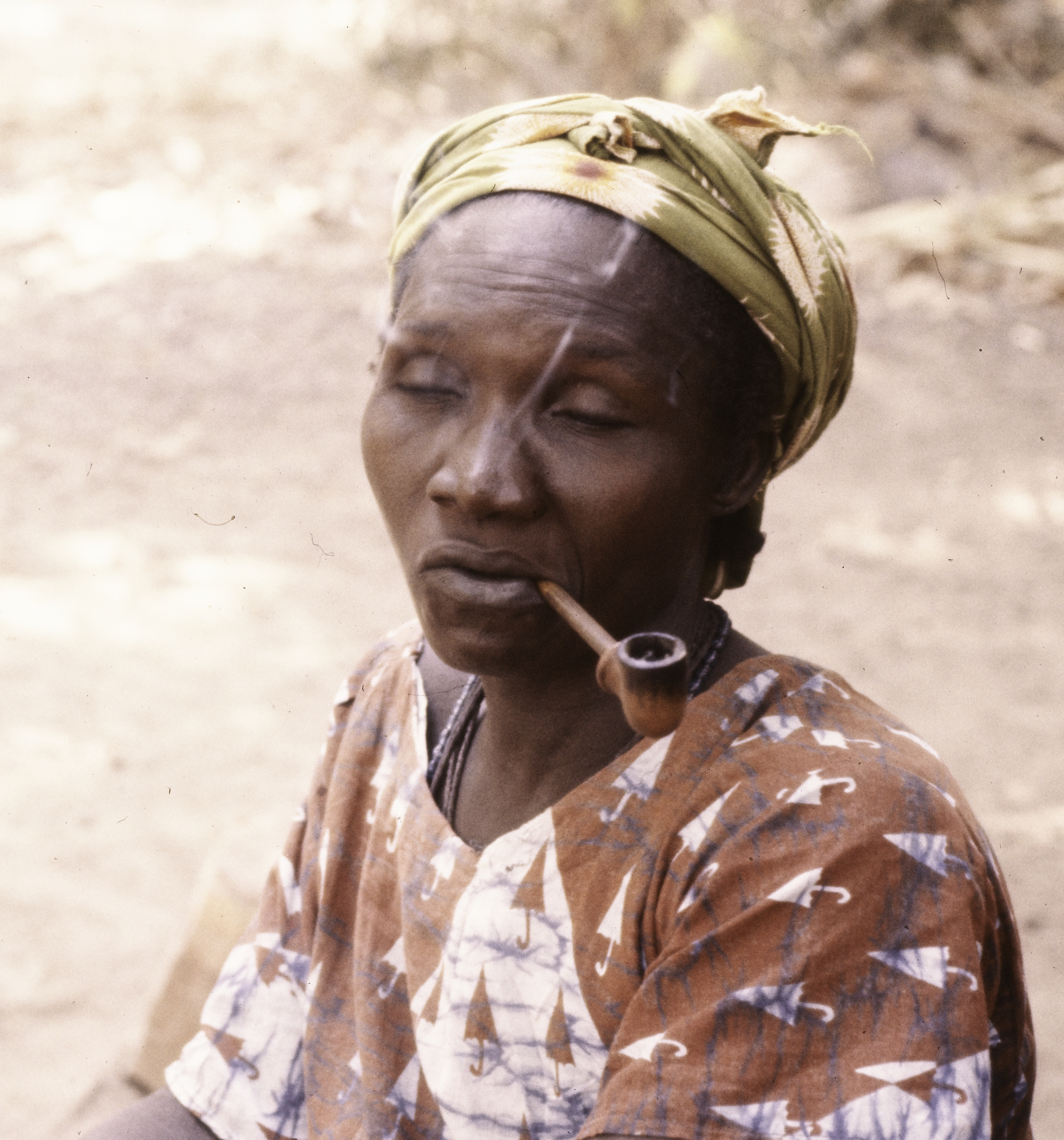
Woman smoking a pipe, Guinea-Bissau, 1974

== See also ==
=== For tobacco products ===
- Kiseru
- Midwakh
- Tobacco pipe

=== For cannabis ===
- Bong
- Cannabis pipe
- Chalice
- Chillum
- One hitter
- Sebsi

=== Other substances ===
- Opium pipe
