= Smoking pipe =

Device used for smoking

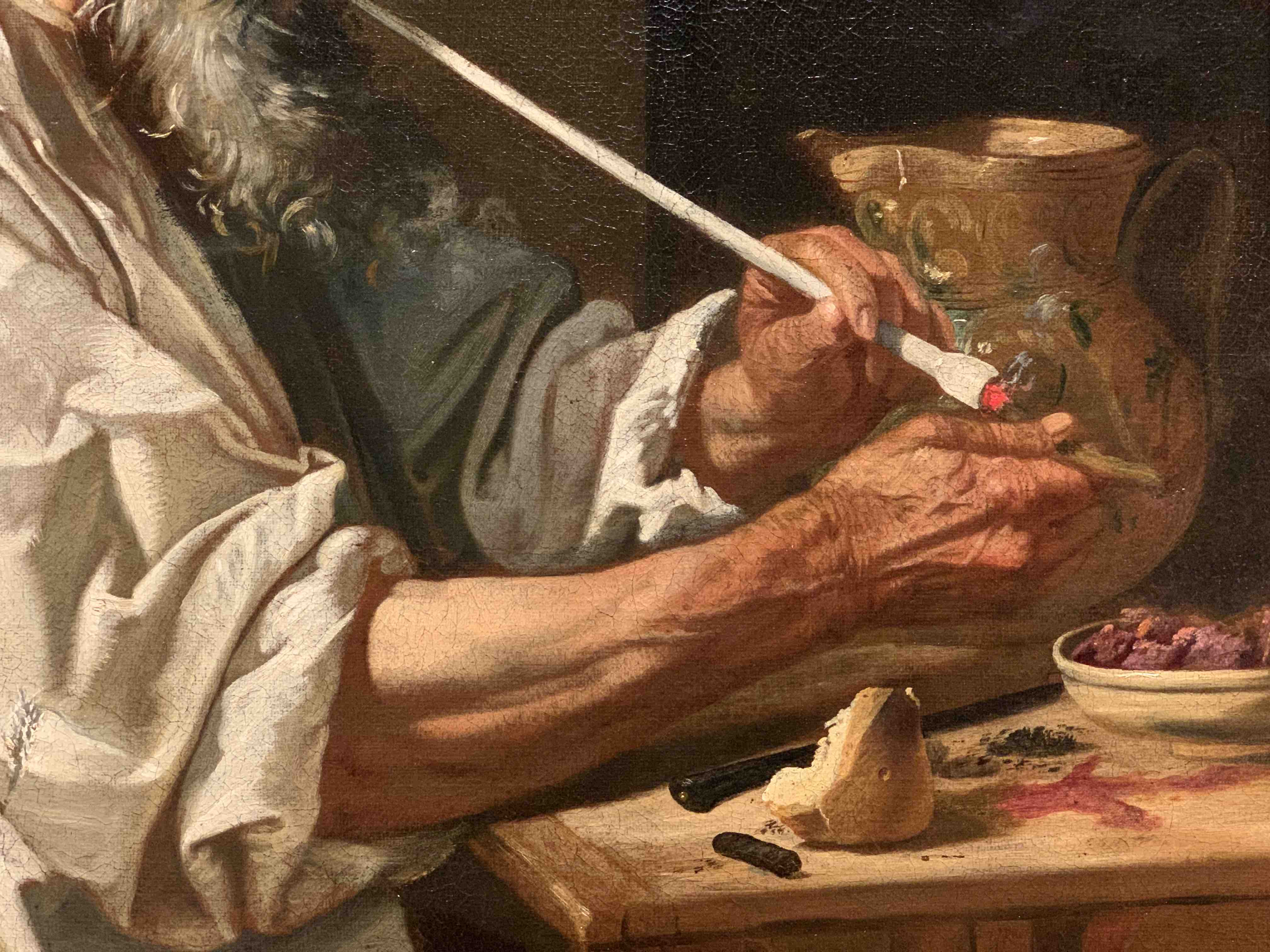
Detail of Old Peasant Lighting a Pipe by Johann Carl Loth (1655/1660)

A smoking pipe, often simply referred to as a pipe, is used to inhale or taste the smoke of a burning substance, typically a psychoactive substance. The term most commonly refers to a tobacco pipe, but it can also refer to a cannabis pipe (bowl). Pipes are commonly made from briar (heather), corncob, meerschaum, clay (including porcelain), cherry, glass, ebonite, or acrylic.

== Types ==
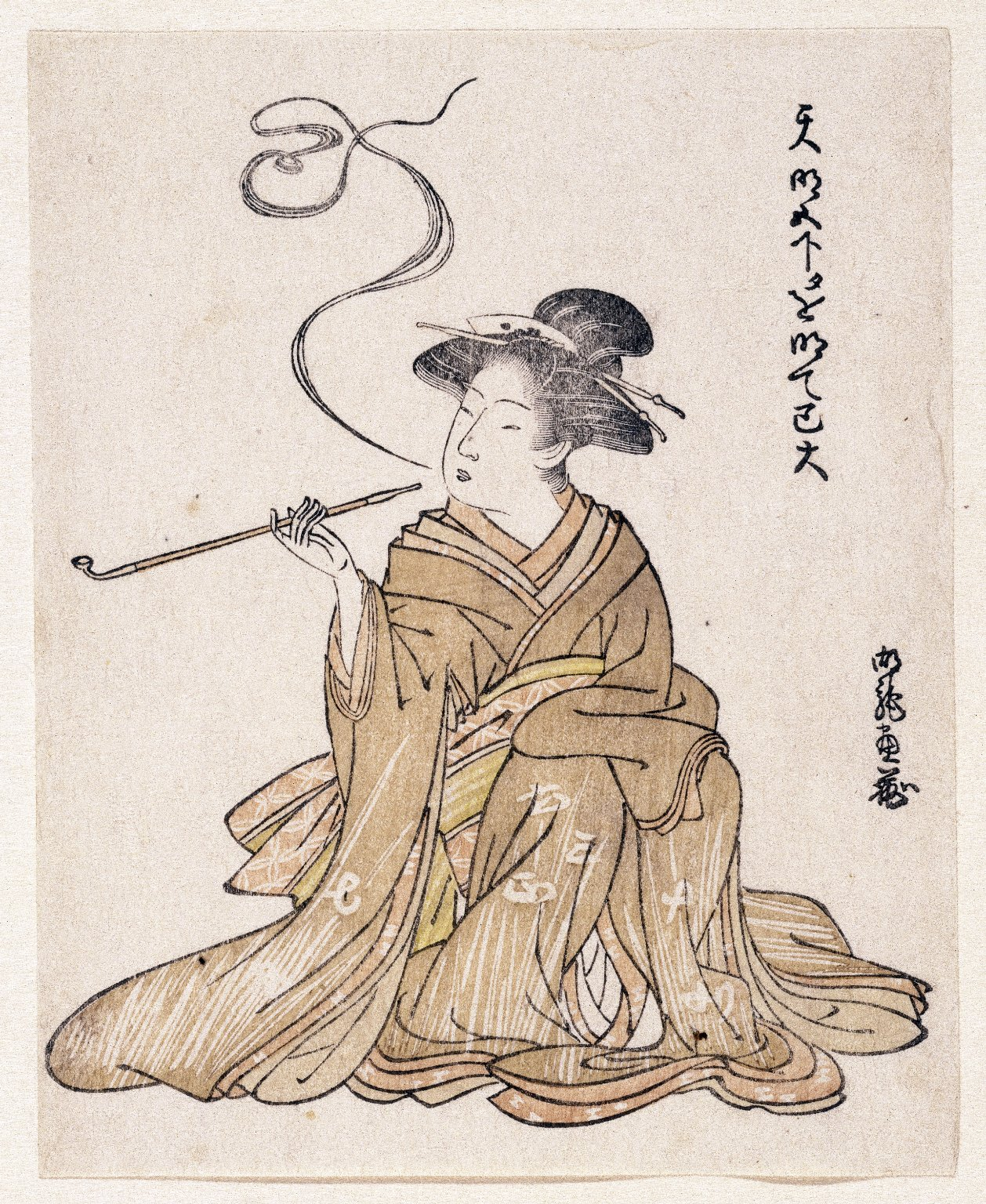
Japanese woodblock print c. 1785-1790 with a woman smoking a kiseru

- Bowl, pipes of various designs for smoking cannabis
  - Bong, also known as a water pipe
- Ceremonial pipe, used by some Native American peoples
- Chalice, a pipe used by Rastafari in cannabis rituals
- Chibouk, a long-stemmed Turkish tobacco pipe with a clay bowl, often ornamented with precious stones
- Chillum, conical smoking pipe originally from India
- Drug pipe, vessel used as drug paraphernalia to aid the smoking of hard drugs
  - Love rose, a pipe for smoking crack cocaine
  - Pizzo, a pipe designed for freebasing drugs
- Hookah, tall stemmed pipe in which the smoke is cooled and filtered by passing through water, also known as a water pipe
- Kiseru, Japanese pipe traditionally used for smoking finely shredded tobacco
- Midwakh, small smoking pipe of Arabian origin
- Sebsi, traditional Moroccan smoking pipe

== See also ==
- Pipe smoking, the practice of smoking a pipe
