= One-hitter (smoking) =

Type of smoking pipe

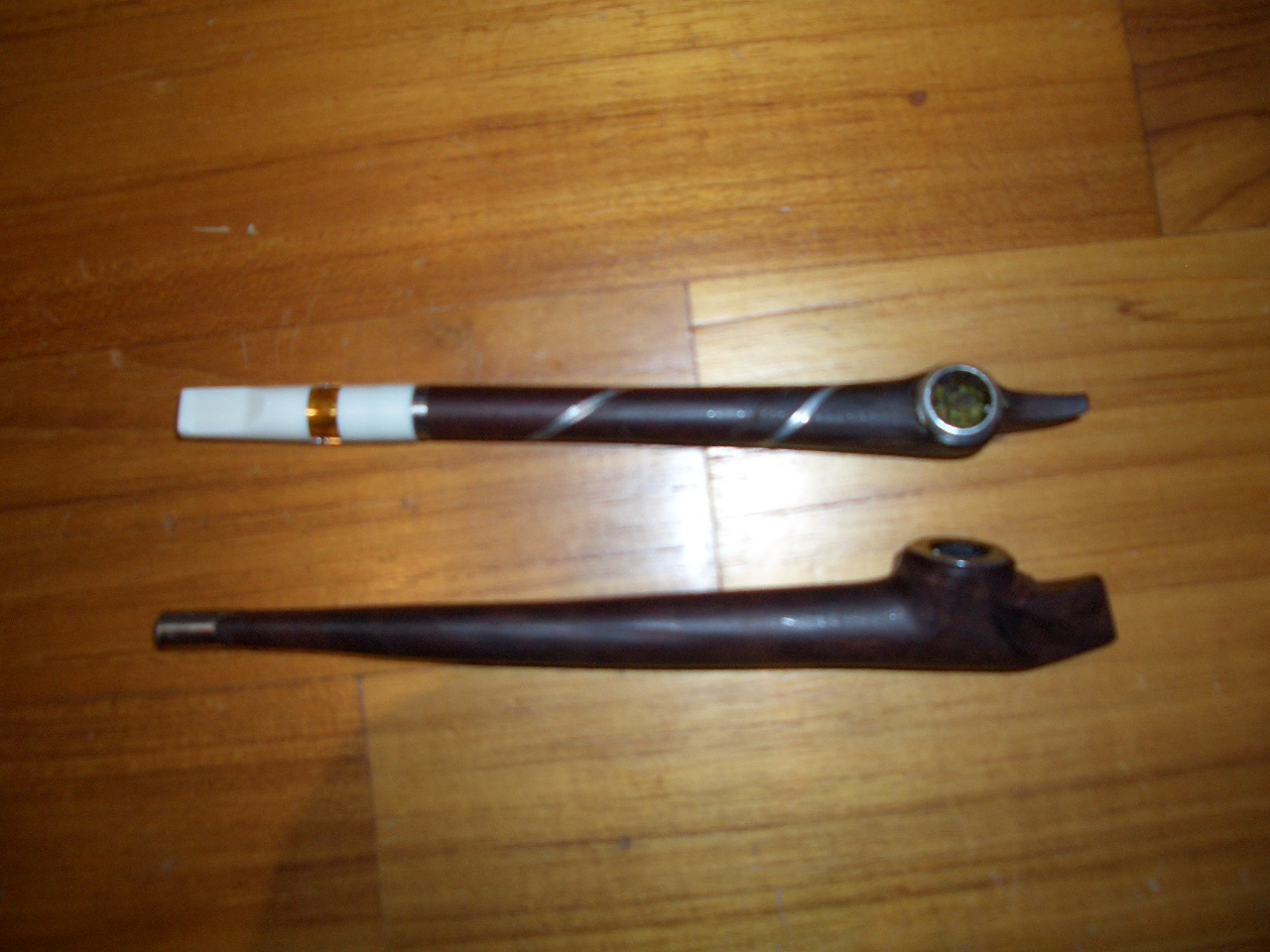
Midwakh (U.A.E.), shown with and without a stem-mounted filter. Traditionally used with dokha, a finely ground mixture of tobacco and spices

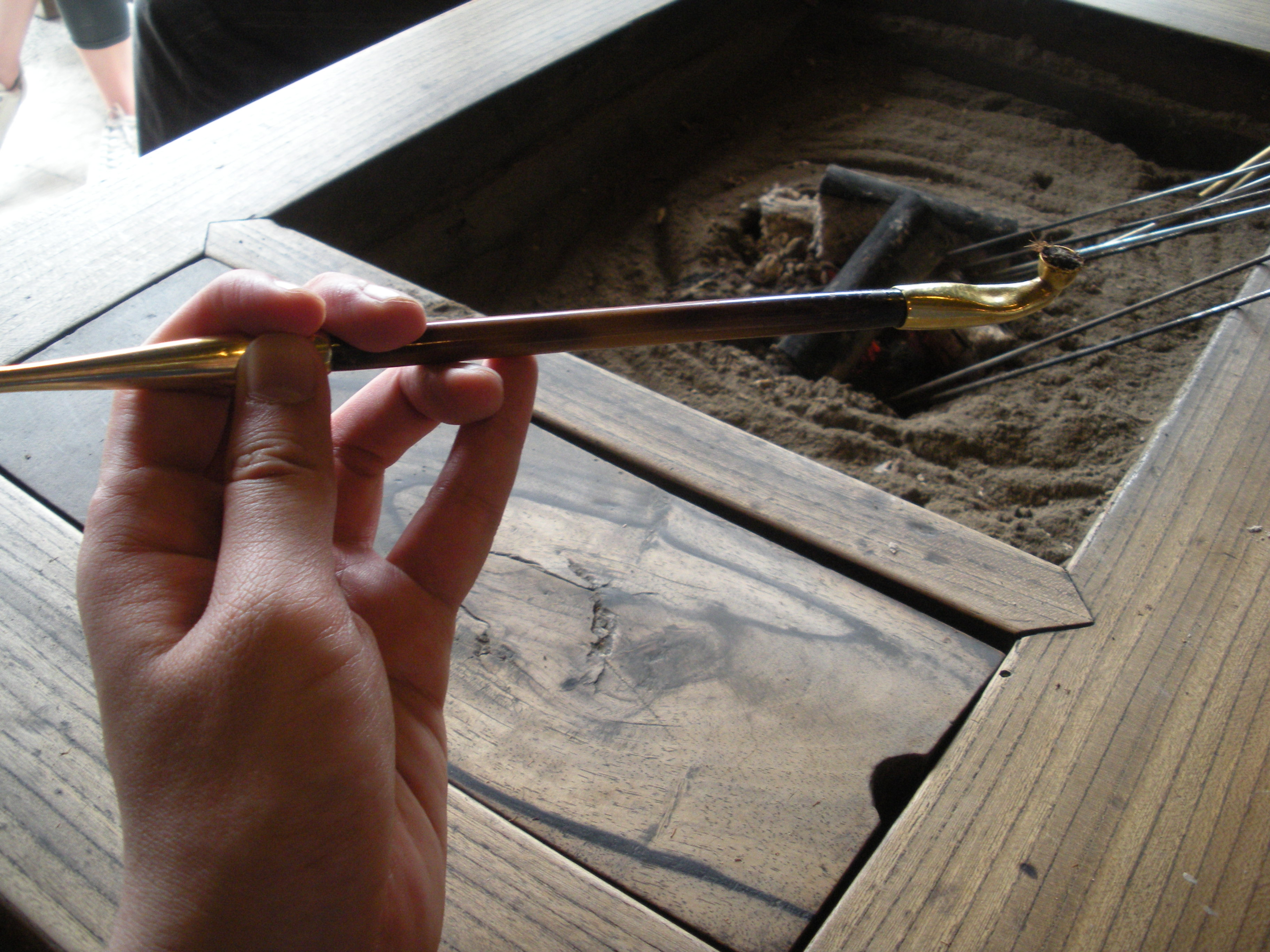
Kiseru, with handcrafted metal head and mouthpiece; traditionally used with kizami, a finely shredded Japanese tobacco product

A one-hitter (also oney, bat, tay, oney bat, or taster) is typically a slender pipe with a screened narrow bowl designed for a single inhalation, or "hit", of smoke or vapor from a small serving (about 0.1-0.3g) of cannabis flower, tobacco leaf or other dry, sifted herbal preparation (e.g Dokha). It is distinguished from western-style large-bowl pipes designed for strong tobaccos that are burned hot and tasted but not inhaled. Instead, by properly distancing a lighter flame below the opening, inhalant users operate at vaporization temperatures, minimizing combustion waste and toxicity.

Traditional national varieties of one-hitter pipes have included Native American calumet ("peace pipe"), kiseru (Japan), midwakh (Middle East), sebsi (Morocco) and some narrow chillums (Nepal, India, Jamaica).

A one-hitter has been considered drug paraphernalia in certain regions.

== Dugout ==
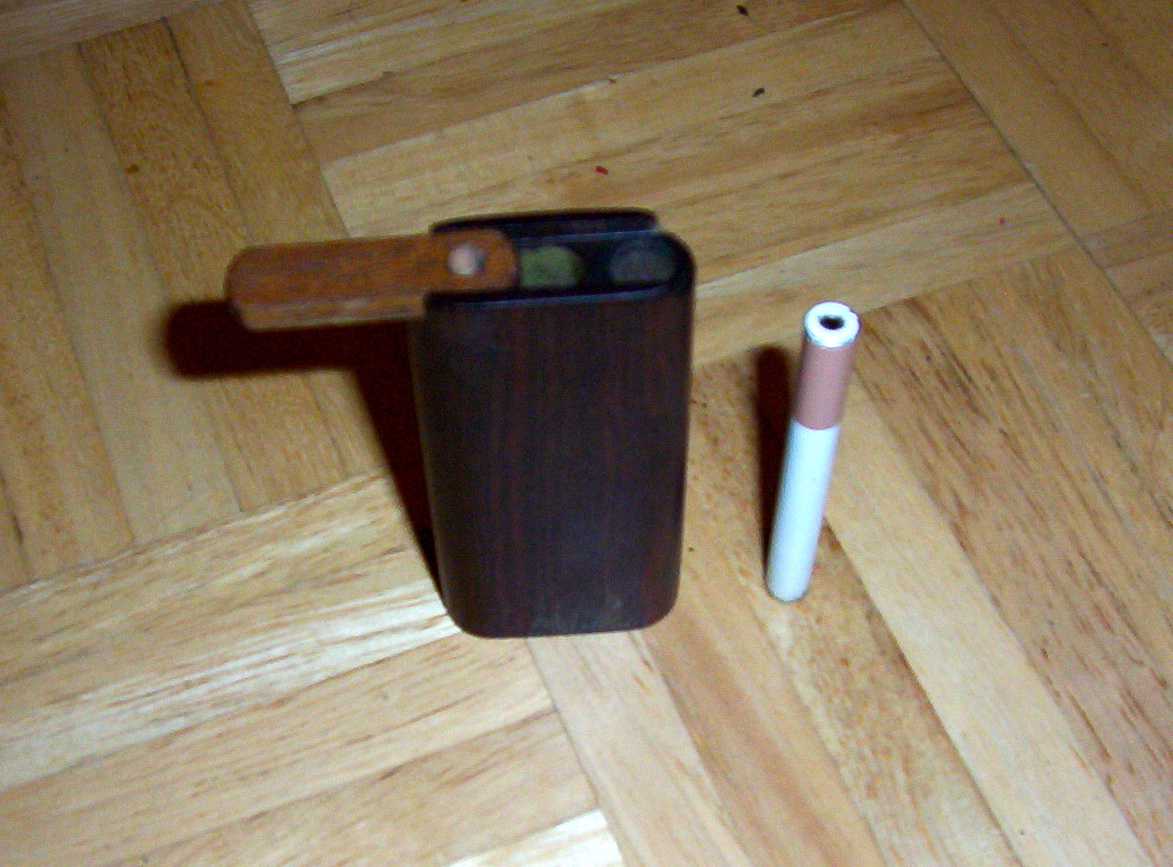
Wooden dugout box with cigarette-styled one-hitter, technically a small chillum (with end-to-end channel)

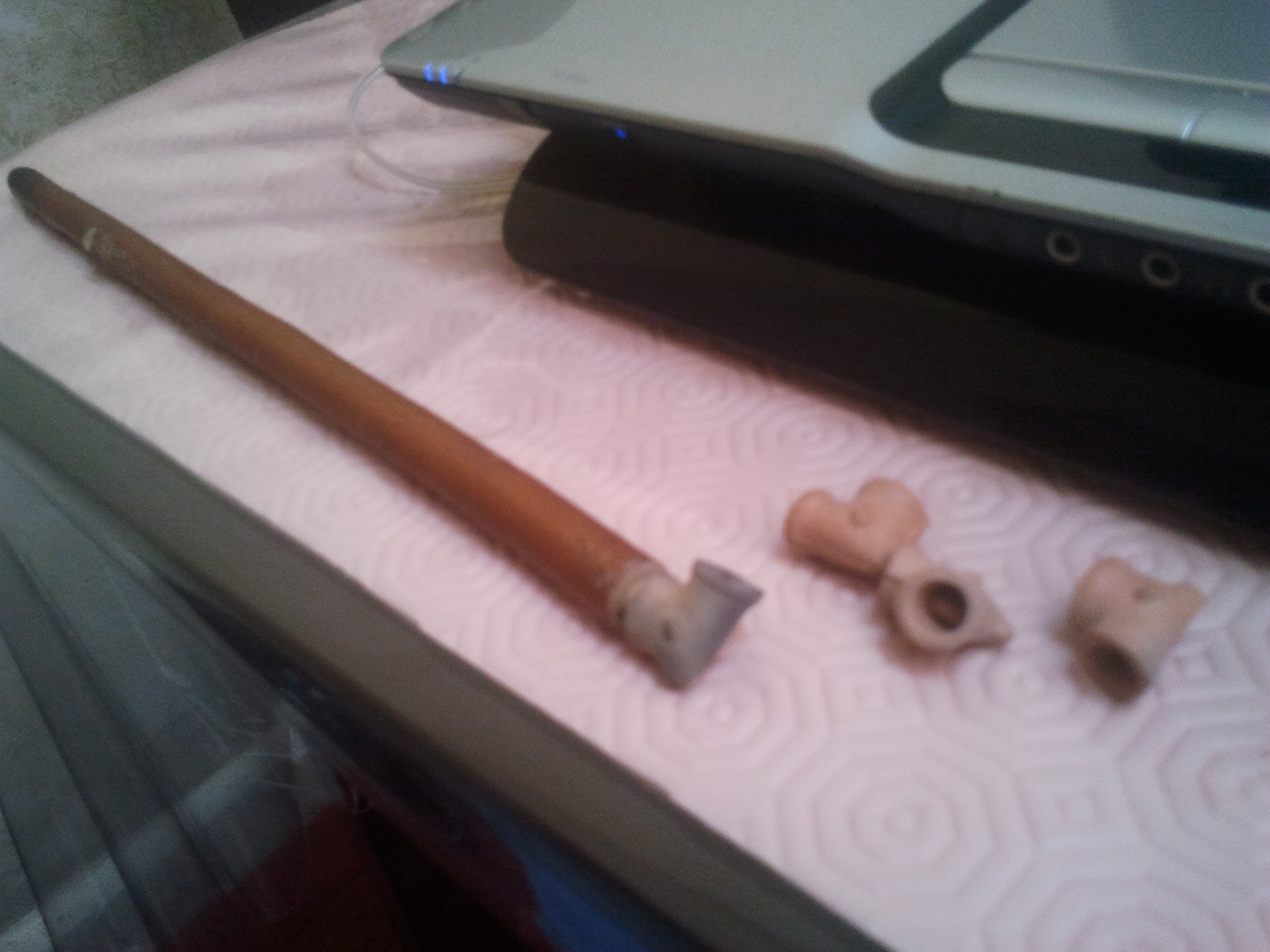
Sebsi (Morocco) with clay craterhead and long wooden tube

Brands of cigarette-sized one hitters for inconspicuous public use are marketed with a rectangular (or sometimes cylindrical) wooden case, known as a "dugout", with two compartments, the larger to store a stash of herb or tobacco and a narrower, cylindrical hole to store the "bat" or pipe.

Modern adaptations from craft-centric companies use fine and rare woods, bone, acrylic, aluminum, steel, titanium, other metals or plastics, adding features such as grinders, poker storage or lighter chambers. Carried in a shirt pocket, they are the tangible "replacement" for a pack of cigarettes when one is eliminating a smoking habit.

== See also ==
- Cannabis smoking
- Chillum (pipe)
- Hashish
- Kiseru
- Midwakh
- Sebsi
- Smoking cessation
- Vaporizer (inhalation device)
