= Pizzo =

Pizzo is an Italian word with multiple meanings. It often means peak and hence is found in the name of numerous Italian mountains. It may also refer to

- Pizzo, Calabria, a seaport in Calabria, Italy
- Pizzo (mafia), imposed by a protection racket, a fee periodically collected by the Mafia from businesses
- Pizzo (pipe), a pipe designed for smoking methamphetamine
- Pizzo (surname)
