= Pizzolo =

Pizzolo (pronounced [pitˈtsɔːlo]) is an Italian surname. Notable people with the surname include:

- Gabriella Pizzolo (born 2003), American actress and singer
- Matt Pizzolo (born before 1987), American filmmaker, comic book writer, playwright and entrepreneur
- Nicolò Pizzolo (c. 1420 – after 1453), Italian painter

== See also ==
- Pizzolo, a type of Sicilian pizza from Syracuse
- Pizzo (surname)
- Pizzoli (surname)
- Pozzolo
