= Pizzoli (surname) =

Pizzoli (pronounced [pitˈtsɔːli]) is an Italian surname. Notable people with the surname include:

- Caio Pizzoli, Brazilian ten-pin bowler
- Davide Pizzoli (born 1999), Italian motorcycle racer
- Emiliano Pizzoli (born 1974), Italian hurdler
- Gioacchino Pizzoli (1651–1733), Italian painter
- Maria Luigia Pizzoli (1817–1838), Italian pianist and composer

== See also ==
- Pizzoli
- Pizzolo
