= Dokha =

Dried and flavoured tobacco

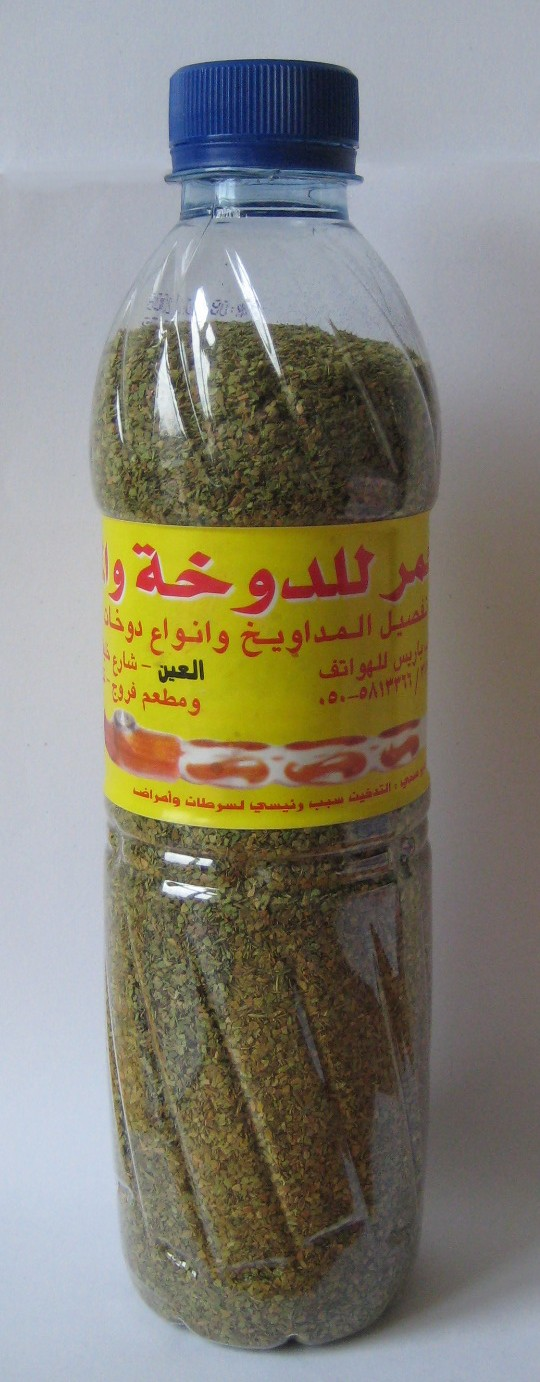
A bottle of ready to use dokha flakes from a local vendor in the United Arab Emirates

Dokha (Arabic: دوخة, "dizziness" or "vertigo") is a tobacco product, consisting of dried and ground tobacco leaves that have been flavored with herbs and spices. It originated in Iran around the 16th century. Unlike hookah tobacco preparations (usually called "shisha" or "mu'assel"), dokha is dry and does not contain molasses or water. Users smoke the tobacco blend in small quantities using a pipe called a midwakh. Because the midwakh pipe is used almost exclusively for smoking dokha, the terms are often used interchangeably.

Dokha has a higher concentration of nicotine compared to other forms of tobacco, and can thus cause brief periods of euphoria, relaxation or lightheadedness in some users. As using the midwakh also reportedly leaves fewer lingering smells, and requires less tobacco to be used at a time, it can be used discreetly, which has made it popular among student populations and young adults.

The product is popular in the United Arab Emirates (UAE), Oman, Qatar, Saudi Arabia, Yemen, Bahrain, Jordan, and other Middle Eastern countries. It has reportedly spread to Europe, India and other regions via immigration, tourism and trade. Scientific research on the health effects of dokha use is lacking, but officials have concerns over the use of the product as a cigarette alternative, and preliminary studies have quantified dokha's high levels of carcinogenic tar. Notable concern in the UAE over the spreading popularity of dokha among teenagers and young adults has led to multiple tobacco control efforts to curb its use.

== History ==
Tobacco has been cultivated and used in Middle Eastern countries for approximately 500 years. It originated in Iran during the 15th century, as use spread among sailors in the Caspian Sea, which led to its eventual spread throughout all of the Middle East during the following centuries. Traditionally, dokha consists of dried and ground tobacco leaves and spices that are sometimes also mixed with dried flowers and fruits. Depending on local traditions, different species of native plants were also used.

=== Preparation ===
Modern dokha maintains many of the characteristics of its traditional forms, consisting of tobacco and spices.

Unlike most tobaccos, dokha is not fire cured and cut, but dried in the arid desert region where it is harvested. It is finely ground to preserve the strength, freshness and flavor of the tobacco. The tobacco is then blended with other spices and herbs to create the final product. In many countries where dokha is used, there are a number of available tobacco strengths (typically described in Arabic as "hot", "warm" or "cold"), which indicate the harshness of a particular blend.

Dokha is traditionally smoked out of an ornate, handcrafted medwakh pipe - often custom-made from materials like bone, wood, metal, or even adorned with gemstones - reflecting its cultural and aesthetic value beyond its function.

== Usage ==
=== Smoking ===
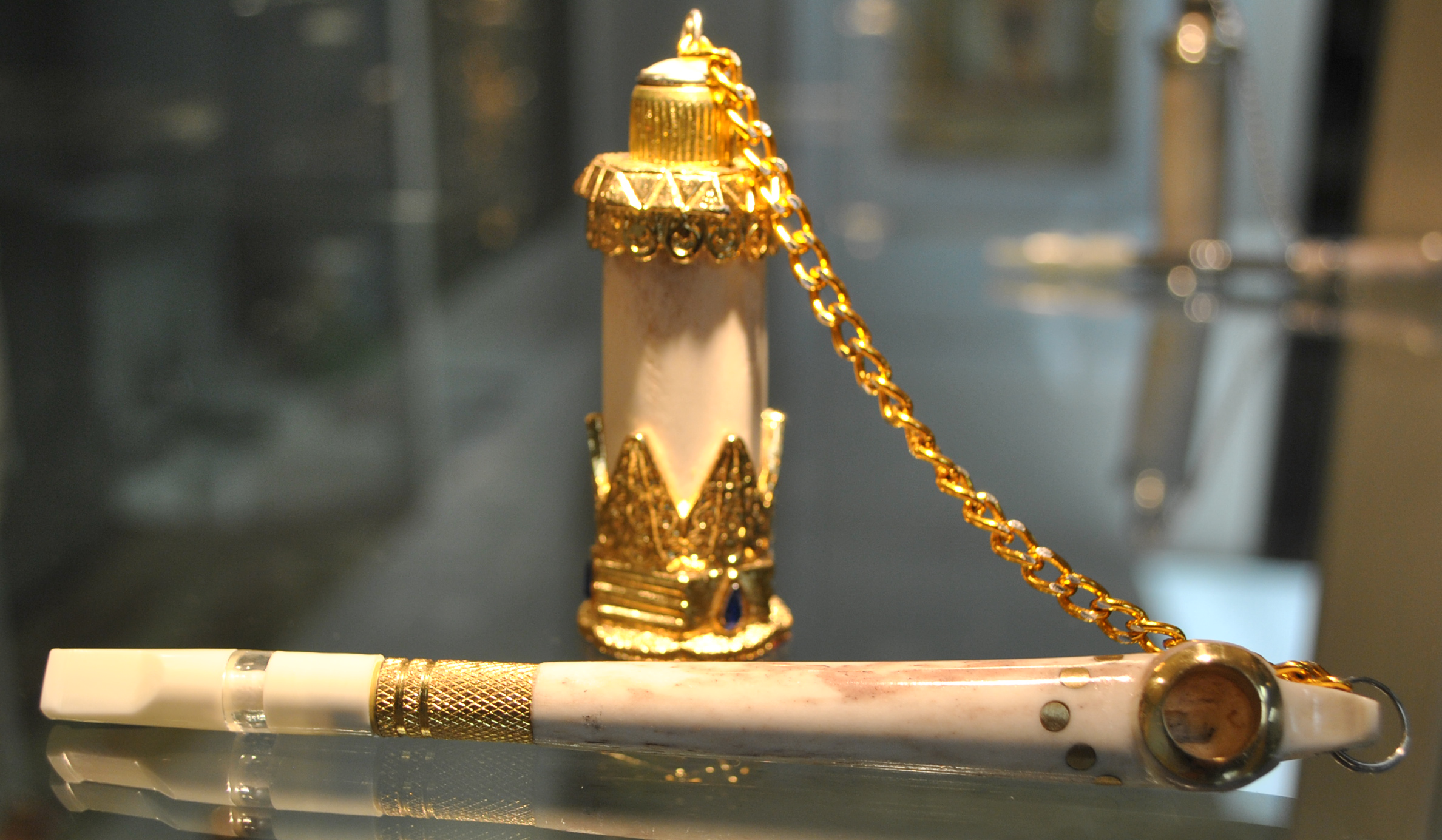
A stone and gold-encrusted medwakh pipe, and a chanta, used for storing the dokha tobacco

Dokha is almost exclusively smoked out of an elongated pipe called a midwakh (alternatively spelled 'medwakh'). The traditional midwakh has no filter, but more recent variations contain a removable, stem-mounted filter. A small container called a chanta is sometimes used to store and dispense the tobacco. Approximately 0.5-1 grams of dokha tobacco is smoked at a time, and is usually consumed in about two inhalations. One study estimates that a typical daily user of dokha consumes approximately 6 grams of product in around 12 smoking sessions.

A preliminary study that found dokha has significantly more nicotine than other tobacco products such as cigarettes. Nicotine is a highly addictive recreational drug which generally produces feelings of euphoria, increased alertness and a sense of relaxation and dokha is well known to quickly satisfy intense nicotine cravings.

Users sometimes describe the sensation as 'dizziness', which is where dokha's name (meaning 'dizziness' or 'vertigo' in Arabic) is presumed to be derived. Dokha does not traditionally contain cannabis, but in some cultures where dokha is uncommon, it has been reportedly mistaken for ground cannabis.

=== Prevalence ===
While dokha is not a new tobacco product, use has increased intensely in the Middle East, particularly in the UAE, and especially among males aged 20–39, during the 2000s and 2010s. Experts speculate this may be due to tobacco control efforts' exclusive focus on cigarette use, coupled with the fact that dokha and midwakh usage in these countries has become the second-most popular form of tobacco, after cigarettes.

Culminating in legislative efforts in 2009 and 2018, there has also been particular concern in the UAE that teenagers may be getting easier access to dokha tobacco when they are unable to obtain cigarettes, and that dokha has quickly become popular among young adults. Dokha's reported lack of lingering smells (compared to other forms of smoked tobacco) and the relatively smaller amount of material smoked in a given session, make it a convenient form of discreetly and quickly satisfying nicotine cravings, which has made dokha popular among underage smokers. One study assessing the prevalence of dokha smoking among secondary school students in the UAE found that 39% had ever smoked tobacco products, 36% had ever smoked dokha specifically, and 25% of them were now current users of dokha, which is very high compared to other forms of smoking.

Secondary analysis of the nationally representative 2013 United Arab Emirates Global Youth Tobacco Survey among students aged 13–15 years found that 18.5% had ever tried midwakh and 9.0% were current users. Among current users, 15.9% smoked midwakh daily, and daily users reported a median of eight midwakhs per day compared with 3.8 per month among non-daily users, indicating that most adolescent midwakh consumption in this survey was concentrated among daily smokers.

Dokha use has seen some emergence in the Western world, and some health officials speculate this may be due to immigration, globalized commerce, and internet sales, but such a trend has not been definitively studied or proven. Retail companies specifically catering to dokha smokers can now be found in the United Kingdom, and more tobacco shops are stocking dokha and midwakh accessories to fill a gap in the market, which some company representatives claim is driven by increased immigration from Middle Eastern countries. There have been reports that Dokha may be spreading in popularity in some regions of India, due to one successful startup company.

== Sale and regulation ==
Dokha is regulated by most countries in the same manner as they would other tobacco products.

=== United Arab Emirates ===
The UAE passed "Federal Law No. 15 regarding Tobacco Control" in December 2009, making the legal age to purchase tobacco (including dokha) 18 years old. The law also made smoking in cars (with children under 12 present), houses of worship, educational campuses and health/fitness centers, illegal. This law was expanded in 2012 by adopting GSO standards that require tobacco packaging warning messages.

In October 2015, the Dubai Municipality issued warnings to 40 dokha shops to obtain certificates of conformity from the UAE Authority for Standardization and Metrology. The shops were required to discontinue the practices of allowing customers to sample dokha in the shop and cleaning their midwakh pipes for them in order to obtain these certificates. Despite these efforts, there were still concerns from local leaders and health officials over shopkeepers illegally selling dokha and midwakh pipes to underage customers, and teenage use of tobacco continued to rise.

An excise tax was introduced on October 1, 2017, on tobacco products in an effort to discourage their consumption. There was confusion among dokha users and retailers as to whether all dokha products, or only specific dokha brands, were subject to the excise tax. A poll the following year showed that one in four smokers said that the new tax changed their habit.

In May 2018, new regulations were approved by the UAE's National Tobacco Control Programme by the Ministry of Health and Prevention. Intended to be in place by the end of the year, the regulations set purchase restrictions specifically on dokha products. They also ban the practice of bottling and refilling larger quantities at home or in shops, which has been the local custom, and require dokha product packaging to include pictorial warnings (the same way other types of tobacco products were required to have per the 2012 law).

A 2023 narrative review of alternative tobacco products in Gulf Cooperation Council countries described midwakh as a locally popular product for which evidence on chemical composition and health effects remains limited compared with conventional cigarettes. The review highlighted ongoing research gaps on midwakh and noted that more comprehensive regulation of alternative tobacco products, including midwakh, is needed across Gulf states.

== Health effects ==
Dokha is possibly just as or more dangerous than cigarettes, and more research is needed to fully investigate the adverse effects, as there is little comparative study between dokha and other tobacco products.

=== Acute effects ===
As of 2019, few studies have been performed on the acute effects specific to dokha use, but one uncontrolled study among male UAE medical university students assessed the following:

- Increased systolic blood pressure
- Decreased diastolic blood pressure
- Increased heart rate and respiration

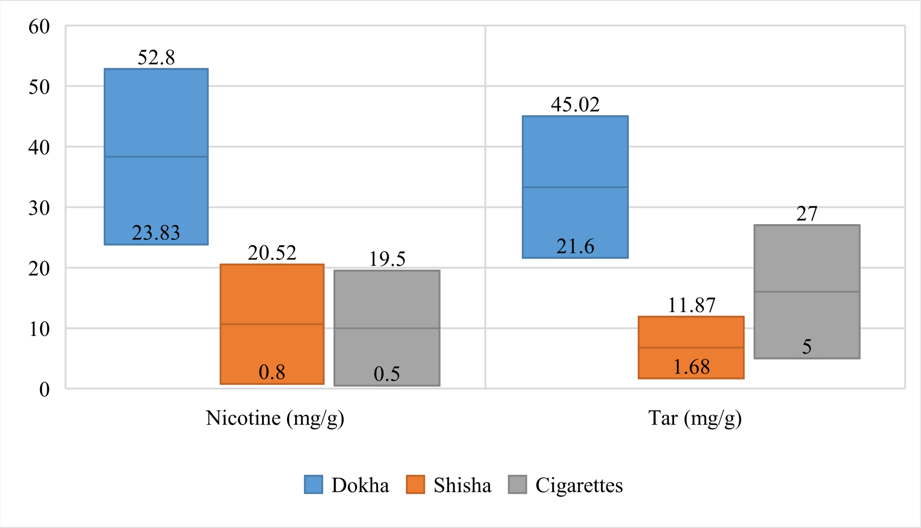
Nicotine and tar levels compared to other tobacco products, per a 2018 University of Sharjah study

=== Chronic effects ===
As dokha consists of tobacco and other plant material, health officials suspect the effects from prolonged use are similar or identical to that of cigarettes and other tobacco products, but as of 2020 there have been no clinical studies to identify the long-term risks specific to it. Anecdotal evidence from chronic users suggests that long-term use may cause them to feel out of breath after strenuous activity, and they report difficulty quitting.

One study speculated that oral lesions are a possible chronic side effect of irritation from the midwakh pipe.

An exploratory clinical proteomics study published in 2024 compared saliva from 33 young adult medwakh smokers with that from 30 non-smokers and reported widespread alterations in salivary protein profiles, including pathways related to oxidative stress, energy metabolism and cell adhesion. The authors also found higher salivary levels of several inflammatory cytokines among medwakh users, which they interpreted as evidence of increased local inflammatory activity associated with medwakh smoking.

Some of the health risks of tobacco smoking in general, that have been identified, are:

- Chronic chest infections
- Obstructive pulmonary disease
- Increased risk of larynx, respiratory or other organ cancers
- Nicotine dependence and tolerance, increased risks of nicotine poisoning

=== Chemical composition ===
A February 2018 study called for further research into the harmful effects of dokha smoke after it found that three different types of dokha tested from the Middle East and North Africa region contained toxic metals comprising "22 irritants, 3 known carcinogens, 5 central nervous system depressants, in addition to several other compounds with miscellaneous effects".

In September 2018, a University of Sharjah study compared the nicotine and tar levels in dokha to other tobacco products, which found dokha had significantly higher levels of both. Nicotine in dokha was measured at 23.83–52.8 mg/g compared to 0.8–20.52 mg/g in shisha, and 0.5–19.5 mg/g in cigarettes. Tar in dokha was measured at 21.6–45.02 mg/g compared to 1.68–11.87 mg/g in shisha and 5–27 mg/g in cigarettes.

In May 2019, a second study at the University of Sharjah attempted to quantify trace metals in dokha and shisha products, using EDXRF. Traces of aluminum, calcium, chromium, copper, iron, magnesium, manganese, nickel, potassium, strontium and zinc were detected in both product types. Across the 13 dokha products tested, the highest mean concentrations were of calcium, potassium and magnesium (8235.77 ± 144.51, 4467.50 ± 168.06, and 2096.20 ± 130.69 μg/g, respectively).

A DNA barcoding and microbiological analysis of 15 commercial dokha products purchased in the United Arab Emirates and the United States found that all plant DNA sequences belonged to the Nicotiana genus and no other plant species. Whole-genome sequencing of the same samples showed bacterial colonisation, including species of Clostridium, Streptomyces, Campylobacter and Streptococcus, with microbial communities reported to be similar to those found in other commercial tobacco products.
