= Pizzo (surname) =

Pizzo is an Italian surname that may refer to

- Alberto Pizzo (born 1980), Italian pianist and composer
- Eraldo Pizzo (born 1938), Italian water polo player
- G. Pizzo, Italian rower who won a bronze medal at the 1906 Olympics
- Jason Pizzo (born 1976), American attorney and politician
- Manuela Pizzo (born 1991), Argentinian handball player
- Mickaël Pizzo (born 1979), French football player
- Paolo Pizzo (born 1983), Italian épée fencer
- Philip A. Pizzo (born 1944), American professor, physician, and scientist
- Phillip Pizzo (born 1950), known as The Mall Rapist, American serial rapist
- Rose Pizzo (born 1932), Italian American author
- Salvatore Pizzo, American scientist
