= Chillum =

Conical pipe used to smoke marijuana

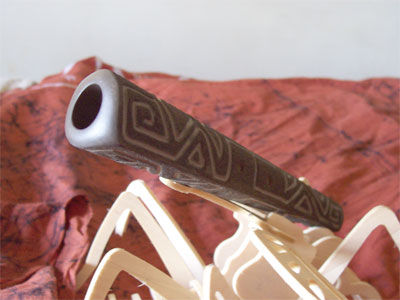
An Italian-made chillum

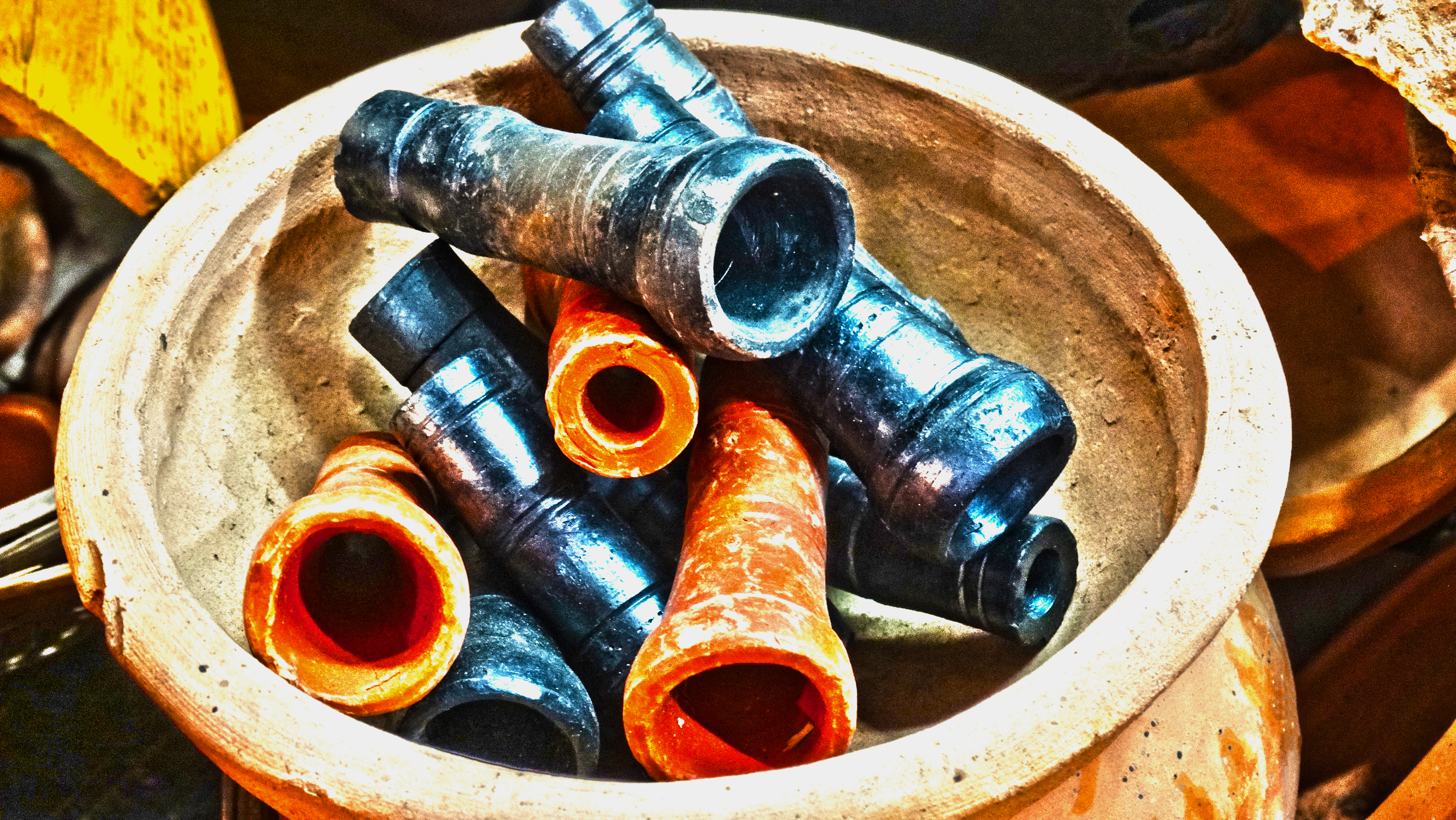
Traditional earthen chillum displayed for sale at Chawk Bazaar Jorhat, Assam

A chillum, or chilam, or sulpa is a straight conical smoking pipe traditionally made of either clay or a soft stone (such as steatite or catlinite). It is used popularly in Nepal and India to smoke marijuana. A small stone is often used as a stopper in the stem. The style of pipe spread to Africa, and has been known in the Americas since the 1960s. A chillum pipe is used in Rastafari rituals.

== History ==
According to Alfred Dunhill, Africans have long employed chillum-style pipes for smoking cannabis and later tobacco. Gourds and various horns were often employed while conical bowls were common in Uganda. One of the more famous pipes is an ivory cone pipe once belonging to Buganda monarch King Mtesa.

More recently, it has also seen use in sacraments by Rastafari.

== Rastafari ceremony ==
In Rastafarian meetings called "reasoning sessions" and during Grounation Day celebrations, a chillum is used. It is made of a cow's horn or conical wood piece, fitted with a long drawtube giving the smoke time to cool before inhalation. A bong-like chillum equipped with a water filtration chamber is sometimes referred to as a chalice. Rastafaris offer thanks and praises to God (referred to as Jah in Rastafari) before smoking the chillum.

== See also ==
- Spiritual use of cannabis
- Smoking pipe (non-tobacco)
- Hookah
- Bong
- One-hitter (smoking)
