= Bowl (smoking) =

Part of smoking pipe

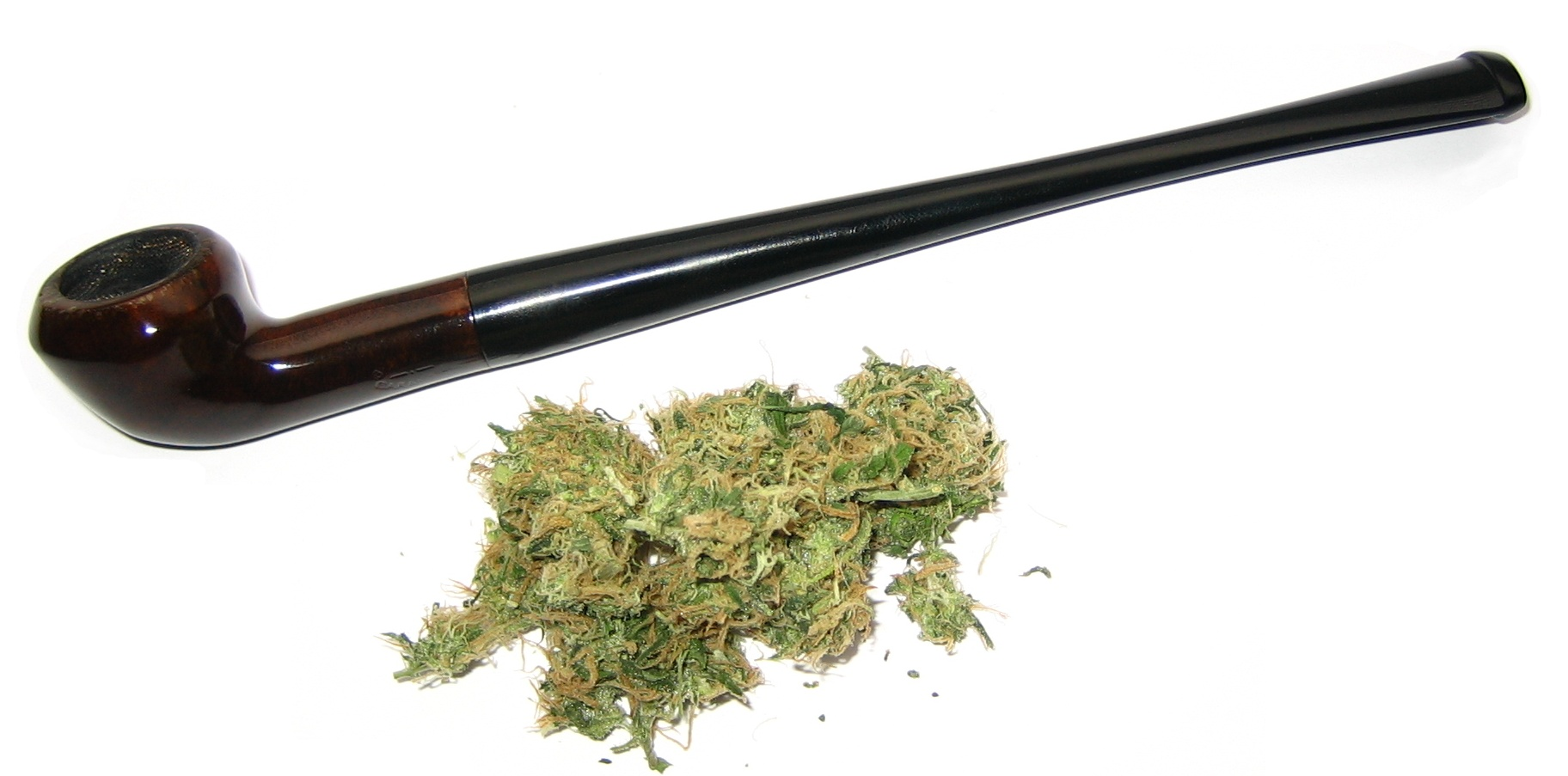
Ground cannabis with pipe

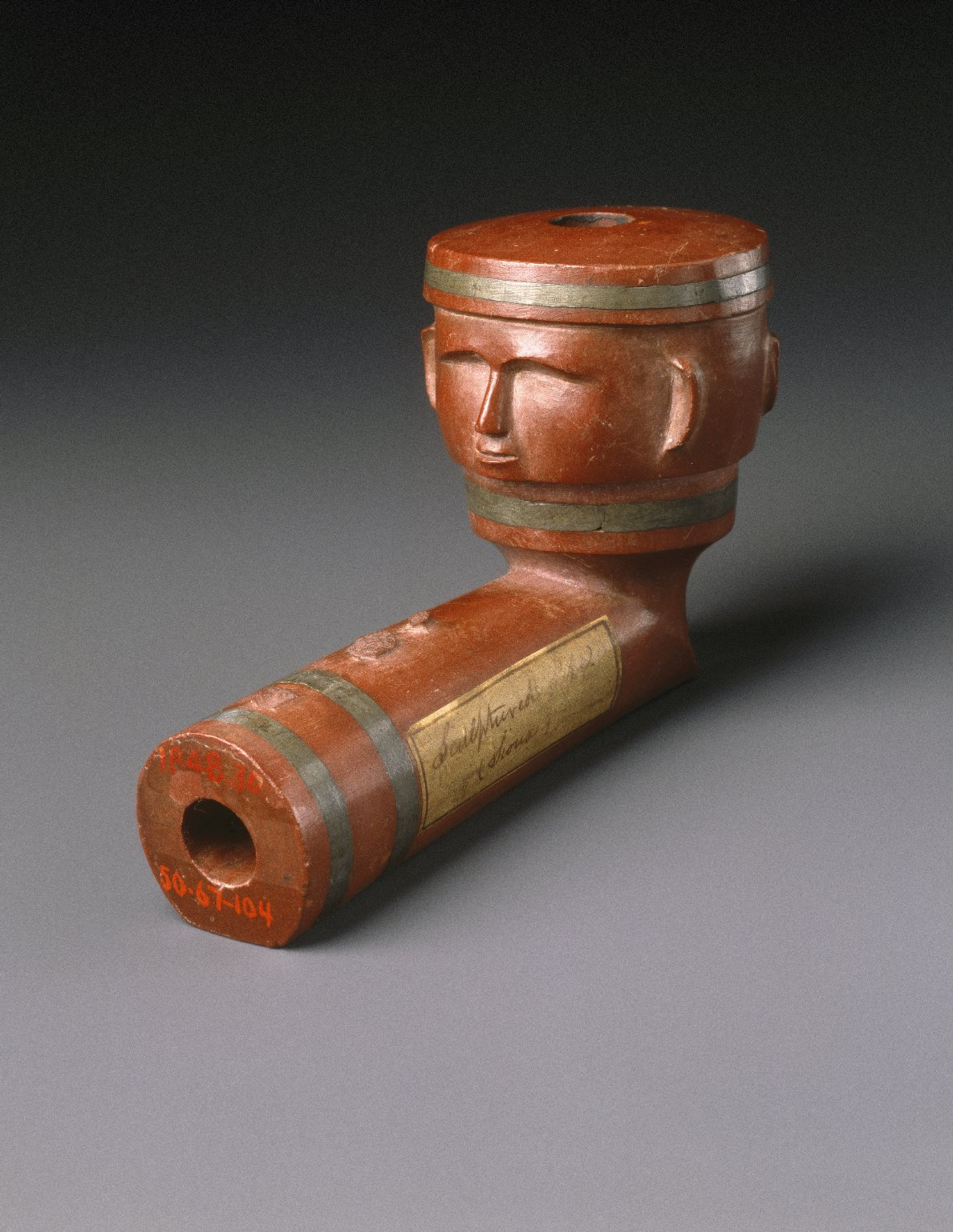
Native American (Sioux) inlayed pipe bowl with two faces, early 19th century, Brooklyn Museum

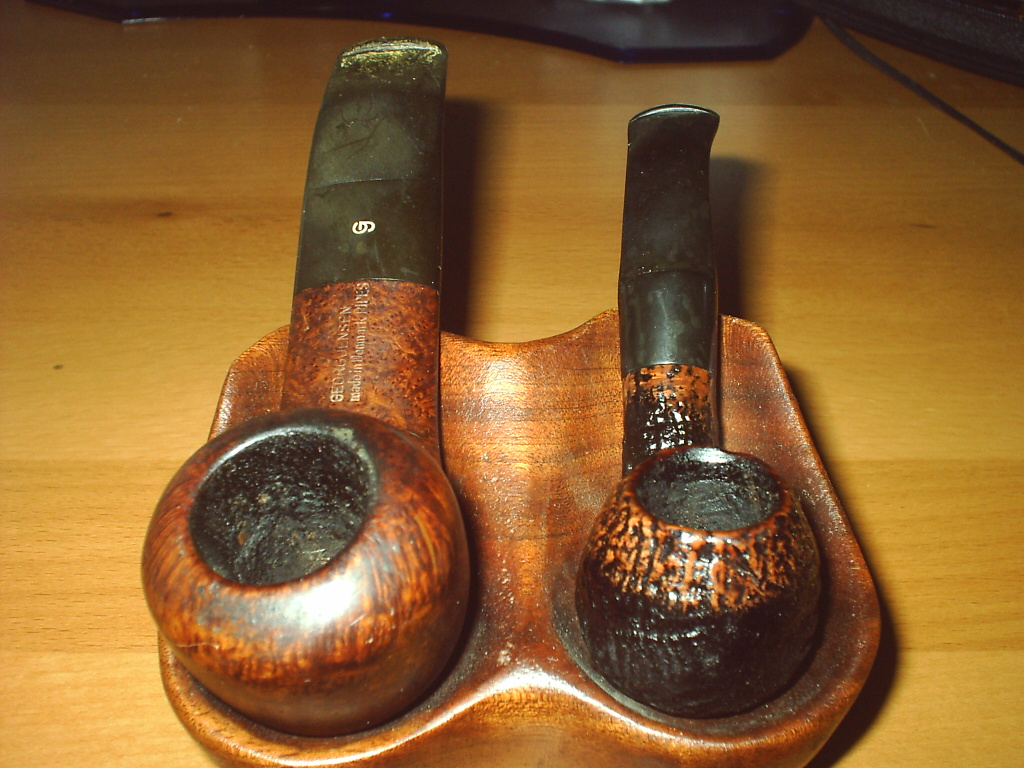
Two well-used tobacco pipes with different sized bowls. A narrow bowl permits low-temperature operation and more nutrient vapor reception.

A bowl, when referred to in pipe smoking, is the part of a smoking pipe or bong that is used to hold tobacco, cannabis, or other substances.

The exterior surface of the bowl of some pipes may be fashioned with some kind of design. The character Leopold Bloom, in James Joyce's Ulysses carries a tobacco pipe with the bowl carved into a head: "He carries a silverstringed inlaid dulcimer and a longstemmed bamboo Jacob's pipe, its clay bowl fashioned as a female head."

Thomas Curtis' London Encyclopaedia of 1839 describes a "fumigator", an instrument found in a doctor's surgery "for injecting tobacco smoke into the anus of drowned persons, with a view to excite the irritability of the muscles". Curtis describes the best as being made by a W. Willurgby "the bowl of which is of cast brass and is large enough to contain about an ounce and a half of tobacco".

Scholarly interest in the history of the evolution of the bowl of the clay tobacco pipe, extends as far back as 1863. In the 1860s antiquaries attempted to date clay pipe bowls by their evolving shapes and sizes.

The bowls of ceremonial pipes used in some indigenous American nations are often carved from red pipestone or catlinite, a fine-grained easily worked stone of a rich red color of the Coteau des Prairies, west of the Big Stone Lake in South Dakota. The pipestone quarries have traditionally been neutral ground among warring tribes, as people from multiple nations journeyed to the quarry to obtain the sacred pipestone. Sacred ceremonial pipes are not used for smoking intoxicants, but rather to offer prayers in a spiritual or religious ceremony.

== Terminology ==
Within modern American cannabis culture, the term "bowl" is often used as a synecdoche to refer to an entire smoking device, especially a glass pipe.

== See also ==
- Tobacco smoking
- Cannabis smoking
