= Rose Pizzo =

Italian American author (born 1932)

- Born: March 27, 1932 (age 94); Queens, New York
- Occupation: Author
- Known for: Growing Up Deaf

Rose Pizzo (born Easter 1932) is an Italian American author. She wrote the autobiography Growing Up Deaf with the help of her friend Judy Jonas, which tells the story of her life as a Deaf woman. This book was self-published through Xlibris. She is a prominent member of the Deaf Community and has won many awards for her efforts including the Fred Schreiber Golden Hands award.

== Early life ==
Rose Pizzo was born in Queens, New York, in 1932 during the Great Depression. She has an older sister by 13 months named Frances and a younger brother named Vincent. After her birth, her family moved from Queens to New Dorp, Staten Island because her parents could no longer afford to live in the city. However, her father had a shoemaking business in Queens and because the commute became too difficult, the family moved back to Queens for a short time. They moved to Corona and eventually settled in East Elmhurst.

She was born to a hearing family and though she did not become Deaf until age three, she has no recollection of hearing. She was sent to a mainstream kindergarten where she had no means of communication and was held back for two years. Then at age 8, she attended a public school for the deaf in Manhattan called P.S. 47. It was there that Pizzo first learned American Sign Language although the curriculum taught at P.S. 47 focused on writing and lip-reading skills and discouraged sign language, she picked it up from her peers. After P.S. 47, she attended Mabel Deaf Vocational High School, which was a mainstream program. No services were provided for Pizzo in the form of an interpreter or note taker so she was forced to lip-read in all her classes. She was able to pass by studying hard but eventually focused her studies in the vocational part of the school and studied sewing and dress-making.

== Career ==
Pizzo's first job out of high school was as a sewing machine operator where she worked for two years although she hated the job. She then worked as a data entry operator for many years. In 1978 she was one of the first students to attend the Adult Basic Education Program for the Deaf in Fair Lawn and received her high school equivalency diploma. After she graduated, she became a teacher's aide at the same school and held the position for over twenty years. She has also taught American Sign Language to hearing adults at the Fair Lawn Community School since the mid-1980s. Pizzo has been an active member of the North Jersey Community Center for the Deaf (NJCCD) and served on their Women's Auxiliary Group. She was appointed by the Governor to serve on the NJ Division of the Deaf Advisory Council. Pizzo also became very involved with the Union County College interpreting program and helped many students improve their interpreting skills. As a result, she was present with the Claudia Parson's Award by UCC for involvement in the Deaf community. She is also the recipient of the Fred Schreiber Golden Hands award.

== Personal life ==
Rose Pizzo first met her husband Vincent Pizzo when she was 7 years old on the bus going to their school for the Deaf P.S. 47. Their first date was not until 1950 when she was 18 and he was 24 and they were married on June 8, 1952. Vincent also was raised by hearing parents but unlike Rose, many of his siblings are also Deaf. They raised 3 children in Fair Lawn, New Jersey. Their oldest child Nancy was born in Barnet Hospital in 1956. Their daughter Karen was born in 1958 and their son Paul was born in 1962. They also have three grandchildren named Michelle, Vinnie, and Dominic.

== Growing Up Deaf (autobiography) ==
Rose Pizzo was encouraged to write a book about her life by her daughter-in-law Linda, who was fascinated with Rose's life as well as Deaf culture. She originally struggled while writing the book in English because American Sign Language is her native language. To solve this problem, she asked her friend and founder of the Adult Basic Education Program for the Deaf in Fair Lawn, Judy Jonas for help. Rose told her story to Judy who interpreted it onto an audio tape. The tape was them transcribed and Judy edited and translated it into English.

The book begins by talking about Rose's life growing up and childhood memory such as the story her Aunt away told about her birth, vacations her family took, and holidays. The book also describes her education growing up and her lack of language until she attended a school for the Deaf. In fact Rose did not even know her own name until she attended this school at age 8. When she was attending a hearing kinder garden, Rose describes how she had no communication and was picked on by other students. She goes into detail about the communication issues she faced throughout her entire life. Such as asking a family member question about what was going on and either getting a summary of the information or told nothing at all; like when one of her favorite cousins died. When she began her education at a Deaf school Rose described the experience as "the beginning of my life as a Deaf Person" (Pizzo). American Sign Language was forbidden at this school and hands were slapped for signing but she learned from other students and from the first time had access to real communication. The book also includes several stories of her friend's family's rejections of ASL. Rose's parents never had a problem with ASL although they were ignorant of the Deaf world and she was forced to wear hearing aids. The book also provides cultural information about Deaf people, such as the importance of name signs and how they are chosen as well as explaining the benefits TTY's and captioning had on the Deaf community.
