= Merry Company (Buytewech) =

Painting by Dutch artist Willem Buytewech

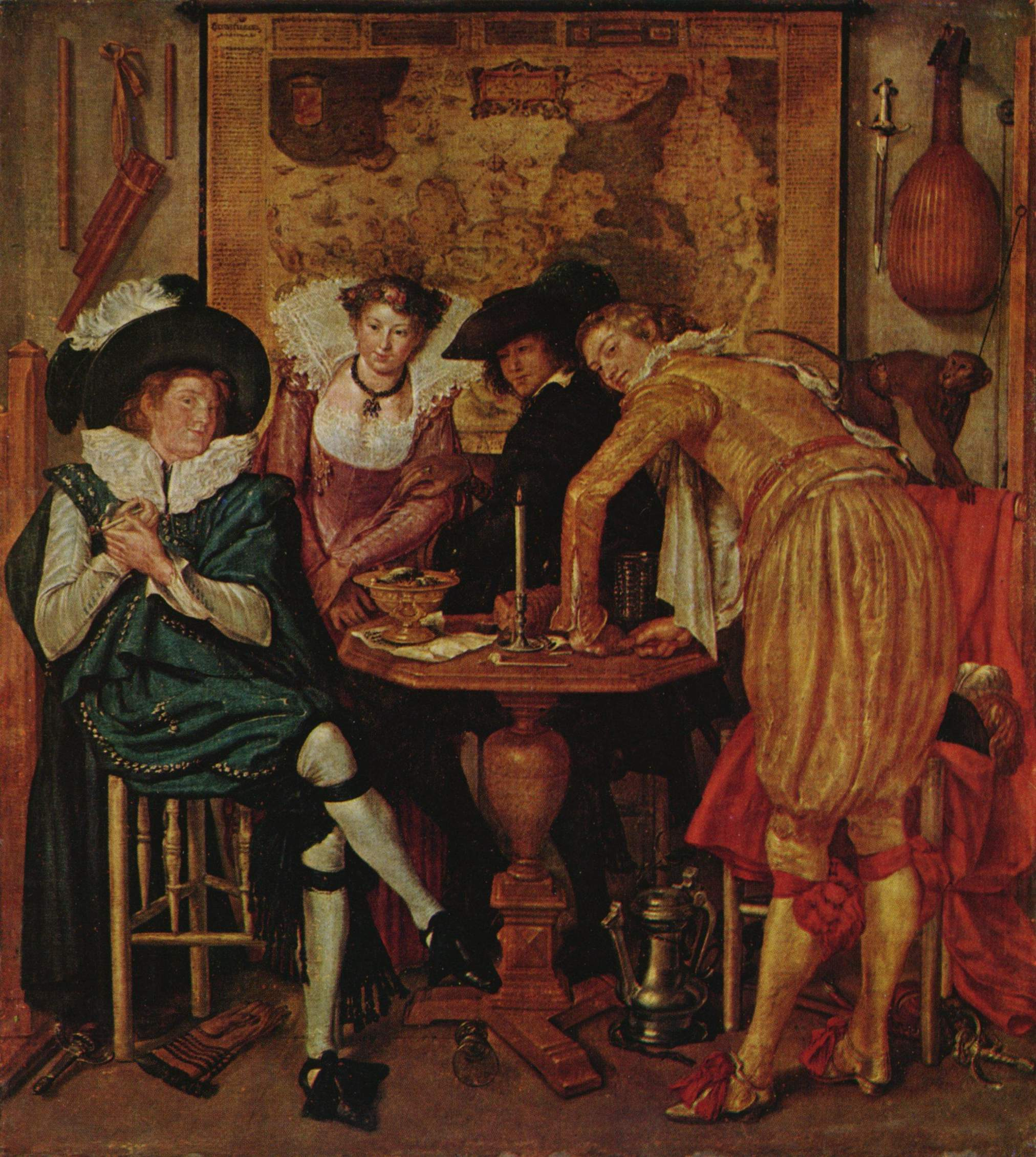
Merry Company (c. 1620-1622) by Willem Pieterszoon Buytewech

Merry Company is a c. 1620–1622 painting by the Dutch artist Willem Pieterszoon Buytewech, now in the Museum of Fine Arts, in Budapest. It belongs to the merry company sub-genre of the genre painting.

== Sources ==
- http://www.wga.hu/html/b/buytewec/merry_co.html
