= Salvatore Pizzo =

American pathologist

Salvatore Vincent Pizzo is an American scientist and Distinguished Professor of Pathology at Duke University Medical Center. Pizzo was elected Fellow of the American Association for the Advancement of Science in 2000 for his research on blood vessel cell receptors on tumor growth. Pizzo was chair of Duke's Department of Pathology and director of the Medical Scientist Training Program. He received the Dean's Award for Excellence in Mentoring 2004.

Pizzo earned his PhD (1972) and MD (1973) from Duke University.

In 2002, Leslie Dodd sued Pizzo and Duke University for discrimination, harassment and infliction of emotional distress. An expensive piece of equipment was ordered without Dodd's knowledge, allegedly in retaliation for ending a relationship with Pizzo. This purchase generated ill will toward Dodd and developed into a hostile work environment. The court judgement sided with the Title VII claims of hostile work environment, sex discrimination, and retaliation, but denied as the Title VII claim of quid pro quo sexual harassment. This case is notable and cited in legal studies regarding differences betweenTitle VII and Title IX claims, and how institutions are held accountable for quid pro quo harassment.

In 2024, eight papers authored by Pizzo and coauthored with Uma Kant Misra were retracted for apparent image duplication. These papers were published in The Journal of Cellular Biochemistry and PLOS One between 2004 and 2014.
