= GCC Standardization Organization =

Standards organization for Yemen and Gulf Cooperation Council member states

- Abbreviation: GSO
- Official languages: English; Arabic
- Website: www.gso.org.sa

The GCC Standardization Organization (GSO) is a standards organization for the member states of the Gulf Cooperation Council and Yemen.

It was established under the authority of the Gulf Cooperation Council. Its full official name is "The Standardization Organization of the Cooperation Council for the Arab States of the Gulf". It is headquartered in Riyadh and has a branch office in Jeddah.

Where no GSO standard already exists, it reviews existing global standards and may adopt them. The GSO's Technical Council mandated the creation of a regional Metrology Organization to be called "GULFME". The GSO has also partnered with PepsiCo.

The current secretary-general of the GSO is H.E. Nabil A Molla. A previous secretary-general was Dr. Rashid Ahmed Muhammad Bin Fahad.

As of 2010, the GSO has mandated some 2,700 standards. Implementation of these standards is the responsibility of individual member countries of the GCC.

== Domains of standards ==
The GSO's standardization initiatives cover a wide range of domains. These include:

- Water
- Fire protection
- Halal foods
- Cigars and cigarettes
- Food safety

== GSO standards for cigarettes ==
The GSO has laid down clear standards with regards to two aspects of cigarettes – product content and labelling and packaging of tobacco packages. These are clearly specified in GSO 597/2009 which deals with technical regulation related to cigarettes and GSO 246/2011 which relates to the labelling of packages of tobacco products.

Every draft regulation is given to a particular country out of the 6 GCC countries to be prepared and is then approved by the remaining 5 countries. For example, GSO 597/2009 was prepared by Qatar while GSO 246/2011 was prepared by UAE. It is GSO 246/2011 regulation that specifies all cigarette packs destined to be sold in GCC should have warnings covering 50% of the front and back principal areas and include from among a set of specified images and text comprising Arabic on the front face and English on the rear face.
