= Drug pipe =

Glass pipe associated with recreational drug use

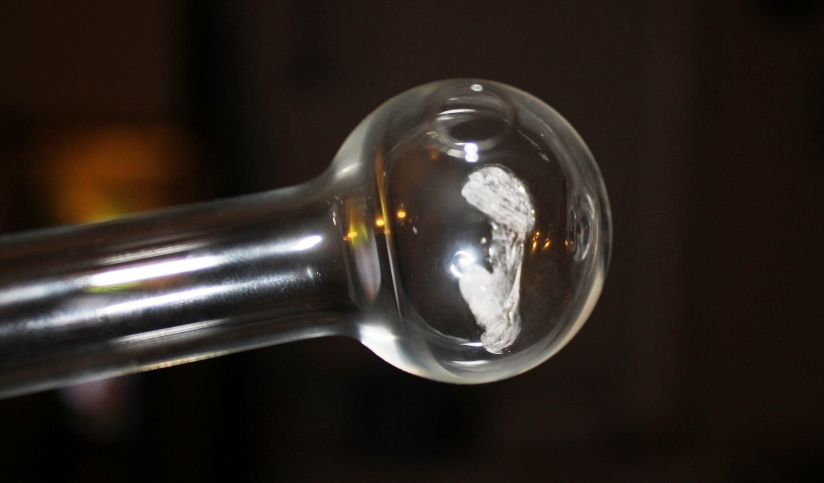
Glass meth pipe

Drug pipes are vessels used as drug paraphernalia to aid the smoking of hard drugs. They usually consist of a glass tube with or without a bulb, the latter particularly used when freebasing crack cocaine, and the former when vaporising methamphetamine.

Many articles of drug paraphernalia are sold under intentionally misleading names and product descriptions to skirt regulation and to refer to their function euphemistically.

== Methamphetamine pipe ==
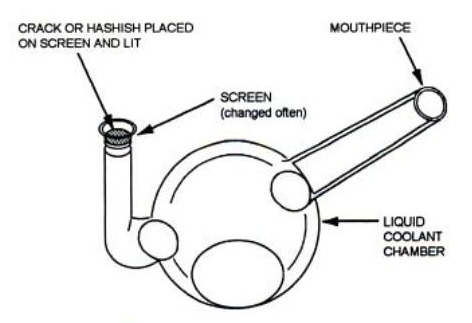
Crack pipe diagram

A methamphetamine pipe is a glass pipe which consists of a tube connected to a spherical bulb with a small opening on top designed for smoking methamphetamine. A pipe that has been used will have carbon deposit on the exterior of the bulb and white or gray crystal residues on the inner surface. Alternate names include pizzo, tooter pilo, horn, bubble, tweak pipe, meth pipe, gack pipe, crank pipe, crack pipe, pookie pipe, chicken bone, or ice pipe.

They can also ostensibly be used for legal purposes, including applying the hole "on the top of an eucalyptus bottle" for inhaling aromas or moisture. However, there is a lack of evidence that such devices are used in this manner.

These pipes are often sold at head shops and convenience stores.

Pizzos are often advertised as "oil burners" or "mystic vases" designed for burning incense oils. Wish has listed the glass item as a "Colored Glass Oil Burner Pipe" and received criticism from the Queensland government as the region struggled to battle the rising use of methamphetamine.

== Love rose ==
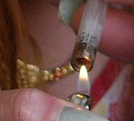
A love rose, used to smoke crack cocaine

A love rose is a glass tube with a paper or plastic rose inside of it, with a bit of cork or foil on each end to keep the rose from falling out. It is also known as a glass rose. The primary use of a "love rose" is as a pipe to smoke crack cocaine. They are commonly sold at convenience stores in the United States, particularly in inner-city ghetto locations.

== Fentanyl pipe ==
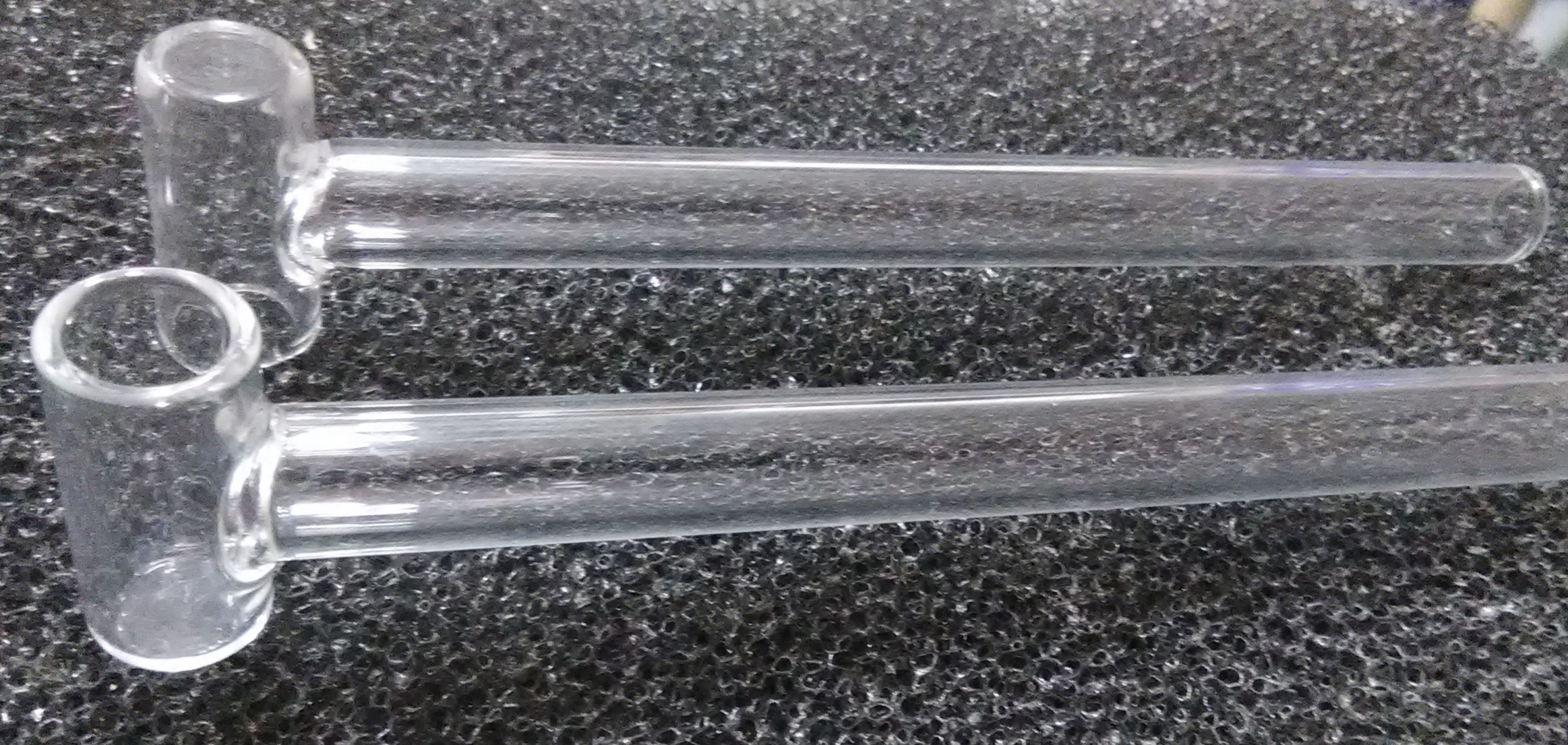
Hammer shaped fentanyl pipe

A fentanyl pipe is a hammer-shaped pipe used to smoke fentanyl, which is often sold in "chunks".

== See also ==
- Bong
- Drug paraphernalia
- One-hitter (smoking)
- Tobacco pipe
