= Chalice (pipe) =

Type of cannabis smoking pipe

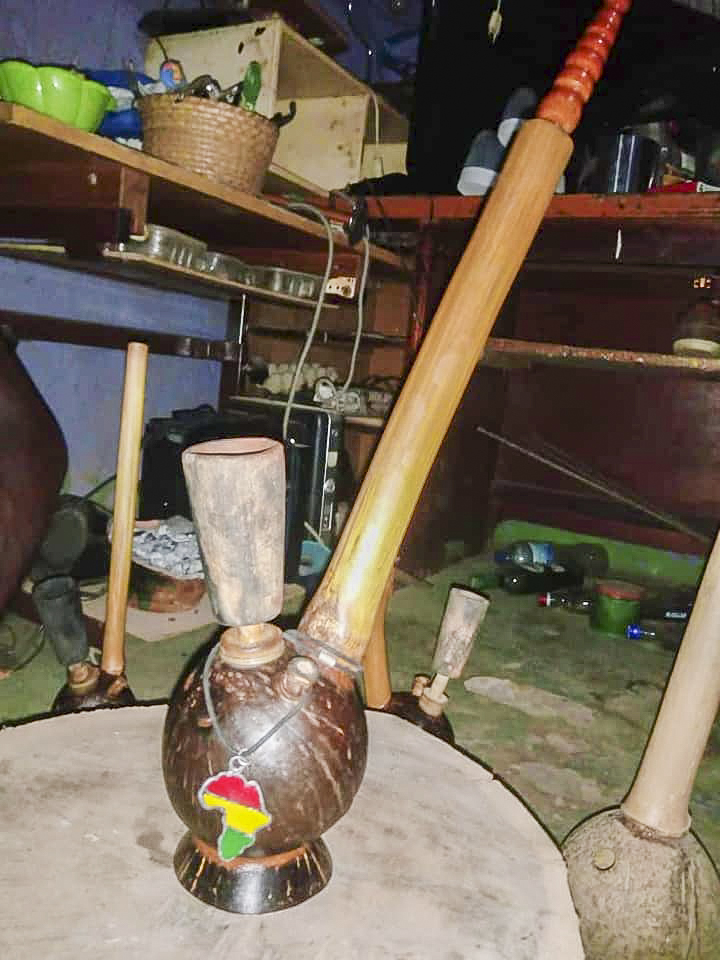
Chalice

A chalice, also known as a wisdom chalice or chillum chalice, is a type of cannabis smoking pipe used most often by members of the Jamaican Rastafari movement. It is a type of water pipe used for smoking.

== Design ==
It is a type of water pipe with a hose or drawtube for inhaling; the water cools and filters the smoke. The hose provides additional airspace for cooling. A screen embedded in the crater protects against drawing in burning particles to clog the interior. The marijuana is finely cut and placed on top of a clay cone, called "kutchie".

== Spiritual practice ==
The word chalice (along other permutations such as chalwa, chali, etc.) is often used to refer to marijuana itself, which certain Rastafari consider to be of specific religious importance as they believe it is a gift from Jah. The term "lick the chalice" refers to Rasta communing with Jah. A group of practitioners gather in a communal meeting, known as "groundations," a prayer is said, and the chalice lit and passed counter-clockwise among the group.

A bong-like chillum equipped with a water filtration chamber is sometimes referred to as a chalice, based on a quote from the Biblical book of Deuteronomy. Thanks and praises are offered to Jah before smoking the chillum.

== See also ==
- Chillum (pipe)
