= Kiseru =

Japanese smoking pipe

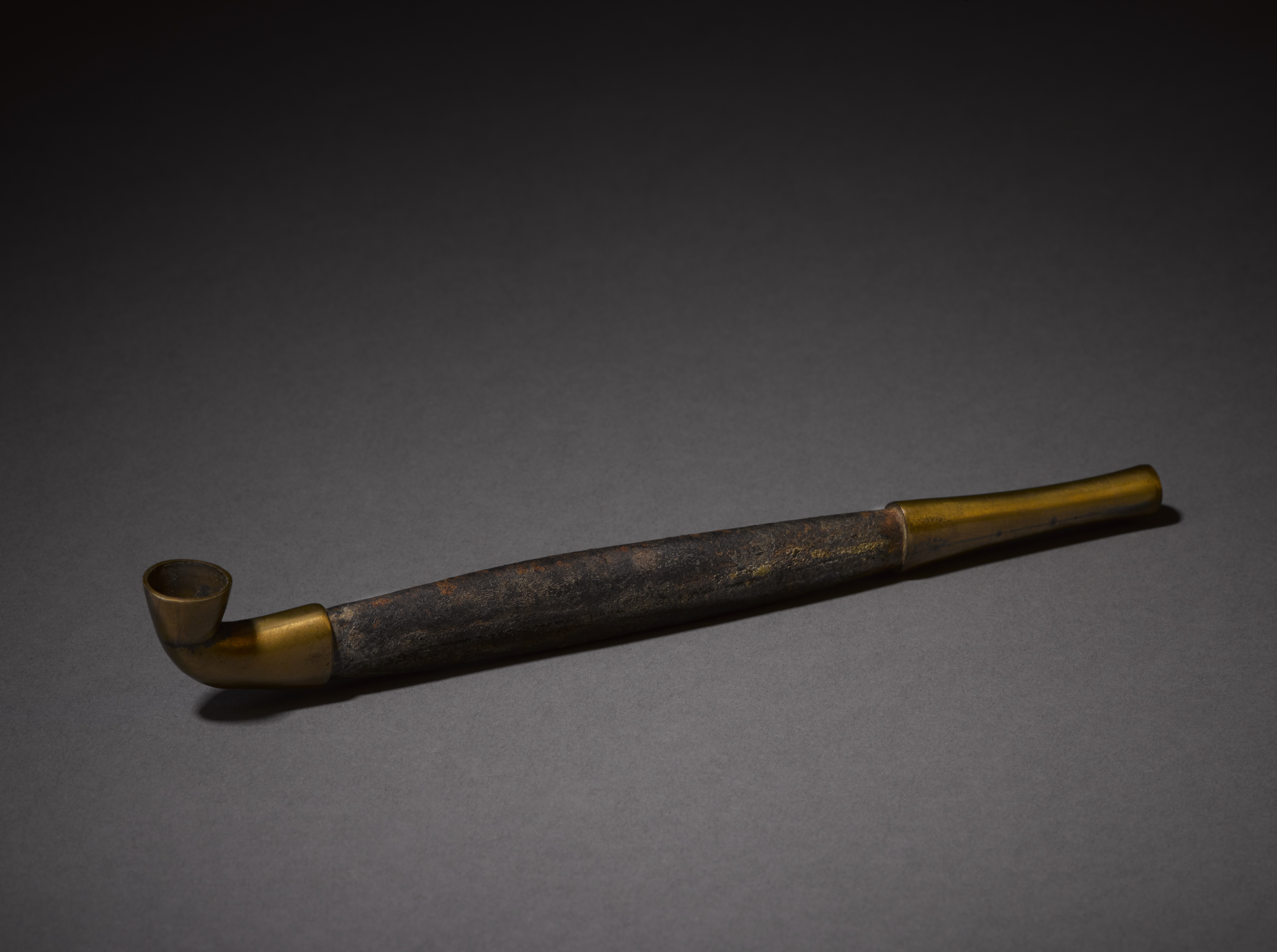
Kiseru smoking pipe, before 1894, from the Oxford College Archives of Emory University

A kiseru (煙管; [ki̥seɾɯ]) is a Japanese smoking pipe, traditionally used for smoking kizami, a finely shredded tobacco product resembling hair.

== History ==
The word kiseru is said to have originated from the Portuguese que sorver ("which is drawn").

It is believed that pipe smoking was introduced to Japanese high society, such as the samurai, the Buddhist priest classes and rich merchants.

Tobacco has been known in Japan since the 1570s at the earliest. By the early 17th century, kiseru had become popular enough to even be mentioned in some Buddhist textbooks for children. The kiseru evolved along with the equipment and use of incense associated with the Japanese incense ceremony, kōdō:

- The kō-bon, an incense tray, became the tabako-bon, a tobacco tray.
- The kōro, an incense burner, became the hi-ire, a tobacco embers pot.
- The incense pot became the hai-otoshi or hai-fuki, a jar to contain the ash.

During the Edo period, many samurai and chōnin smoked tobacco, and often carried a kiseru in a special case called a kiseruzutsu. Kiseru were considered status symbols for their owners, due to being made from precious metals and having intricate designs adorned on them. There was also a high cost on importing tobacco, which was considered an extravagance of the rich.

The kiseru would be the main way to smoke tobacco until after the Meiji Restoration of 1868, when cigarettes were introduced and rapidly became popular. However, kiseru would remain popular in rural areas and among people wishing to preserve its culture. By 1929, there were 190 workshops and 400 artisans producing kiseru in Japan. Nowadays, there are only a few artisans left still making kiseru. However, there remains some interest in kiseru and its aesthetics among the youth.

The word kiseru today is more commonly used to refer to the practice of defrauding the railway system by buying two cheap tickets to get past the entrance and exit gates while not paying for the distance between them. This is likened to a kiseru as there is only metal at the ends, and nothing in the middle, a metaphor indicating that money (metal) only covers the beginning and end.

== Construction ==
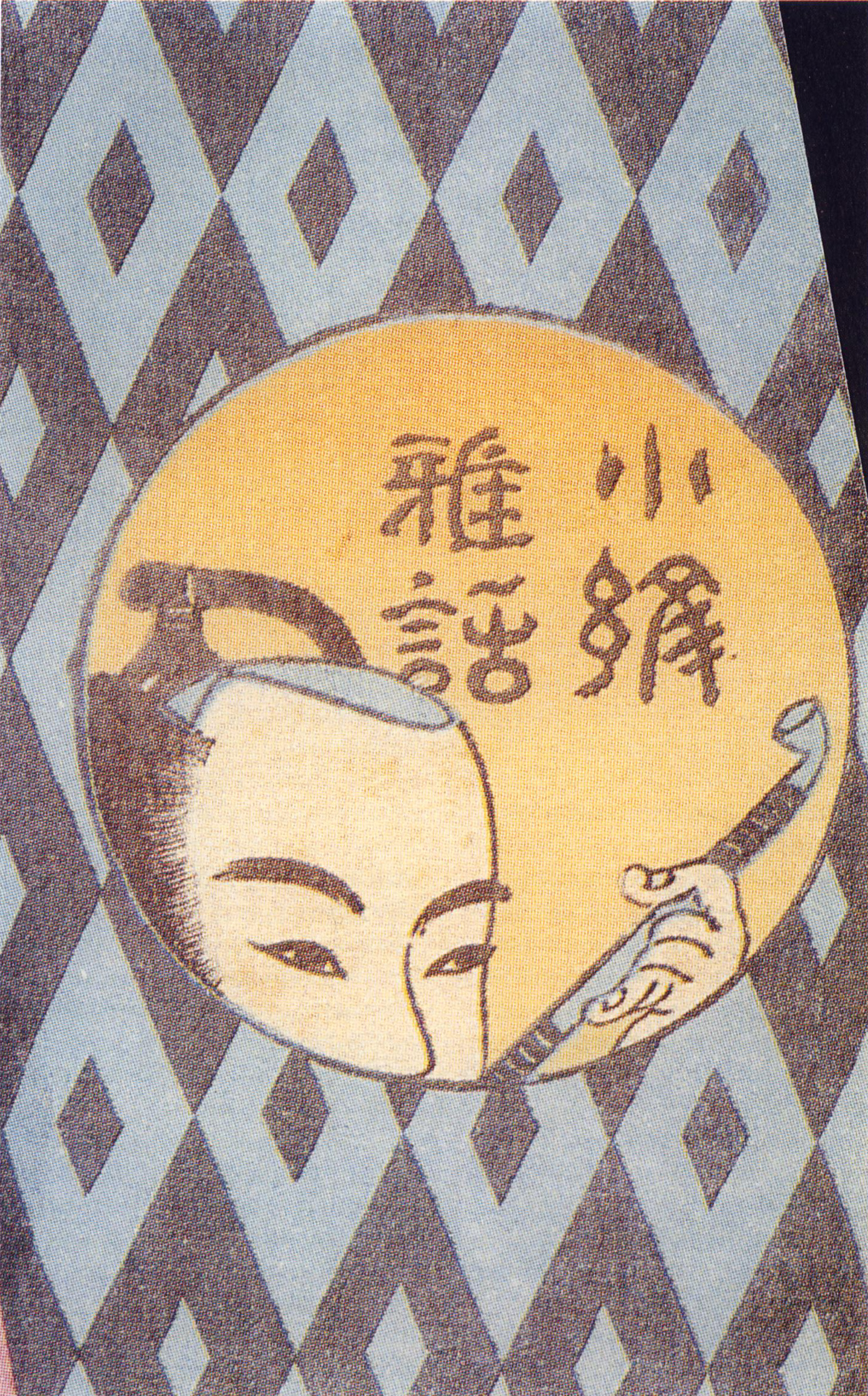
A man smoking a kiseru. Illustration of the cover of the novel Komon gawa ("Elegant chats on fabric design") by Santō Kyōden, 1790.

There are two main types of kiseru: rau kiseru, which are made of three parts; the mouthpiece (吸口, suikuchi), stem (羅宇, rau), and shank (雁首, gankubi), and nobe kiseru, which are made with a single piece of metal.

Metal such as brass or silver is beaten to shape the mouthpiece and bowl, then the sides are joined with silver solder. The mouthpiece and bowl are often engraved with intricate and decorative designs.

== Kiseru as a weapon ==
The length of a typical kiseru usually measured between 6 and 10 inches (15 and 25 cm), and their metal ends made them suitable impromptu self-defence weapons in emergencies.

Much heavier and longer kiseru were often carried by common people living on the fringes of society, such as the yakuza, gamblers, and gangsters, which were designed to be used as weapons. These pipes were called kenka kiseru (喧嘩煙管; fighting pipes), ranging anywhere from 12 to 18 inches (30 to 46 cm). These pipes were often made of cast iron or brass, making them effective truncheon-like weapons for striking opponents.

The samurai were also known to use kiseru as weapons, often for rare occasions when a samurai would be parted with his swords but still required a means of self-defense. Like the kenka kiseru, they were made completely from cast iron or brass and were called buyōkiseru. A typical buyōkiseru was about 16 inches (41 cm) long, and could be easily carried in an obi without raising suspicion.

Because kiseru were so often used as weapons during the Edo period, several classical martial arts schools incorporated secret techniques into their curricula. A style of fighting armed with a kiseru was commonly referred to as kiseru-jutsu, and used similar techniques to those used in tessenjutsu.

== See also ==
- Midwakh
- Sebsi

== General and cited references ==
- Sander L. Gilman and Zhou Xun, eds. (2004). Smoke: a global history of smoking. ISBN 1-86189-200-4.
