= Midwakh =

Arabian smoking pipe

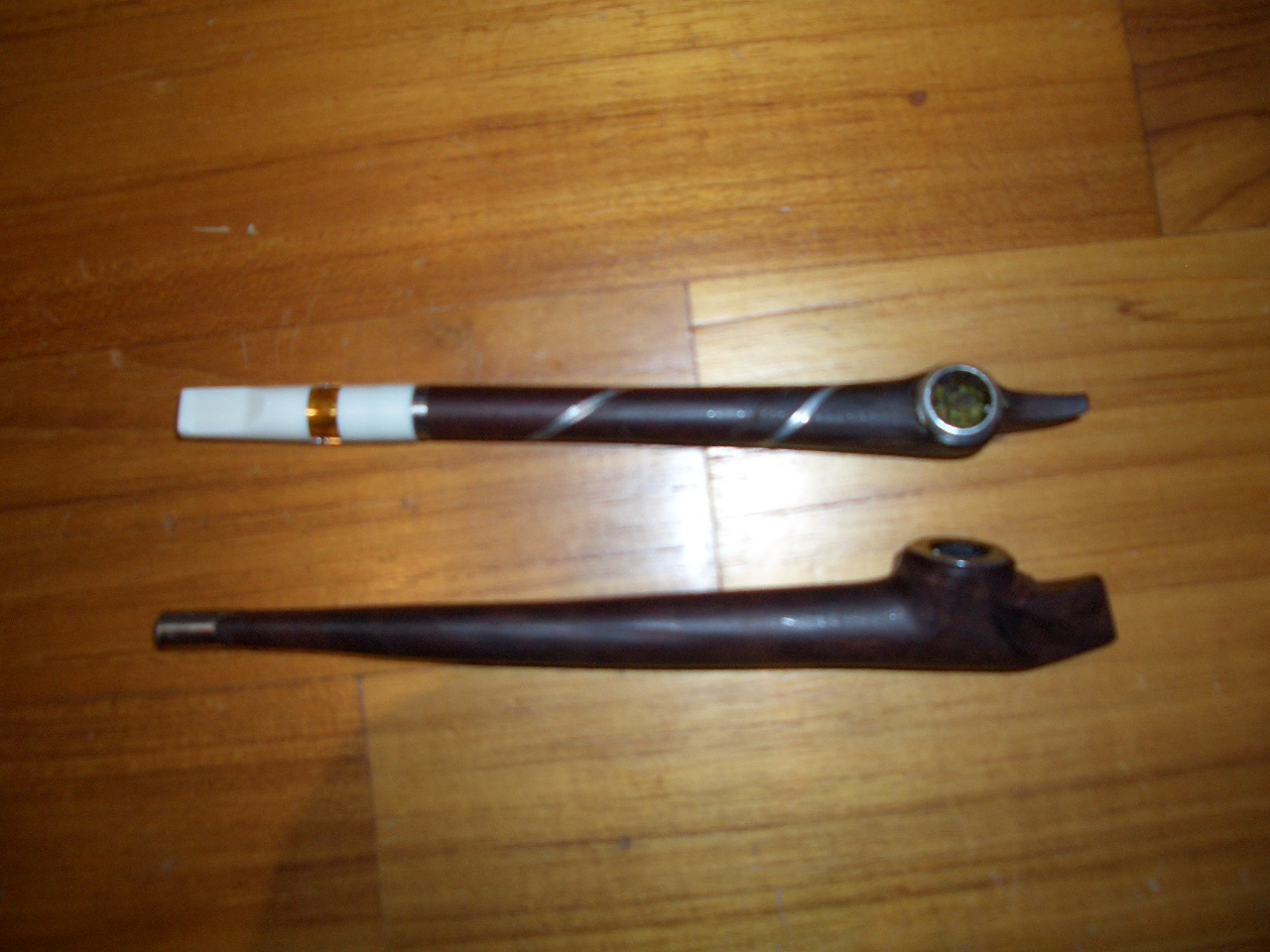
Variant of midwakh pipe with stem-mounted filter, above, and traditional pipe, below.

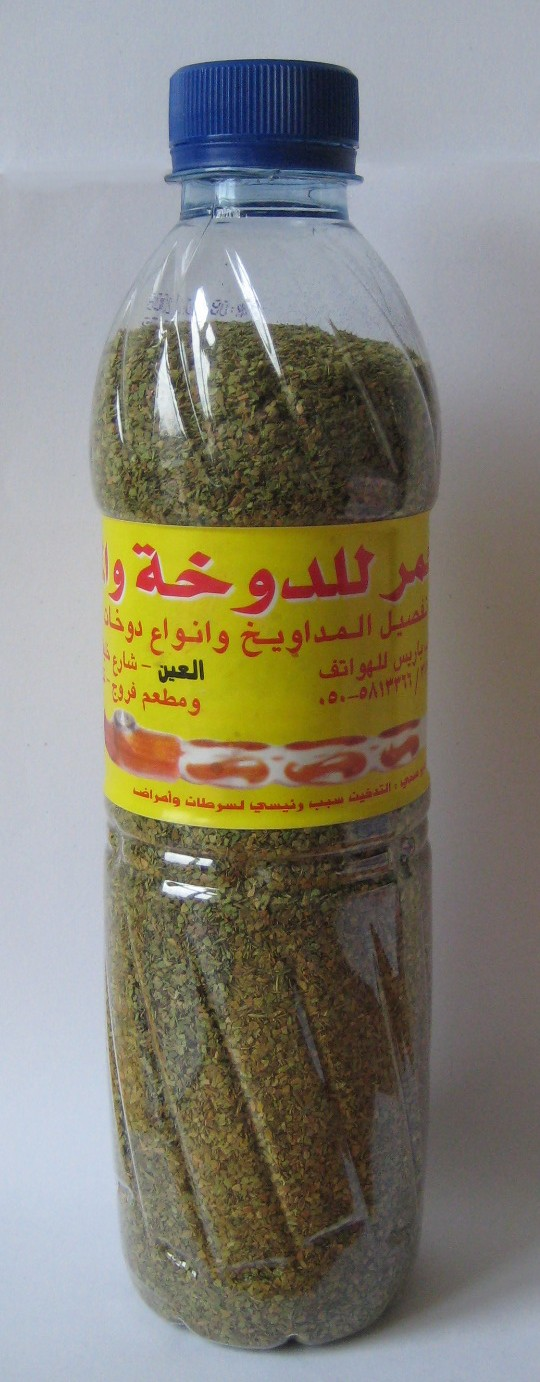
A bottle of sifted dokha from a local vendor in the United Arab Emirates.

A midwakh (Arabic: مدواخ, also spelled medwakh) is a small smoking pipe of Arabian origin, in which dokha (دوخة), a sifted Iranian tobacco product mixed with aromatic leaf and bark herbs, is smoked. The bowl of a midwakh pipe is typically smaller than that of a traditional western tobacco pipe. It is usually loaded by dipping the bowl into a container of dokha flakes.

Midwakh are primarily produced in the United Arab Emirates, and are especially popular in Abu Dhabi and Al Ain.

== Construction ==
The pipes may be custom made, by allowing the smoker to specify the dimensions and design, and even letters and symbols. Many in the UAE have chicken symbols on the pipe. Midwakh are crafted from a variety of materials including wood, bone, base metal, marble, steel, gold, silver, plastic (with a metal bowl), or glass. They may incorporate precious items such as diamonds, gemstones and rings of precious metal inscribed with symbols, such as a falcon similar to the one shown in the emblem of the UAE. The pipe may be crafted to resemble a dromedary camel, a highly revered animal in the UAE; the opening of the bowl shaped as the camel's mouth, with a small hole connected to a metal shaft inside the body of the pipe to conduct the smoke to the user. Among many modern variations of the midwakh, some are covertly disguised as pens, some can be split apart for cleaning, and some can have double bowls or double stems. Most midwakhs crafted today have a mouthpiece sized to fit a plastic filter.

== See also ==
- Dokha
- Kiseru
