= Sebsi =

Traditional Moroccan cannabis pipe

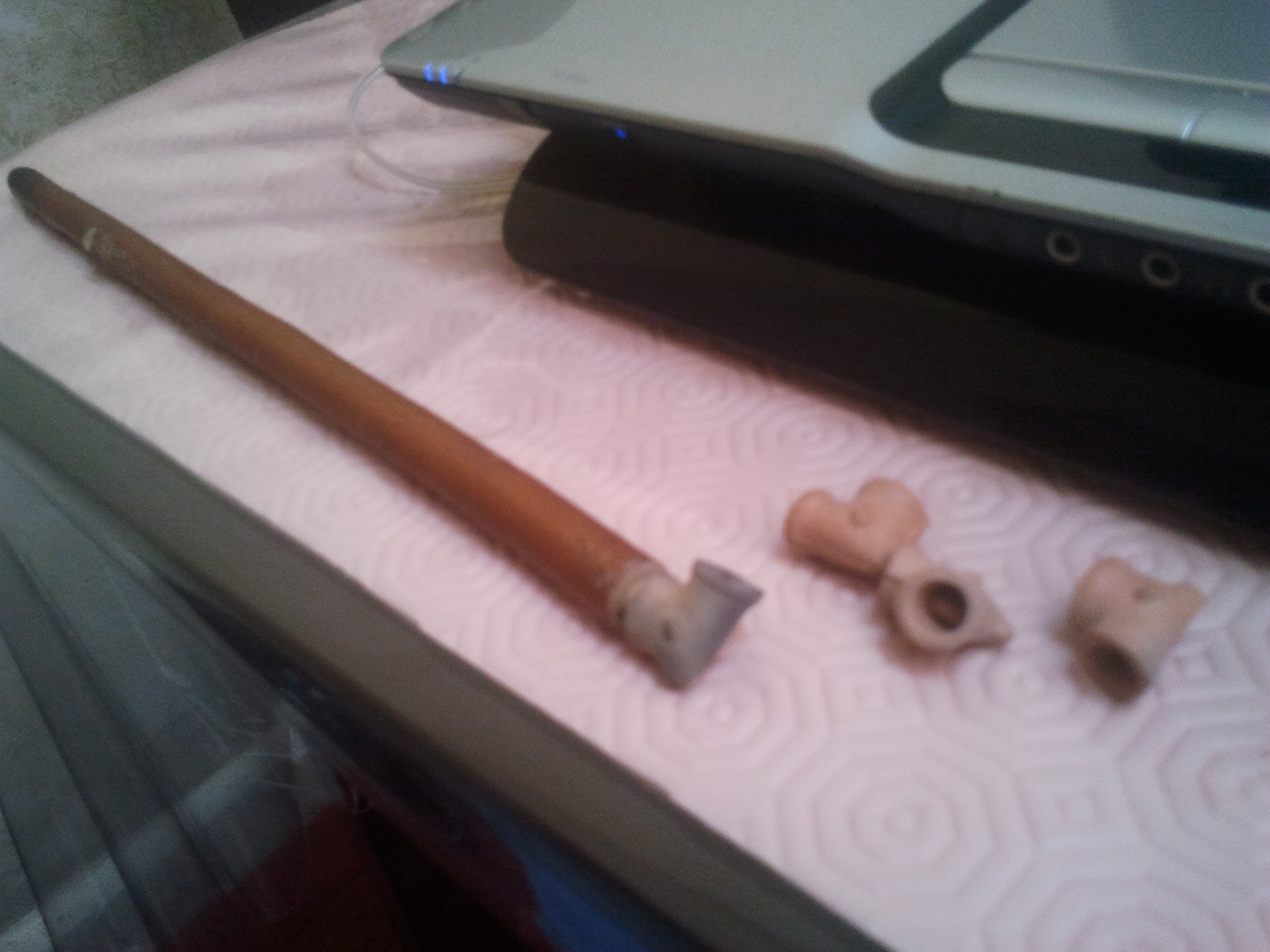
Sebsi

A sebsi or sibsi (Berber: ⵙⴱⵙⵉ) is a traditional Moroccan cannabis pipe with a narrow clay bowl called a skuff (or shkaff), with a fine metal screen. To this a hardwood stem is attached, which may be up to 46 cm (18 in) long.

The sebsi has traditionally been used to smoke kief, which in Morocco refers to the best parts of the cannabis finely chopped and mixed with tobacco or other herbs. The sebsi provides a small, low-temperature serving of herb (usually about 25 mg), compared with larger traditional smoking devices like the chillum of India and Jamaica.
