= Gravity bong =

Device used for smoking tobacco, cannabis or herbs

A gravity bong, also known as a GB, bucket bong, grav, geeb, gibby, yoin, spleeg, or ghetto bong, is a method of consuming smokable substances such as cannabis. The term describes both a bucket bong and a waterfall bong, since both use air pressure and water to draw smoke. A lung uses similar equipment but instead of water draws the smoke by removing a compacted plastic bag or similar from the chamber.

The bucket bong is made out of two containers, with the larger, open-top container filled with water. The smaller has an attached bowl and open bottom, and the smaller is placed into the larger. Once the bowl is lit, the operator must move the small container up, causing a pressure difference. Smoke slowly fills the small jar until the user removes the bowl and inhales the contents. A waterfall bong is made up of only one container. The container must have a bowl and a small hole near the base so the water can drain easily. As the water flows out of the container, air is forced through the bowl and causes the substance to burn and accumulate smoke in the bong. However, none of them in their usual construction does actually fit the definition of a bong, as the smoke is not made to bubble through the water in order to cool and filter it.

== Types ==
=== Cup ===
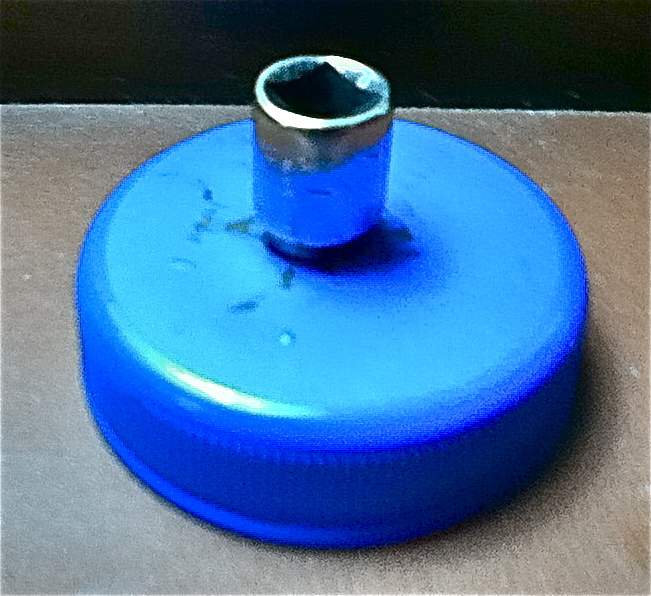
The bottle's lid

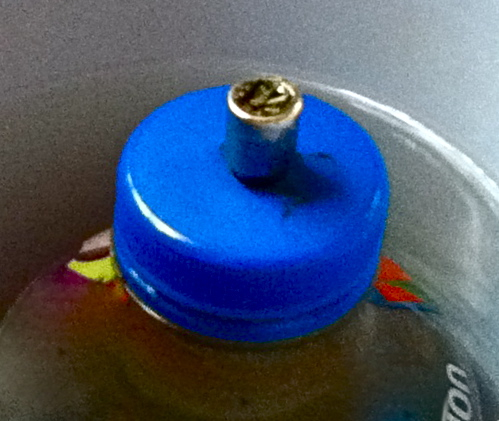
The bong, ready for operation

The construction of a bucket bong (or simply a "bucket") calls for a plastic bottle (about 2 litres (0.53 US gal)), a bowl (either purpose-made or a suitable substitute such as a hex bit socket), an aerator screen cut to fit the bowl, and a large bucket or other container into which both the bottle and a sufficient amount of water will properly go. The plastic bottle's base is cut off, and the bottle's cap has a small hole in the center which will eventually hold a bowl. The screen is placed inside of the bowl. The cut nozzle is threaded into the hole outside the cap.

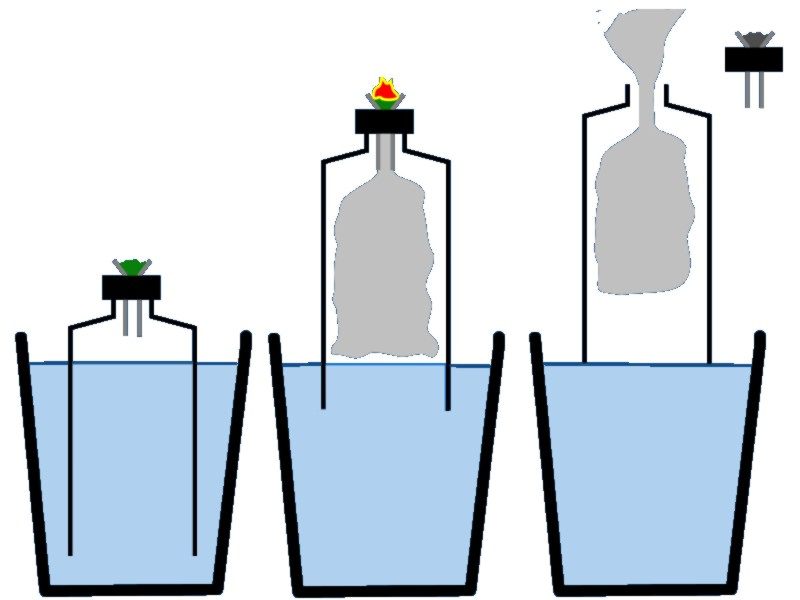
Diagram of bucket bong in operation

The cap is then packed with a smokable substance and screwed onto the bottle once it is immersed to its neck in liquid. While lighting the bowl with (preferably) a lighter or match, the bottle is gradually lifted until it is about to come out of the water or when the substance ceases burning. While the bottle is held in place, the lid is removed, the user's mouth is placed on the bottle opening, and the user inhales as the bottle is pushed back down into the water. The cause of the smoke being expelled by the bottle's movement is the rise in internal pressure, created when the water volume increases; the smoke enters the lungs in a "smoother" manner than inhaling from a joint, blunt, or bowl by itself. This will give the smoker a sudden dose with hardly any smoke lost, rather than the amount of smoke lost with joints and blunts. Once it is burned and raised, the smoke can simply be breathed in while suspended in the chamber, leaving return of the bottle to the water for additional upward pressure during inhalation essentially a matter of preference.

Author Brian Griffin—who also wrote under a pseudonym—noted the aesthetic downside of a gravity bong to be that it looks like "something a janitor whipped up using items from his closet." Griffin also wrote that the bong is quite difficult to conceal, saying: "they can be hard to hide if civic-minded parents or parole officers plan on making visits." An author under the pseudonym Will B. High insisted that the bucket bong's existence was "indisputable evidence" that marijuana smokers were more intelligent and inventive than one might assume. I. M. Stoned, author of Weed: 420 Things You Didn't Know (or Remember) about Cannabis called the bucket bong "out of the world" and "killer sweet."

The gravity bong is often referred to as a "Buckie" in the Southern Hemisphere.

=== Waterfall ===
Diagram of waterfall bong in operation

A waterfall bong (or reverse bucket bong) is another method of smoking. It is assembled using a large plastic bottle (preferably two liters), a bung or rubber stopper, a brass cut nozzle to act as a bowl and keep the marijuana (or other material) from entering the bottle, and an aerator screen. Once the bottle is filled to its neck in water the lid is screwed on, removing the rubber stopper and igniting the contents of the bowl leads to draining water to cause smoke to be drawn into the bottle. The cap is removed after the water has completely drained out, allowing the user to inhale the smoke.

This construction can be made into a full featured bong by incorporating a long downstem (or chillum) that the bowl plugs or threads into and that preferably ends just above the drain hole with either a full calibre orifice or some sort of diffuser (slits or small holes penetrating the wall of the stem just above the plugged end) so that most of the smoke will bubble through a water column (although decreasing in height over time) and only a small quantity at the very end of the draw (when the water level has fallen below the orifices) will enter the bottle untreated.

=== Lung, parachute or bread bag ===
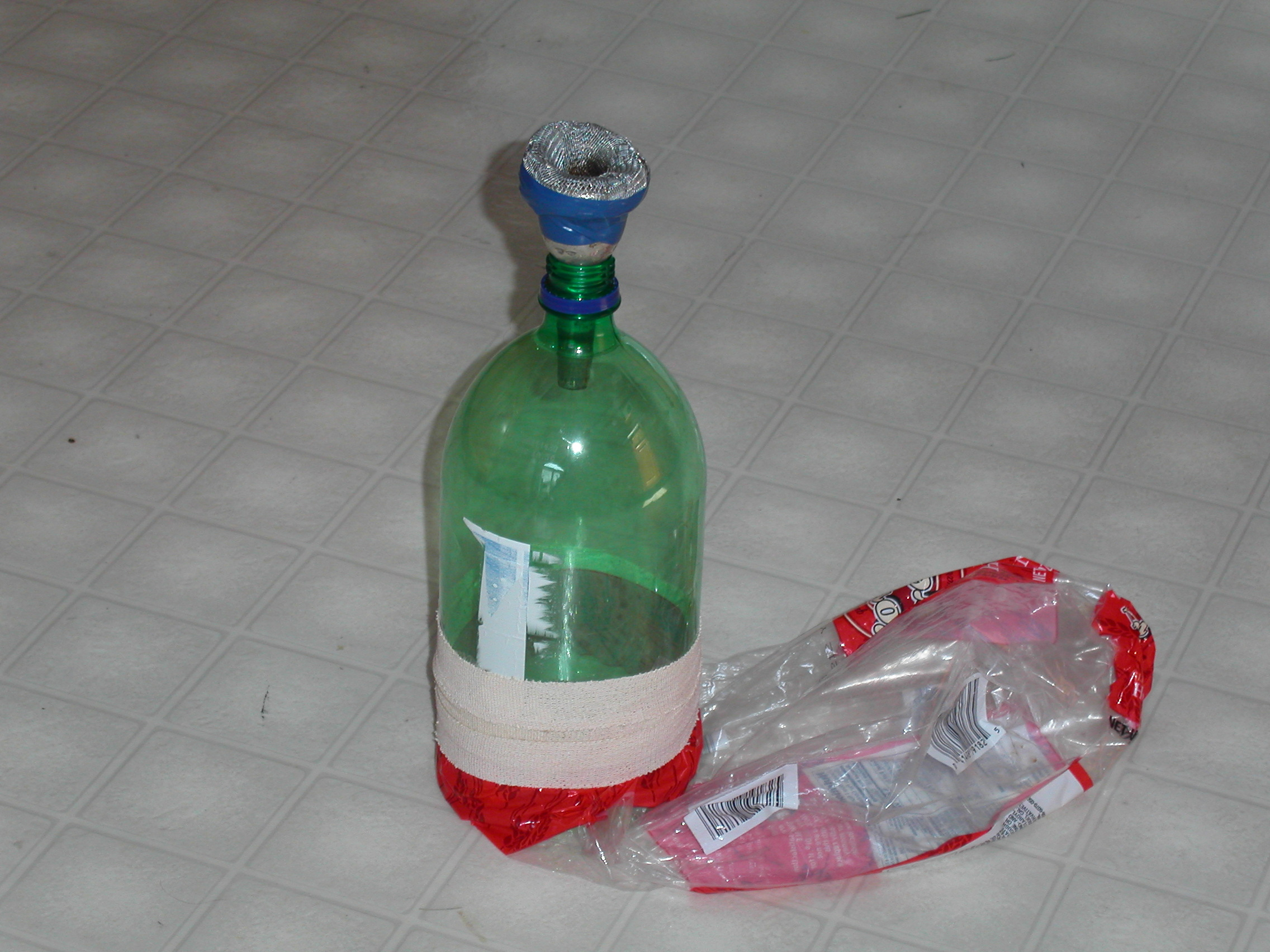
A "lung" or "parachute bong" with the bag pulled out of the chamber

A lung, also known as a parachute pipe/bong and a bread bag bong, is a device similar to both a gravity bucket bong and a waterfall, but which does not use water (and therefore is more portable), instead using suction created by placing an airtight malleable object into the smoke chamber, which is withdrawn to pull smoke into the vacated space. In its crudest form, it requires only an upper chamber and a taped plastic grocery bag or similar to provide the suction. Strings are often added by solo users to assist the pulling, as the device requires to be both held upright and burned using hands, but can be raised steadily with the string (anchored) holding the bag in its original position to create the vacuum.

In the early 21st century, more sophisticated commercial smoking devices were produced for countries where cannabis was decriminalized. One example, with a flat base and a concertina-style chamber that would expand to create the suction smoke chamber and contract to force the smoke into the users lungs, and for storage, was named Bukket but more similar to a lung in its method.

== Consumption method comparisons ==
The bong is typically used for cannabis and generally not recommended for tobacco smoking or herbal uses. It is often marketed for use with tobacco, especially where marijuana smoking is illegal. The pressure created by the action of inhaling smoke into the user's lungs is very low when using a waterfall, contrary to other smoking devices, as gravity fills the chamber with smoke, creating less work for the smoker's lungs. The gravity bong differs from water pipes and water bongs in that it does not bubble the smoke through the water. Vaporizers do not produce smoke, but the inhalation process is similar. A joint can contain from 0.4 g to well over 1 g and blunts can contain up to 3 g of cannabis, while the bucket bong only uses about 0.1 to 0.3 g.

== Legal status ==
In the United States, under the Federal Drug Paraphernalia Statute, which is part of the Controlled Substances Act, it is illegal to sell, transport through the mail, transport across state lines, import, or export drug paraphernalia, meaning that the bong is illegal. Since California, Colorado, Washington, and several other states have legalized recreational use of the herb, gravity bongs (along with other related paraphernalia) can be legally sold to anyone over the age of 21. In countries and states where use of cannabis is illegal, some retailers insist that bongs are intended for use with tobacco in an attempt to circumvent laws against selling drug paraphernalia. While technically the term "bong" does not mean a device used for smoking mainly marijuana, drug-related connotations have formed within the word itself (partly due to punning with Sanskrit bhangah, meaning "hemp"). Thus for fear of the law some head shops will not serve customers who use the word "bong" or "bongs", typically insisting instead on the term "water pipe".

== See also ==
- One-hitter (smoking)
- Operation Pipe Dreams
- Water pipe percolator
