= Head shop =

Retail outlet for cannabis and tobacco products

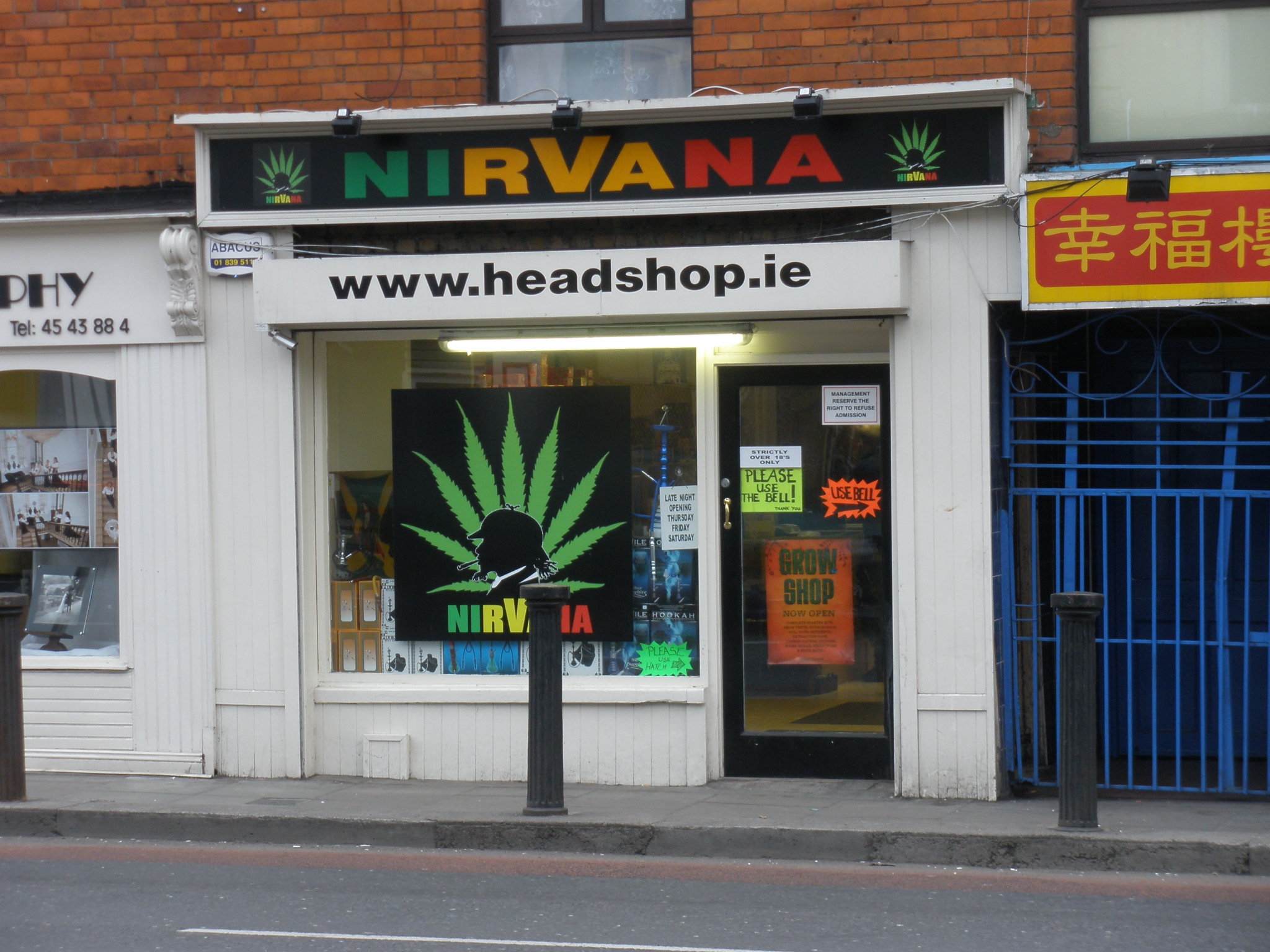
The "Nirvana" head shop in Dublin, Ireland. A large image of a cannabis leaf adorns the front of the store.

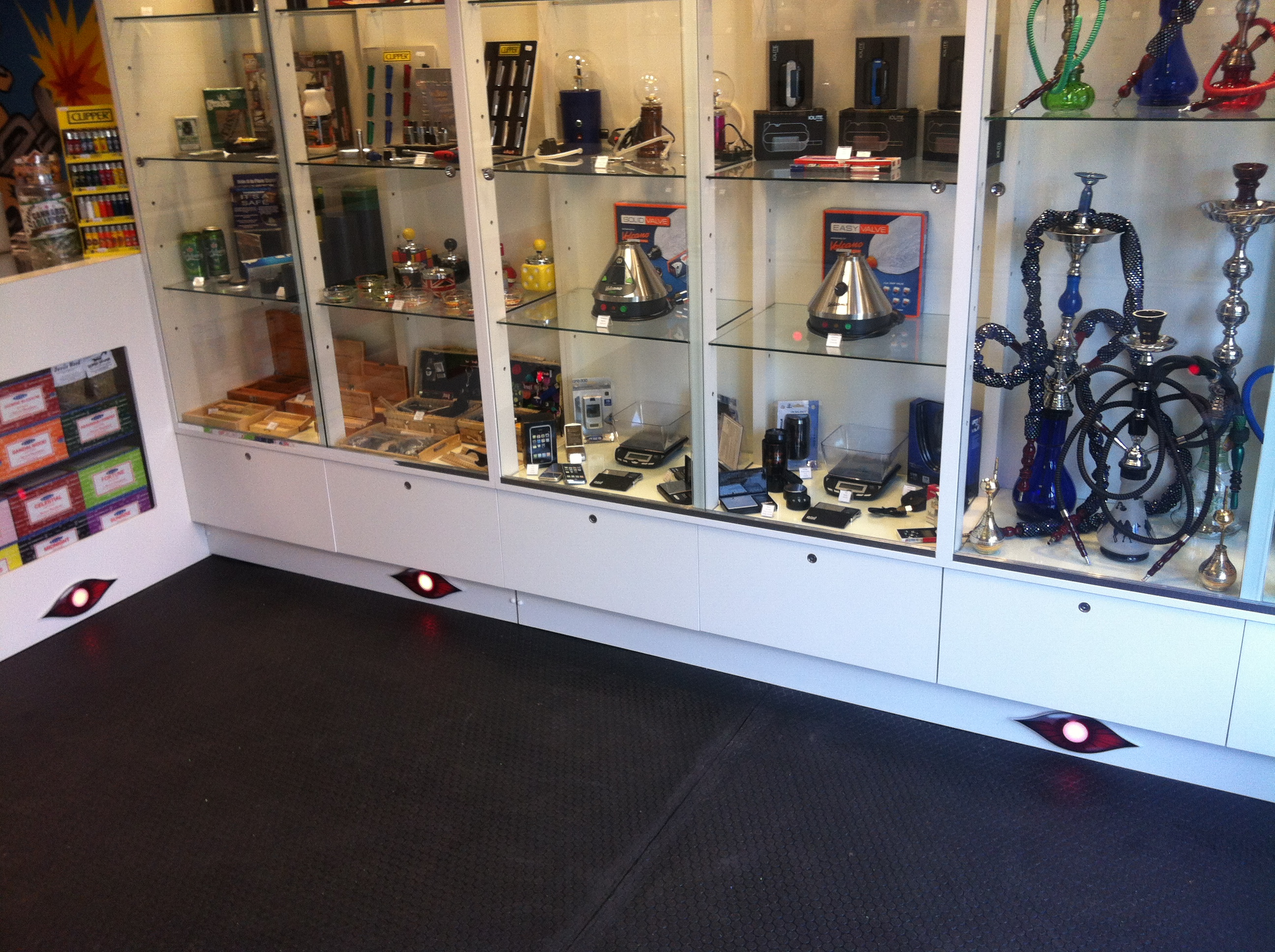
Bongs and pipes on display at a typical head shop

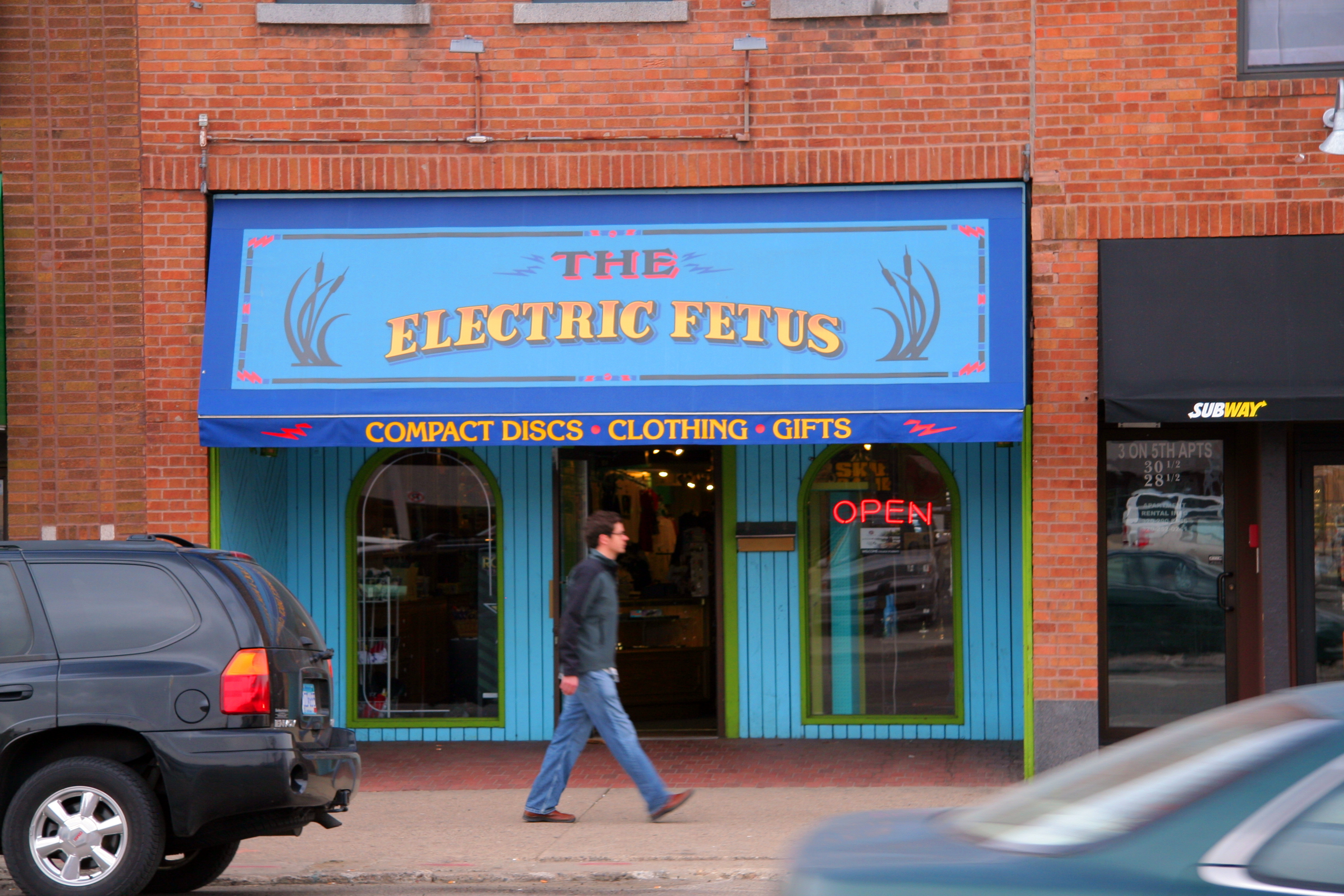
The "Electric Fetus" head shop in Saint Cloud, Minnesota (closed)

A head shop is a store that sells drug-related paraphernalia. Products sold may include hashish pipes, "one hitter" pipes; pipe screens; bongs (also referred to as water pipes); roach clips (used for smoking the end of a marijuana "joint"); vaporizers used for inhaling THC vapor from cannabis; rolling papers; rolling machines; small weighing scales; magazines about cannabis culture, cannabis cultivation, tattooing, and music; and items used for home cultivation of marijuana plants.

Head shops emerged from the hippie counterculture in the late 1960s. At that time, many of them had close ties to the anti-Vietnam War movement as well as groups in the marijuana legalization movement like LeMar, Amorphia, and the National Organization for the Reform of Marijuana Laws.

== Products ==
Products sold may include magazines (e.g., about cannabis culture, cannabis cultivation, tattooing, and music), clothing, and home décor (e.g., posters and wall hangings illustrating drug culture themes such as cannabis, jam bands like The Grateful Dead and Phish, psychedelic art, etc.). Some head shops also sell oddities, such as antique walking sticks and sex toys.

Since the 1980s, some head shops have sold clothing related to the heavy metal or punk subculture, such as band T-shirts and cloth patches with band logos, studded wristbands, bullet belts, and leather boots. Other items offered typically include hashish pipes, "one hitter" pipes; pipe screens; bongs (also referred to as water pipes); roach clips (used for smoking the end of a marijuana "joint"); vaporizers used for inhaling THC vapor from cannabis.

Products include rolling papers; rolling machines; small weighing scales; small ziplock baggies; cannabis grinders (i.e. herb grinders); blacklight-responsive posters and blacklights; incense; cigarette lighters; "stashes", which include a range of standard consumer products such as clocks, books, tins of cleaning powder, and toilet brushes which have hidden compartments for cannabis and non-camouflaged "stash boxes" which are tins or wooden containers for storing marijuana.

Some sell legal highs such as whipped-cream chargers (which contain nitrous oxide) and Salvia divinorum (both of which are illegal in some countries and some US states for recreational purposes). Some head shops also sell items used for home cultivation of marijuana plants, such as hydroponic equipment and lights and guidebooks on cultivation. Since the 2000s, some head shops also sell e-cigarettes and the flavoured liquids used with these devices.

== History ==
American head shops originated in the 1960s in cities with high concentrations of college-age youth, often growing out of independently owned poster or candle stores. Historically, U.S. head shops proliferated on St. Mark's Place in New York City's East Village, in West Los Angeles, in San Francisco's Haight-Ashbury neighborhood, and in Chicago's Old Town.

Sources cite the Psychedelic Shop on Haight Street in San Francisco as the first head shop in the United States. Operated by United States Army veteran Ron Thelin and his younger brother Jay, it opened on January 3, 1966. Four months later, Jeff Glick opened "Head Shop" on East Ninth Street in New York City. Also in 1966, The Birmingham Balloon Company opened at 113 Fry Street in Denton, Texas.

From 1968 to c. 1975, head shops served as an important outlet for underground newspapers and the underground comix of Robert Crumb and other counterculture cartoonists, which had little access to the established channels of newsstand distribution.

The shops' popularity eventually waned with the aging of that era's baby boomer generation, as well as a 1973 U.S. Supreme Court ruling, Miller v. California, that found that local communities could decide their own First Amendment standards concerning obscenity. In the mid-1970s, the sale of drug paraphernalia was outlawed in many places, and the distribution network for underground comics and newspapers dried up. In addition, the retail mainstream discovered and co-opted aspects of the head shop's market niche, such as psychedelic music and eco-friendly products.

In Berkeley, California, Annapurna was the city's sole head shop from 1980 to 1992 and one of only a small number that remained open in Northern California. The store, which opened in 1972, closed in 2025 after 53 years in business.

== Legality ==
=== Ireland ===
Head shops exist and are legal in Ireland, and were reported by authorities to be opening at a rate of one per week in January 2010. The legality of the shops was discussed in the Seanad Éireann, and a motion was passed requesting the Government to regulate the sale of products. Some politicians were in favour of outlawing the shops whereas others argued that prohibiting the purchases of legal intoxicants would be a "huge mistake" which would allow illegal street dealers to thrive.

During early 2010, a number of incidents of firebombing and arson against head shops took place around the country. Some attacks were traced to disgruntled drug dealers. One petrol bomb attack occurred in the home county of the Minister for Justice and Law Reform, Dermot Ahern, and hours later, plans for legislation for regulation of head shops got underway.

Many head shop products became illegal in Ireland on 23 August 2010 when the Criminal Justice (Psychoactive Substances) Act 2010 became law. The Act empowered Gardaí (Irish police) to seek court orders to close head shops suspected of selling drug-like products, with the onus on the owners to prove they are not doing so.

=== United States ===
In the United States, head shops are legal so long as they only sell items used for legal substances. Shops typically place signs stating that the products sold are "for tobacco use only" or "not for use with illegal substances". In many head shops, a sign will be posted (and often reiterated verbally) stating that customer references regarding the use of the shop's products for illegal drug use will result in the suspension of all sales for that time period, and/or removal of the customer from the shop. In some shops, simply saying the word "bong" is grounds for removal from the shop.

Head shops have been targeted by the Drug Enforcement Administration. In 2003, The U.S. Department of Justice indicted fifty-five people on charges of selling drug paraphernalia in Idaho, Texas, Iowa, Pennsylvania, Florida and Ohio as part of Operation Headhunter and Operation Pipe Dreams, including comedian Tommy Chong. During the investigation, government officials also targeted customers of the shops, arresting those who were in possession of drugs like cannabis and heroin. Chong was caught by sending shipments through the mail.

The legality of cannabis varies widely in the United States, but in states where medical cannabis is legal, cannabis dispensaries often double as head shops.

Notably, in the state of Florida, items "designed for use in ingesting, inhaling, or otherwise introducing cannabis, cocaine, hashish, hashish oil, or nitrous oxide into the human body" are illegal. At the same time, "pipes primarily made of briar, meerschaum, clay, or corn cob" are legal.

== Smart shops ==
Smart shops are shops (prominently found in the Netherlands, where the sale of marijuana is effectively legal) that sell psychoactive substances and various smokable herbs in addition to the drug paraphernalia found in head shops.

== See also ==
- Alternative culture
- Cannabis smoking
- Grow shop
- One hitter (smoking)
- Underground comix
- Underground press
- Gravity bong
- Tobacconist
- Cannabis shop
