= Waterpipe =

Waterpipe or water pipe may refer to:

- Water pipe, a pipe to feed water
- Hookah, a smoking device
- Bong, a smoking device
