= Smoke shop =

Smoke shop may refer to:

- Head shop, store that sells drug-related paraphernalia
- Tobacconist, retailer of tobacco and other products

== See also ==
- Smokehouse, building where meat or fish is cured with smoke
