= Hot knife =

Hot knife may refer to:

- A form of soldering iron equipped with a double-edged blade that is situated on a heating element
- Hot knife (smoking), a method of smoking cannabis
- "Hot Knife", a song by Fiona Apple from her 2012 album The Idler Wheel...

== See also ==
- "Hot Knives", a 2007 song by Bright Eyes
