= Sploof =

Handheld smoke filter

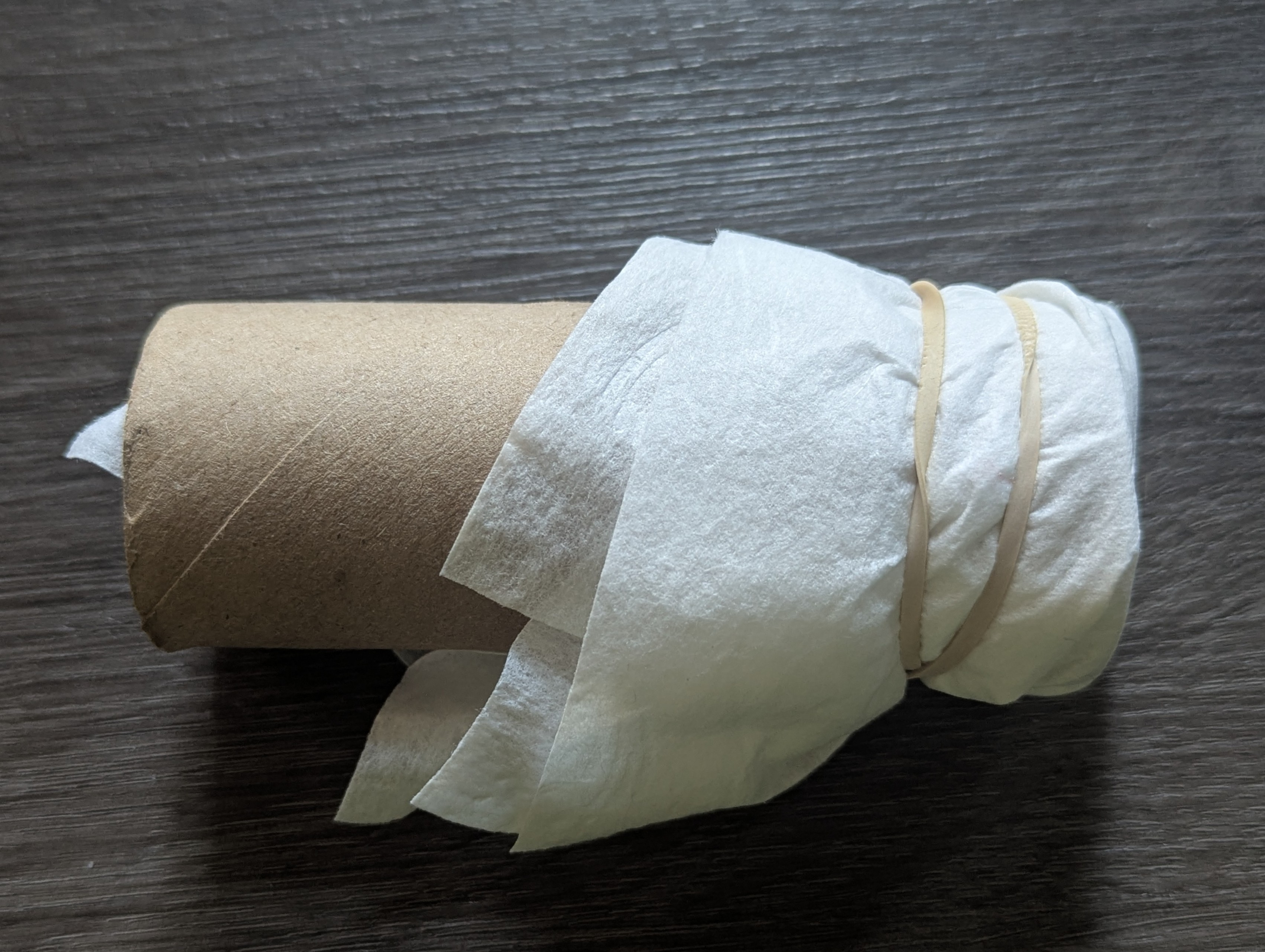
Sploof made from a cardboard toilet paper tube and multiple dryer sheets

A sploof is a type of handheld filter used for mitigating the smell of exhaled marijuana smoke. They are typically handmade and improvised. One common configuration is a toilet paper tube stuffed with deodorizing dryer sheets, through which the user exhales smoke. They are a fixture of stoner culture.

== Purpose ==
Cannabis smoking creates a distinct, lingering scent. This makes the activity easily detectable. Due to local laws or social norms, concealing the smell of marijuana smoke may be desirable. This is especially true when users smoke indoors or wish to remain inconspicuous in non-smoking spaces.

Even in localities where marijuana consumption is legal, the pungent odor may be considered a nuisance in certain situations. Sploofs are commonly employed by smokers in shared living spaces such as dorm rooms or apartment complexes.

== Types and usage ==
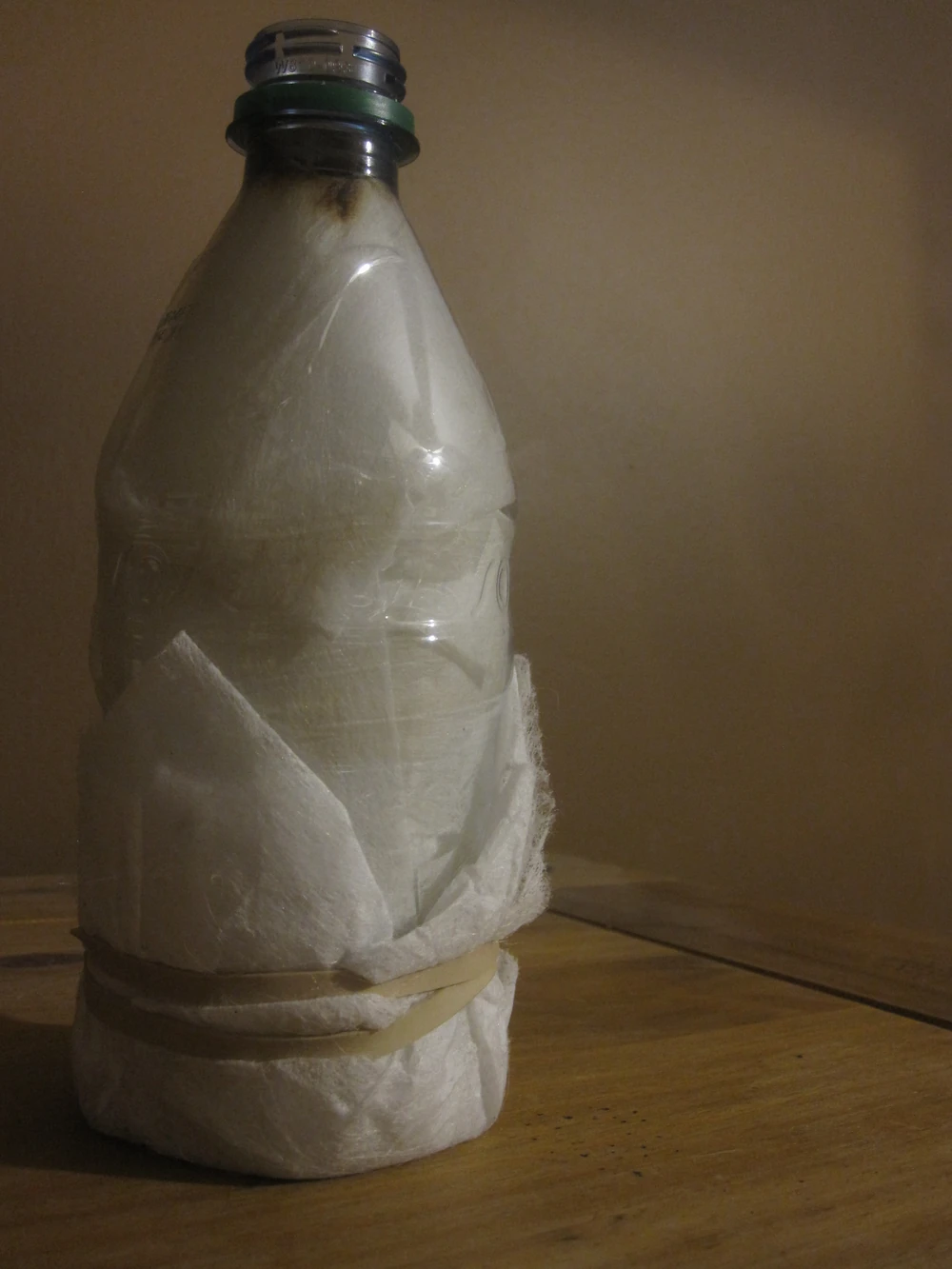
A sploof, constructed from a water bottle, dryer sheets, and rubber bands. The residue near the top is indication of prior use.

The most common type of sploof is an improvised device composed of multiple scented dryer sheets placed within a cardboard toilet paper tube. However, different configurations and materials may be used. Other cardboard tubes, such as those found inside paper towel rolls, are common. Plastic bottles can be used in lieu of a cardboard tube. Alternative stuffing materials may include fabric soaked in deodorizing sprays such as Febreze. A sock may be fitted around the device for an added layer of filtration.

Commercial handheld smoke filters have also gained popularity. These may be more efficient at filtering smoke than DIY options. Some include replaceable HEPA-grade filters, and are marketed to remove up to 99% of exhaled smoke.

To work, the user intentionally inhales smoke and holds their breath. Then, they place the tube around their mouth. The user then expels the smoke out of their mouth, blowing it into the tube and through the filtering fabric.

== Efficacy ==
Dryer sheets, typically made of polyester or fabric, are coated in hydrophobic substances and are positively charged. Marijuana smoke comprises oil-based cannabinoids, which are captured by the fibers of the dryer sheet and neutralized by the hydrophobic agents. The smell of any remaining smoke may be masked by the artificial scent of the dryer sheet.
