= Cannabis smoking =

Inhalation of cannabis fumes

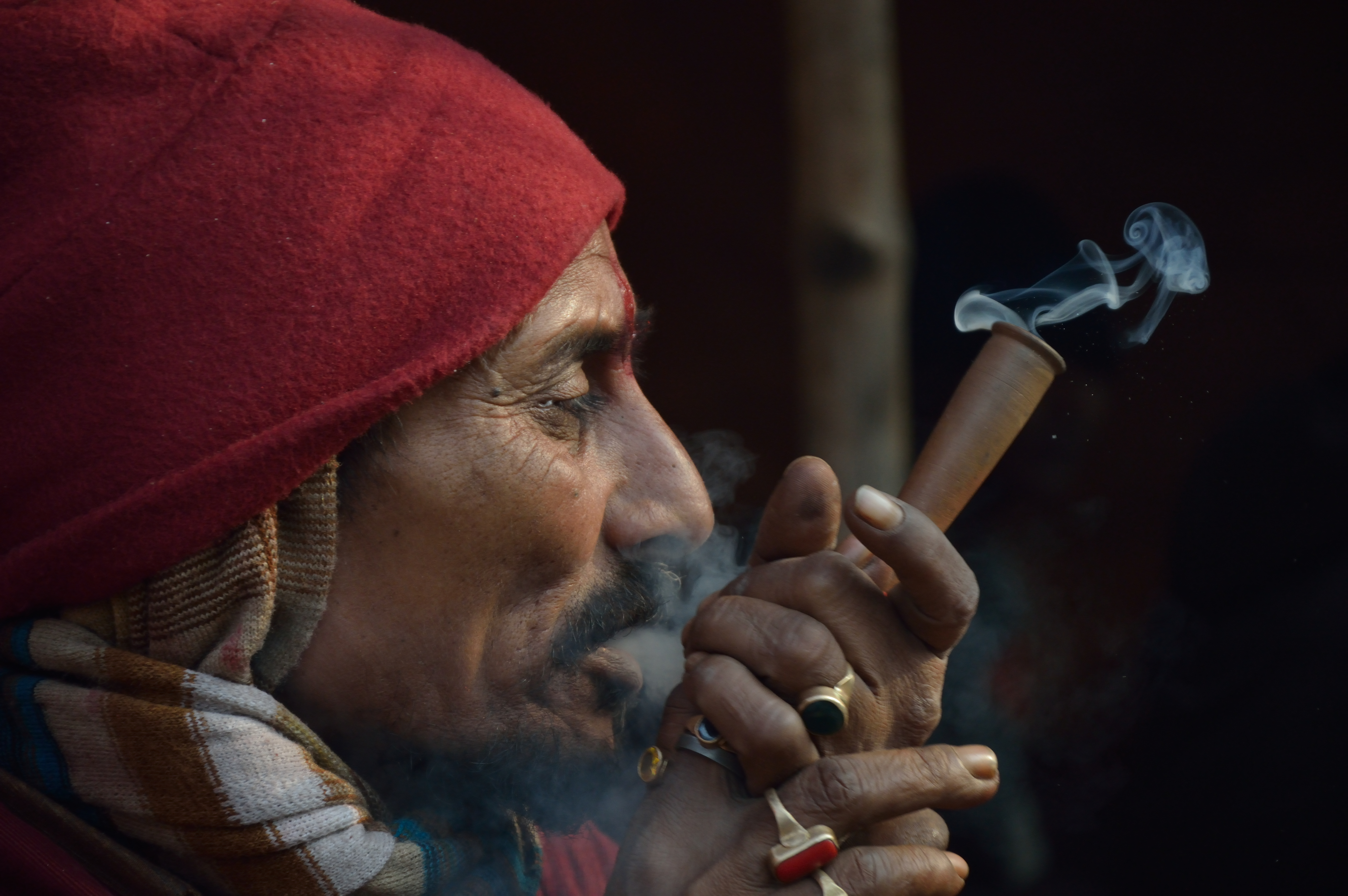
A man smoking cannabis through a Chillum in Kolkata, India in 2013

Cannabis smoking (known colloquially as smoking weed or smoking pot) is the inhalation of smoke or vapor released by heating the flowers, leaves, or extracts of cannabis and releasing the main psychoactive chemical, Δ^{9}-tetrahydrocannabinol (THC), which is absorbed into the bloodstream via the lungs. Archaeological evidence indicates cannabis with high levels of THC was smoked at least 2,500 years ago. As of 2021, cannabis is the most commonly consumed federally illegal drug in the United States, with 36.4 million people (aged 10 years or older) consuming it on a monthly basis. Smoking cannabis has been shown to be harmful to the health of the smoker, and may also be harmful to others through passive smoking.

In addition to being smoked and vaporized, cannabis and its active cannabinoids may be ingested, placed under the tongue, or applied to the skin. The bioavailability characteristics and effects of smoking and vaporizing cannabis differ from other cannabis consumption methods in having a more rapid and predictable onset of effect.

== Methods ==
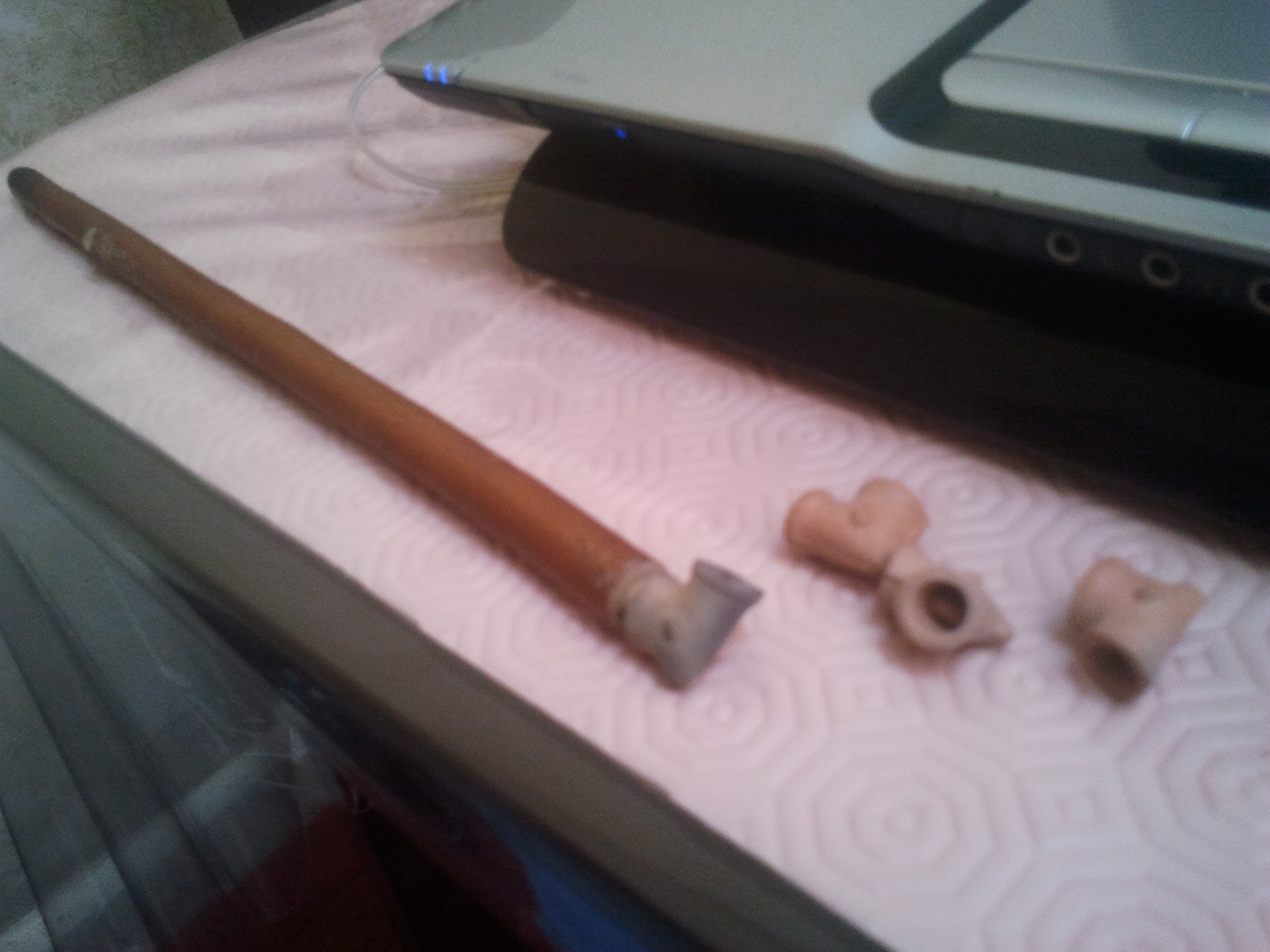
Sebsi

Cannabis can be smoked in a variety of pipe-like devices. The Moroccan longdraw tube sebsi is a "one-hitter". Cannabis pipes are made from a variety of materials and come in many different shapes and sizes, including hand pipes ("bowls"), water pipes ("bongs"), cigarettes ("joints"), or blunts.

Solar puffing (also called "solar toking", "taking solar hits”, or “solar bowls”) is the act of using the Sun's rays with a magnifying lens or burning glass to heat cannabis for consumption.

"Hotboxing" involves multiple persons smoking cannabis in an enclosed space, such as a car, with no way for the smoke to escape. In addition to the primary smoke from the chosen smoking devices, second hand smoke is repeatedly inhaled and exhaled. A single user breathing in and out of a breathbonnet (bread bag) can achieve this effect.

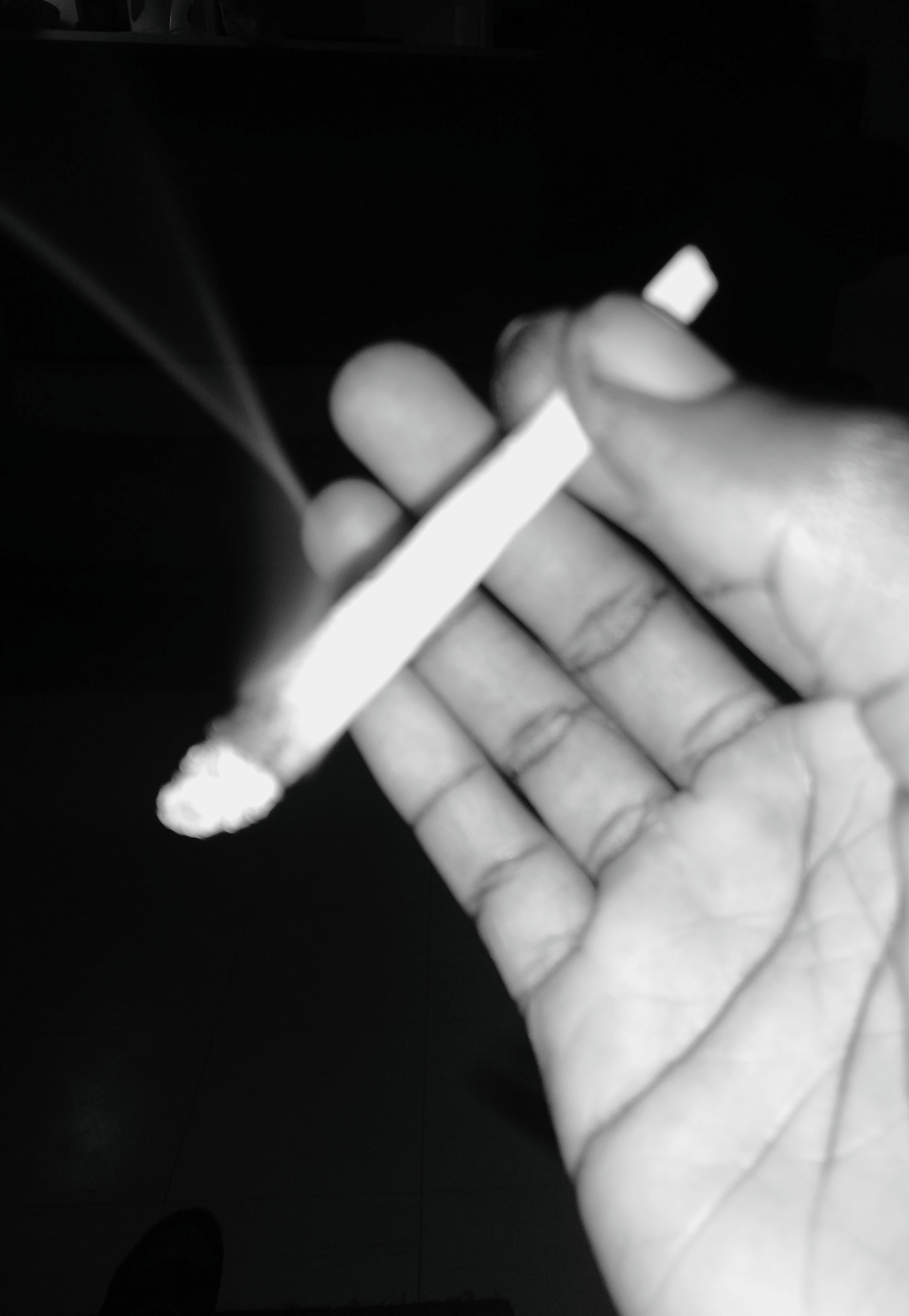
A joint that is being held

=== Vaporization ===
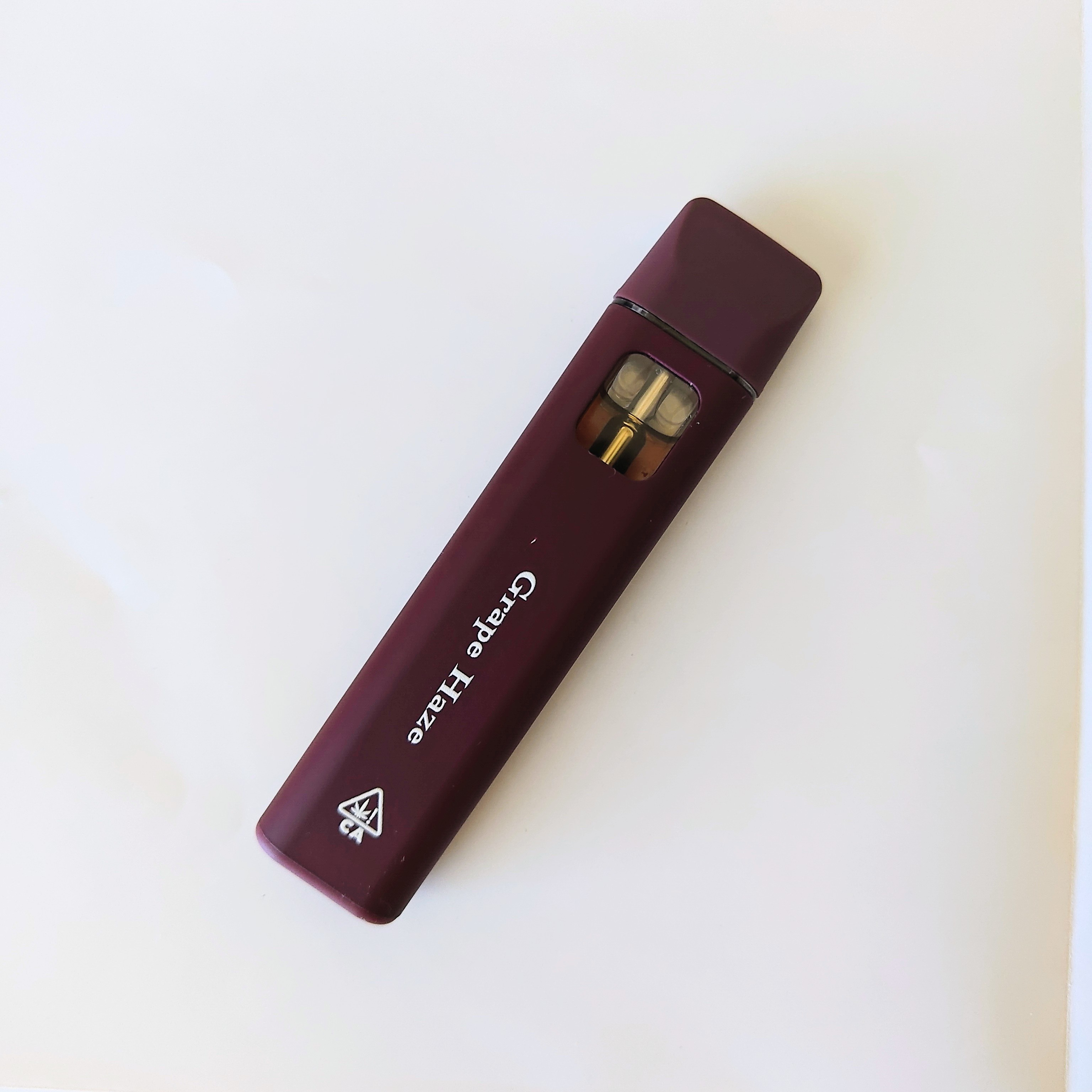
A disposable vaporizer from California

Vaporizers (vape pens or stationary platform) are devices used to extract the active ingredients of cannabis, tobacco (E-cigarettes), or any plant material at lower than burning temperature, eliminating carbon monoxide and carcinogenic "tars" found hazardous in smoke. 197 °C / 385 °F is frequently mentioned as a good vaporizing temperature for favored cannabinoids. Utensils usually thought of as smoking pipes can be used to vaporize if the receptacle, or "bowl", is narrow enough to permit controlling the inward flow of heated air from a source such as a lighter which is held far enough below the opening.

According to the journal Clinical Pharmacology & Therapeutics, vaporizing cannabis is a safe and more effective way (than smoking) of delivering THC to patients for medical uses. The feasibility of vaporization of THC has been demonstrated in a series of laboratory studies involving different vaporizer designs. An electric vaporizer was shown to release substantial amounts of the THC while producing no measurable amounts of benzene, toluene, and naphthalene, which are generated when marijuana is smoked.

=== Smoking ===
==== Health effects of smoking ====
Some data on the correlation of an increase in the incidence of lung cancer and cannabis smoking are conflicting. A systematic review evaluating 19 studies from 1966 to 2006 found no significant tobacco-adjusted association between cannabis smoking and lung cancer development despite evidence of precancerous histopathologic changes of the respiratory mucosa.

Cannabis smoke was listed as a cancer agent in California in 2009. Cannabis smoke contains many of the same carcinogens as tar from tobacco smoke.

A 2012 literature survey by the British Lung Foundation identified cannabis smoke as a carcinogen and also found awareness of the danger was low, with 40% of under 35s thinking that cannabis (when smoked) was not harmful. Other observations include lack of research on the effect of cannabis smoke alone due to common mixing of cannabis and tobacco and frequent cigarette smoking by cannabis users; low rate of addiction compared to tobacco; and episodic nature of cannabis use compared to steady frequent smoking of tobacco.

A 2013 literature review said that exposure to cannabis had biologically based physical, mental, behavioral and social health consequences and was "associated with diseases of the liver (particularly with co-existing hepatitis C), lungs, heart, and vasculature". The authors cautioned that "evidence is needed, and further research should be considered, to prove causal associations of marijuana with many physical health conditions".

== Materials ==
=== Disposable materials ===
Disposable materials are often used in places where cannabis is illegal.

A roach is the remains of a joint, blunt or roll up cigarette after most of it has been smoked.

==== Joint ====
Joint is a slang term for a cigarette filled with cannabis instead of tobacco. Alternatively, mainly in Europe, joints may contain tobacco (commonly dubbed "a spliff", but not to be confused with the Jamaican term Spliff, which refers to a large joint) or various non-addictive herbs. Sometimes a joint will contain kief or hashish; hashish can be heated and made to crumble before placement within the joint. Specially manufactured rolling papers are most often used in industrialized countries; however, recycled brown paper and newspaper are commonly used in the developing world. Modern papers are now made from a wide variety of materials including rice, hemp, soy, and flax. A joint typically contains 0.8 - 1g net weight of cannabis or fillers.

==== Blunt ====
A blunt is cannabis rolled with a cigar wrapper (usually tobacco leaf, which contains nicotine). Blunts are often made with blunt wraps: tobacco-based wraps — often flavored — that are related to the wraps used on a blunt cigar and are often used to roll cannabis Blunts can also now be rolled with hemp wraps that do not contain nicotine. There are several types available in varying flavors as an alternative to using a cigar wrapper, for those people who don't desire the nicotine.

=== Reusable materials ===
==== Pipe or bowl ====
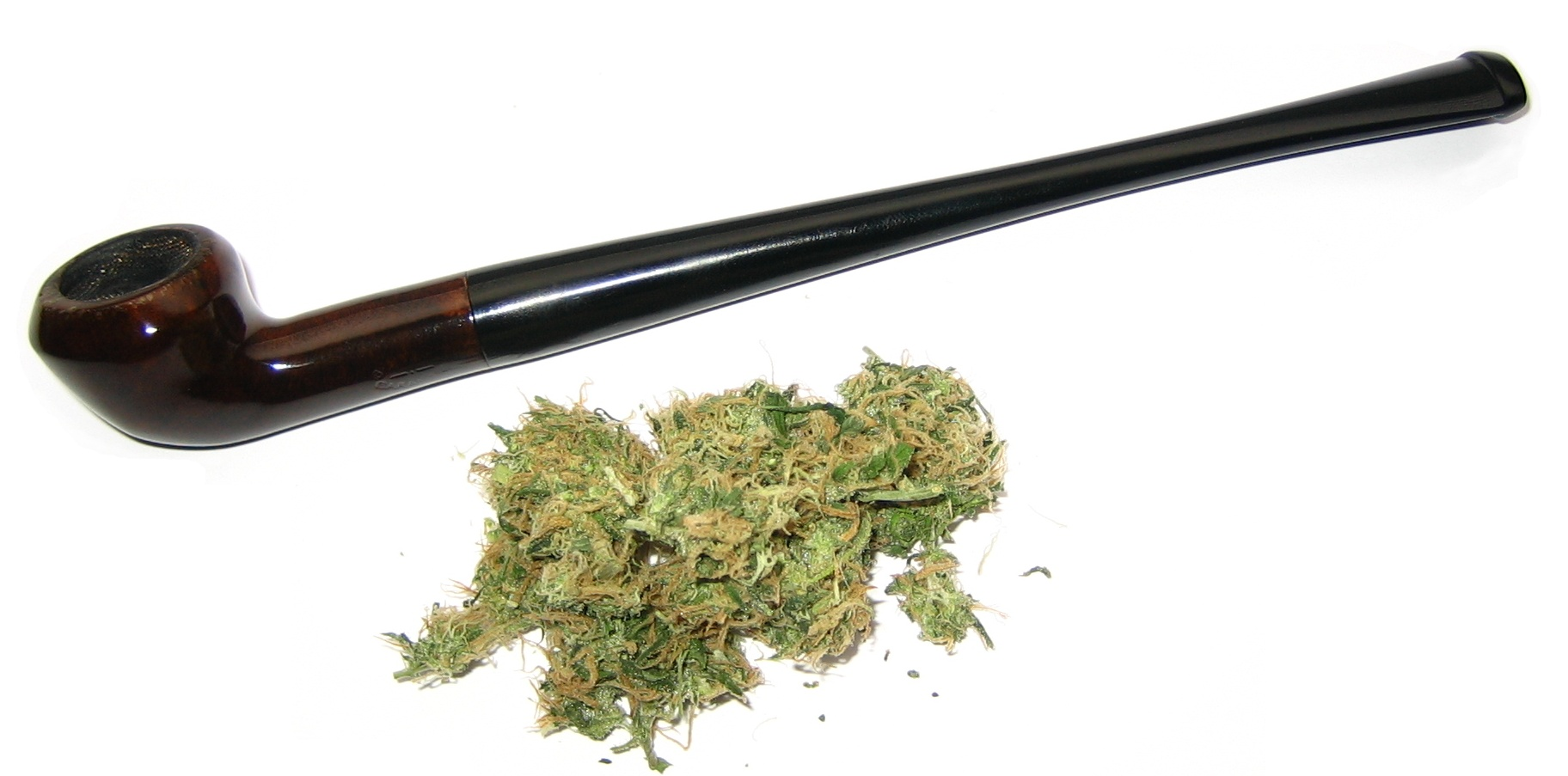

Pipes made for smoking cannabis, sometimes called pieces or bowls, are made of a variety of materials, including metal fittings, ceramic, borosilicate glass, stone, wood, bamboo among other materials. Subtypes include one-hitters, bubblers, chillums, glass blunts, corn cob pipes, and standard hand pipes. Pipes vary greatly in shape and materials, and most are handmade. The common thread between them is having a narrow screened receptacle ("bowl"), a "stem" (which may be a long flexible tube as on hookahs and vaporizers), and a "mouthpiece". The smoking material is placed in the receptacle and affected with a heat source while air is drawn through the bowl and stem to the user.

Blown-glass pipes and bongs are often intricately and colorfully designed. In India and Jamaica, the most commonly used pipe is the chillum.; in the UAE, midwakh; in Morocco, sebsi.

- A one-hitter is a device used for a single serving (usually 25 mg).
- Chalice is a cannabis smoking pipe used most often by members of the Jamaican Rastafari movement.

==== Bubbler ====
A bubbler is a mix of a bong and a pipe. They tend to look like small bongs and are another way to smoke cannabis. A bubbler contains a chamber for water, commonly with a down stem directly connected to the bowl of the piece. A bubbler normally has a dedicated carburetor, a hole which is usually covered with the finger then opened for mixing clean air with the smoke to make inhaling easier. Because of the carburetor there is no need to pull the stem as you would with a bong.

==== Bong ====
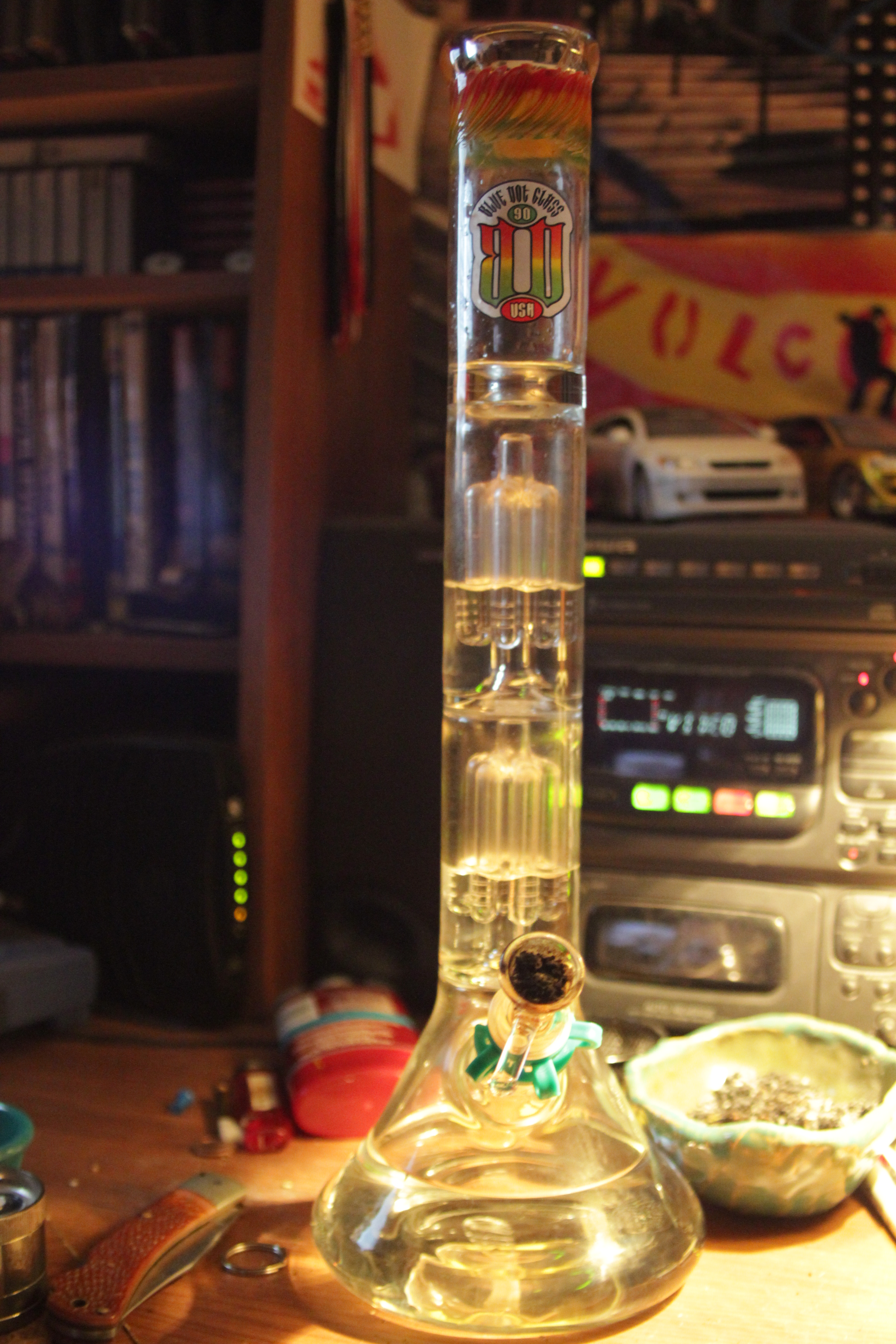
A glass bong filled with water and its bowl packed with cannabis

A man demonstrates how to use a bong to inhale smoke.

A bong is similar to a pipe, only it has a water-chamber through which cannabis smoke passes prior to inhalation. Users fill the bong with water, sometimes also adding ice in order to cool the smoke. This cooling effect reduces the discomfort caused by the heat of the smoke. The bowl and stem assembly of most bongs is removed briefly after the cannabis is burned, allowing clean air to circulate and clear the smoke chamber, ensuring no smoke dissipates without being properly consumed.

Types of bongs:

- Classical bongs.
- Gravity bong (also known as a grav, bucket, bucky (in New Zealand), submarine, geeb, or GB) is a hydropneumatic device used for smoking cannabis. A typical variant consists of a bucket of water in which is typically placed a bottle with the bottom cut off, such as a 2-litre PET soft drink bottle. However, commercial gravity bongs made of borosilicate glass exist too. Some kind of cap or screen is rigged over the mouth of the bottle and filled with hash or cannabis. A flame is then held near enough to heat the drug while the bottle is slowly raised out of the water, creating a negative gauge pressure inside the bottle, drawing smoke from the heated cannabis—along with air—into the vacuum. The cap or screen is removed once the bottle is almost full, the user's mouth is placed over the mouth of the bottle and the bottle pushed back down into the water, causing the pressure to rise and forcing the smoke into the lungs. There are many variants on this basic premise, such as using a large water cooler tank in lieu of a soft drink bottle.
- Waterfall bong: Similar to a gravity bong, a waterfall bong utilizes both a bottle and a cap or screen rigged over the bottle's mouth to hold cannabis. In this case, however, the bottle—which has one or several holes drilled near or at the bottom—is either filled with water or placed in a larger container filled with water before the cannabis is packed. The holes are then uncovered, or the bottle is simply raised from the container, evacuating the water either onto the ground or back into the container. When heat is applied to the drug, the resultant smoke is forced into the bottle with negative gauge pressure, as with the gravity bong. Once the water is evacuated, the smoke can be inhaled from the bottle. Variations on this concept are also used. Commercial gravity bongs made of borosilicate glass exist too.

==== Spots ====
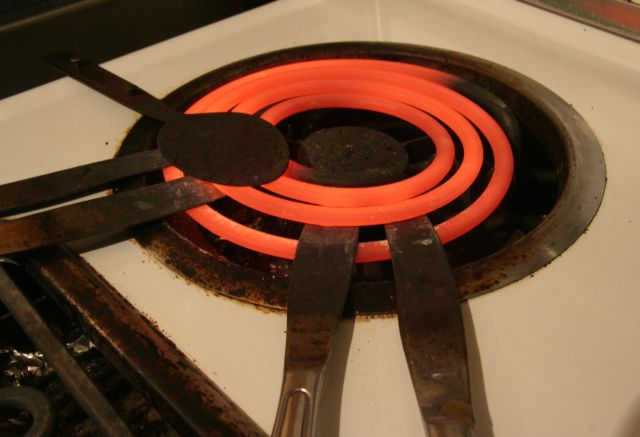
Spotting knives heating

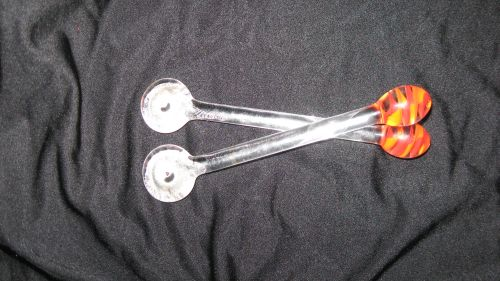
Glass blades

Spotting refers to a method of smoking cannabis. In this method, small pieces of cannabis are rolled (or simply torn from a larger bud) to form the "spot". Generally, the tips of two knife blades are heated, the spot is compressed between the two blades, and the subsequent smoke is inhaled through the nose or mouth. This method of smoking is also referred to as "hot knives" because of the heated blades. Another means is specially made glass presses heated with a propane or butane torch. In order to facilitate this process, a "spottle" (also referred to as a "bowser", "hooter" or "toker") is often, but not always, used to funnel the smoke and maximize the amount inhaled. A spottle is generally made from a funnel or cone-shaped container, such as the top (or neck) of a plastic or glass bottle or a gallon of milk/water.

== See also ==
- Cannabis consumption
- Electronic cigarette
- Hashish
- Sploof
- Tobacco smoking
- Legality of cannabis
