= Spots (cannabis) =

Method of smoking marijuana

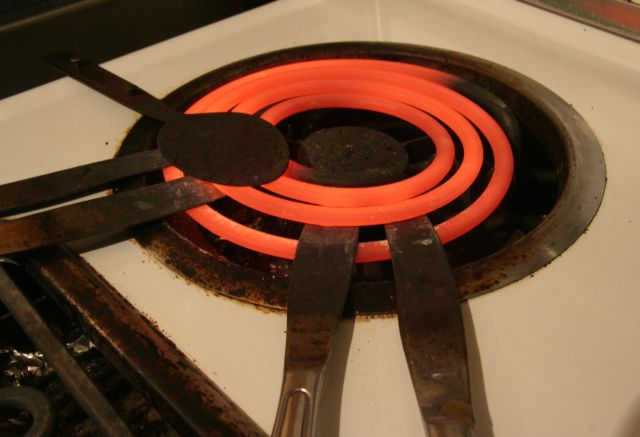
Spotting knives heating

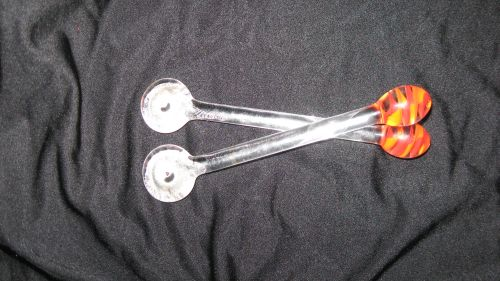
Glass blades

Spots (also known as Blades, spotting, knifers, knife hits, knife tokes, dots, hot knives, kitchen tracking blades, or bladers) refers to a method of smoking cannabis. Small pieces of cannabis are rolled (or simply torn from a larger bud) to form the spot.

The practice originated in the 1970s when drops or dabs of hashish oil were smoked (three dabs of hash oil were considered to be a good standard dose). Generally, the tips of two knife blades are heated, the spot or drop of hash oil is compressed between the two blades, and the subsequent smoke is inhaled through the nose or mouth.

Another means that is gaining popularity is specially made glass presses heated with a propane or butane torch. In order to facilitate this process, a spottle (also referred to as a bowser, hooter or toker) or hitter is often, but not always, used to funnel the smoke and maximize the amount inhaled. A spottle is generally made from a funnel or cone-shaped container, such as the top (or neck) of a plastic or glass bottle or a gallon of milk/water.

== Use in different countries ==
Although practiced over the world, the spots method of cannabis smoking is most common in New Zealand. Possession of knives that have been previously used for spotting (easily distinguished by their blackened and discoloured appearance) is considered "possession of paraphernalia" and is thus illegal under New Zealand law. If convicted, the accused faces a possible maximum 1-year prison sentence and/or a $500 fine. In 2008, six New Zealand soldiers were "sent home in disgrace" from their posting in Afghanistan after it was discovered they were spotting hashish. In the United Kingdom, this method of smoking is relatively rare, and appears to be getting rarer. One 1998 survey of regular UK cannabis users put usage of the "hot knives" technique at only 1.3%, down from 5.2% in 1984.

== Health risks ==
Users spotting cannabis are susceptible to greater health risks than other methods of smoking cannabis. Spotting cannabis oil or resin is thought to be particularly harmful to the lungs, as the smoke comes off the oil at such a high temperature. One possible way of minimizing the risks of spotting marijuana is using cooler knives, leading to the tetrahydrocannabinol (THC) being vaporised rather than the entire plant matter being burnt. Some users also fill the lower half of the spottle with ice (that stays in place by being frozen to the edges of the spottle), but much more common is to just freeze the bottle, which leads to a cooler smoke that is less harsh on the lungs.

Care must be taken not to touch the side of a plastic spottle with a hot knife when inhaling spots, as burning plastic gives off many toxic chemicals, including (in the case of polyvinyl chloride (PVC) plastics) dioxin, a carcinogen. For this reason, many smokers prefer to use a glass bottle.

A 1998 joint submission by the Royal Society and the Academy of Medical Science on the recreational and medical use of marijuana expressed concern about the use and dissemination of the "hot knives" technique. The submission speculated that increasing use of methods of smoking that enable massive inhalation (and therefore higher intake of cannabinoids) may lead to an increase in incidents of short-term cannabis-related mental disturbance.

== Other purposes ==
The same general procedure is also used with opium, morphine base paste, and black-tar heroin.
