= Operation Pipe Dreams =

2003 American drug enforcement operation

- Operation name: Operation Pipe Dreams
- Type: Drug Paraphernalia Trafficking Enforcement
- Scope: National

Participants
- Executed by: U.S. Drug Enforcement Administration (DEA)
- Countries participating: United States

Mission
- Objective: To dismantle the illegal drug paraphernalia industry

Timeline
- Date executed: 2003

Results
- Suspects: 55
- Indictments: 35

Expenditure
- Total public expenditure: $12 million

Operation Pipe Dreams was an American nationwide investigation in 2003 targeting businesses selling drug paraphernalia, mostly marijuana pipes and bongs, under a little-used statute. Due to the reluctance of state law-enforcement agencies to contribute resources to the operation, most cases were filed in Iowa and Pennsylvania, taking advantage of the statute's prohibition on the use of "the mails or any other facility of interstate commerce to transport drug paraphernalia."

Hundreds of businesses and homes were raided as a result of Operation Pipe Dreams. Fifty-five people were named in indictments and charged with trafficking of illegal drug paraphernalia. While 54 of the 55 individuals charged were sentenced to fines and home detentions, actor Tommy Chong was sentenced September 11, 2003, to 9 months in a federal prison, a fine of $20,000, forfeiture of $103,000 in assets, and a year of probation. Chong was charged for his part in financing and promoting Chong Glass Works/Nice Dreams, California-based companies started by his son Paris. Unlike most shops selling bongs, Nice Dreams specialized in selling high-end bongs as collectible works of art. The Chong Glass Works employed 25 glass blowers who were paid an hourly wage of $30 (equivalent to $53 in 2025) to produce 100 pipes a day.

Nice Dreams had a policy in place for refusing to sell bongs to states where the statute was being enforced. Federal agents, disguised as head-shop owners, pressured Paris Chong to sell them his pipes and deliver them through the mail to a fictitious shop in the Pittsburgh suburb of Beaver Falls, Pennsylvania. When Paris persistently refused, agents went to the place of business in person and ordered a massive quantity of out of stock merchandise. The merchandise was crafted but not picked up and sat idle in the warehouse as federal agents again pressured Paris to ship it. To get the merchandise out of his warehouse, DEA agents became employees and shipped the merchandise. In a plea bargain, Chong agreed to plead guilty to one count of conspiracy to distribute drug paraphernalia in exchange for non-prosecution of his wife, Shelby, and his son, Paris. Federal Prosecution admitted to being harsher on Chong in retaliation, citing Chong's movies as trivializing "law enforcement efforts to combat drug trafficking and use."

The estimated cost of Operation Pipe Dreams was over $12 million and included the resources of 2,000 law enforcement officers. The DEA was supported by elements of the Marshals Service, Secret Service, Postal Inspection Service, and the Customs Service.

Speaking in 2013, former Law Enforcement Against Prohibition research specialist Sean Dunagan described the operation as a failure, saying "It was tremendous waste of money, a tremendous waste of resources that had no impact. It was blatantly targeted prosecution made for political purposes."
