= Bong =

Device used for smoking tobacco, cannabis, or other herbs

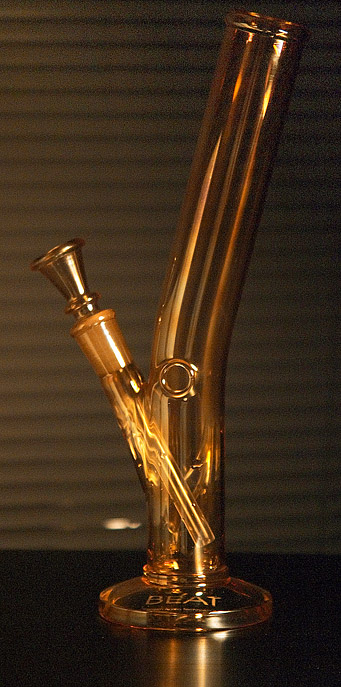
A bong with a circular carburetion port in the front of the bowl. The smoke flows from the lower port on the left to the upper port on the right.

A bong (also known as a water pipe) is a filtration device generally used for smoking cannabis, tobacco, or other herbal substances.

In construction and function, a bong is similar to a hookah, except smaller and especially more portable. A bong may be constructed from any air- and water-tight vessel by adding a bowl and stem apparatus (or slide) which guides air downward to below water level whence it bubbles upward ("bubbler") during use. To get fresh air into the bong and harvest the last remaining smoke, a hole known as the "carburetor", "carb", "choke", "bink", "rush", "shotty", "kick hole", or simply "hole", somewhere on the lower part of the bong above water level, is first kept covered during the smoking process, then opened to allow the smoke to be inhaled. On bongs without such a hole, the bowl and/or the stem are removed to allow air from the hole that holds the stem.

Bongs have been in use by the Hmong in Laos and Thailand, as well as all over Africa, for centuries. One of the earliest recorded uses of the word in the West is in the McFarland Thai-English Dictionary, published in 1944, which describes one of the meanings of bong in the Thai language as, "a bamboo waterpipe for smoking kancha, tree, hashish, or the hemp-plant". A January 1971 issue of the Marijuana Review also used the term.

== Etymology ==
The word bong is an adaptation of the Thai word bong or baung (Thai: บ้อง, [bɔ̂ŋ]), which refers to a cylindrical wooden tube, pipe, or container cut from bamboo, and which also refers to the bong used for smoking.

== History ==
Excavations of a kurgan in Russia in 2013 revealed that Scythian tribal chiefs used gold vessels 2400 years ago to smoke cannabis and opium. The kurgan was discovered when construction workers were clearing land for the construction of a power line.

During the reign of Mughal emperor Akbar, physician Hakim Abul Fath invented the waterpipe in India, and discovered tobacco. Abul suggested that tobacco "smoke should be first passed through a small receptacle of water so that it would be rendered harmless". Other sources also show evidence of the invention of the waterpipe in China during the late Ming dynasty (16th century), along with tobacco, through Persia and the Silk Road. By the Qing dynasty, it became the most popular method to smoke tobacco, but became less popular since the Republic era. While typically employed by commoners, the water pipe is known to have been preferred by Empress Dowager Cixi over snuff bottles or other methods of intake. According to the Imperial Household Department, she was buried with at least three water pipes; some of her collections can be seen in the Palace Museum.

The water pipe employed since the Qing dynasty can be divided into two types: the homemade bamboo bong commonly made and used by country people, and a more elegant metal version employed by Chinese merchants, urbanites, and nobility. Metal utensils are typically made out of bronze or brass, the nobility version of silver and decorated with jewels.

== Use ==
Diagram of a bong in operation

Sound of a bong in operation

The water can trap some heavier particles and water-soluble molecules, preventing them from entering the smoker's airways. The mechanics of a bong are compared to those of a laboratory gas washing bottle. The user puts their mouth at the top and places the cannabis in the tube, as shown in the picture.

Bongs are often either glass or plastic that use a bowl, stem, and water to produce smoke. Most glass bongs are made from heat resistant borosilicate glass, allowing the bong to withstand repeated use and heat exposure without breaking. After the bowl has been packed and water has been inserted into the bong, the substance is lit and the smoke is drawn through water to produce a smoother smoke than other methods of smoking do. To smoke a bong, the smoker must inhale in the bong so bubbles containing smoke begin to come from the stem. Once the bong has a fair amount of smoke built up, either the carb is uncovered or the stem is separated from the bong, allowing the remaining smoke to be inhaled.

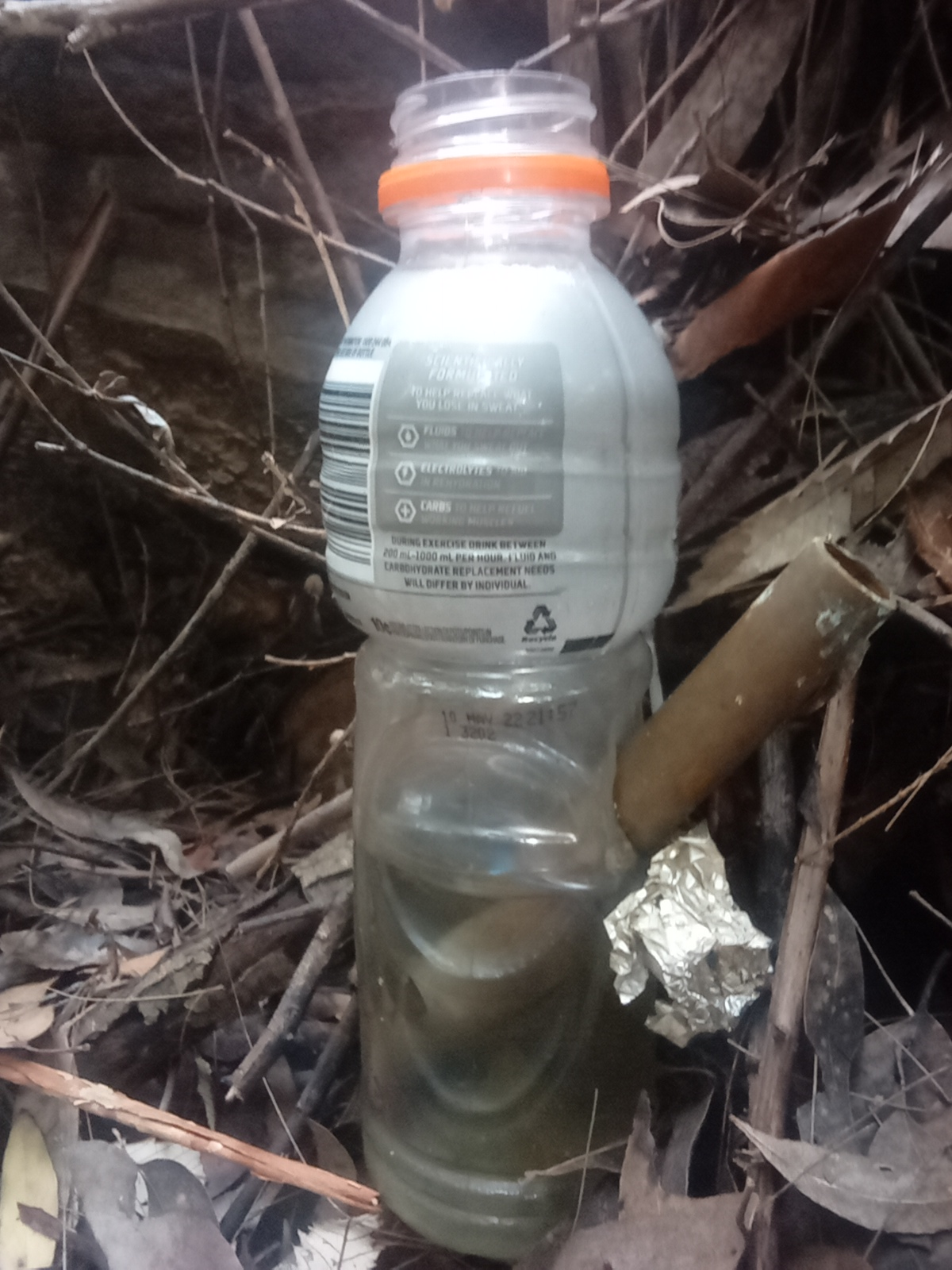
A bong made from a plastic bottle of Gatorade. Sydney, 2022

However, a 2000 NORML-MAPS cannabis study found that "water pipes filter out more psychoactive THC than they do other tars, thereby requiring users to smoke more to reach their desired effect". In the study, smoke from cannabis supplied by the NIDA was drawn through a number of smoking devices and analyzed. This study looked at the tar to cannabinoid ratio in the gas in output by various bongs, as well as unfiltered and filtered joints, and vaporizers. The results showed that only vaporizers produced a better tar to cannabinoid ratio than unfiltered joints, but that within the cannabinoids produced, even vaporizers warped the ratio of THC (the psychoactive component of the smoke) to CBN (capable of producing medical benefits but is not psychoactive) in favor of CBN. This showed an unfiltered joint had the best tar to THC ratio of all, and bongs were actually seriously detrimental in this respect.

MAPS also reviewed a study that examined the effects and composition of water-filtered and non-filtered cannabis and tobacco smoke. It found that when alveolar macrophages were exposed to unfiltered smoke, their ability to fight bacteria was reduced, unlike exposure to water-filtered smoke. It also found substantial epidemiological evidence of a lower incidence of carcinoma among tobacco smokers who used water-pipes, as opposed to cigarettes, cigars, and regular pipes. "It appears that water filtration can be effective in removing components from cannabis smoke that are known toxicants... The effectiveness of toxicant removal is related to the smoke's water contact area."

Specially designed water pipes, incorporating particulate filters and gas-dispersion frits, would likely be most effective in this regard; the gas-dispersion frit serves to break up the smoke into very fine bubbles, thereby increasing its water-contact area. These frits are commonly referred to as diffuser for the way that they diffuse (or disperse) the smoke as it exits the downstem, and usually consist of small holes or slats at the end of the downstem. This study suggests that a bong's smoke is less harmful than unfiltered smoke.

=== Adverse health effects ===
Bongs that are cleaned regularly eliminates yeast, fungi, bacteria and pathogens that can cause several symptoms that vary from allergy to lung infection.

==== Plastic bongs ====
A 2011 article in High Times suggested that it is possible to imagine that a process of chemicals leaching into water may occur with a plastic "... homemade water bottle bong where the bottle is routinely heated up." It also reported that "According to Cancer Research UK, plastic bottles heated up to 60°C contain unhealthy levels of toxic chemicals."

== Legal issues ==
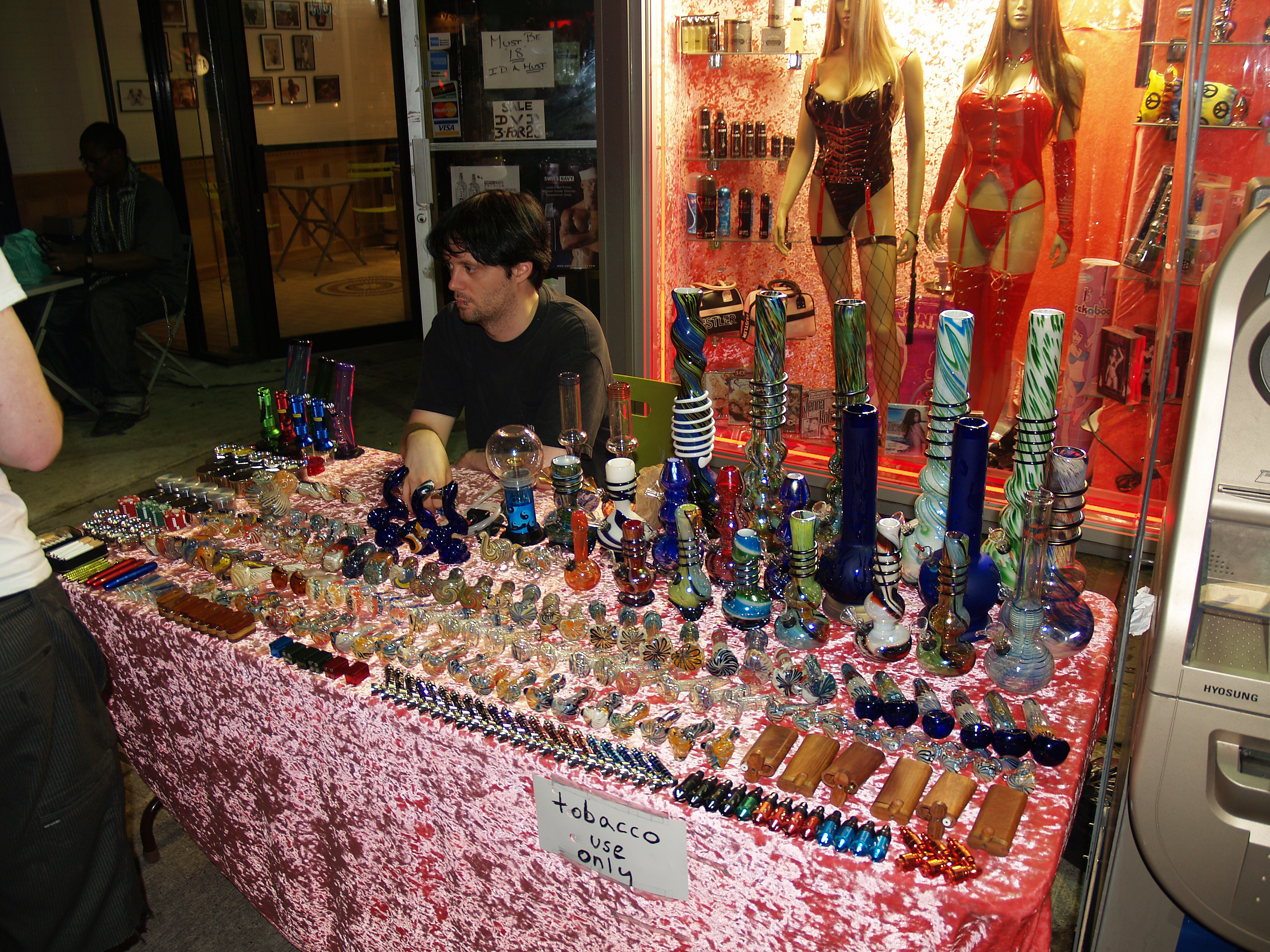
A variety of bongs for sale, among other merchandise in Manhattan. For legal reasons, the products are labeled as "Tobacco Use Only".

In the United States, under the Federal Drug Paraphernalia Statute, which is part of the Controlled Substances Act, it is illegal to sell, transport through the mail, transport across state lines, import, or export drug paraphernalia.

In countries where marijuana and hashish are illegal, some retailers specify that bongs are intended for use with tobacco in an attempt to circumvent laws against selling drug paraphernalia. While technically "bong" does not mean a device used for smoking mainly cannabis, drug-related connotations have been formed with the word itself (partly due to punning with Sanskrit bhangah "hemp"). Thus for fear of the law many head shops will not serve customers who use the word "bong" or "bongs", or any other word typically associated with illegal drug use.

Some brand name bong manufacturers (notably RooR) have sought to curb the counterfeit market for their products by suing stores accused of selling fake merchandise.

== See also ==
- Drug paraphernalia
- Hookah
- One-hitter (smoking)
- Gravity bong
- Operation Pipe Dreams
- Thuoc lao
- Vaporizer (inhalation device)
