= Drug paraphernalia =

Items associated with recreational drug use

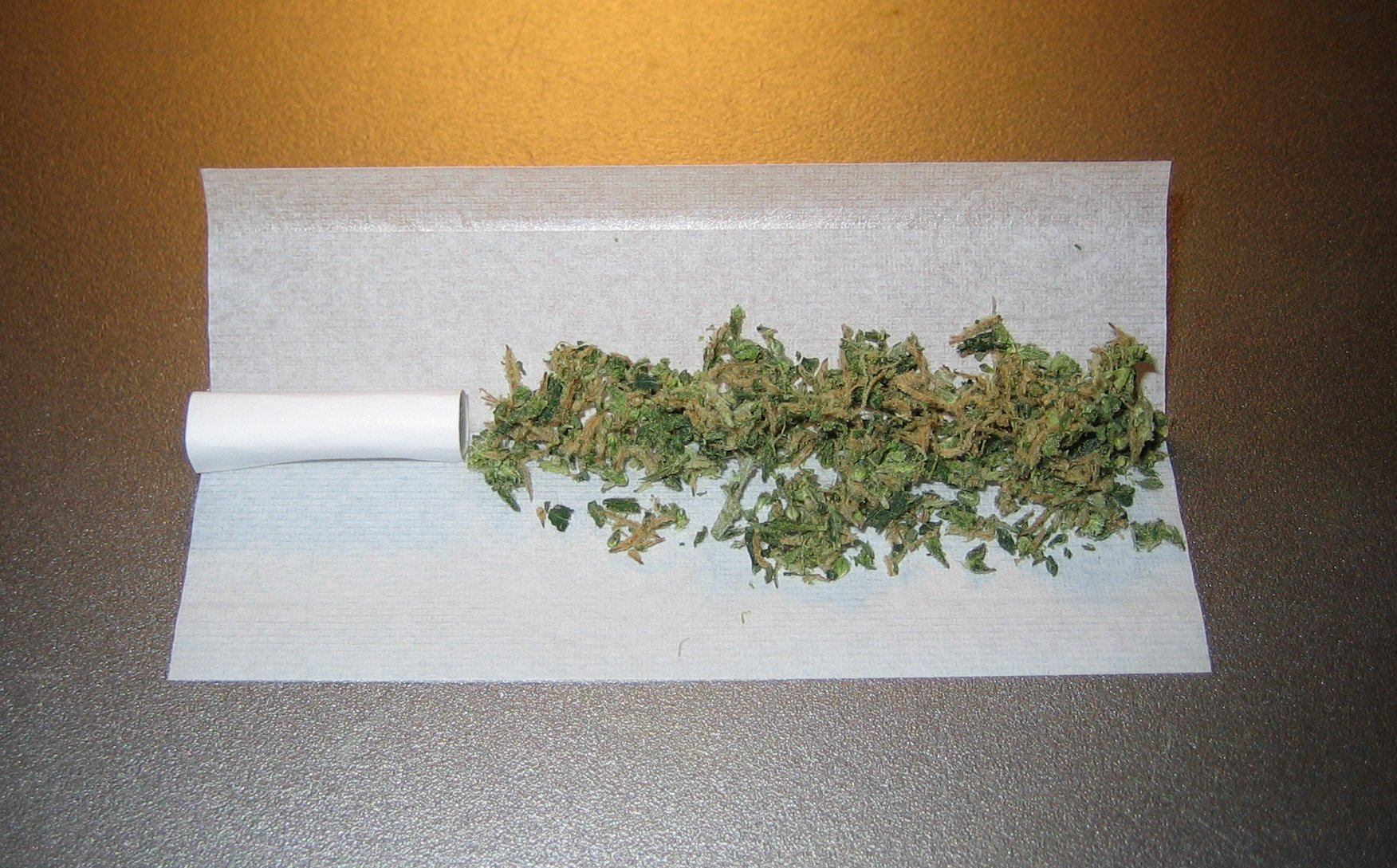
An unrolled joint with a paper filter on the left. These filters are commonly handmade from pieces of paper if they do not come bundled with filter papers.

The term drug paraphernalia refers to any equipment that is used to produce, conceal, and consume illicit drugs. It includes but is not limited to items such as bongs, roach clips, miniature spoons, and various types of pipes.

== Product types ==
Under federal law in the United States, the term drug paraphernalia means "any equipment, product or material of any kind which is primarily intended or designed for use in manufacturing, compounding, converting, concealing, producing, processing, preparing, injecting, ingesting, inhaling, or otherwise introducing into the human body a controlled substance."

=== Aluminum foil ===
"Chasing the dragon" (CTD) (traditional Chinese: 追龍; simplified Chinese: 追龙; pinyin: zhuī lóng; Jyutping: zeoi1 lung4), or "foily" in Australian English, refers to inhaling the vapor of a powdered psychoactive drug off a heated sheet of aluminium foil. The moving vapor is chased after with a tube (often rolled foil) through which the user inhales.

=== Banknotes (risky "drug paraphernalia") ===
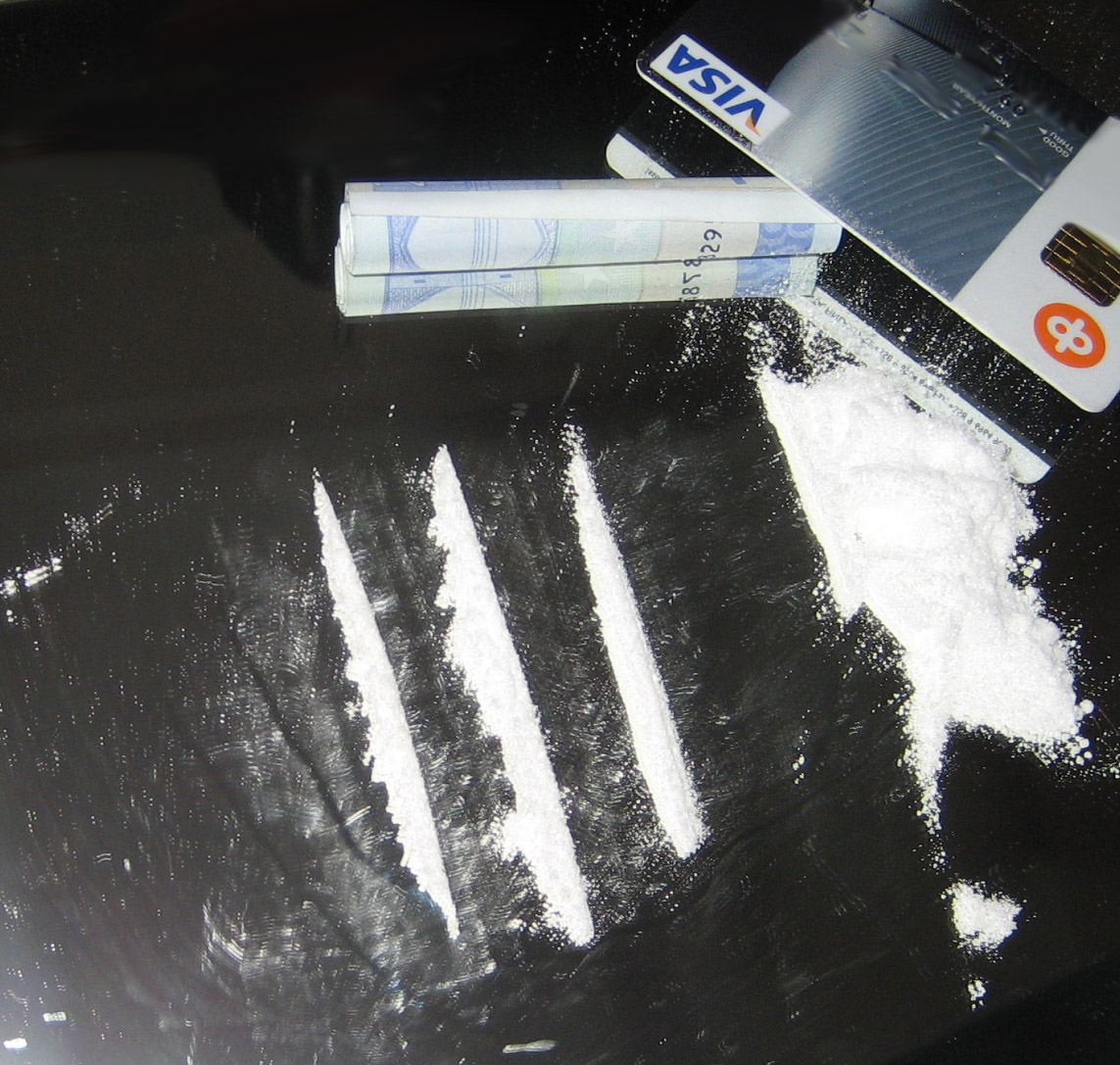
Lines of cocaine prepared for snorting. Contaminated currency such as banknotes might serve as a fomite of diseases like hepatitis C

Sharing snorting equipment (straws, banknotes, bullets, etc) has been linked to the transmission of hepatitis C. (Bonkovsky and Mehta) In one study, the University of Tennessee Medical Center researches warned that other blood-borne diseases such as HIV, the AIDS-causing virus, could be transmitted as well.

=== Love rose ===
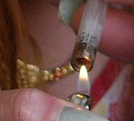
A love rose being used to smoke crack cocaine

A "love rose" is a glass tube with a paper or plastic rose inside of it, and a bit of cork or foil on the ends to keep the rose from falling out. While ostensibly intended as romantic gifts, their primary known use is as a pipe to smoke drugs such as crack cocaine or methamphetamine. They are commonly sold at convenience stores in the United States, particularly in inner-city locations.

=== Drug designed equipment ===
==== Bong ====
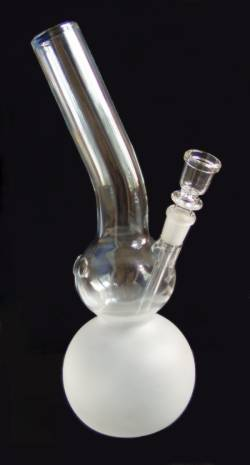
Bongs are an example of user-specific paraphernalia, in this case for the use of cannabis.

A bong (also known as a water pipe) is a filtration device generally used for smoking cannabis, tobacco, or other herbal substances.

Bongs have been in use by the Hmong in Laos and Thailand, as well all over Africa, for centuries.

==== Bulb syringe ====
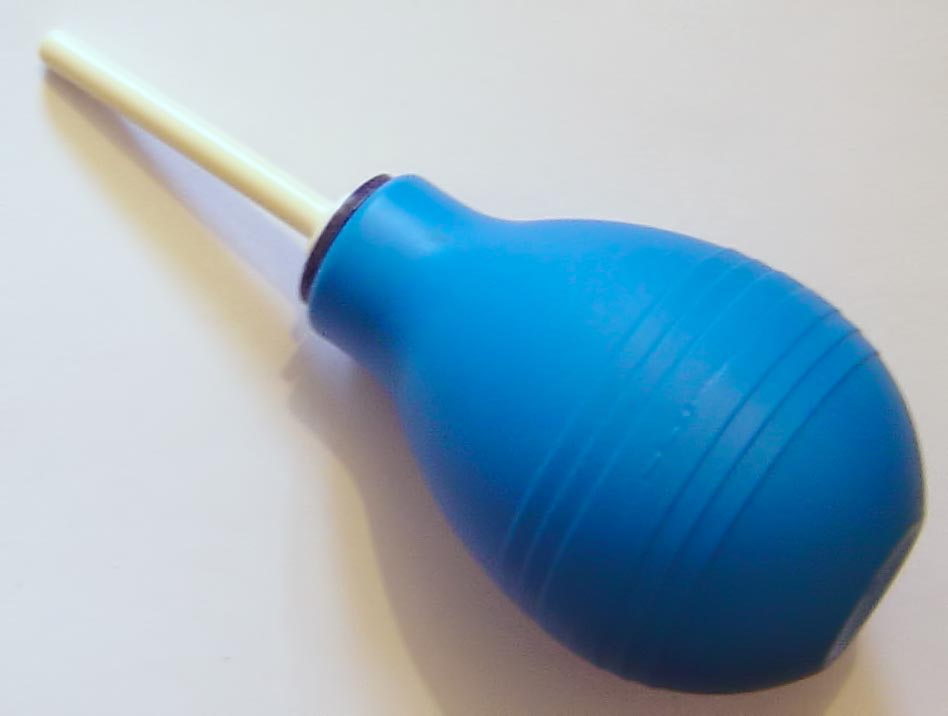
This enema bulb syringe features a bulb-shaped reservoir and a nozzle for delivering small amounts of fluid directly into the rectum.

==== Cocaine spoon ====
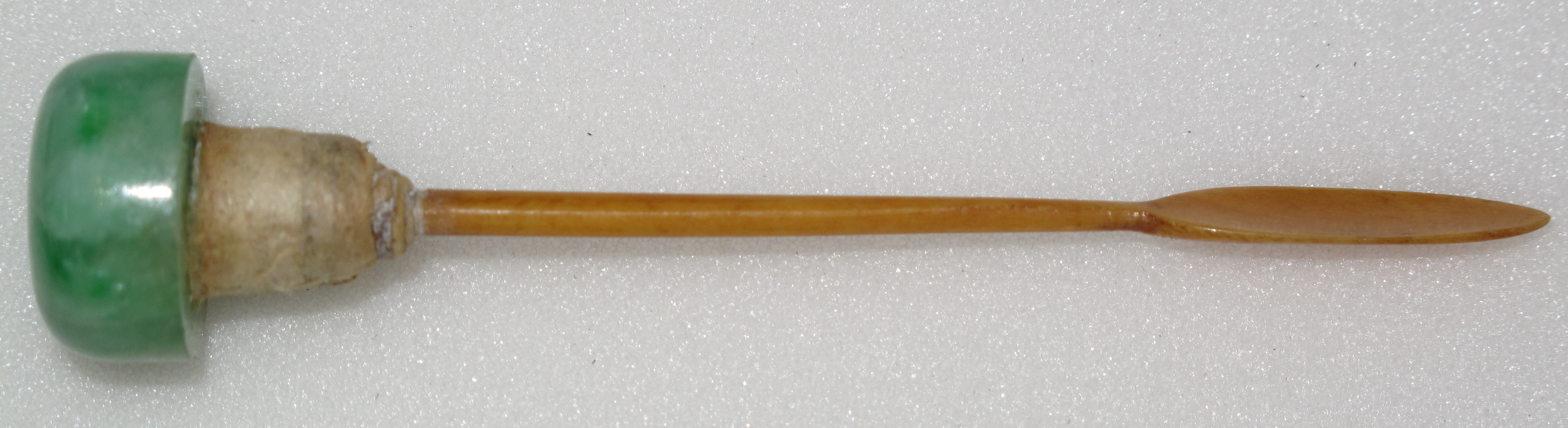
Chinese snuff bottle stopper with a snuff spoon (also known as a cocaine spoon)

A snuff spoon is a tiny spoon used for nasal insufflation of powdered substances. In the ancient time the spoons were used to ingest psychotropic substances, in the 18th century − tobacco, in the 20th century − cocaine (the spoon is thus also known as a cocaine spoon or coke spoon). Some local statutes in the US treat this spoon as drug paraphernalia, defining it as a spoon that is too small and thus "unsuited for the typical, lawful uses of a spoon".

==== Glass blades ====
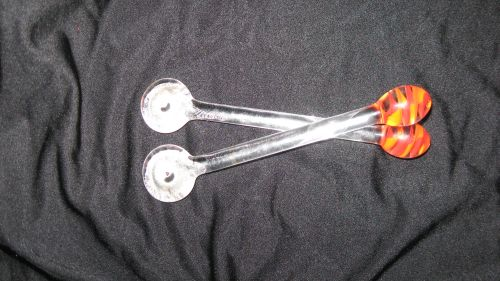
Glass blades

Spots (also known as spotting, knifers, knife hits, knife tokes, dots, hot knives, kitchen tracking blades, or bladers) refers to a method of smoking cannabis. Small pieces of cannabis are rolled (or simply torn from a larger bud) to form the spot.

The practice originated in the 1970s when drops or dabs of hashish oil were smoked (three dabs of hash oil were considered to be a good standard dose). Generally, the tips of two knife blades are heated, the spot or drop of hash oil, is compressed between the two blades, and the subsequent smoke is inhaled through the nose or mouth.

Another means that is gaining popularity is specially made glass presses heated with a propane or butane torch. In order to facilitate this process, a spottle (also referred to as a bowser, hooter or toker) or hitter is often, but not always, used to funnel the smoke and maximize the amount inhaled. A spottle is generally made from a funnel or cone-shaped container, such as the top (or neck) of a plastic or glass bottle or a gallon of milk/water.

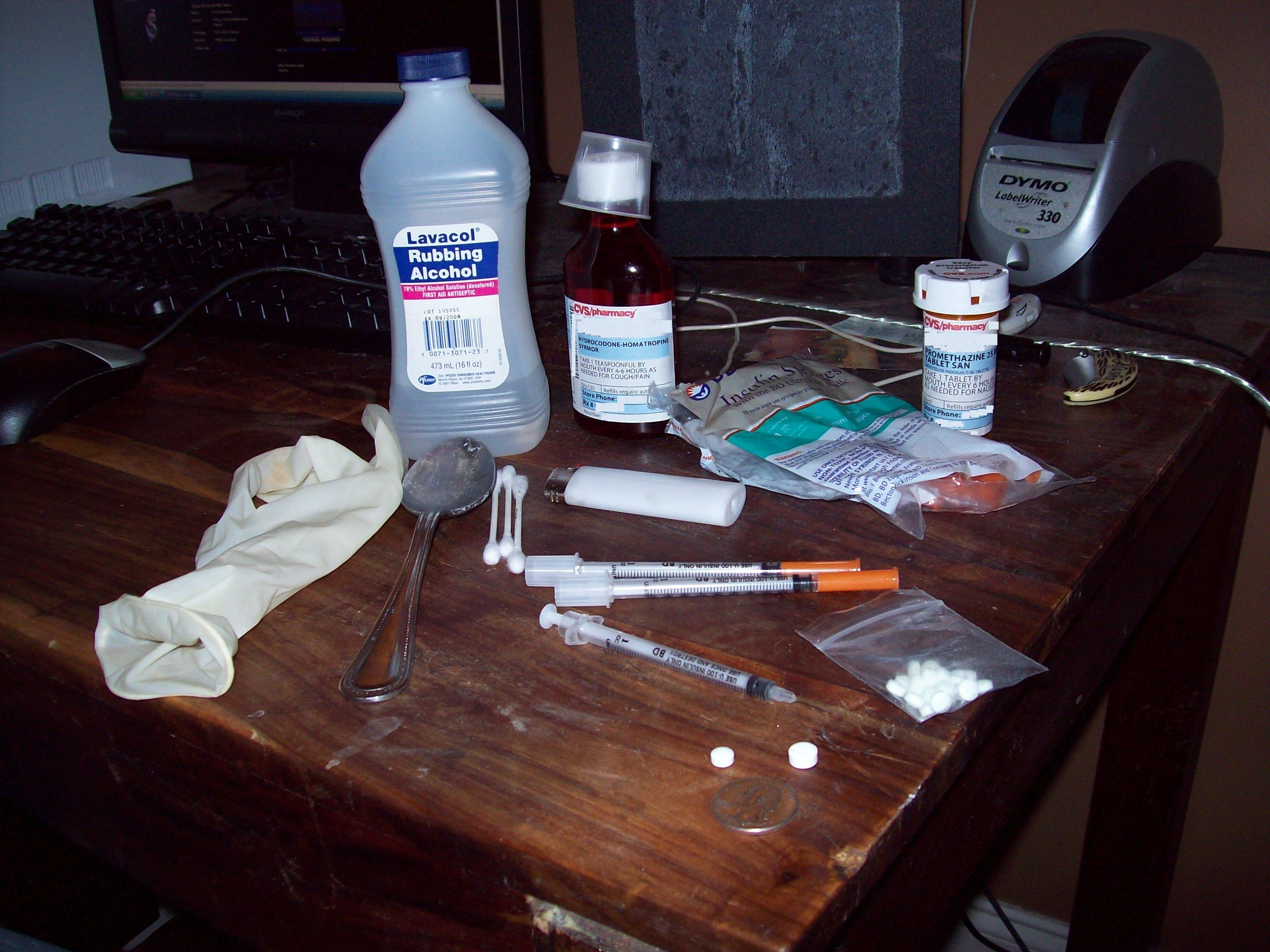
A clandestine kit containing materials to inject drugs, a bottle of a type of lean, promethazine, an antiemetic, and unidentified pills

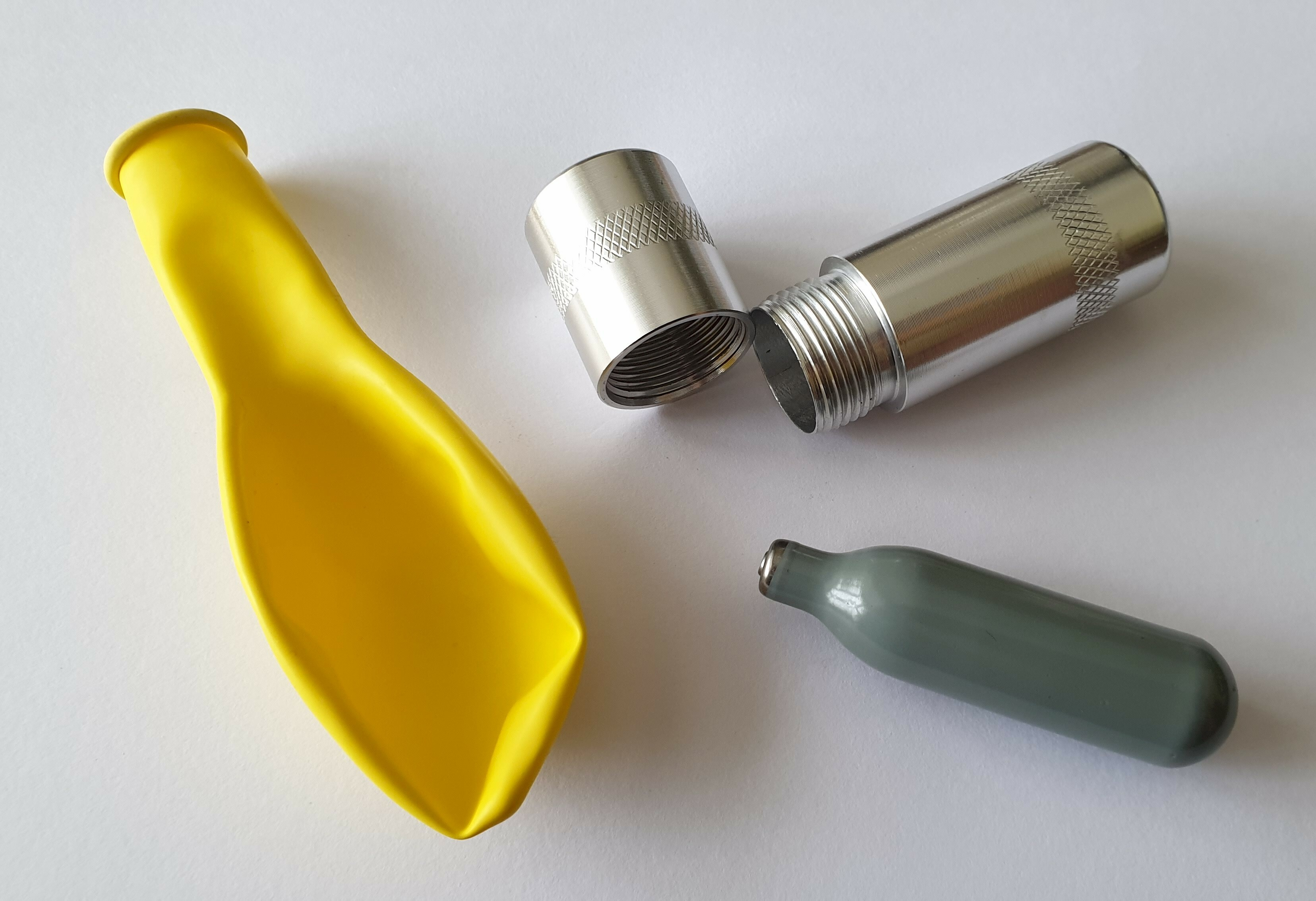
Food grade N_{2}O charger (bottom right), cracker (top right) and balloon

==== One-hitter ====
A one-hitter has been considered drug paraphernalia in certain regions.

==== Pizzo ====
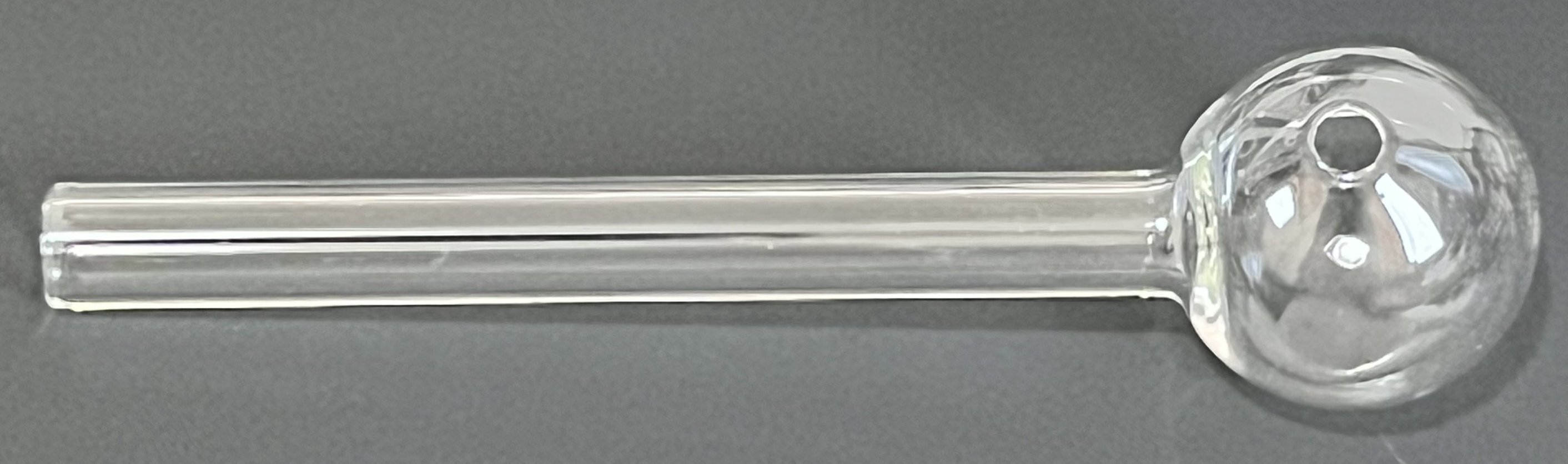
An oil burner pipe, commonly used in ingestion of free base psychoactive substances though inhalation.

A pizzo – also known as an pilo, oil burner, bubble, tweak pipe, meth pipe, gack pipe, crank pipe, crack pipe, pookie pipe, chicken bone, or ice pipe – AKA "Billy" – is a glass pipe which consists of a tube connected to a spherical bulb with a small opening on top designed for smoking methamphetamine or freebasing crack cocaine as well as other drugs. There are some legitimate uses for these pipes including applying the hole "on the top of an eucalyptus bottle" for inhaling aromas or moisture.

==== Snuff bullets ====
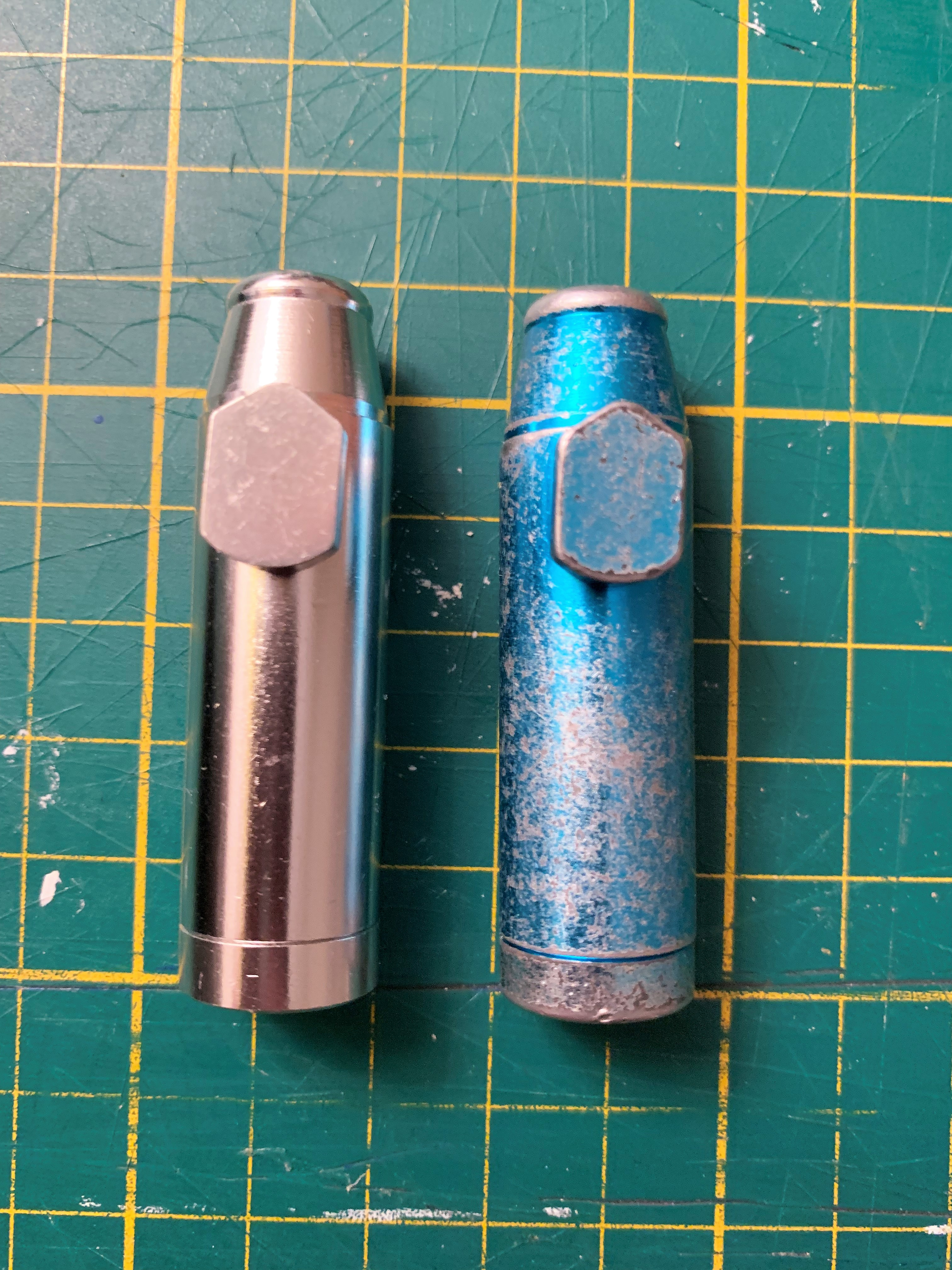
Two snuff bullets for snorting drugs in powder form. Snuff bullets are small portable devices used to store and snort/insulffate substances mainly cocaine

==== Free base equipment ====
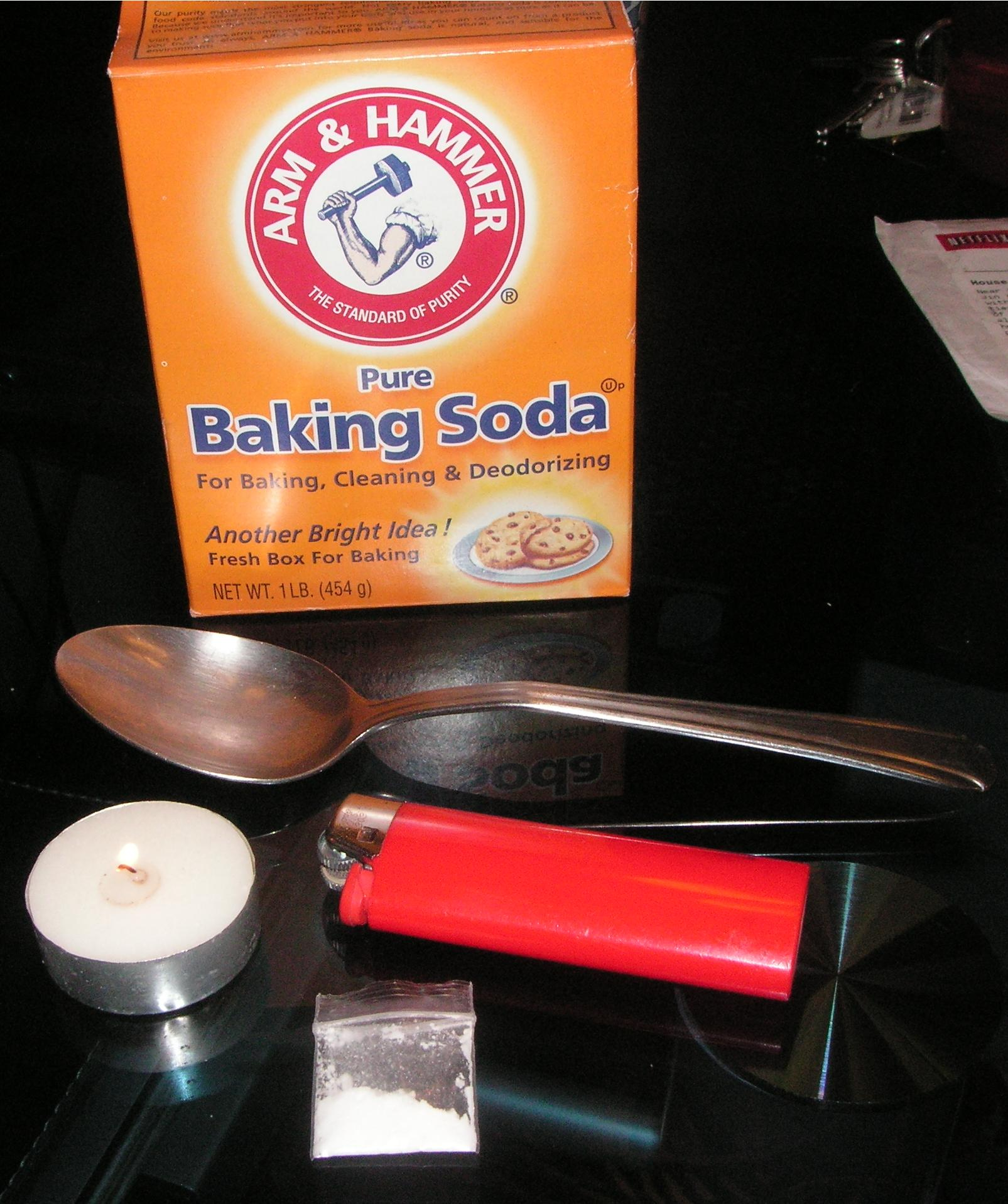
For cocaine (in a plastic bag at bottom) to be converted to crack, several supplies are needed. Pictured here are baking soda, a commonly used base in making crack, a metal spoon, a tealight, and a cigarette lighter. The spoon is held over the heat source to "cook" the cocaine into crack.

== Contamination ==
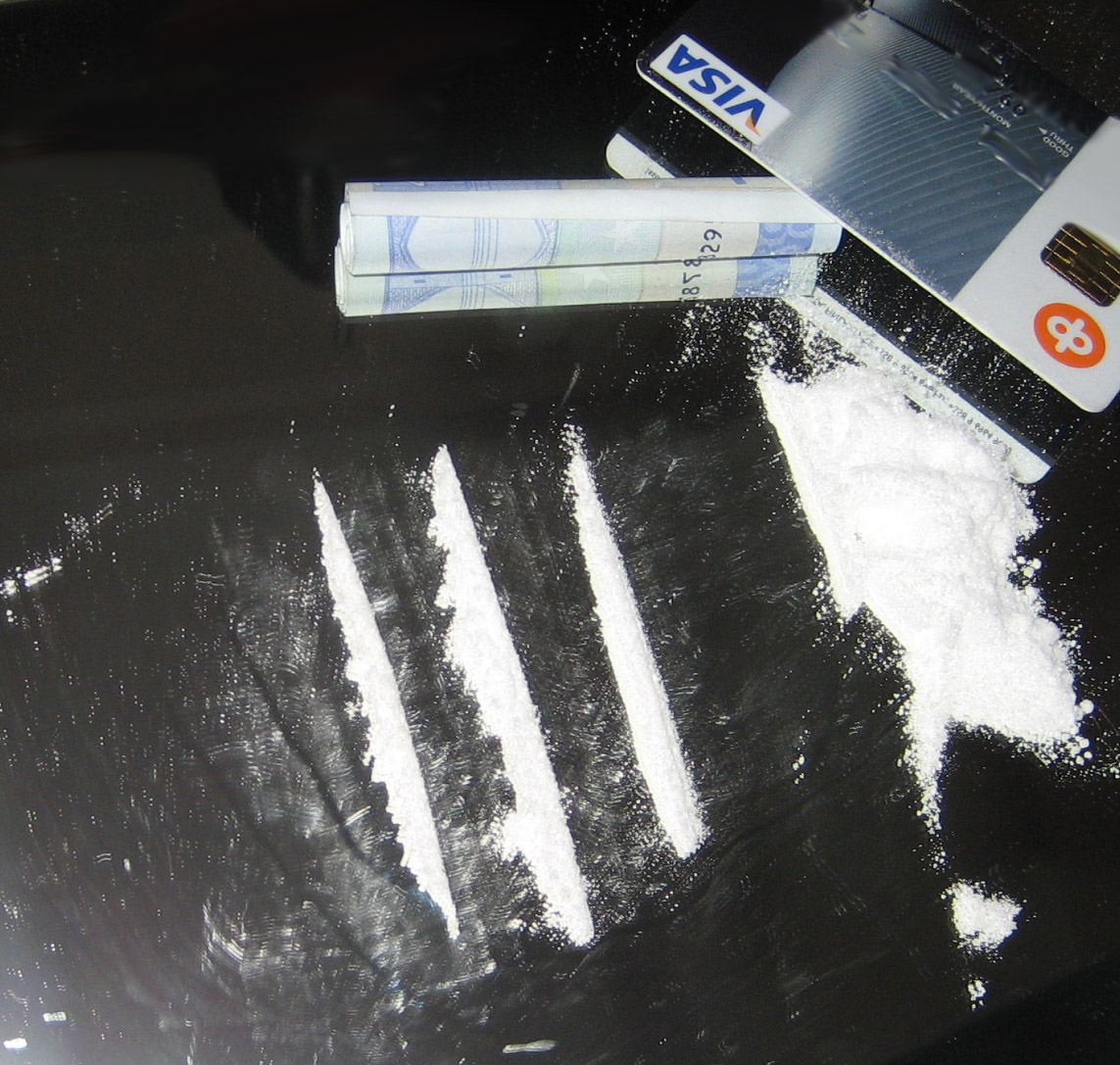
Banknotes frequently changes hands, increasing the risk of exposure to viruses from past users.

Sharing snorting equipment (straws, banknotes, bullets, etc) has been linked to the transmission of hepatitis C. (Bonkovsky and Mehta) In one study, the University of Tennessee Medical Center researches warned that other blood-borne diseases such as HIV, the AIDS-causing virus, could be transmitted as well.

Bongs that are cleaned regularly eliminates yeast, fungi, bacteria and pathogens that can cause several symptoms that vary from allergy to lung infection.

Re-used uncleaned vapes, and vape sharing, may cause bacterial pneumonia, fungal pneumonia, and viral pneumonia.

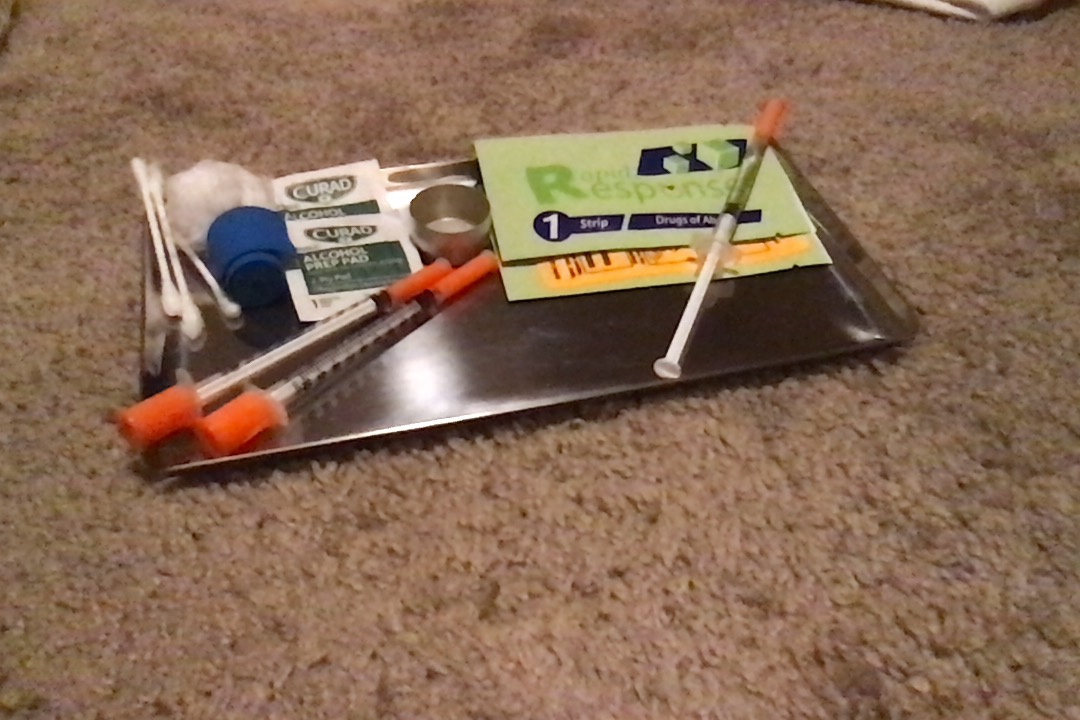
A collection of safe drug use supplies commonly used to inject heroin, fentanyl, or other illicit opioids

== Legality ==
=== United States ===
In the US, enterprising individuals would sell items openly in the street, until anti-paraphernalia laws in the 1980s eventually ended the practice. With the growth of the Internet, drug paraphernalia sellers have greatly expanded their sales to a worldwide market.

According to the Federal Drug Paraphernalia Statute, 21 USC 863, which is part of the Controlled Substances Act, in the US it is illegal to sell, transport through the mail, transport across state lines, import, or export drug paraphernalia as defined. Possession is usually illegal under State law. The law gives specific guidance on determining what constitutes drug paraphernalia. Many states have also enacted their own laws prohibiting drug paraphernalia. In the 1982 case Hoffman Estates v. The Flipside, Hoffman Estates, Inc., the US Supreme Court found a municipal ordinance requiring licensing for paraphernalia sales to have sufficiently distinguished marketing for illegal use to be constitutional. Government crackdowns have resulted in the arrest of sellers of recreational drug paraphernalia, such as actor Tommy Chong, who spent time in prison in 2003 for having his name used on bongs for sale via the Internet.

Head shops are very much alive and well in the US, however. Generally, though, they have signs near presumable paraphernalia saying "For tobacco use only" or "Not for use with illicit drugs." Many also ban customers for referencing the use of illegal drugs when buying items. Similar policies are used in online head shops, where customers are often made to verify detailed disclaimers of their non-use of illegal substances before buying items.

==== Reagent testing ====
Home pill testing equipment is illegal in the US state of Illinois where the (720 ILCS 600/) Drug Paraphernalia Control Act specifically outlaws "testing equipment intended to be used unlawfully in a private home for identifying or in analyzing the strength, effectiveness or purity of cannabis or controlled substances".

=== United Kingdom ===
In the UK, while cannabis is illegal, owning drug paraphernalia is not illegal, but under the Misuse of Drugs Act 1971, the individual may be committing a criminal offense if the items contain traces of drugs.

Under Section 9A of the Misuse of Drugs Act 1971, It is a criminal offense "to supply or offer to supply an object for providing or preparing a controlled drug if a person believes that the article will be used in circumstances where the administration is unlawful. If convicted in a magistrates' court, the penalty is a maximum of six months in prison and/or a £5,000 fine. {{CIA World Factbook}}

=== Sweden ===
==== Injection equipment ====
In Sweden, pharmacies can only sell syringes and hypodermic needles to people with a doctor's prescription for medical use.

== See also ==
- Drug checking
- Harm reduction
- One hitter (smoking)
- Philadelphia blunt ban
- Paraphernalia
- Recreational drug use

== Sources ==
- Childress, David Hatcher (2012). Ancient Technology in Peru & Bolivia. Adventures Unlimited Press. ISBN 978-1-935487-81-4. OCLC 788245749.
- Hopkins, Tighe (1897). "The Spoon". The Leisure Hour. Vol. 47. W. Stevens, printer. pp. 51–56. OCLC 145390810.
