= Artemisia =

Artemisia may refer to:

== People ==
- Artemisia I of Caria (fl. 480 BC), queen of Halicarnassus under the First Persian Empire, naval commander during the second Persian invasion of Greece
- Artemisia II of Caria (died 350 BC), queen of Caria under the First Persian Empire, ordered the construction of the Mausoleum at Halicarnassus
- Artemisia Gentileschi (1593–1656/1653), Italian painter
- Artemisia Iorfino (born 2009), Italian artistic gymnast

== Places ==
- Artemisia, Messinia, a Greek village west of Taygetus mountain in the Peloponnese
- Artemisia, Zakynthos, a municipality on Zakynthos, Greece
- Artemisia Geyser, in Yellowstone National Park, US
- Artemisia pipe, a diatreme in the Northwest Territories, Canada
- Kingdom of Artemisia, a regional designation created by the Society for Creative Anachronism

== Opera ==
- Artemisia (Cavalli), a 1657 opera by Cavalli
- Artemisia, a 1754 opera seria by Johann Adolph Hasse
- Artemisia, Regina di Caria, a 1797 opera by Domenico Cimarosa
- Artemisia (Cimarosa), an 1801 opera by Domenico Cimarosa

== Other ==
- Artemisia (Rembrandt), a 1634 painting by Rembrandt
- Artemisia (ship), 1848, the first government immigrant ship to arrive in Moreton Bay, Queensland
- Artemisia (film), a 1997 French film about the Italian painter
- Artemisia (album), a 2007 album by the Dutch band Sun Caged
- Artemisia (plant), a genus of plants including the sagebrush and wormwood

== See also ==
- Artemisia asiatica (disambiguation)
- Artemisia of Caria (disambiguation)
- Artemia, a genus of brine shrimp
- Artemesia (disambiguation)
- Artemisa (disambiguation)
- Artemis (disambiguation)
