= Artemesia =

Artemesia may refer to:

- Artemisia I of Caria, a female general of the Persian King Xerxes
- Artemesia (crustacean), a genus of prawns in the family Penaeidae
- Artemesia Geyser, Yellowstone National Park, United States
- Lake Artemesia, a man-made lake in Prince George's County, Maryland, United States
- Artemesia, a township in the Canadian municipality of Grey Highlands, Ontario, Canada

== See also ==
- Artemisia (disambiguation)
- Artemisa (disambiguation)
- Artemia
- Artemis (disambiguation)
