= Vaporizer =

Vaporizer or vaporiser may refer to:

- Anesthetic vaporizer, a device used in the administration of anesthesia
- Electronic cigarette, or a part of one
- Humidifier, a household appliance that increases humidity
- Vaporizer (inhalation device), a device used to extract for inhalation the active ingredients of chemicals or plant materials
- Vaporizer (internal combustion engine), a device to enable an engine to run on tractor vaporizing oil
- Metal vapor synthesis, a technique that involves vaporizing metals

== See also ==
- Atomization (disambiguation)
- Carburetor
- Nebulizer
- Ultrasonic nozzle
