= Magic-Flight Launch Box =

Cannabis vaporizer

- Type: Cannabis vaporizer
- Inception: 2009
- Manufacturer: Magic-Flight
- Available: Available
- Current supplier: Magic-Flight
- Website: official site

The Magic-Flight Launch Box (occasionally abbreviated to "MFLB") is a portable, dry-herb cannabis vaporizer that has been in production since 2009. It was designed by Forrest Landry.

== Reception ==
The Magic-Flight Launch Box has received positive reviews. Writing for the New York Times, Matthias Schwartz said that the device "isn’t very easy to operate" due to its multiple variables such as battery charge and airflow but stated that he considered this a feature rather than a bug as it encouraged moderation.

In his write-up for Gizmodo, Andrew Tarantola gave the Magic-Flight Launch Box a more mixed review, saying that while he enjoyed the device's efficiency, stating that "A little herb goes a long way in a Launch box.", he disliked the fact that the pine wood the device was made of dried out his lips. Furthermore, he found that the batteries were prone to shorting out, warning readers to keep the black caps on when not in use. He recommended the device to "people who want to own a travel vaporizer with none of the modern conveniences found on other models. Possibly the Amish."
