= Atomization =

Atomization refers to breaking bonds in some substance to obtain its constituent atoms in gas phase. By extension, it also means separating something into fine particles, for example: process of breaking bulk liquids into small droplets.

Atomization may also refer to:

== Science and technology ==
- The making of an aerosol, which is a colloidal suspension of fine solid particles or liquid droplets in a gas
- An apparatus using an atomizer nozzle
- Sprays, mists, fogs, clouds, dust clouds and smoke, which appear to be atomized
- A nebulizer, which is a device used to administer medication in the form of a mist inhaled into the lungs
- An electronic cigarette atomiser is a component which employs a heating element to vaporize a flavored solution, that may or may not contain nicotine, for inhalation into the lungs
- The conversion of a vaporized sample into atomic components in atomic spectroscopy

== Sociology ==
- Atomization is frequently used as a synonym for social alienation.

== The arts ==
- Atomizer (album), a 1986 album by Big Black
- Atomizer (band), a British synthpop duo
- Atomised, a 1998 novel by Michel Houellebecq
- In fiction, the complete disintegration of a targeted object into the atoms which constitute it is accomplished by shooting it with a disintegrator ray
- The Atomizer, a fictional baseball bat melee weapon for the Scout class in the 2007 video game Team Fortress 2

== Places ==
- Atomizer Geyser, a cone geyser in Yellowstone National Park.

== See also ==
- Enthalpy of atomization
- Atom
- Spray bottle
