= Artemisa (disambiguation) =

Artemisa is a Cuban town and capital of Artemisa Province.

Artemisa may also refer to:

- Artemisa Formation, a geologic formation in Cuba
- Artemisa Province, a Cuban province
- FC Artemisa, a Cuban football club

== See also ==
- Artemisia (disambiguation)
- Artemesia (disambiguation)
- Artemis (disambiguation)
