= Eagle Bill =

American marijuana medicine man (1924–2005)

Frank William Wood (April 10, 1942 – May 22, 2005), better known as Eagle Bill Amato, was a Cherokee medicine man and cannabis activist best known for popularizing the vaporizer in cannabis culture.

Eagle Bill is also the inventor of the first popular portable vaporizer, the Eagle Bill Shake & Vape. He was born in Cleveland, Ohio.
