= Artemisia (ship) =

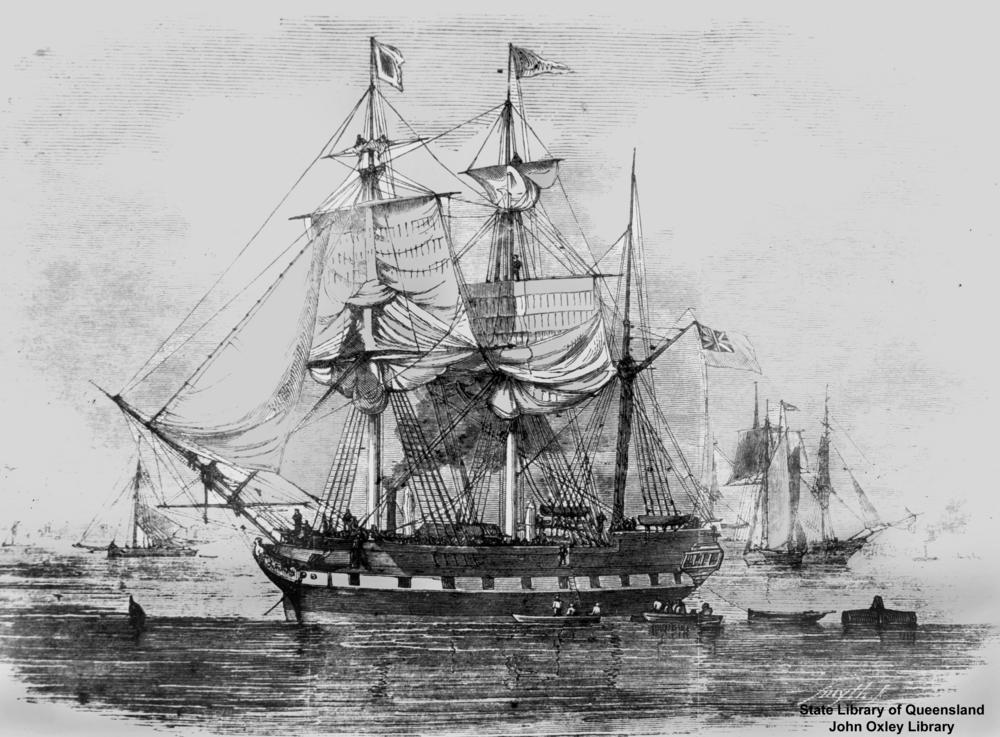
- Artemisia from illustration by Frederick Smyth in the Illustrated London News, 12 August 1848

History
- Name: Artemisia
- Owner: A. Ridley
- Builder: Sunderland
- Launched: 1847

General characteristics
- Tons burthen: 492 tons

The Artemisia (Note: Almost all sources spell the name Artemisia; however, the spelling Artemesia has been used in at least one source: Ronald Wood (1990) "Artemesia: the first migrant ship to Moreton Bay", Journal of the Royal Historical Society of Queensland, Vol. 14 no. 5, pp. 181–183.) was the first immigrant ship to arrive in Moreton Bay bringing the first assisted free settlers from England. She was a barquentine of 492 tons built at Sunderland in 1847 and owned by A. Ridley. Under her master, Captain John Prest Ridley, the Artemisia arrived in Moreton Bay in December 1848.

== Free settlers for Moreton Bay ==
The Moreton Bay Settlement was established in 1824 as a place of secondary punishment for convicts sentenced by the colonial courts in New South Wales and the newly separated colony of Van Diemen's Land. It was opened to free settlement in 1842. By 1846, North Brisbane had 483 European settlers, South Brisbane 346 and Ipswich (formerly known as Limestone) 103. A great labour shortage had developed: manual workers, shepherds, tradesmen and domestics were needed by the pastoralists and by those living within the towns.

The Reverend Dr John Dunmore Lang, who had sponsored German missionaries to the Moreton Bay settlement in 1835, visited the district again in 1845 and decided to travel to Britain in 1846 to recruit free settlers for Cooksland, the name he gave to north-eastern Australia. However, Lang had antagonised both the colonial and imperial authorities and his mission to England spurred the government to organise its own emigrant efforts.

The Land and Emigration Commissioners were charged with British emigration. In a report dated 1 August 1848 to Under Secretary Merivale, the commissioners advised that they had received recent, urgent representations on behalf of New South Wales for emigrant vessels to ports other than Sydney and Melbourne. They advertised for vessels for Moreton Bay and Twofold Bay and chose the Artemisia for Moreton Bay.

== The ship and her master ==
Built at Sunderland in 1847, the Artemisia was a new vessel, a barquentine of 492 tons owned by Anthony Ridley, and the journey to Australia was the maiden voyage. The master of the Artemisia was Captain John Prest Ridley who was to command her on other voyages. He died in Mauritius aged 47 on 6 June 1859 when in command of the Adamant.

The upper deck of the ship was fitted out for the wealthier passengers.

== Emigration arrangements ==
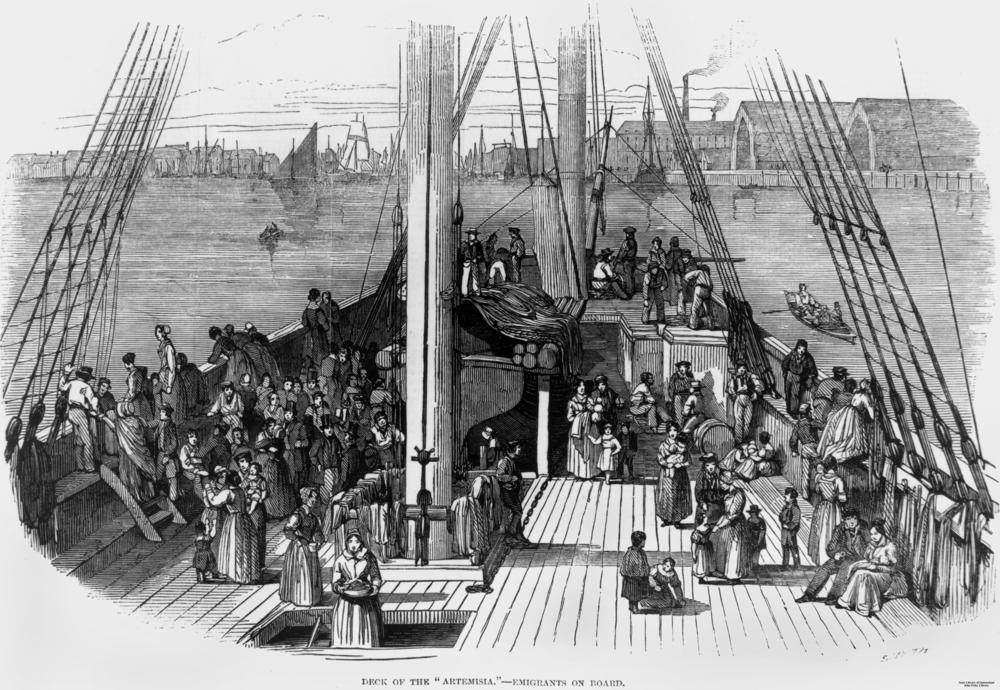
Deck of the Artemisia, emigrants on board, at Deptford Dockyard, by Frederick Smyth from the Illustrated London News, 12 August 1848 p 96

The Artemisia was inspected by The "Illustrated London News" which reported in its 12 August 1848 number the following arrangements prevailing at the time:

"We should first explain that it is not as generally known as it should be, that the Government gives free passage (including food), to New South Wales and South Australia, to agricultural labourers, shepherds, female domestic and farm servants, and dairy maids; also, to a few blacksmiths, wheelwrights, carpenters, and other country mechanics. The vessels are first-class, and proceed every month to Sydney and Port Philip, in New South Wales, and to Port Adelaide, in South Australia. The ships sail from London and Plymouth, where dépôts are fitted up for the emigrants.

"The conditions may be learned from The Colonisation Circular, issued by her Majesty's Colonial Land and Emigration Commissioners, so that we need not here enter into the details. We may, however, mention that the emigrants must be of good character, and recommended for sobriety and industry. Each must provide himself with clothing and, on being accepted, must pay £1 10 shillings for every child under 14, as security that he will come forward and embark.

"During the voyage they are placed under the exclusive superintendence of the surgeon, not only as their doctor, but as their sole superintendent and, on their arrival, a Government Agent gives advice as to wages, and places where they will get work. No repayment is required. ...

"Saturday, July 29th, was the day fixed for the departure of the Artemisia. She lay off the stairs adjoining the Royal Dockyard at Deptford, near which, also, is the dépôt. This is a house rented by Mr. Cooper, who receives here any persons who may produce an 'Embarkation Order' for any ship chartered by the Government Commissioners. The premises are situated in Czar Street, Deptford, nearly upon the spot where Peter the Great, a century and half ago, learned practical shipbuilding. ... Here the applicants, provided they appear on the date specified in the Order, are boarded and lodged at two shillings per day, paid by the Commissioners; they are kept there until they have been examined as to the state of their health by the surgeon appointed to the ship in which they are to embark and by Lieutenant Lean, R.N., the Emigration Officer, and his assistant, Mr. Smith, as to their answering the description given of themselves as to their previous occupation. During their stay here, they are treated with kindness and attention. The above enquiries are, however, indispensable, and should the applicants appear in every respect eligible for free passage, arrangements are made for berthing and messing the passengers: a ticket with a number is a fixed to his or her berth; the bags and messing utensils are given out, and on the former is marked the number, so that each knows his or her berth, ongoing board. To each adult is also supplied bedding, which is put into the respective berths. These preliminaries usually occupy three days."

== Unaccompanied child migrants ==
Whilst the Illustrated London News were undertaking their inspection, the then Lord Ashley arrived on board, and made a tour of the vessel. His visit was occasioned by the berths on the lower decks of seven boys and two girls from his Ragged Schools at Westminster, the first batch of abandoned children to be sent to the colonies. The News reported that another 150 London children were awaiting the same fate. The eldest of the boys had been taken from "the street in a wretched condition, almost without clothing" and was being "sent out at the private expense of a Lady and two gentlemen."

== First leg, London to Plymouth ==
On 27 July 1848 the Artemisia previously berthed in the East India Dock, London sailed to Plymouth according to the Lloyd's Register. There were 209 passengers on board. The "Illustrated London News" reported that more passengers were to be taken on at Plymouth and gave the following breakdown of those who embarked at London:

Class	Males	Females	Persons
Married couples (42)	42	42	84
Male children	32	–	32
Male infants (under 12 months)	4	–	4
Females (between 1 and 14)	–	23	23
Female infants	–	4	4
Single men	42	–	42
Single women	–	20	20
Total	120	89	209

At Plymouth, another 31 embarked to bring the complement to 240. Once aboard, the passengers came under the care of Dr. George K. Barton, the medical superintendent. From Plymouth, the Artemisia set sail for Moreton Bay on 15 August 1848.

== Launceston, then off Sydney Heads ==
The Sydney Morning Herald had carried reports of the Plymouth departure and expected arrival of the Artemisia since October 1848. On 15 November 1848, the Hobart Courier reported that the Artemisia was in the port of Launceston "loading for Moreton Bay." On 13 December 1848, the Sydney Morning Herald reprinted the report from the Illustrated London News from 12 August and carried a report on the arrival off Sydney Heads of the Artemisia. Having signalled for a pilot, a Mr Gibson set out to guide her into Port Jackson. The report continued:

"Upon getting on board, however, he was informed by the captain, who was ill in bed from a disease of the liver, that it was not his intention to come into this port, and that he wished him to proceed in the vessel to Moreton Bay, having no chart of the place himself, and his chief officer knowing nothing of the coast. This Mr. Gibson declined doing, and advised the captain to allow him to take the vessel into harbour, when he would he able to obtain a competent person to do the duty he wished. Captain Riddle (sic) not falling in with Mr. Gibson's suggestion, the latter quitted the vessel, and had a narrow escape of losing his own life, and those of his boat's crew, for, on the boat entering the heads, a gale commenced from the southward, and a terrific sea instantly rising, the men were unable to pull against it. On two or three occasions they were almost buried in the sea; but fortunately, with a great deal of exertion, were enabled to run up North Harbour, where they encamped for the night, returning to Watson's Bay, yesterday morning. The only recompense we believe Mr. Gibson received from Captain Ridley was £2. With the strong southerly wind of Saturday night, the Artemisia, is doubtless now a considerable way on towards her destination. She spoke no vessels on the passage connected with the colonies. Three deaths and four births occurred on the voyage."

== Moreton Bay ==
On 13 December 1848, the "Artemisia" arrived off Cape Moreton.

On 5 January 1849, the "Artemisia" set sail for Sydney where she loaded wool for London.
