= Vaporizer (inhalation device) =

Device to vaporize substances for inhalation

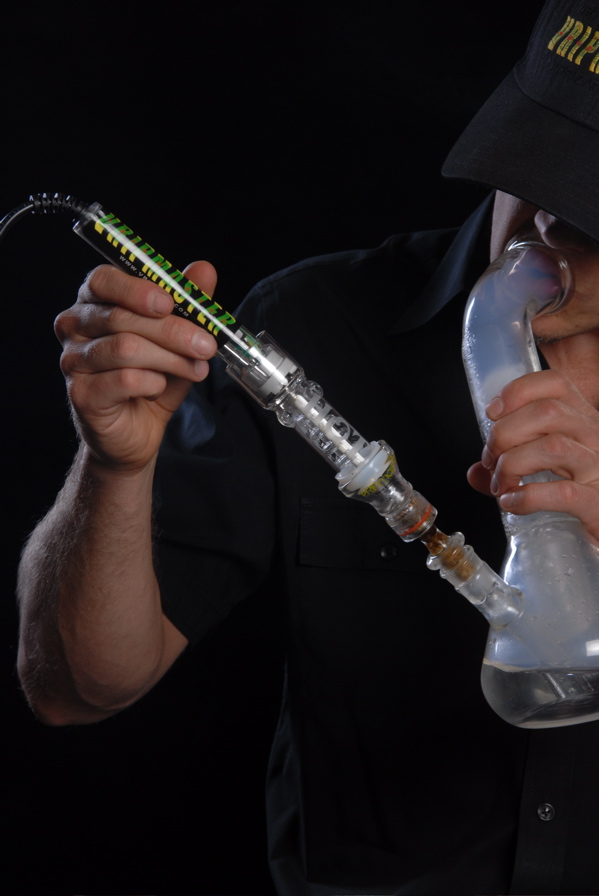
A vaporization heat wand and vaporization chamber bowl used to deliver vapor through a water pipe

A vaporizer or vaporiser, colloquially known as a vape, is a device used to vaporize substances for inhalation. Plant substances can be used, commonly cannabis, tobacco, or other herbs or blends of essential oil. They are most commonly filled with a combination propylene glycol, glycerin, and drugs such as nicotine from tobacco or tetrahydrocannabinol (THC) from cannabis as a liquid solution.

Vaporizers contain various forms of extraction chambers including straight bore, venturi, or sequential venturi, and are made of materials such as metal or glass. The extracted vapor may be collected in an inflatable bag, or inhaled directly through a hose or pipe. When used properly, cooler temperatures due to lack of combustion result in significantly more efficient extraction of the ingredients. Hence, the irritating and harmful effects of smoking are heavily reduced, as is its secondhand smoke.

== Cannabis vaporizers ==
Cannabis flower is commonly consumed using a dry-herb vaporizer. The cannabis may be heated in a chamber via indirect flame exposure or an electrical heating element, typically using either conduction or convection heating methods, allowing users to inhale the resulting vapor. The temperatures reached are cooler than the combustion temperature of cannabis, which is around 230–315 °C (445–600 °F).

Cannabis is also consumed via the vaporization of cannabis concentrates or oils extracted from the plant, commonly referred to as "dabbing". Users typically employ a torch to heat a small cup shaped quartz or titanium attachment on a bong before dabbing the oil onto the heated surface and inhaling the vapors through the bong. This route of consumption is generally much more potent than smoking or vaporizing marijuana flower due to the increased concentration of cannabinoids. Users typically report that the effects of dabbing are much more intense than regular cannabis, while also being shorter lived.

Cannabis concentrate is also commonly used in e-cigarette style vaporizer pens in the form of liquid containers known as cartridges. A battery connected to the atomizer is used to heat the cannabis oil, creating a vapor that is inhaled by the user. Cartridges typically contain different preparations of cannabis oil mixed with cannabinoids, terpenes, solvents (primarily Propylene glycol and Glycerol) used for thinning, fatty acids, and flavonoids. Natural or artificial terpenes are frequently added by manufacturers to enhance flavor, often using blends that mimic popular cannabis strains or sugary foods such as candy or pastries.

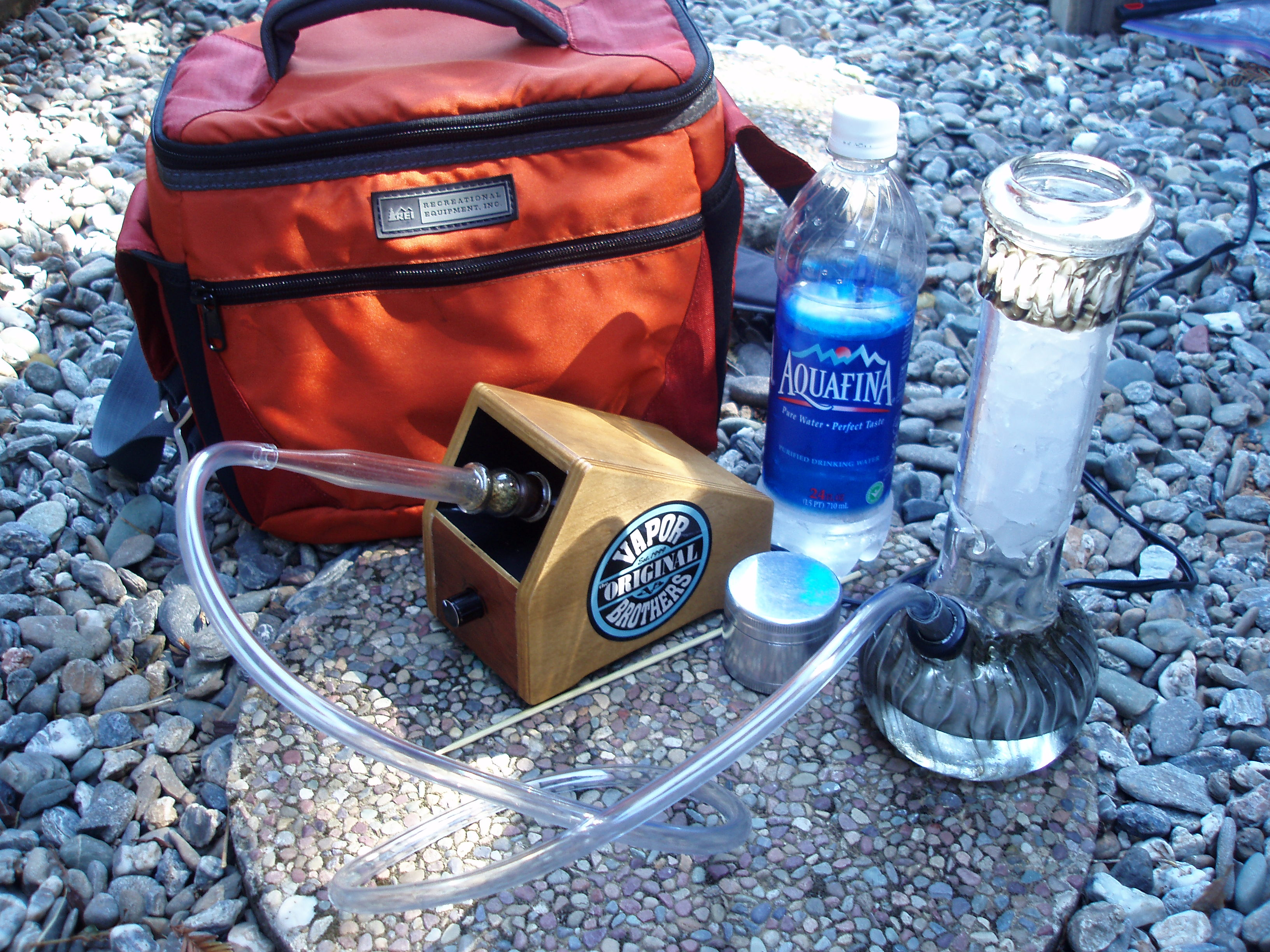
Vaporizer with water-cooling

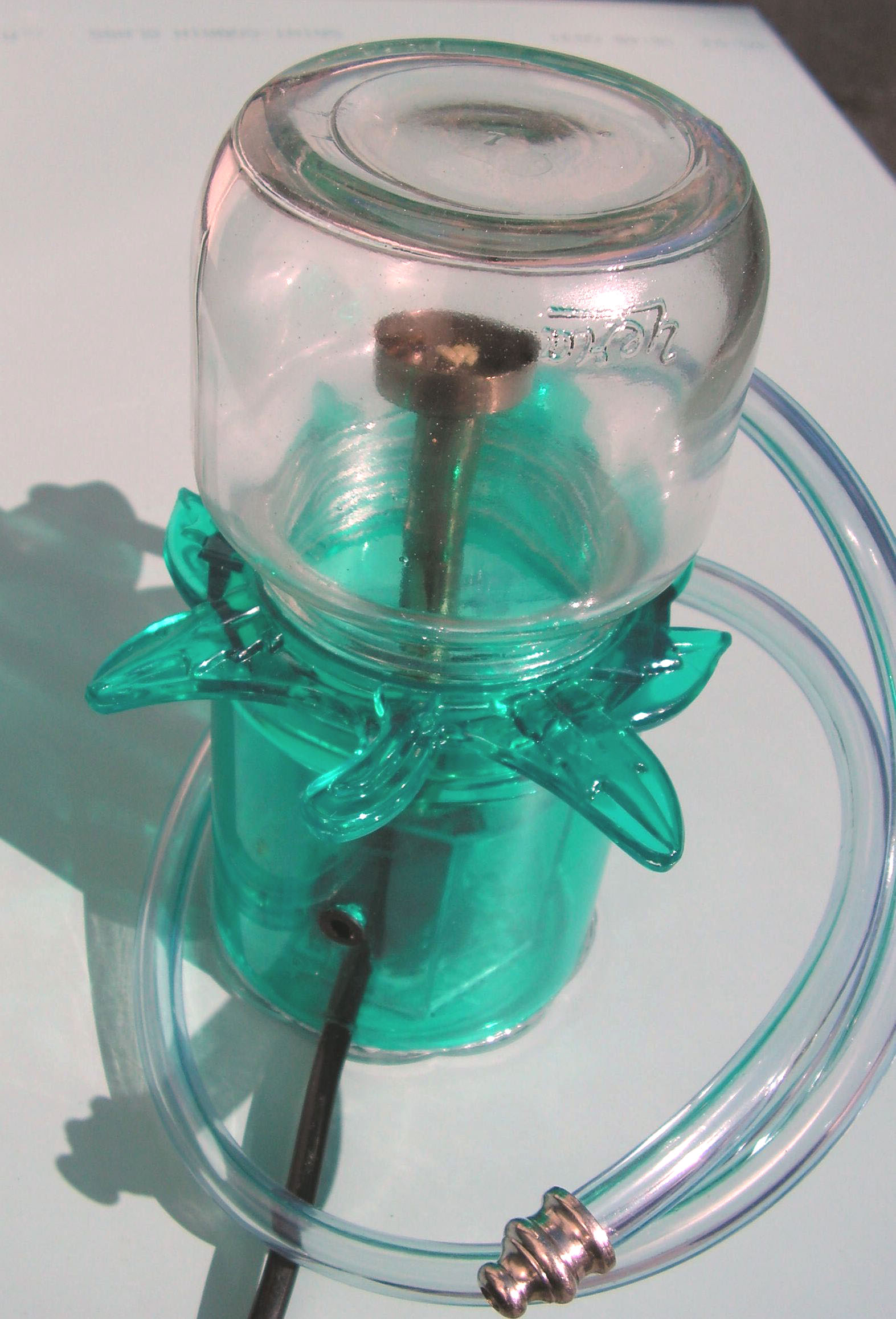
A conduction-style vaporizer

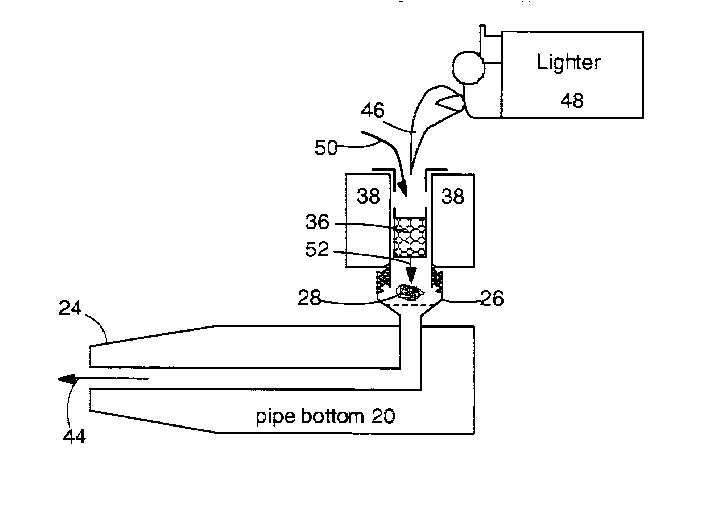
A passive-convection "vaporization pipe" with flame filter

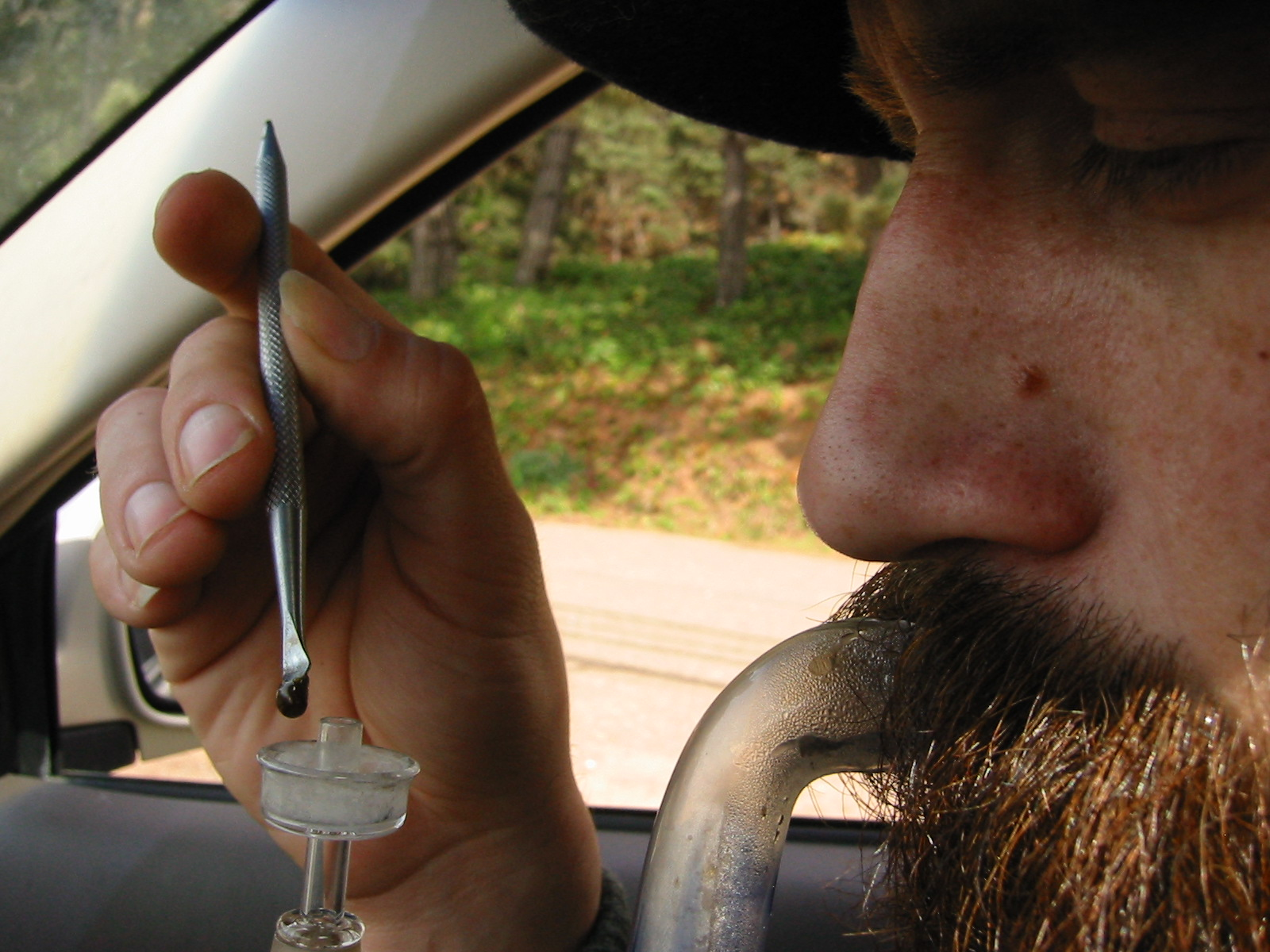
A man inhaling cannabis concentrate vapor from a dab rig

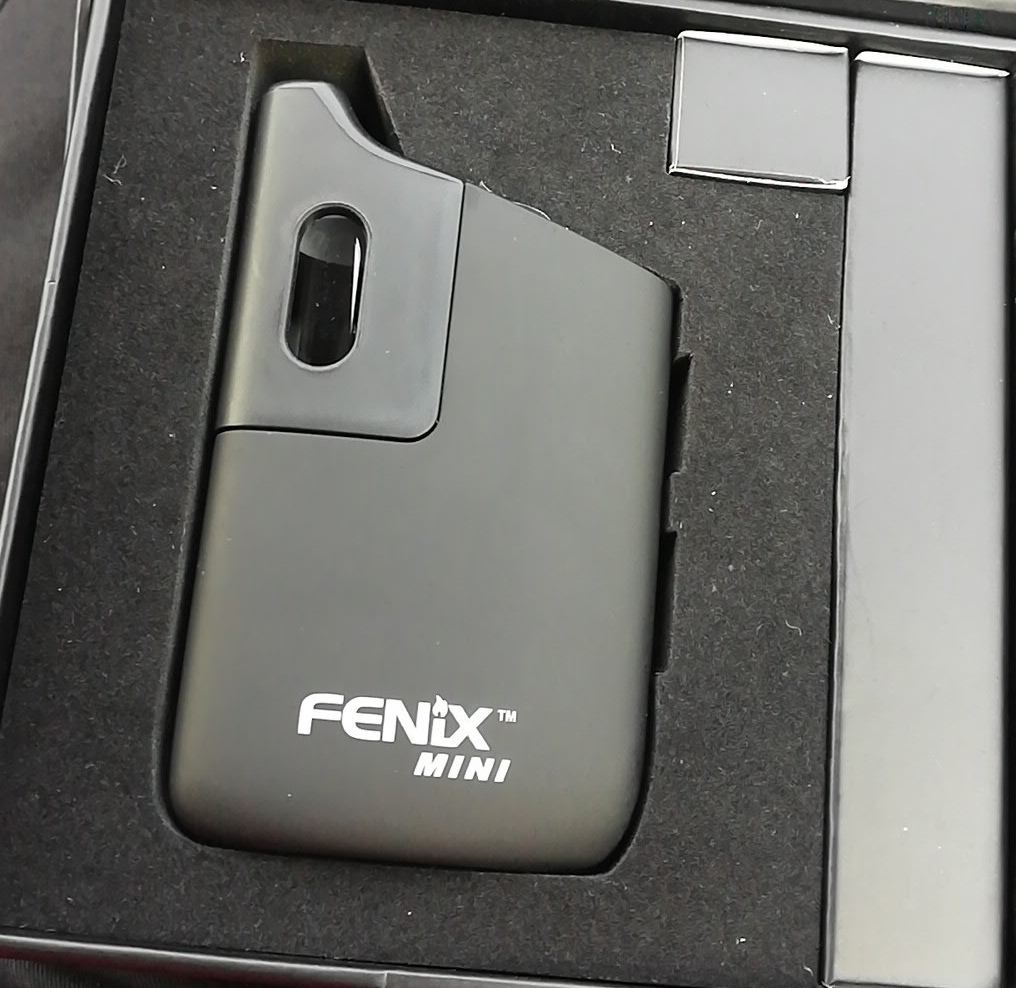
Cannabis vaporizer

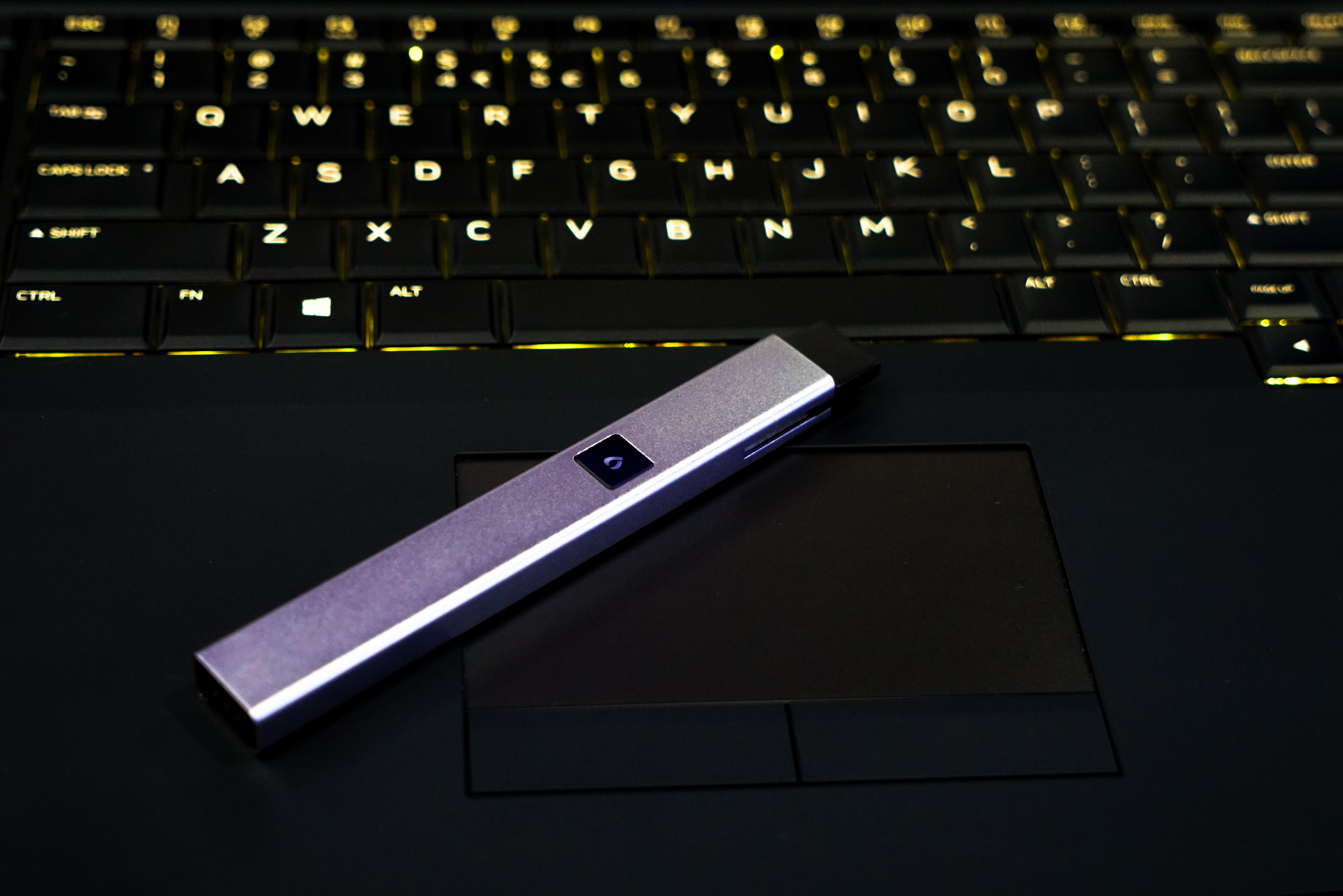
Cannabis vape pen

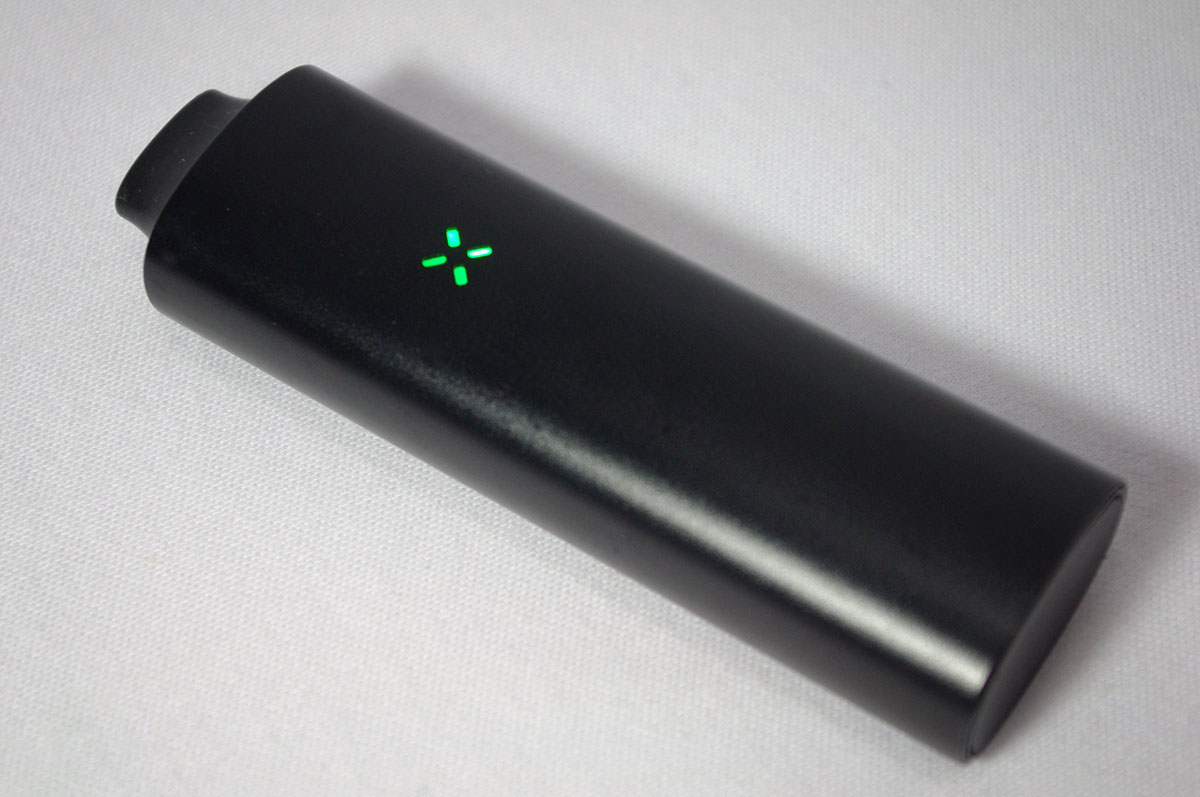
Cannabis vaporizer

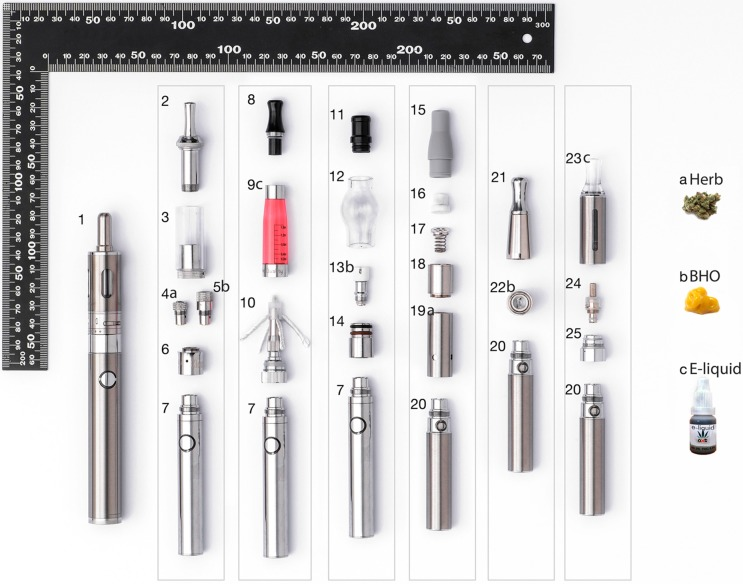
An image of various kinds of cannabis vape pen components and the various forms of cannabis that can be used in them

Of the studies that have investigated cannabis vaporization, few have addressed the quality of the vapor extracted and delivered; instead, studies usually focus on the mode of usage of the vaporizers. However, those that have addressed vapor quality have demonstrated promising results. Such studies suggest that the absence of combustion results in an aerosol that contains significantly lower amounts of harmful substances found in smoke, such as tar, carbon monoxide, and carcinogenic compounds known as polynuclear aromatic hydrocarbons (PAH). One study found that cannabis smoke contains 111 compounds (including several carcinogenic PAHs) in addition to the cannabinoids, whereas only 3 additional compounds were identified in cannabis vapor, other than the cannabinoids. This suggests that the vaporization of cannabis may be a safer alternative to combusted cannabis. On the other hand, a study in the UK (where cannabis is illegal) found that some illicitly distributed cannabis vaporizers contained harmful levels of xylazine, an animal sedative which can lead to overdose.

Vaporizing cannabis exposes the user to lower levels of harmful substances than smoking cannabis. These findings are important for it is estimated that 10–20% of patients with chronic pain, multiple sclerosis, epilepsy, and HIV/AIDS have admitted to smoking cannabis for therapeutic purposes. For patients, a study found that smoking cannabis sativa reduced daily pain by 34%, a statistically significant amount.

In a study published in the Journal of Psychopharmacology in May 2008, it was stated that vaporizers were a "suitable method for the administration of THC". A 2007 study by the University of California, San Francisco, published in the Journal of the American Academy of Neurology, found that "there was virtually no exposure to harmful combustion products using the vaporizing device". A 2006 study performed by researchers at Leiden University found that vaporizers were "safe and effective cannabinoid delivery system(s)". The study stated that the amount of THC delivered by vaporizers were equivalent to the amount delivered by smoking. Because of those studies and other studies, vaporizers are considered medically sound devices for delivering THC.

=== Efficiency ===
The proposed factors affecting output include:

- Temperature
- Specimen density
- Weight, content of water and essential oils
- Consistency of material in the filling chamber
- Storage time of the vapor
- Inhalation method (breathing technique)

Not all those have been scientifically tested. Research using vaporizers found the delivery efficiency highest at around 226 °C (439 °F), falling to about half efficiency at 150 to 180 °C (302 to 356 °F) depending on material. The purest preparations produced the highest efficiencies, about 56% for pure THC versus 29% for plant material (female flower tops) with 12% THCA content. Besides THC, several other cannabinoids as well as a range of other plant components including terpenoids were detected in the plant material. Using pure THC in the vaporizer, no degradation products (delta-8-THC (D8-THC), cannabinol (CBN), or unknown compounds) were detected by HPLC analysis. The longer vapor is stored, the more THC is lost as it condenses on the surface of the vaporizer or the balloon. This loss may be negligible over a few minutes but may exceed 50% after 90 minutes. The Leiden University study found that as much as 30–40% of inhaled THC was not absorbed by the lungs but simply exhaled. However, they did not find large individual differences in the amounts exhaled.

== E-cigarette vaporizers ==
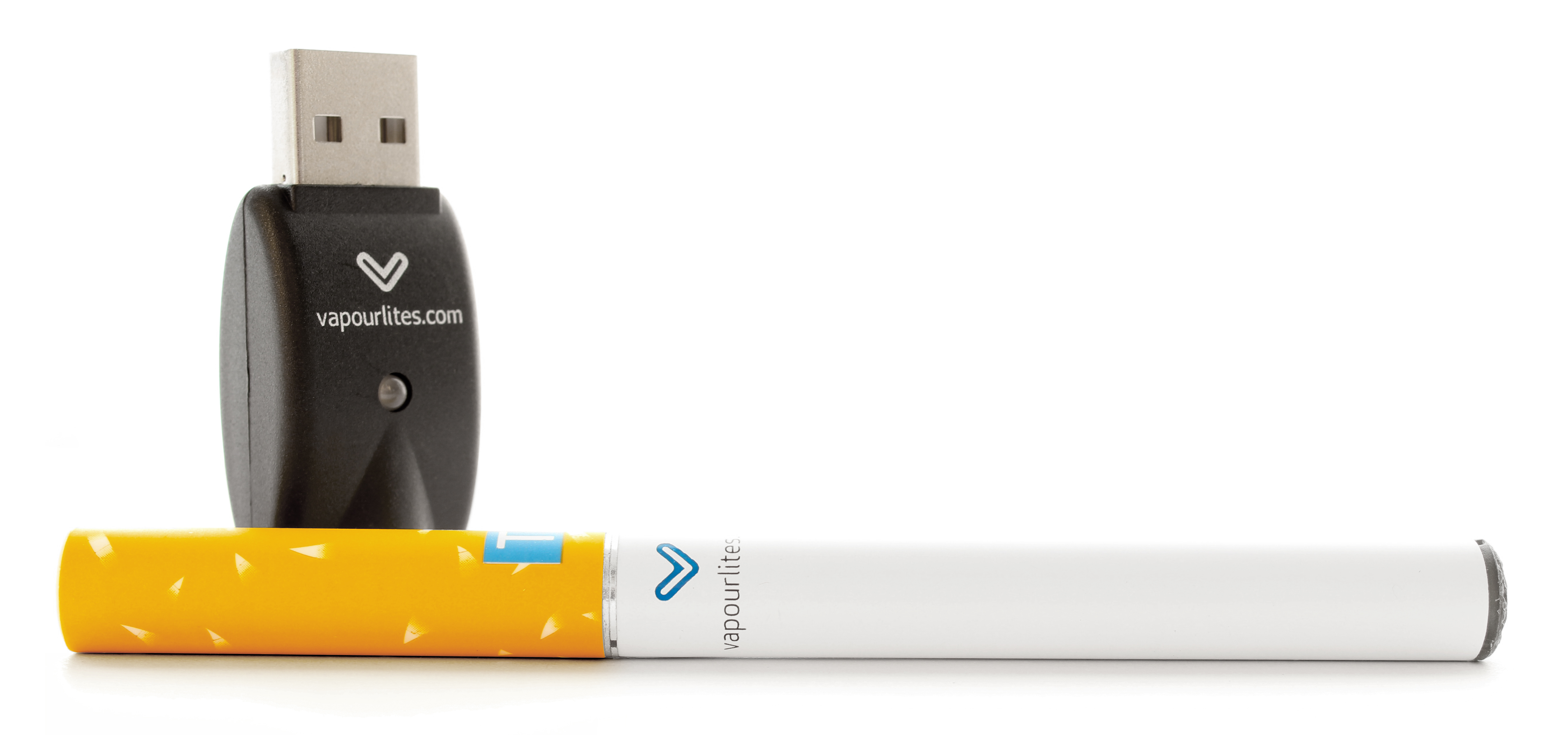
A first-generation e-cigarette that resembles a tobacco cigarette, with a battery portion that can be disconnected and recharged using the USB power charger

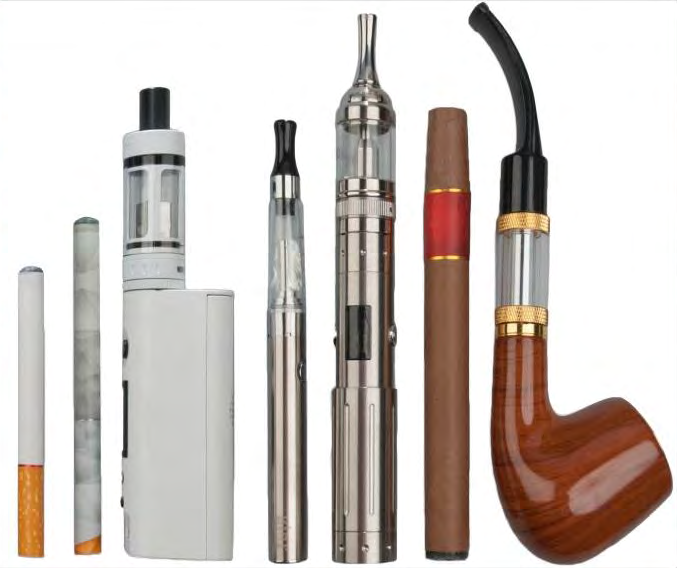
Various types of e-cigarettes from 2015, including a disposable e-cigarette, a rechargeable e-cigarette, a medium-size tank device, large-size tank devices, an e-cigar, and an e-pipe

An electronic cigarette (e-cigarette) or vape (Note: Also known as an e-cig, vaporizer, vape pen, hookah pen, e-pipe, nic stick, razz or, formally, electronic nicotine delivery system (ENDS).) is a device that simulates tobacco smoking. It consists of an atomizer, a power source such as a battery, and a container such as a cartridge or tank. Instead of smoke, the user inhales vapor, often called "vaping".

The atomizer is a heating element that vaporizes a liquid solution called e-liquid that cools into an aerosol of tiny droplets, vapor and air. The vapor mainly comprises propylene glycol or glycerin, usually with nicotine and flavoring. Its exact composition varies, and depends on matters such as user behavior. (Note: A 2014 review found "In addition to the uniqueness of the liquid compositions in each brand, inconsistency of both the device performance properties and the data collection methodologies used by researchers contribute to the observed variation in constituent levels and to the range of particle size distributions among products.") E-cigarettes are activated by taking a puff or pressing a button. Some look like traditional cigarettes, and most kinds are reusable. (Note: "Most ENDS consist of a rechargeable, battery-operated heating element and a replaceable or refillable cartridge for the e-liquid. An atomizer heats the liquid in the cartridge to convert it into an aerosol, which is then inhaled by the user. Most of these products are rechargeable, but some are disposable.")

Vaping is less harmful than smoking, but still has health risks, particularly for those with asthma. Limited evidence indicates that e-cigarettes are less addictive than smoking, with slower nicotine absorption rates.

E-cigarettes containing nicotine are more effective than nicotine replacement therapy (NRT) for smoking cessation, but have not been tested as rigorously as nicotine replacement therapy products.

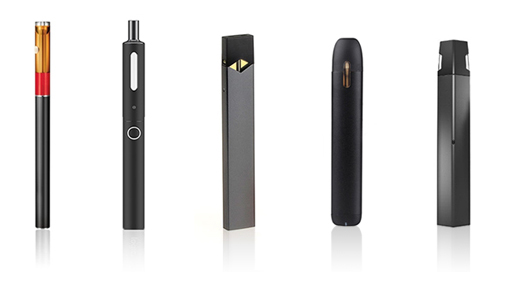
Various types of electronic cigarettes

An electronic cigarette is a handheld battery-powered vaporizer that simulates smoking by providing some of the behavioral aspects of smoking, including the hand-to-mouth action of smoking, but without combusting tobacco. Using an e-cigarette is known as "vaping" and the user is referred to as a "vaper." Instead of cigarette smoke, the user inhales an aerosol, commonly called vapor.

E-cigarettes typically have a heating element that atomizes a liquid solution called e-liquid. E-cigarettes may be automatically activated by taking a puff; others turn on manually by pressing a button. Some e-cigarettes look like traditional cigarettes, but they come in many variations. Most versions are reusable, though some are disposable. There are first-generation, second-generation, third-generation, and fourth-generation devices.

E-liquids usually contain propylene glycol, glycerin, nicotine, flavorings, additives, and differing amounts of contaminants. E-liquids are also sold without propylene glycol, nicotine, or flavors.

Studies have found that heating propylene glycol and glycerin in electronic cigarette devices can generate high concentrations of fine particulate matter (PM₂.₅) and produce formaldehyde and other toxic carbonyl compounds through thermal decomposition.

There is tentative evidence that they may help people quit smoking. There is concern with the possibility that non-smokers and children may start nicotine use with e-cigarettes at a rate higher than anticipated than if they were never created. Following the possibility of nicotine addiction from e-cigarette use, there is concern that children may start smoking cigarettes. Youth who use e-cigarettes are more likely to go on to smoke cigarettes. Their part in tobacco harm reduction is unclear, while another review found they appear to have the potential to lower tobacco-related death and disease. Regulated US Food and Drug Administration nicotine replacement products may be safer than e-cigarettes, but e-cigarettes are generally seen as safer than combusted tobacco products. It is estimated their safety risk to users is similar to that of smokeless tobacco. The long-term effects of e-cigarette use are unknown. The risk from serious adverse events was reported in 2016 to be low. Less serious adverse effects include abdominal pain, headache, blurry vision, throat and mouth irritation, vomiting, nausea, and coughing. Nicotine itself is associated with some health harms. In 2019 and 2020, an outbreak of severe lung illness throughout the US was linked to the use of contaminated black market THC vape cartridges.

== Other drugs ==
Vaporizers can be used to inhale other recreational drugs as well. A wide variety can be consumed this way, either dissolved in e-liquid or vaporized directly. The use of e-cigarettes to inhale the psychedelic drug dimethyltryptamine (DMT) has been reported.

== Culinary application ==
Vaporizers are sometimes used by chefs as a method of applying controlled heat to herbs and spices to release flavors that are otherwise difficult to titrate or apply, or that might be spoiled by overheating during cooking. Grant Achatz, chef-proprietor of Alinea in Chicago, "uses the aroma-filled bags as place-mats, punctured when plates are placed in front of the customer".

== See also ==
- Anesthetic vaporizer
- Aromatherapy
- Chasing the dragon
- Eagle Bill
- Nebulizer

== Bibliography ==
- Wilder, Natalie; Daley, Claire; Sugarman, Jane; Partridge, James (April 2016). "Nicotine without smoke: Tobacco harm reduction". UK: Royal College of Physicians. pp. 1–191.
- "Electronic nicotine delivery systems" (PDF). World Health Organization. 21 July 2014. pp. 1–13.
