= Artemisia (Cimarosa) =

Artemisia is the last opera of Domenico Cimarosa. The libretto, in three acts, is by Count Giovanni Battista Colloredo. Cimarosa died on 11 January 1801 before writing the music to Act III; with the first performance given at the Teatro La Fenice in Venice on 17 January 1801. It also included interpolations by other hands in the first two acts.

In the opera, Artemisia, Queen of Caria, the widow of Mausolus, had to deal with a variety of unwanted suitors.

The opera is not to be confused with Cimarosa's earlier opera (1797), Artemisia, Regina di Caria (Artemisa, Queen of Caria), which has a similar storyline, but is set to a different libretto.
