= Atomizer Geyser =

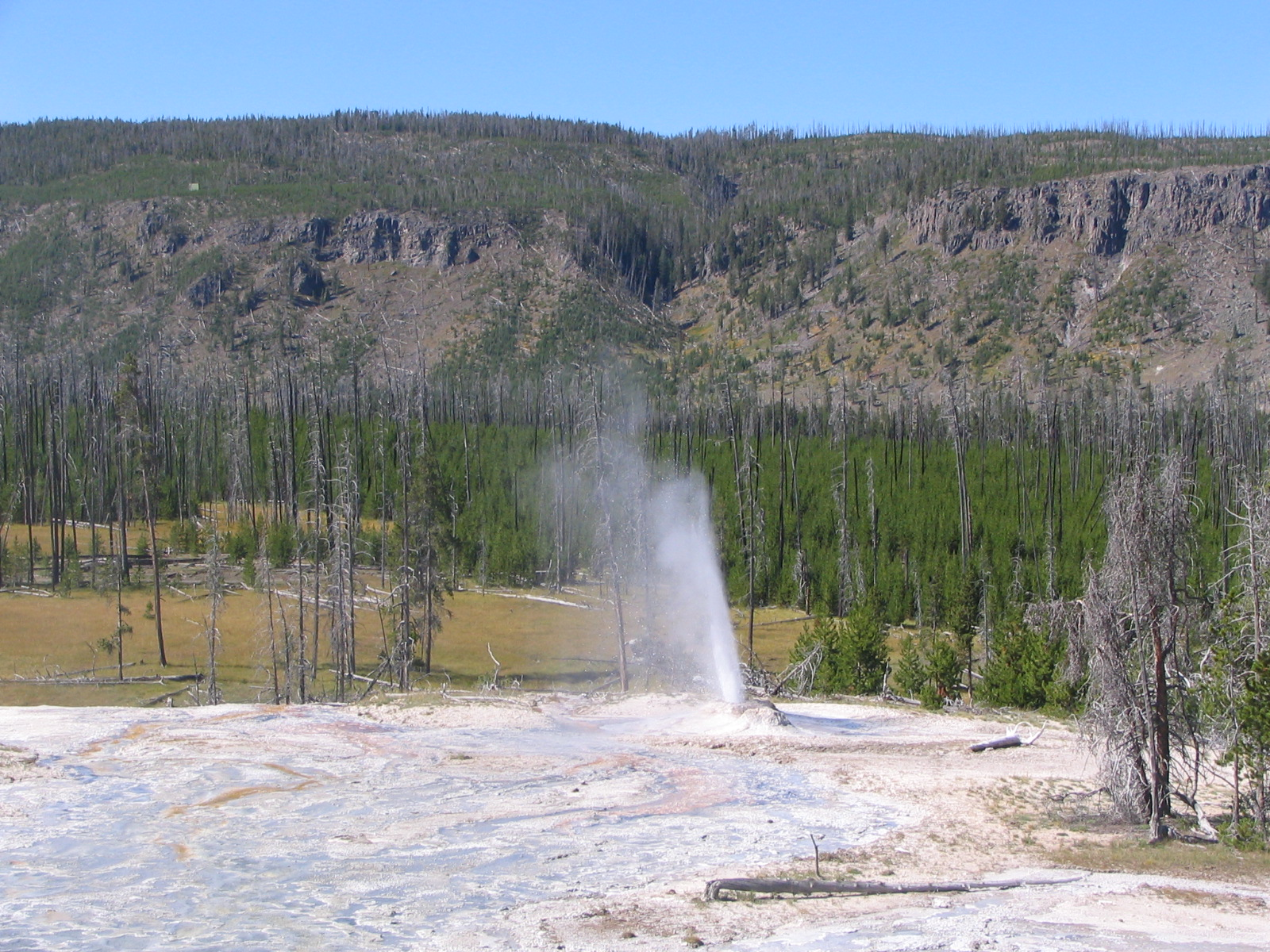

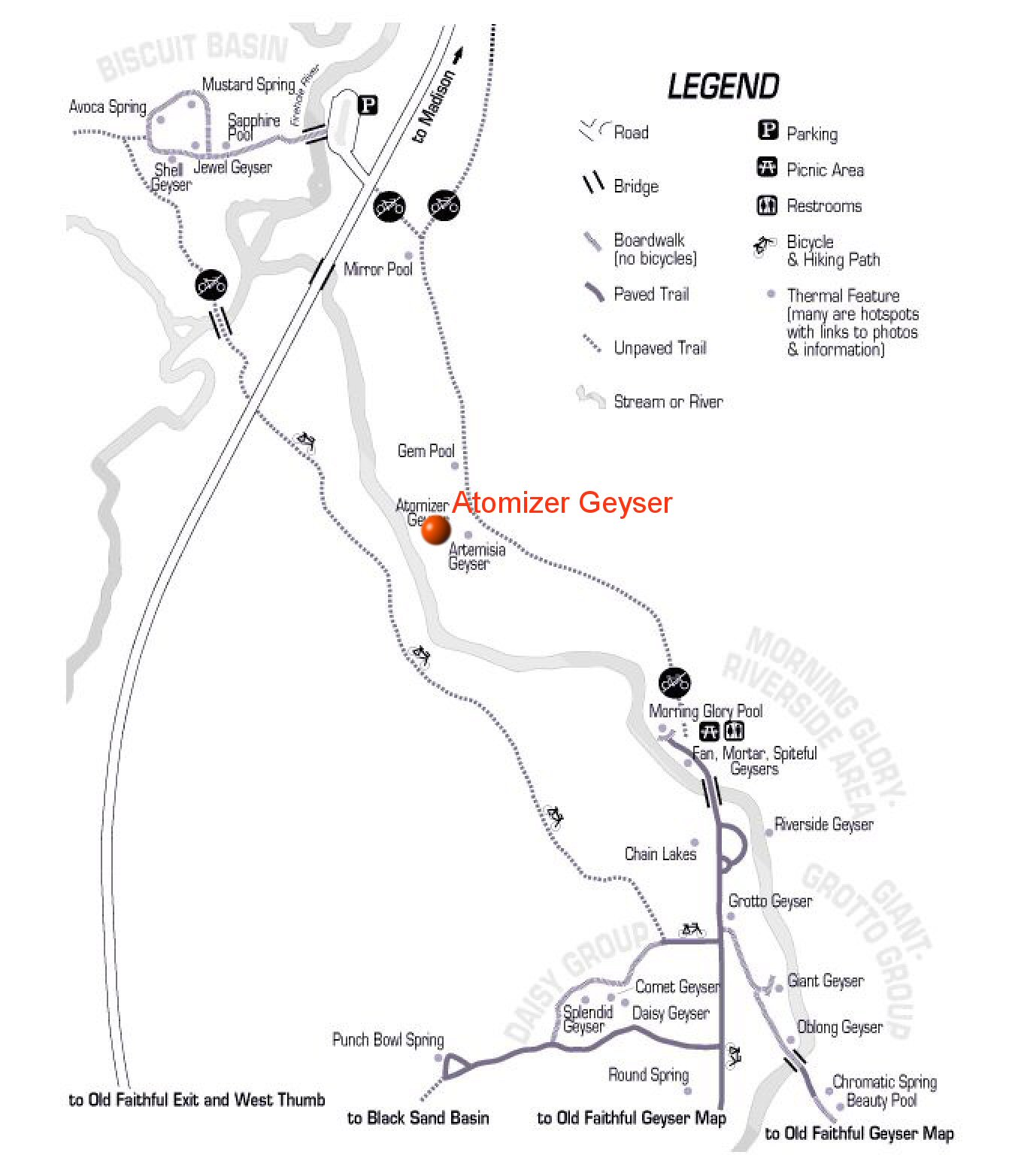
- Map of Upper Geyser Basin
- Location: Upper Geyser Basin, Yellowstone National Park, Teton County, Wyoming
- Coordinates: 44°28′41″N 110°50′57″W
- Type: Cone Geyser
- Eruption height: 30 ft (9.1 m) (minor); 40 to 50 feet (12 to 15 m) (major)
- Duration: 1 minute (minor); 8 to 10 minutes (major)
- Temperature: 194 °F (90 °C)

Atomizer Geyser is a cone geyser in the Upper Geyser Basin (Old Faithful area) of Yellowstone National Park in the United States. Atomizer Geyser is part of the Cascade Group which also includes Artemisia Geyser. The geyser is named for a fine mist resembling the spray from an atomizer that is ejected during major eruptions.

== Geology ==
Atomizer has two 3 foot (1 m) tall cones. One of the cones is the jetting cone from which all water jets come. The other cone sprays a fine mist during major eruptions, giving the geyser its name. The geyser erupts in series. The series consists of three to five minor eruptions and one major eruption. Minor eruptions last about one minute and reach to 30 feet (9.1 m). Major eruptions last 8 to 10 minutes and reach 40 to 50 feet (12 to 15 m). Major eruptions have a steam phase following the water phase.

Atomizer overflows its pool every few minutes for two to four hours until the first minor eruption occurs. Six to eight minor eruptions occur about one hour apart. Between 15 minutes and 1½ hours after the last minor eruption, the major eruption will begin. After a major eruption, the water pool takes about six hours to refill.
