= Artemisia Geyser =

Geyser in Yellowstone National Park, Wyoming, U.S.

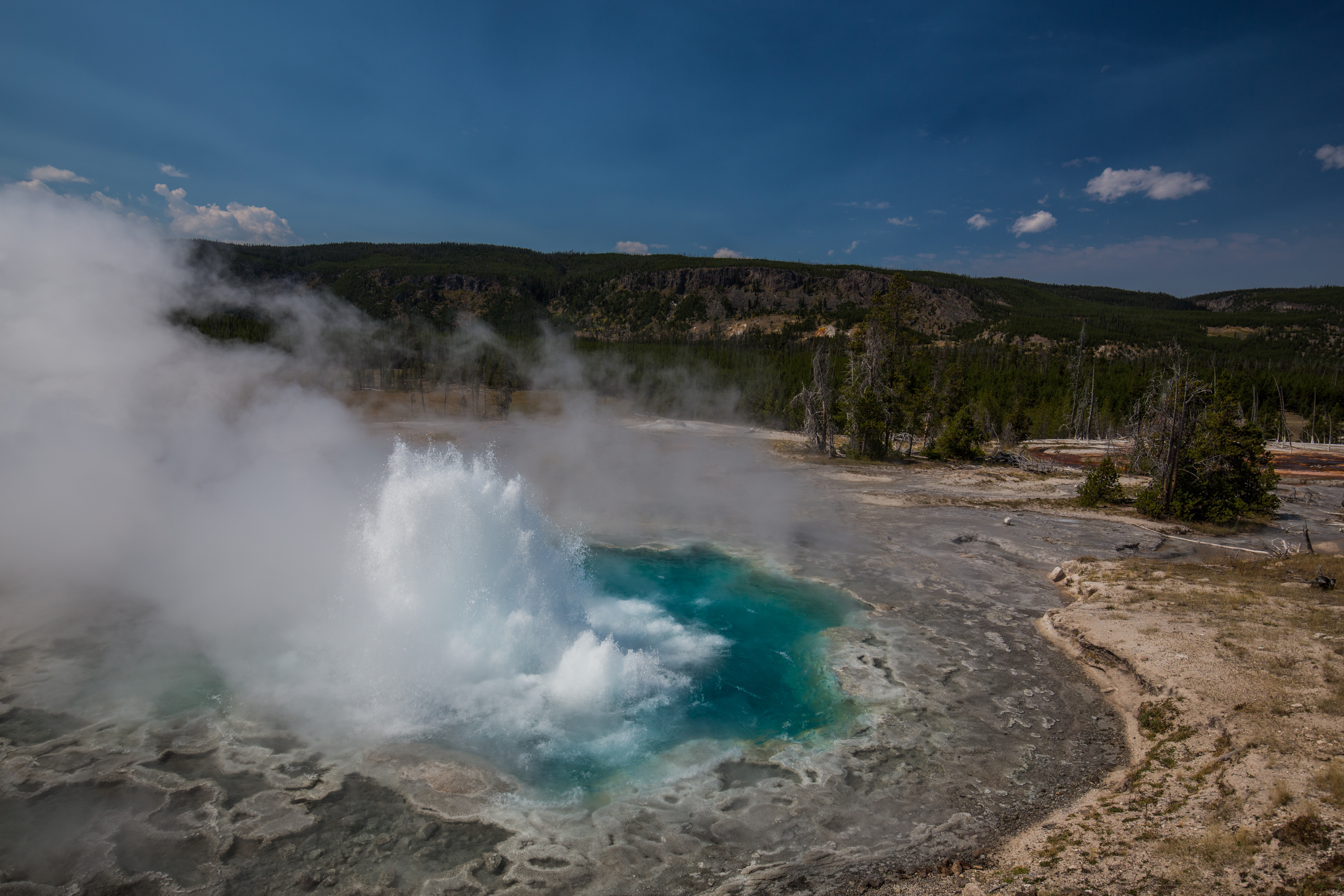
- Artemisia Geyser during eruption

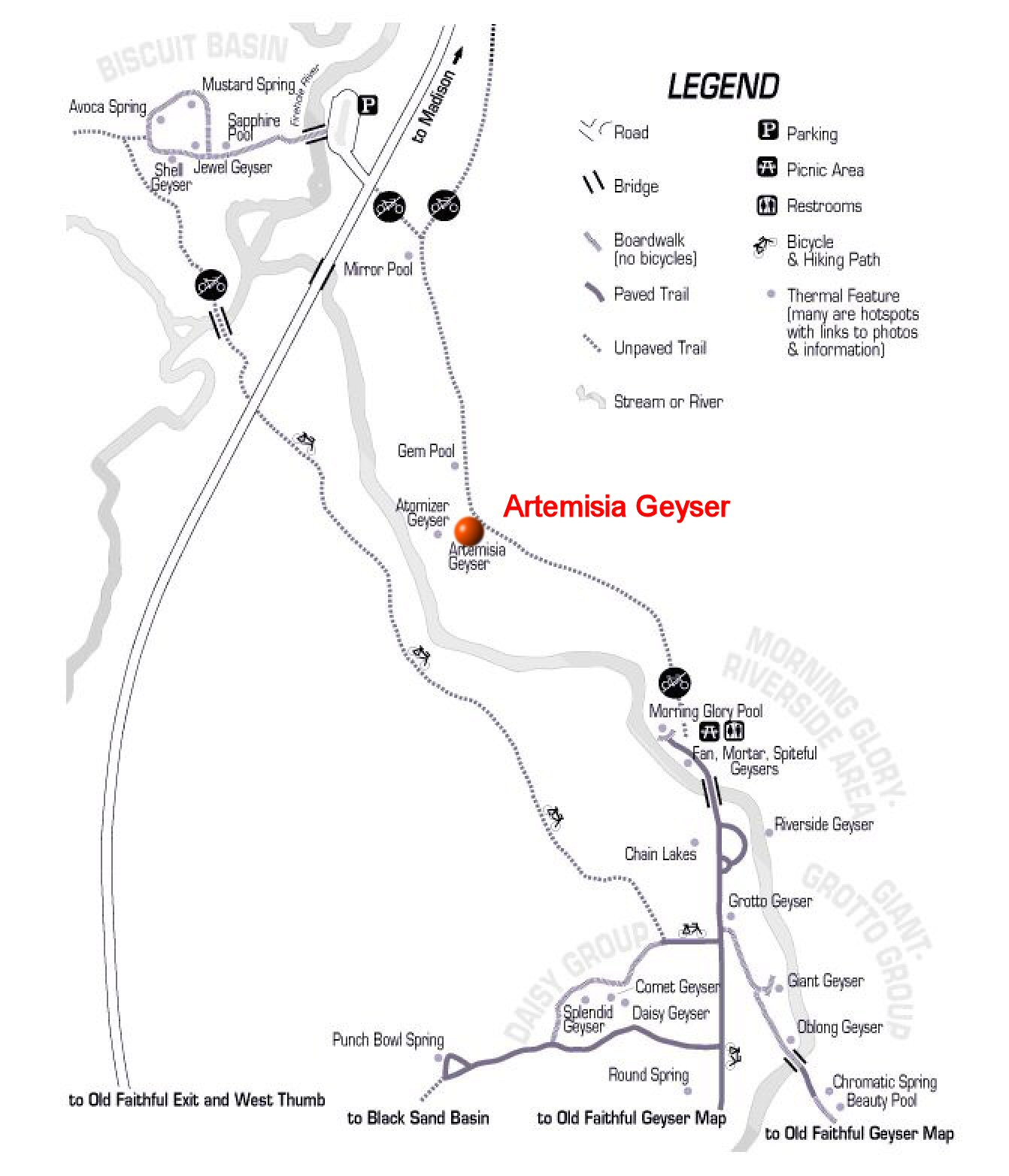
- Map of Upper Geyser Basin
- Location: Upper Geyser Basin, Yellowstone National Park, Teton County, Wyoming
- Coordinates: 44°28′42″N 110°50′55″W
- Type: Fountain Geyser
- Eruption height: Up to 30 ft (9.1 m)
- Frequency: 9 to 36 hours
- Duration: 15 to 25 minutes
- Temperature: 177 °F (81 °C)

Artemisia Geyser is a geyser in the Upper Geyser Basin of Yellowstone National Park in the United States.

== History ==
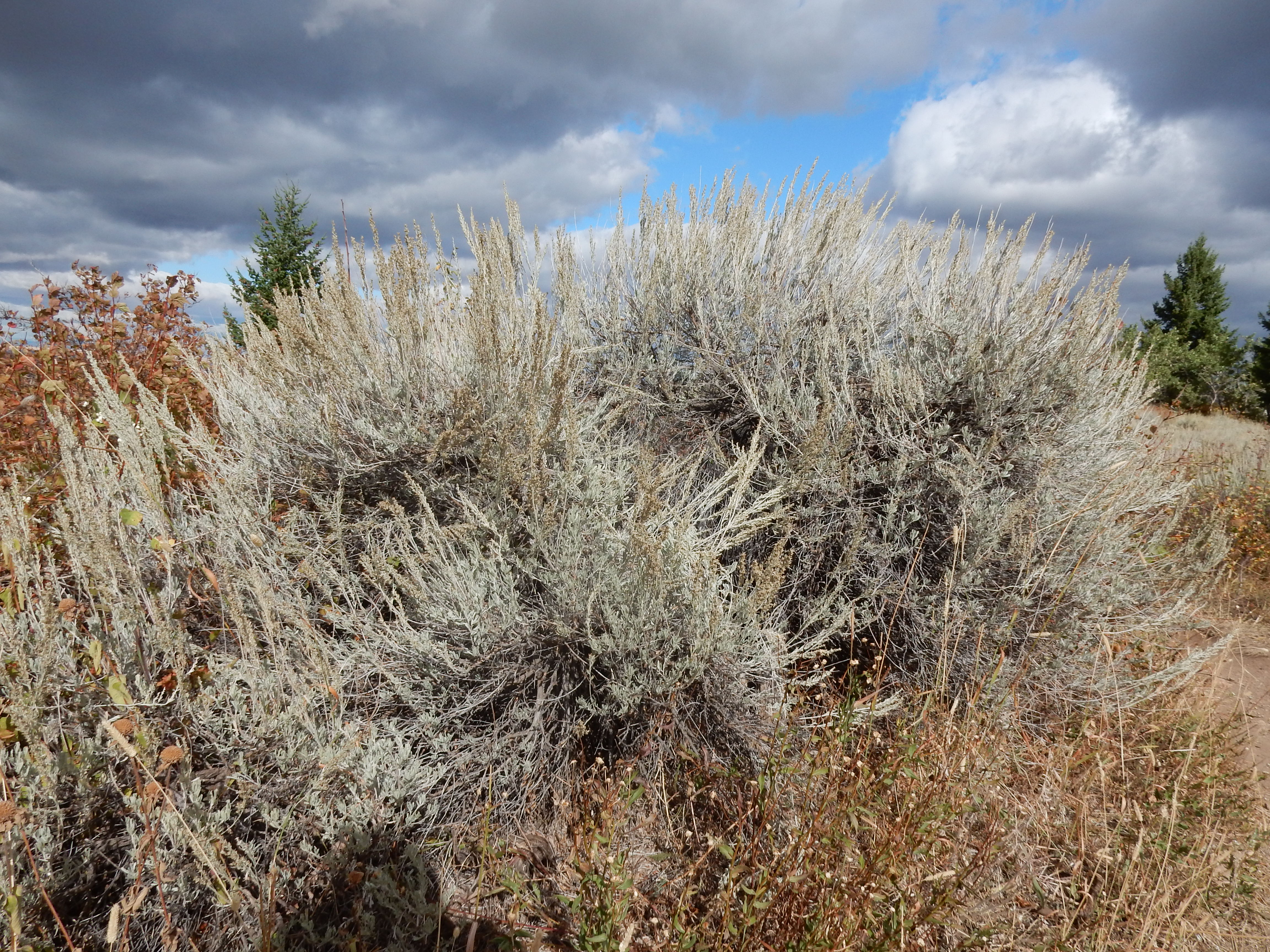
Artemisia tridentata

The geyser was named in 1883 by geologist Walter Weed after Artemisia tridentata (Big Sagebrush), a common plant in the Yellowstone National Park area, due to the color of the sinter deposits on the south and southwest sides of the crater. Artemisia Geyser was not referenced in the findings of the Hayden Geological Survey in 1881 (likely due to inaccessibility and inconspicuousness—around one eruption per day), and only referred to as a spring until 1886.

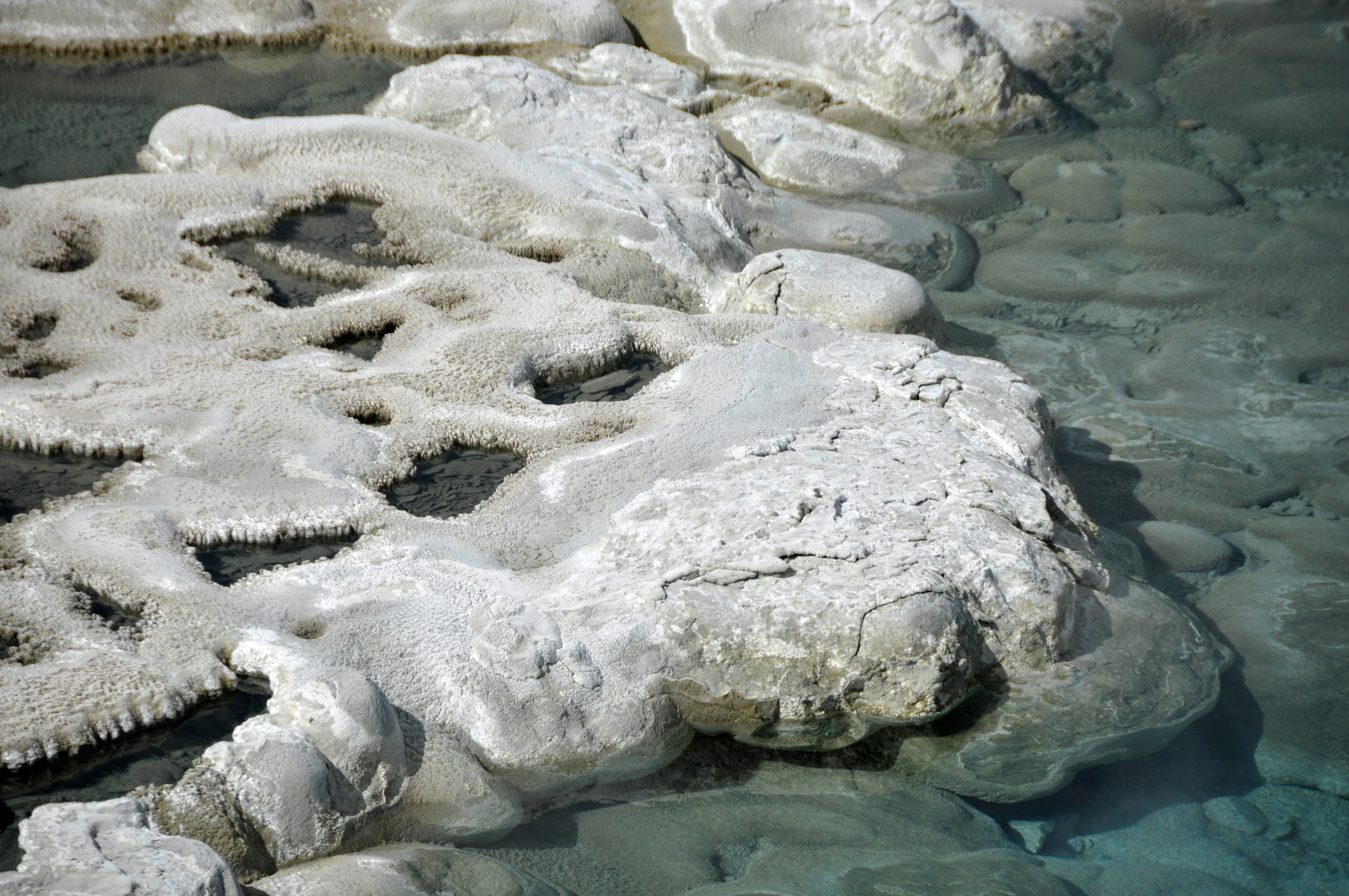
Formations in the Artemisia Geyser

Historian Lee Whittlesey cites geologist Arnold Hague's description of the geyser:

It lies back from the river, not far from the edge of the forest, a large, irregular shaped pool 55 by 60 feet... The pool is turquoise blue in color, highly transparent... The water rises and falls quietly and periodically, being only ruffled by escaping gas bubbles... In an eruption an enormous volume of water is ejected, which slowly builds up, by evaporation, an area of beaded sinter of various structure... The deposits lining the pool are pure white except along the border, or where they are under water much of the time, in which case they present a peculiar olive-green tint characteristic of this particular spring.

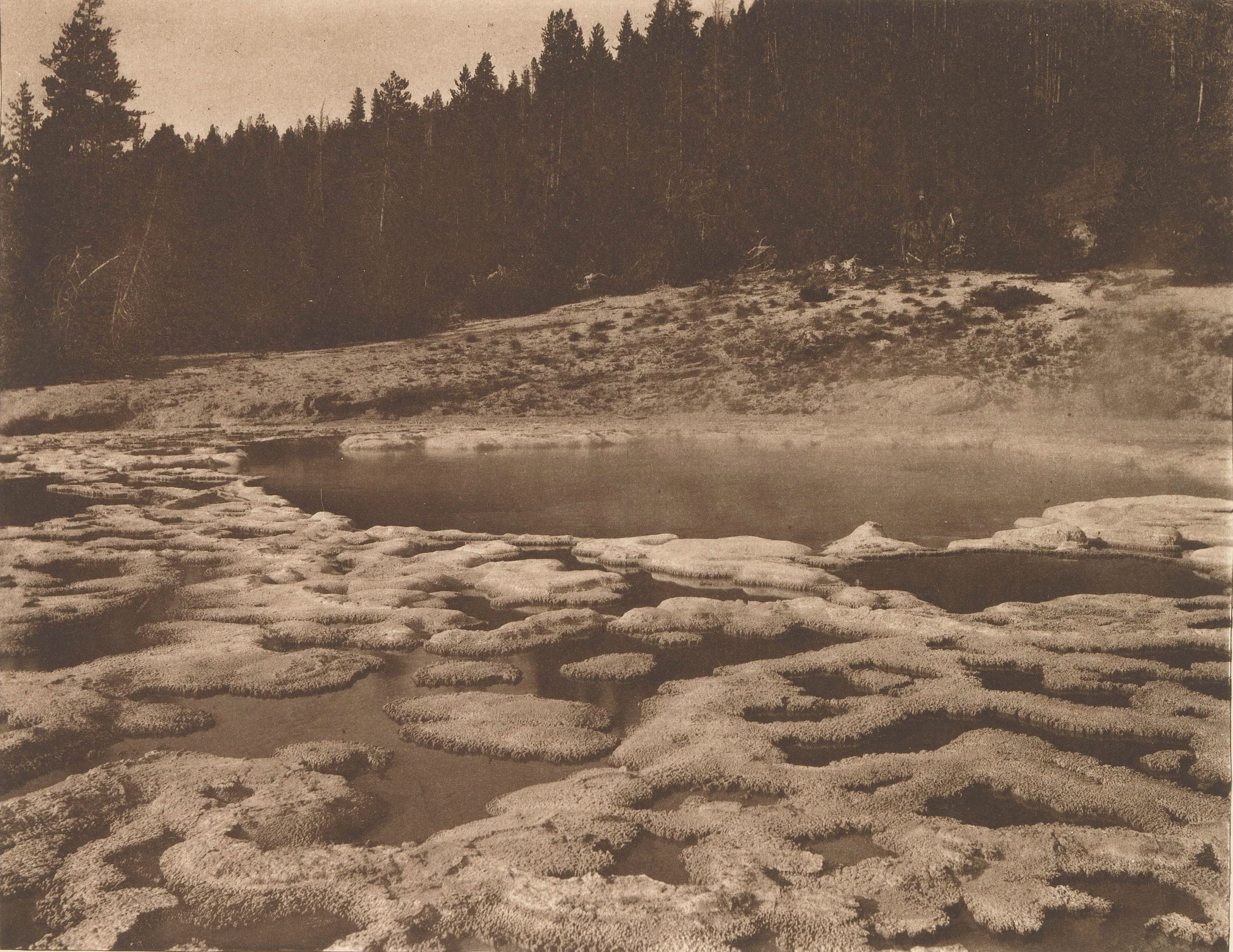
Artemisia Geyser in 1882

== Geology ==
Artemisia Geyser is part of the Cascade Group which also encompasses Atomizer Geyser, Calthos Spring, Gem Pool, "Hillside" Geyser, "Seismic" Geyser, and Sprite Spring.

It erupts with fair regularity, signaling eruption with a sudden dramatic rise in water level and consistent boiling. The fountain reaches heights of 10 to 35 feet depending upon the type of activity—categorized as major (20 to 35 ft) and minor (10 to 15 ft). Minor eruptions have occurred as often as once every 2 to 3 days. These short 5-minute ejections are not common, but were considered rare until 1985. The pool will refill in about 2 hours after a minor eruption with the interval to a full eruption being up to 4.5 hours. Major eruptions cause a heavy deluge of discharged water and a large steam cloud if the weather is cold or humid.

Eruptions are accompanied by a strong underground thumping caused by steam bubbles collapsing in the geyser's channels.

In 2009, intervals between major eruptions ranged from 9 to 36 hours, averaging 18 hours, 43 minutes. Since the 1980s, the range between long, short, and average intervals has gradually increased, varying widely from 19 to 40 hours and averaging near 23 hours in 2018.
